= AEK B.C. =

Greek professional basketball club based in Athens

AEK Athens
- 2026–27 AEK B.C. season
- Nickname: Vasilissa (Queen); Énosis (Union); Kitrinómavri (The Yellow-Blacks); Dikéfalos Aetós (Two-Headed Eagle)
- Leagues: Greek Basketball League; Champions League
- Founded: 1924; 102 years ago
- History: AEK B.C. (1924–present)
- Arena: SUNEL Arena
- Capacity: 9,025
- Location: Athens, Greece
- Team colors: Yellow, Black
- President: Evangelos Angelopoulos
- Team manager: Ilias Kekos
- Head coach: Dragan Šakota
- Team captain: Dimitris Flionis
- Ownership: Makis Angelopoulos (76%); Vertical Solutions (24%)
- Championships: 1 FIBA Intercontinental Cup; 1 FIBA Champions League; 2 FIBA Saporta Cups; 8 Greek Championships; 5 Greek Cups
- Retired numbers: 3 (6, 10, 13)
- Website: aekbc.gr
GBL Home	GBL Away	BCL Home

AEK Basketball Club (Greek: ΚΑΕ ΑΕΚ Greek pronunciation: [ˈaek]; Αθλητική Ένωσις Κωνσταντινουπόλεως Athlitikí Énosis Konstantinoupóleos, "Athletic Union of Constantinople"), and also known as AEK B.C. or simply AEK, and more commonly known in European competitions as AEK Athens, is a Greek professional basketball club based in Athens, Attica, Greece, part of the major multi-sport club AEK. The club was established in Athens in 1924 by Greek refugees from Constantinople in the wake of the Greco-Turkish War (1919–1922). The club's emblem is the double-headed eagle, the symbol of Palaiologos dynasty and the Byzantine Empire, their colours yellow and black, also inspired by the Byzantine Empire, serving to remind future generations of the glorious legacy of the Greeks of Constantinople. Their home arena is the SUNEL Arena, a 9,025-capacity indoor arena in Ano Liosia, Athens.

AEK has been established as one of the most successful basketball teams in Greek and European basketball history, having won 8 Greek Championships, 5 Greek Cups, 2 Saporta Cups (former European Cup Winners' Cup), 1 Champions League and 1 Intercontinental Cup. They are the first ever Greek basketball team to reach a European Cup Final and the first ever to win a European title. On 4 April 1968, AEK defeated Slavia VŠ Praha by a score of 89–82, in Athens in front of 80,000 fans. AEK have also reached the Final of EuroLeague in 1997–98 and have also reached the Final Four of Basketball Champions League in four occasions. AEK holds the all-time European attendance record, with an official crowd of approximately 80,000 (and tens of thousands more outside the stadium).

They have produced great figures of the sport, foremost among them is Giorgos Amerikanos, in whose honor the number 10 jersey has been retired. Furthermore, it was named the best team across all sports at either the club or national level by the Panhellenic Association of Sports Press on three occasions (1965, 1966, and 1968). AEK are considered as one of the top Greek basketball teams and one of the top sports clubs in Greece, as they maintain more than 30 sports departments.

== History ==
=== Early years ===
The large Greek population of Constantinople, not unlike those of the other Ottoman urban centres, continued its athletic traditions in the form of numerous athletic clubs. Clubs such as Enosis Tataoulon (Ένωσις Ταταούλων), from the Tatavla district, Megas Alexandros (Μέγας Αλέξανδρος), Hermes (Ερμής) of Galata, Olympias (Ολυμπιάς) of Therapia, and Kati Kioi (Κατί Κίοϊ) of Chalcedon, existed to promote Hellenic athletic and cultural ideals. These were amongst a dozen Greek-backed clubs that dominated the sporting landscape of the city in the years preceding World War I. After the war, with the influx of mainly French and English soldiers to Constantinople, many of the city clubs participated in regular competitions, with teams formed by foreign troops. Taxim, Pera, and Tatavla became the scene of weekly competitions in not only football, but of athletics, cycling, boxing, and tennis.

Of the clubs in the city though, football was dominated by Enosis Tataoulon and Hermes. Hermes, one of the more popular clubs, was formed in 1875, by the Greek community of Pera (Galata). Forced by the Kemalist regime to change its name to Pera Club in 1923, many of its athletes fled to Greece, and settled in Athens and Thessaloniki. The basketball team of AEK is actually the most successful among AEK's athletic departments. The obvious reason is the successes in general of Greek basketball, and that AEK's basketball team was the first ever Greek team to win an international trophy, in any team sport. Under Kostas Karamanlis' guidance, AEK won the club's first Greek League championship in 1958.

=== 1924–1957 ===
Kostas Dimopoulos, one of the creators of the AEK athletic club and footballer of the early years, had the idea of also creating a basketball team. His efforts quickly were matched by others who loved the sport of basketball. He then took over the leadership of the club's basketball department, and together with the Simeonidi brothers, Eumenes Athanasiadis and others, created the club's first basketball team. In the beginning, they took part in friendly games, where they made a good impression. After that, AEK won the first regional basketball championship that was played in Athens, which was organized by the local YMCA, in 1924.

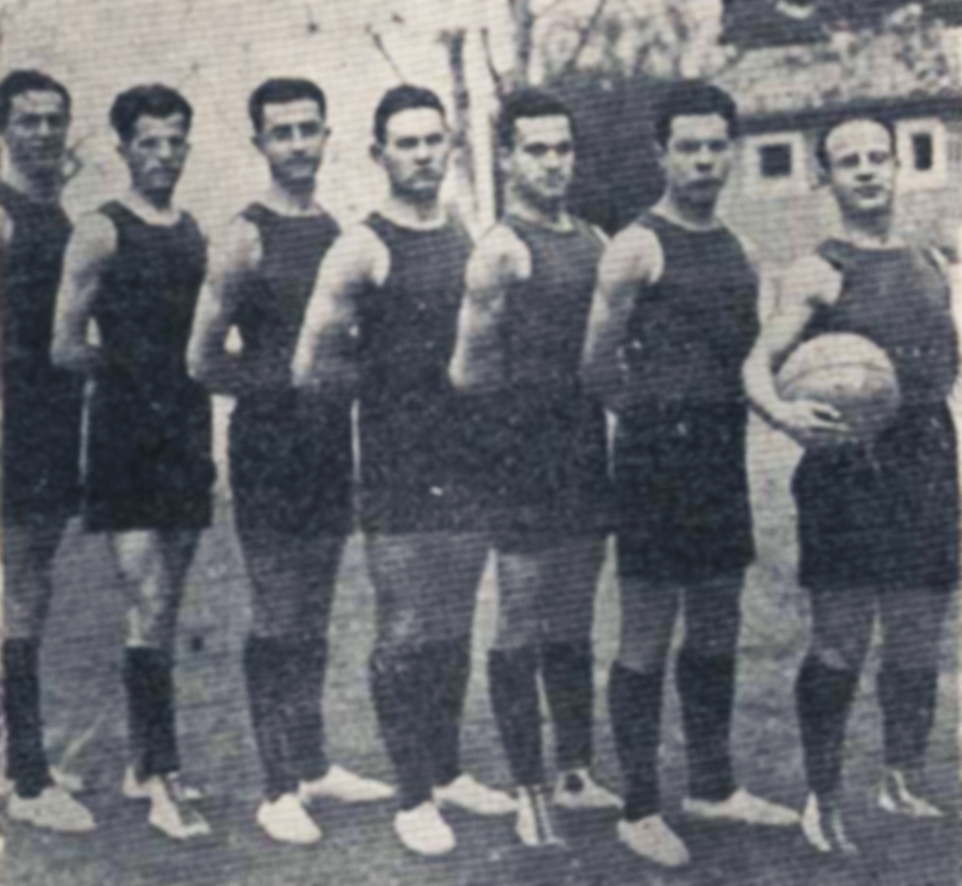
The basketball team in 1928

In 1928, AEK took part in the first Greek basketball championship, in the Athens-Piraeus 1927–28 regional championship. In 1929, the Greek basketball championship was not held, and AEK did not play in any league. In 1930, the basketball section was not declared in any organized competition, with the effective efforts of Kostas Dimopoulos and his associates to do so, failing. The club's basketball section then remained in obscurity for many years. However, in 1949, it reappeared, and the club's administration of that time created a new and competitive team. In the 1952–53 season, AEK played in the Greek basketball championship for the first time since 1928. In the 1954–55 Greek League championship AEK had an impressive run, however, they finished behind Panellinios.

=== 1957–1959 ===
In 1958, AEK B.C., led by the player-coach Kostas Karamanlis, won their first Greek League championship, after defeating Panellinios in the final, by a score of 67–54.

The club also founded a women's section at this time, which lasted for a short time. The department had success with the four sisters Chorianopoulou sisters. However, the club did not give the necessary importance to the department, and it was later dissolved.

=== Amerikanos' era (1960–1970): 6 Championships and a European title ===
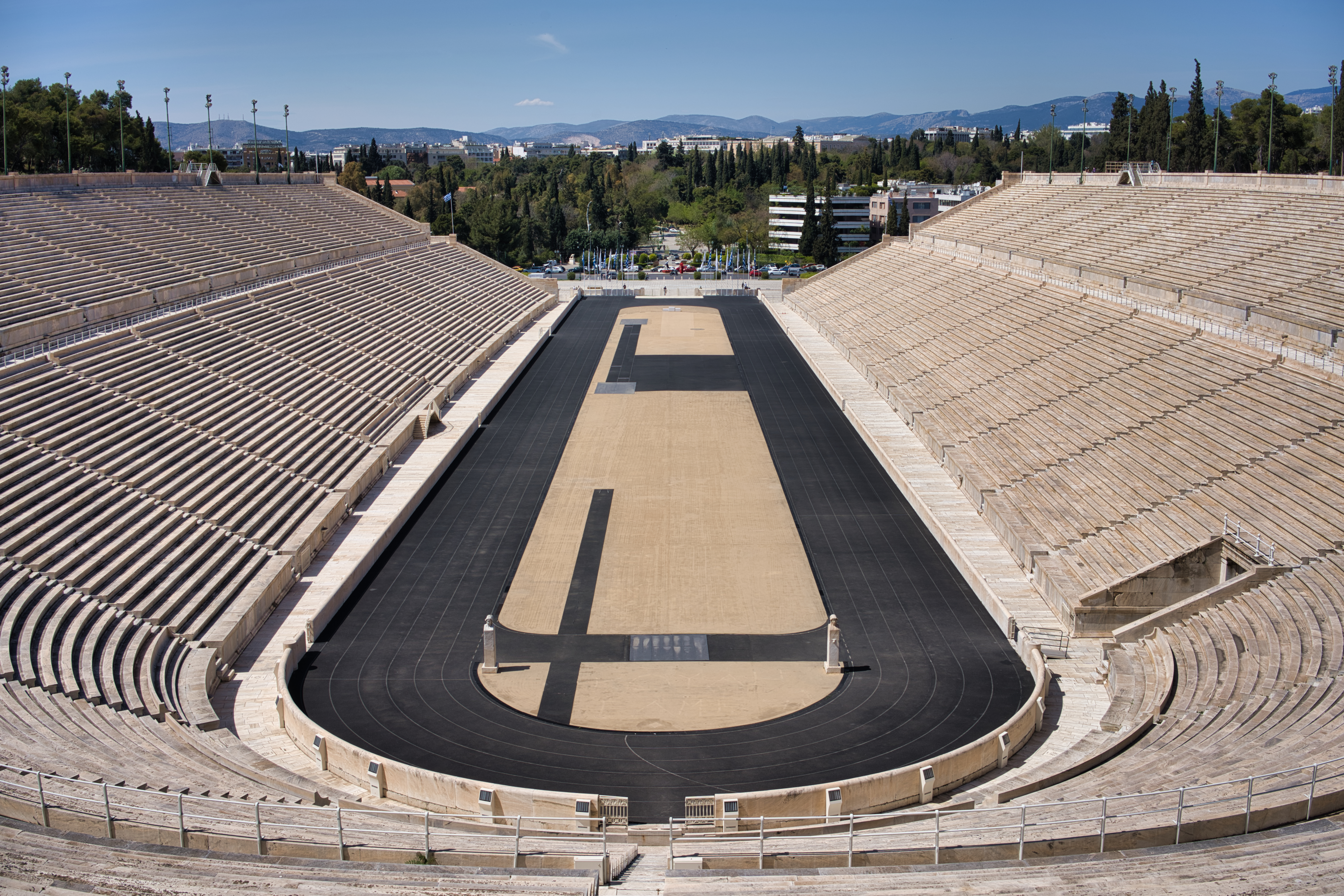
Kallimarmaron Stadium

"The Union", in the early 1960s, won the Athens-Piraeus Regional Championship two times in a row (1960, 1961), but did not manage to become the national league champion of Greece. But the 1960s decade was to be the most important in the history of AEK's basketball club. The team's head coach of the time, Missas Pantazopoulos, created a great roster and led the team to the top of Greece. The club's leading figure during these years was Georgios Amerikanos, who was nicknamed "Global".

In the 1962–63 season, AEK won the first of four consecutive Greek League championships. In the next season, AEK's leading scorer was Antonis Christeas (4th overall in the league), and the club was once again the Greek League champion. In the 1964–65 season, Georgios Amerikanos was the top scorer of the league, and AEK were once again the Greek League champions.

In the following 1965–66 season, AEK won its 4th consecutive Greek League championship, and also became the first Greek basketball team to play in the semi-finals of the FIBA Europe Champions Cup (now called the EuroLeague), as they played at the 1966 Final Four, which was held in Italy. These successes were accompanied by an unfortunate large loss for the team. As one of the team's players, Giorgos Moschos had contracted cancer, but he managed to participate in certain competitions that year, before he died on 29 December 1966, at age 29.

The next season, AEK lost the Greek League championship to Panathinaikos. However, a year later, under head coach Nikos Milas, AEK returned to the top of Greece, as they won the 1967–68 Greek League season championship, without losing a game. Georgios Amerikanos was again the Greek League's Top Scorer.

==== 1968 European Cup Winners' Cup: first European title for a Greek club ====
AEK was the first ever Greek basketball team to participate in the FIBA European Champions Cup (now called the EuroLeague) Final Four, in 1966, which was held in Bologna, Italy. Two years later, AEK was the first-ever Greek team, not only to reach a FIBA European Cup Winners' Cup Final, but also to win a European-wide title. On April 4, 1968, AEK defeated Slavia VŠ Praha, by a score of 89–82, in Athens, in front of 80,000 spectators (at the time, the Guinness world record in basketball attendance) in Kallimarmaron Stadium. In 1970, AEK reached the FIBA European Cup Winners' Cup semi-finals, where the team was eliminated by JA Vichy, France, in what turned out to be the last year of the first "Golden Era" of the club's history. It was called the "Golden Era" because AEK dominated Greek basketball during the 1960s, winning the Greek League championship 4 consecutive years, in 1963, 1964, 1965, and 1966, as well as in 1968 and 1970; for a total of 6 titles in 8 years.

Although there are no official records with regards to the Greek Cup before 1975, according to some sources, AEK won the Greek Cup in the years of 1967 and 1971.

=== 1970–1990 ===
Over the next decades, AEK lost its prestige and managed to win only one trophy, the Greek Cup in 1981, under the direction of Coach Fred Develey, an American coach who previously was the head coach of Maccabi Tel Aviv and Aris of Greece, with superstar Nick Galis. In addition to winning the Greek Cup in 1981, AEK was also a finalist in the Greek Cup in 1976, 1978, 1980, 1988, and 1992, but failed to win in any of those years.

=== The Queen's comeback ===
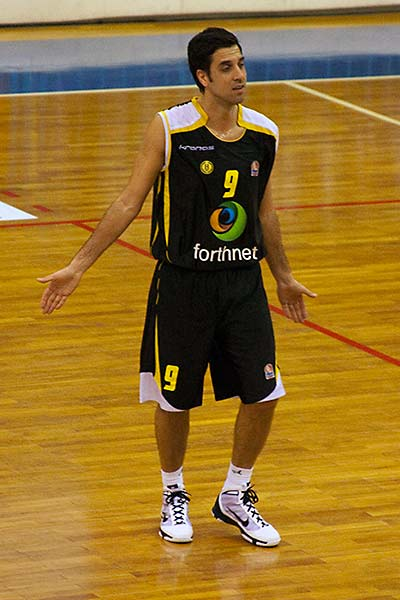
Nikos Chatzis

AEK made a comeback in the late 1990s, when the team played in six consecutive Greek Cup Final Fours in the years 1996, 1997, 1998, 1999, 2000, 2001, four consecutive Greek Cup Finals in the years 1998, 1999, 2000, 2001, winning the Greek Cup in 2000 and 2001. In 2002, AEK won the Greek League championship for the first time in 32 years, becoming the first team to win the Greek League championship after having lost the first two games of a 5-game playoff series. AEK lost the first two games of the series to Olympiacos, but managed to win the next 3 games, and take the series and the title 3–2. AEK also reached the Greek Playoff Finals in the years 1997, 2003, and 2005, and the Greek Cup Semi-finals in the year 2006.

=== 1998 EuroLeague Runners-up and 2000 Saporta Cup Winners ===
AEK experienced a golden era in European basketball during the late 1990s and early 2000s, reaching remarkable heights in international competitions. The pinnacle came in 1998, when AEK reached the EuroLeague Final Four in Barcelona. The team, coached by Giannis Ioannidis, put up a strong fight, defeating Benetton Treviso 69–66 in the semifinals before falling to Kinder Bologna 58–44 in the final. This marked their first-ever appearance in a EuroLeague final, establishing AEK as one of the elite European basketball clubs of the time.

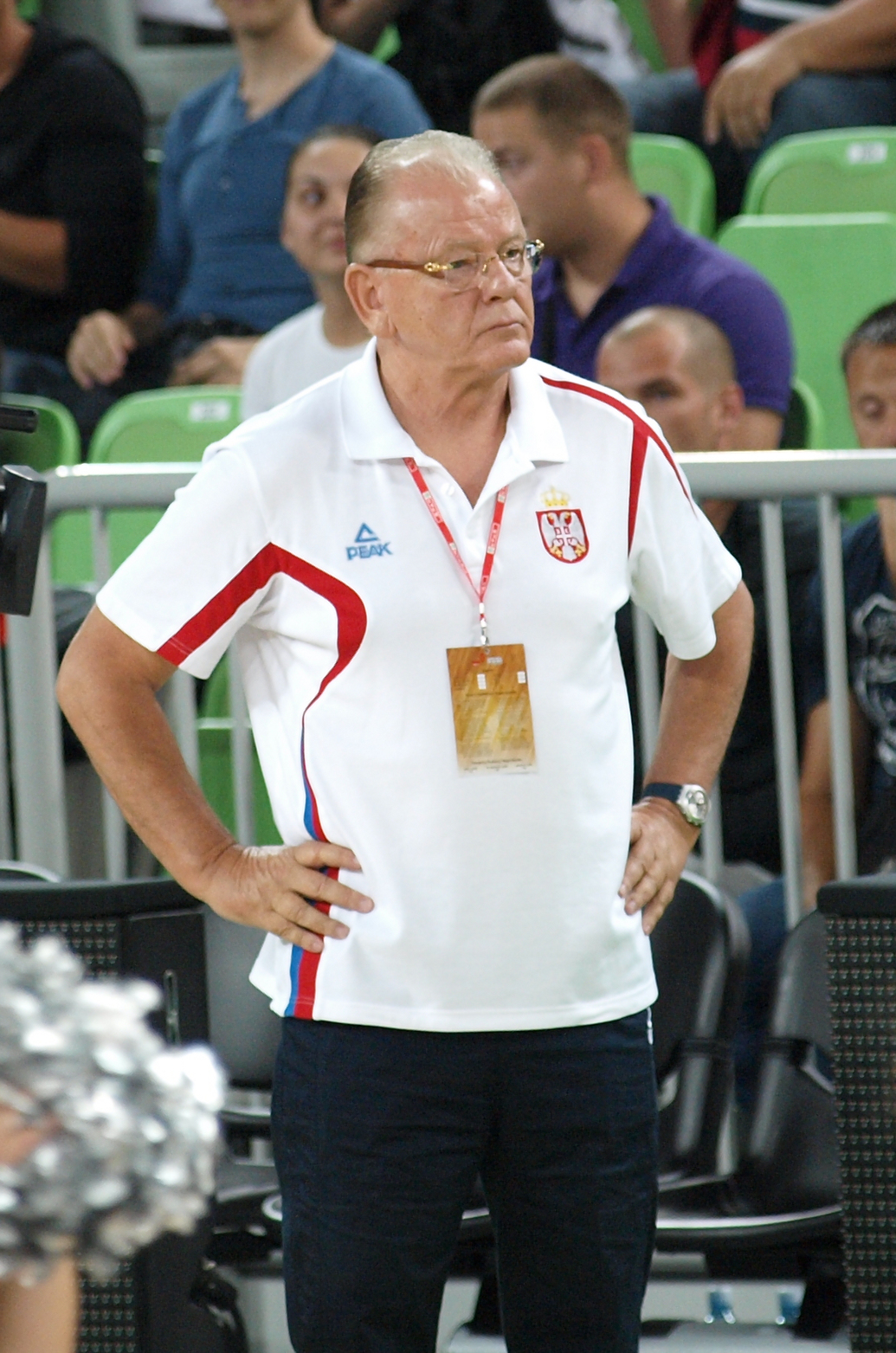
Dušan Ivković

In 2000, AEK achieved another historic feat by winning the FIBA Saporta Cup, with a victory over Kinder Bologna 83–76 in the final. Under coach Dušan Ivković, this win served as a form of revenge for their loss to Bologna in the EuroLeague final two years earlier. The triumph secured AEK's second major European trophy.

The following year, 2001, AEK continued their strong European performances, reaching the EuroLeague semi-finals. However, they were eliminated in the playoffs by Tau Cerámica, who swept the series 3–0. In the 2002 EuroLeague season, AEK once again reached the Top 16 phase, solidifying their reputation in Europe. This was the last notable run for AEK in the EuroLeague during this era, as the team struggled in the following years, with the 2003 and 2004 seasons being considered disappointments. Injuries and inconsistent performances marred their campaigns, and the club failed to qualify for the playoffs in both years.

Despite these setbacks, AEK enjoyed a resurgence in 2005, once again reaching the Top 16. However, a few key losses prevented them from advancing to the EuroLeague playoffs, marking the end of their dominant run in the European competition.

=== Relegation ===
After the 2005–06 season, the owner of the club and major shareholder cut off the club's funding, and various management schemes each year assumed the financial obligations of the club. As a result, the roster gradually weakened year after year, the group declined each year to lower-level league positions and had even less success in European competitions, and the club's debts that were accrued were impossible to pay. In April 2011, AEK was relegated down to the Greek Second Division (A2) due to serious financial problems and there was a great danger for its participation in the next championships.

=== The Queen is back again ===
A new administration council, with Nikos Georgantzoglou as a president, defined by the Athens Court on 12 September 2011 so that the club could be saved and play in the A2 division. AEK had a record of 20 wins and 10 losses during the 2011–12 Greek Second Division. In the summer of 2012, AEK's board of directors announced its participation in the Greek 3rd national category Greek B League ("B Ethniki") "Southern Group", for the 2012–13 season, as an amateur club. The team had a record of 22 wins and 3 losses and was promoted to the A2 category. In the 2013–14 season, AEK once again played in the Greek Second Division. Finally, AEK was the winner of the second division championship and won the league promotion to be able to play in the top Greek League again, after a 3-year period of absence. AEK had a record of 23 wins and 3 losses during the Greek A2 Basket League 2013–14 season.

==== Participation in Greek League ====
In September 2014, AEK overcame heavy financial problems, after Makis Angelopoulos bought the majority stake of the club's shares, just to return to the Greek elite level, and thus wanted to showcase its tradition and ambition in Greece and Europe. In the 2014–15 season, AEK finished in fifth place in the top-tier level Greek League, with 15 wins and 11 losses.

==== Return to European cup competitions ====
In the 2015–16 season, AEK returned to the European-wide 2nd-tier level EuroCup, for the first time since the 2006–07 season. AEK returned to the EuroCup, after having come off a return-to-form season, in which it finished fifth overall in the first-tier level Greek League, to reach the Greek League playoffs, after a seven-year absence. AEK then joined the newly formed FIBA Champions League, for the 2016–17 season. The team reached the 2016–17 FIBA Champions League Round 16.

==== 2018 Greek Cup winners ====
On 17 February 2018, AEK won the 2018 Greek Cup Final against Olympiacos, by a score of 88–83, at Heraklion Indoor Sports Arena, on the island of Crete. It was AEK's first top-tier title won since they won the 2001–02 Greek Basket League season's championship.

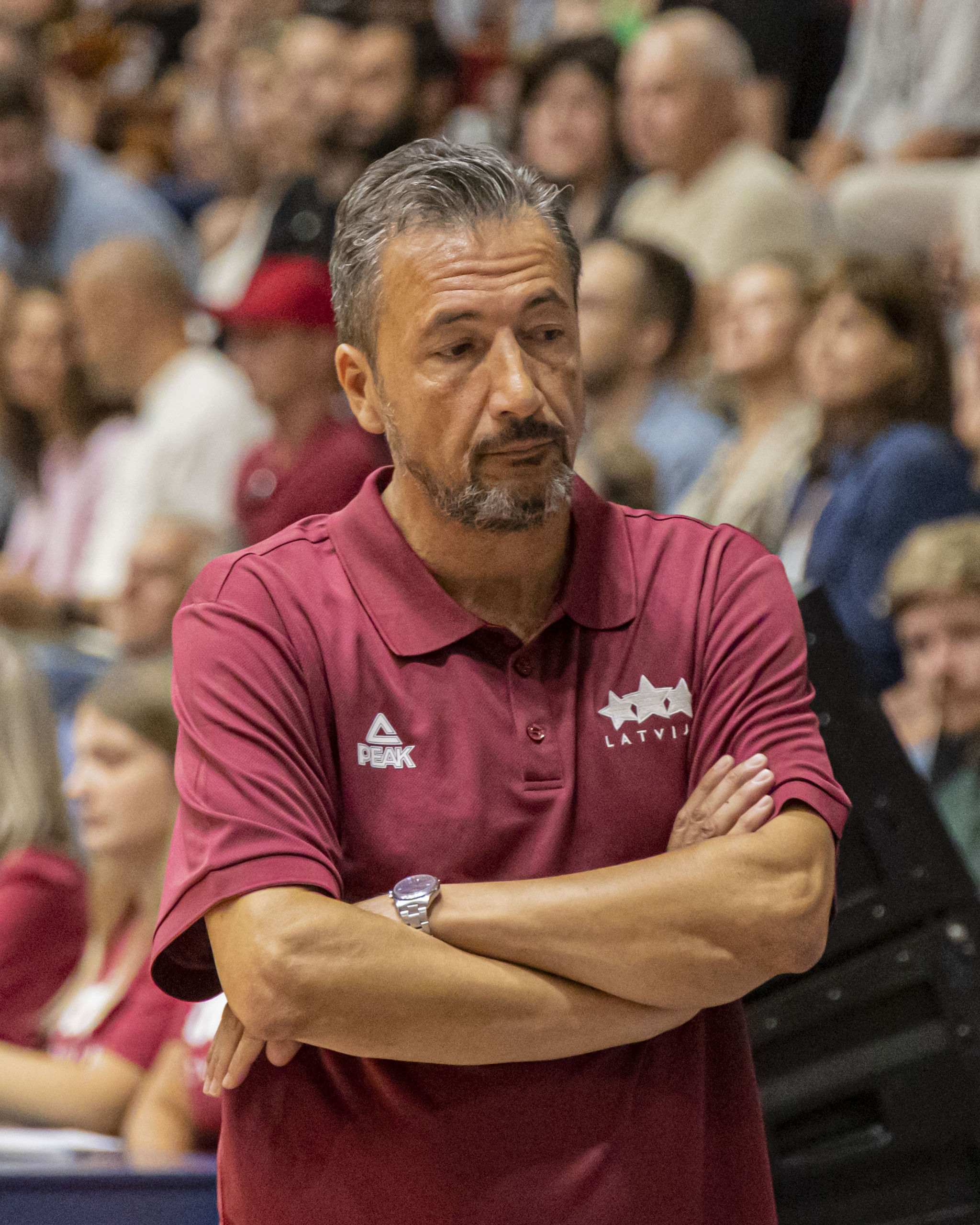
Luca Banchi

==== 2018 FIBA Champions League and 2019 FIBA Intercontinental cup winners ====
On 6 May 2018, AEK won the 2018 FIBA Champions League final against the French club AS Monaco by a score of 100–94 in the Nikos Galis Olympic Indoor Hall of Athens. By winning the FIBA Champions League trophy, AEK earned the right to add a third star to its club crest. The team also qualified to participate in the next edition of the FIBA Intercontinental Cup tournament. In the following FIBA Champions League competition AEK was knocked out of the competition in the quarter-finals by the German side Brose Bamberg. Nevertheless, a bit earlier in the 2018–19 season, AEK became the global basketball champions, for the first time in their perennial history, by winning the 2019 FIBA Intercontinental Cup final against the Brazilian club Flamengo by a score of 86–70 in the Carioca Arena 1 of Rio de Janeiro. That marked the third FIBA Intercontinental Cup championship that was won by a Greek club, after Panathinaikos had won the 1996 FIBA Intercontinental Cup, and Olympiacos had won the 2013 FIBA Intercontinental Cup.

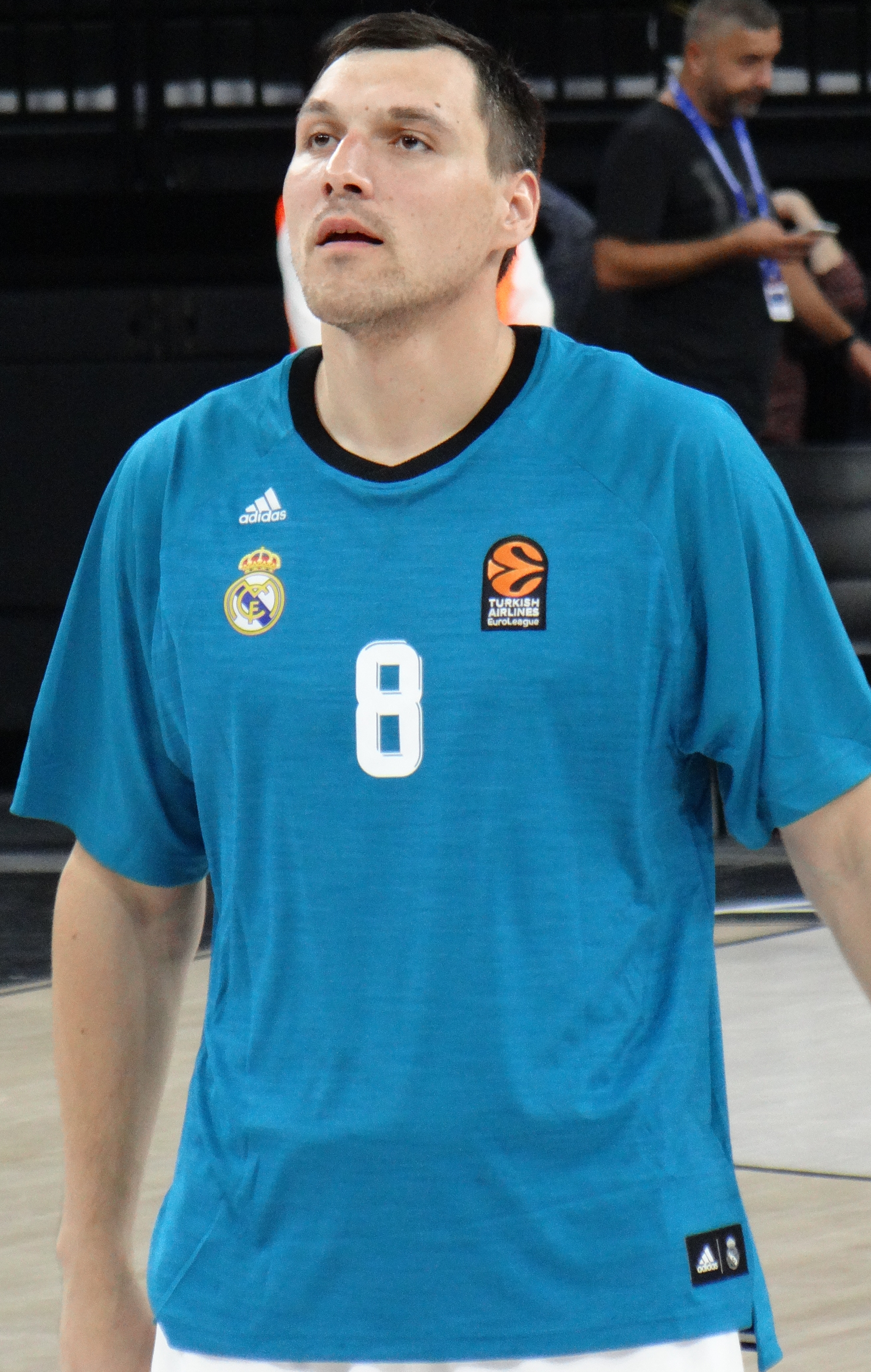
Jonas Mačiulis

==== 2020 Greek Cup winners and 2020 FIBA Champions League runners-up ====
On 16 February 2020, AEK won the 2020 Greek Cup final against Promitheas Patras, by a score of 61–57, at Heraklion Indoor Sports Arena, on the island of Crete. It was AEK's second national top-tier title in two years. On 4 October 2020, AEK lost by 85–74 from the Spanish side San Pablo Burgos in the 2019–20 FIBA Champions League final that was held in the Nikos Galis Olympic Indoor Hall of Athens. This was the second FIBA Champions League final in three years for AEK Athens. The team also holds the FIBA Champions League highest attendance record, as 17,984 fans attended the 2017–18 FIBA Champions League final in the Nikos Galis Olympic Indoor Hall. The 2020s opened a new chapter for AEK B.C., with the club remaining a strong force in Greece and Europe. In 2020–21, AEK reached the Greek Cup final and the Basketball Champions League semifinals, solidifying its place among the country's top teams.

=== The move to Ano Liossia ===
After nearly 100 years of history and playing in more than ten different arenas, AEK B.C. finally found a permanent home with the move to the Ano Liossia Olympic Sports Hall in 2021. Originally built for the 2004 Athens Olympic Games, the venue was one of many Olympic facilities that had been left underused . AEK undertook significant efforts to renovate and revitalize the arena, eventually securing an official operating license in September 2021 — a major milestone that allowed the club to officially base its basketball operations there. Later, the venue also became the first of the 2004 Olympic facilities to secure a commercial sponsorship deal, officially being named "SUNEL Arena" after a partnership agreement was reached. This marked a historic step, both for the arena and for the broader effort to breathe new life into Greece's dormant Olympic legacy.

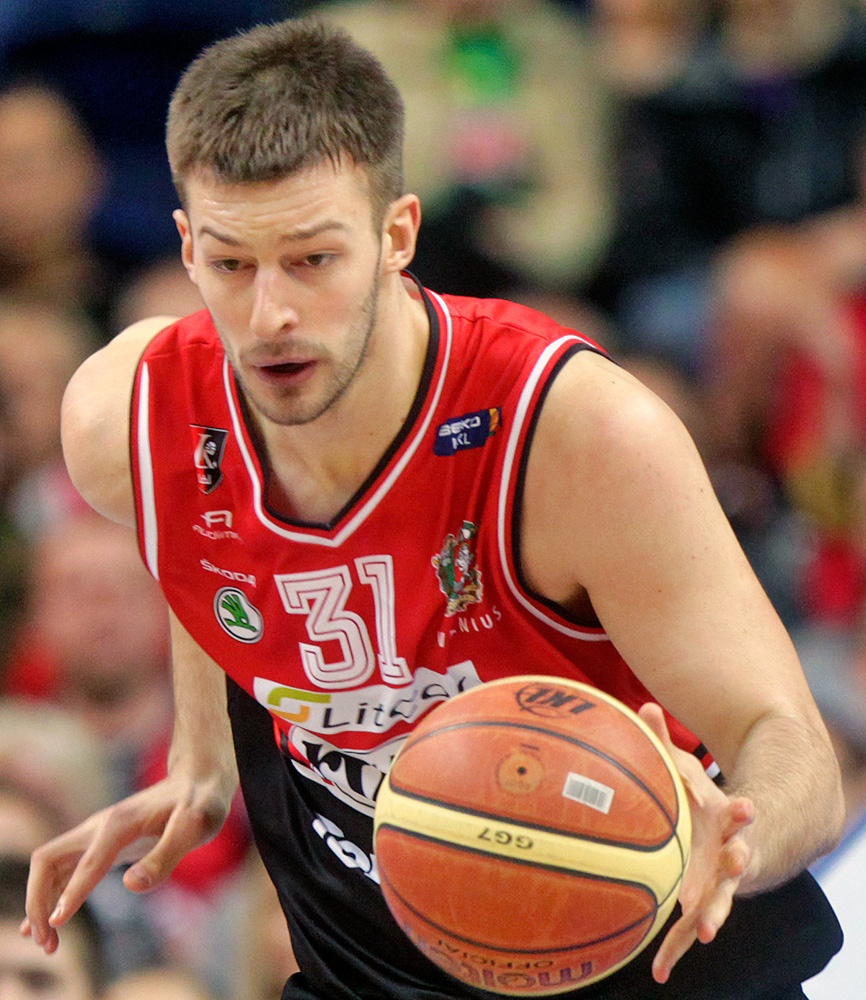
Stevan Jelovac

In December 2021, Serbian forward Stevan Jelovac died due to complications from a brain hemorrhage. AEK retired Jelovac’s number 13 jersey and renamed the training gym inside the new arena the Stevan Jelovac Gymnasium".

==== Coaching Changes and Unsteady Campaigns (2021–2024) ====
In the 2021–22 season, the team started under Stefanos Dedas, but after a few months, Dedas departed to join Dimitris Itoudis’s coaching staff at CSKA Moscow, and Curro Segura stepped in as his replacement; despite important signings, AEK failed to seriously challenge for titles.

In 2022–23, Ilias Kantzouris was appointed head coach, and the club assembled a promising roster with several international players. Akil Mitchell emerged as the team's standout performer, earning a place on the Basketball Champions League First Team, but inconsistency and injuries ultimately resulted in another underwhelming campaign both domestically and in Europe.

The 2023–24 season began with Joan Plaza at the helm, alongside a number of experienced new additions, but internal instability and poor results led to another midseason coaching change, and once again, the team closed the year without major achievements.

=== Dragan Sakota is back 2024–present ===
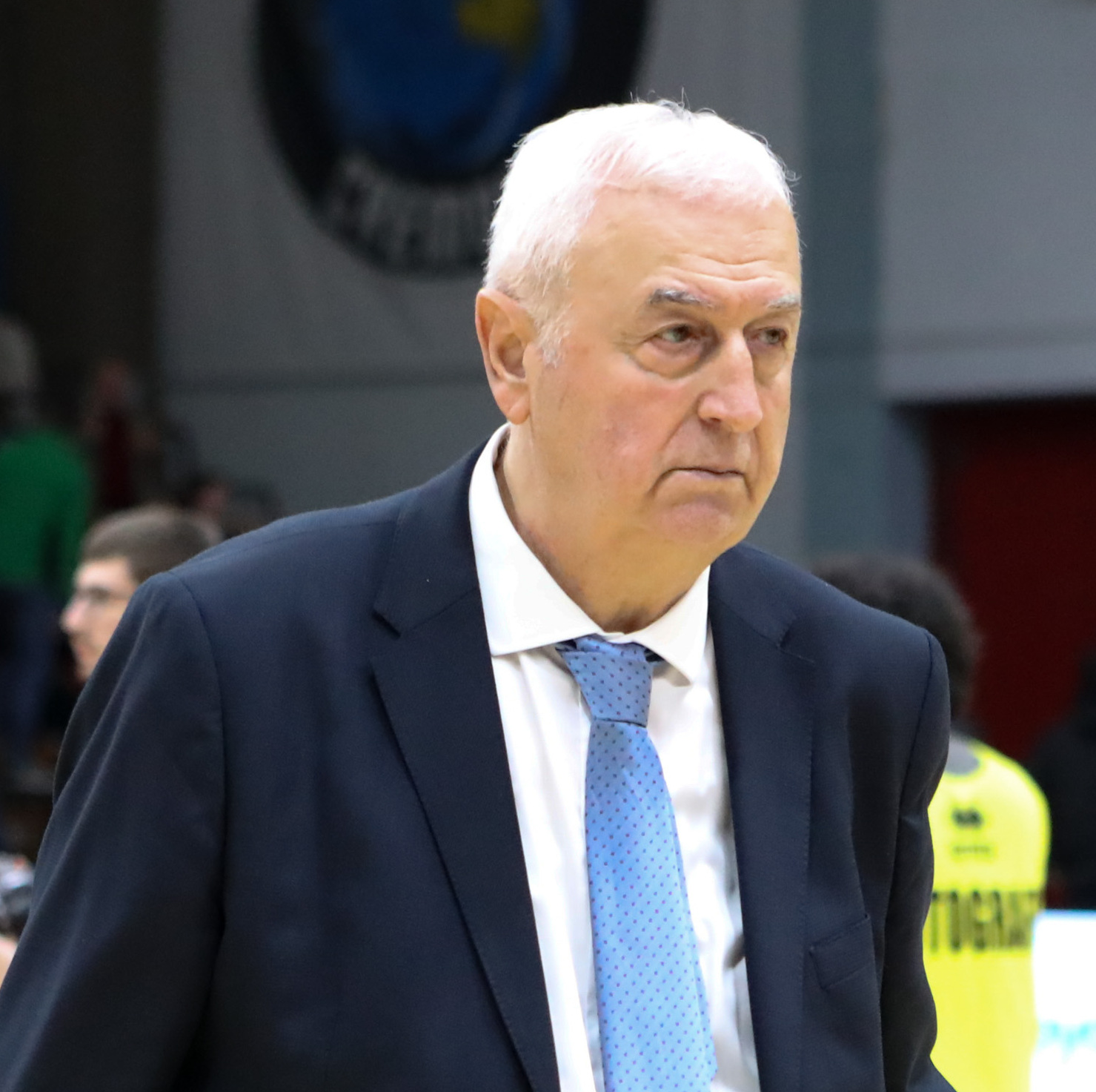
Dragan Sakota

A major turning point came in the summer of 2024, when legendary coach Dragan Šakota returned to lead the team. Šakota, who had famously guided AEK to the 2002 Greek Championship, the 2018 Greek Cup, and the 2018 Basketball Champions League title, had deep ties with the club and was seen as the ideal figure to restore identity, discipline, and ambition. His return was met with great enthusiasm from the fans and signaled a renewed commitment by the organization to reestablish AEK at the top of Greek and European basketball.

Under his leadership, the 2024–25 season proved successful, as AEK finished in third place in both the Greek Basket League and the Basketball Champions League. In the domestic playoffs, AEK secured third place by defeating Promitheas Patras, with a decisive 91–67 win in the placement series. In Europe, AEK reached the Final Four of the Basketball Champions League, which was hosted at the SUNEL Arena in Athens. After a narrow 71–65 loss to Unicaja Málaga in the semifinals, the team rebounded impressively to claim third place by overcoming a 17-point deficit and defeating Lenovo Tenerife 77–73 in the bronze medal game. These results marked a strong step forward in AEK’s efforts to reclaim its place among the continent’s elite clubs.

== Crest, colours ==
Emblem of the Palaiologos dynasty

AEK BC logo (2015–2018)

In 1924, AEK adopted as their emblem, the image of a double-headed eagle. When AEK was created by Greek refugees from Constantinople, in the years following the Greco-Turkish War, and subsequent population exchange, the emblem and colours (yellow and black) were chosen as a reminder of lost homelands; they represent the club's historical ties to Constantinople. After all, the double-headed eagle is featured in the flag of the Greek Orthodox Church, whose headquarters are in Constantinople, and served as the Imperial emblem under the Palaiologos dynasty. The emblem of the department of AEK basketball has evolved over time. From 1924 to 2015, the emblem of the department was similar to that of the football club. Since 2015, AEK B.C. has created a new version of the emblem, by adding to it two stars at its center, which symbolize the club's 2 FIBA Saporta Cup European-wide titles.

The colours of yellow/gold, black and Imperial purple were adopted from AEK's connections with Constantinople and the Byzantine Empire.

=== Kit manufacturers and Shirt sponsors ===
Period	Kit supplier	Shirt sponsor
1976–82	Adidas	Akai
1982–85	Diadora	Syrtex
1985–87	asics	Akai
1987–88	Converse	Casio
1988–89	Nike	Strong Security
1989–90	Nike	PRO-PO
1990–91	Robe di Kappa	Syrtex
1991–92	Robe di Kappa	Fujitsu
1992–93	Converse	Fyrogenis
1993–94	Kronos	—
1994–95	Kronos	KANAKI Dough Products
1995–97	Pony	General Bank of Greece
1997–01	Nike	General Bank of Greece
2001–02	Champion	General Bank of Greece
2002–04	Champion	Piraeus Bank
2004–07	Champion	Fage
2007–08	Champion	Wilkinson Sword
2008–09	k1x	Husqvarna Motorcycles
2009–10	Reebok	Sixt
2010–11	Champion	Chillo Energy Drink
2011–12	Nickan	Byzantine Incorporated
2012–14	Nickan	Diamonds Shipping and Trading
2014–15	Nickan	Skrats
2015	Adidas	Skrats
2015–2018	Fila	Skrats
2018–2021	Fila	betshop.gr
2021–2023	Fila	Betsson
2023–2025	Macron	Betsson
2025-	Macron	SUNEL - The Green Alliance

==== Sponsors ====
- Grand sponsor: SUNEL
- Sponsors: The Green Alliance, Allianz, AVIS, Coco-Mat, VERCHO Paints, L'Oreal, Mythos, Carlsberg, Regency Casino Mont Parnes, Pepsi, Lay's, LG, Nature Valley, Varagons Constructions, Metropolitan Hospital, taxydema, VALSAMIDIS S.A. Elevators, Archocenter, Nova, EpsilonNet, Tzelalis Group
- Partners: ERT, hive Advertising, IN time, TGI

== Supporters ==
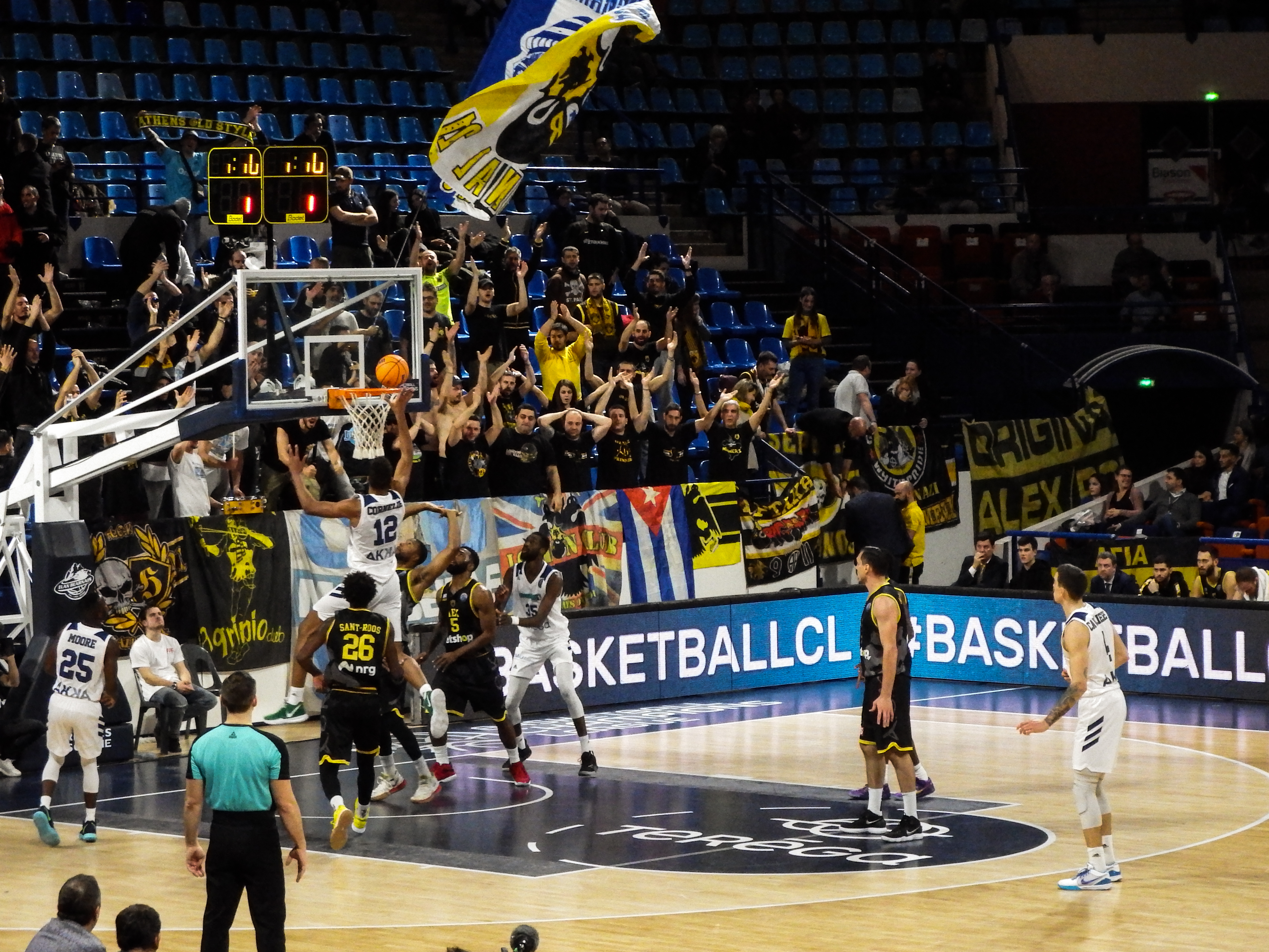
AEK fans in an away game against Élan Béarnais

AEK has a large fan base all over Greece. The majority of AEK supporters are refugees or have refugee descent from Constantinople, and people from the population exchange of the Minor Asia Catastrophe. Original 21 is the largest supporters group. The first attempt to organize AEK supporters was Gate 21 (formed in 1975), which took its name from the gate in the Nikos Goumas Stadium at Nea Filadelfia, where the most hardcore fans of the club gathered. AEK also has many supporters worldwide, most of them being Greek immigrants, in places like North America, UK, Australia, and Cyprus.

=== Rivalries ===
The main rivalries of the AEK are the ones with Panathinaikos and Olympiacos. Against Panathinaikos, the rivalry started not only because of both competing for titles, but also because of the refugee ancestry of AEK fans, and by contrast, that Panathinaikos was considered to be the representative club of the old Athenian high class society. Against Olympiacos, the rivalry is mostly related to the football rivalry of the two clubs.

== Arenas ==
Note: The capacities listed are the capacities of the arenas at the time AEK used them, and are not necessarily the same as the arena's current capacities. Also, the capacities only list the arena's all-seat seating capacity (if applicable), and not the arena's total capacities. In addition, in some cases, the listed capacities only reflect the number of seats currently made publicly available for use, and may not reflect the number of total seats actually in the arena.

Stadium / Arena	Seating Capacity	Usage
Nea Filadelfeia Outdoor Hall (Outdoor Stadium)	500	1952 to early 1960s
Kallimarmaron Stadium (Outdoor Stadium)	80,000	Mid to late 1960s
Sporting Sports Arena	1,862	1970s, 2008–2009
A.S. Ionikos Nea Filadelfeia Indoor Hall	1,500	1980s
Peace and Friendship Stadium	14,940	1988–89
"Georgios Moschos" Nea Filadelfeia Indoor Hall	2,000	1989–1995
O.A.C.A. Olympic Indoor Hall	18,989	1995–2002, 2006–2008, 2014–2021
Zofria Indoor Hall	2,500	2002–2004, 2011–2014
Chalkiopoulio Sports Hall (Lamia)	2,600	2002–2003
Galatsi Olympic Hall	5,141	2004–2006
Hellinikon Olympic Arena	8,000	2009–2011
SUNEL Arena	9,025	2021–

AEK B.C. Stadiums / Arenas Image Gallery
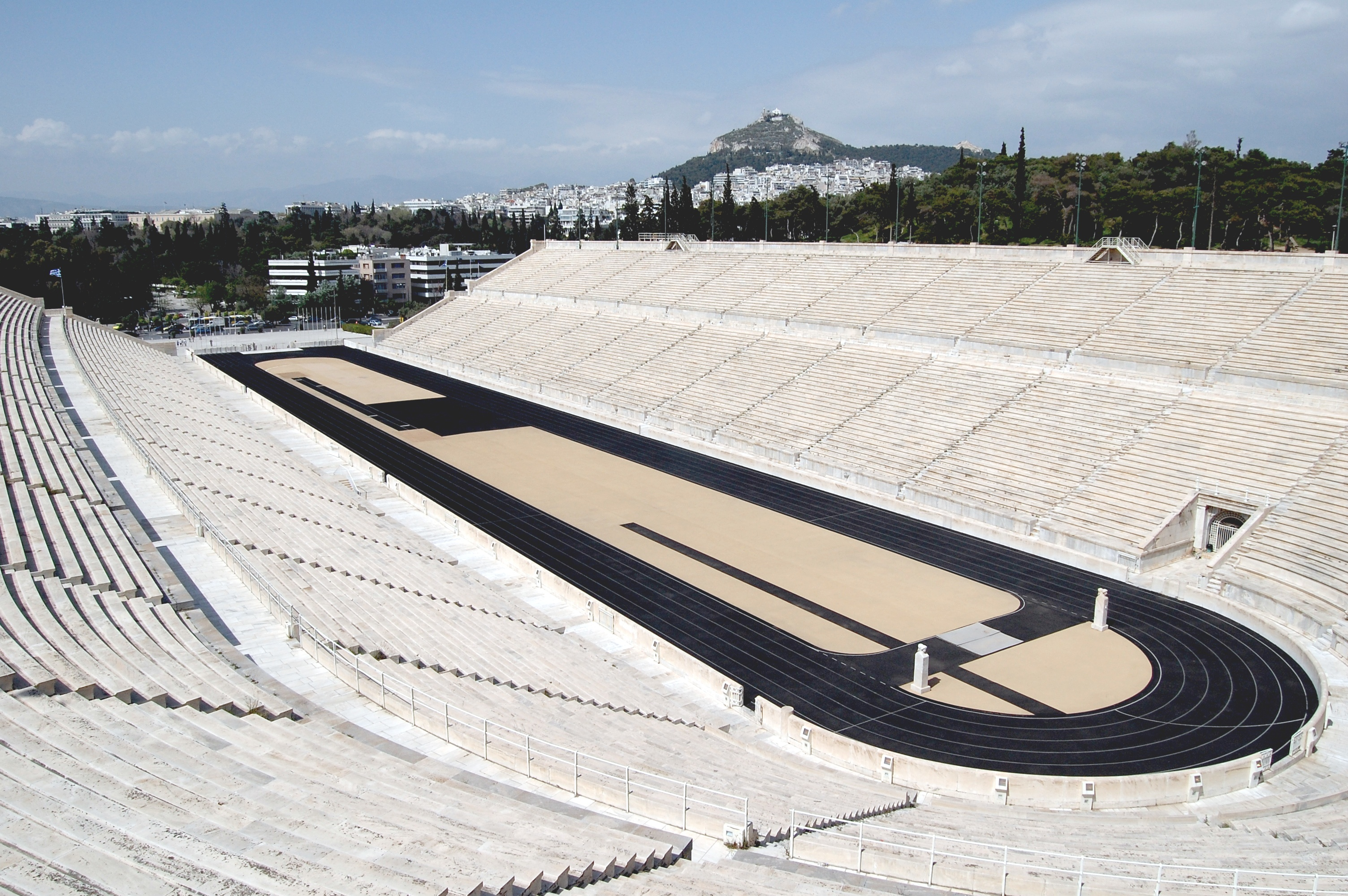
Kallimarmaron Stadium
(Mid to late 1960s)

Sporting Sports Arena
(1970s, 2008–2009)

Peace and Friendship Stadium
(1988–89)

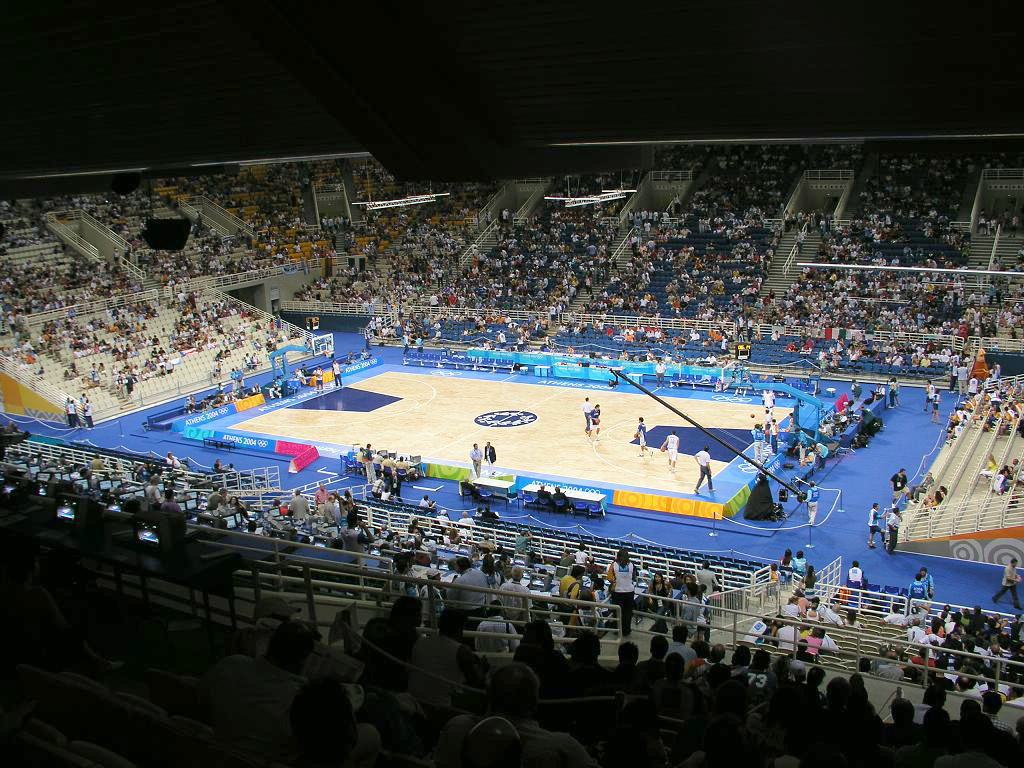
Nikos Galis Olympic Indoor Hall
(1995–2002, 2006–2008, 2014–2020)

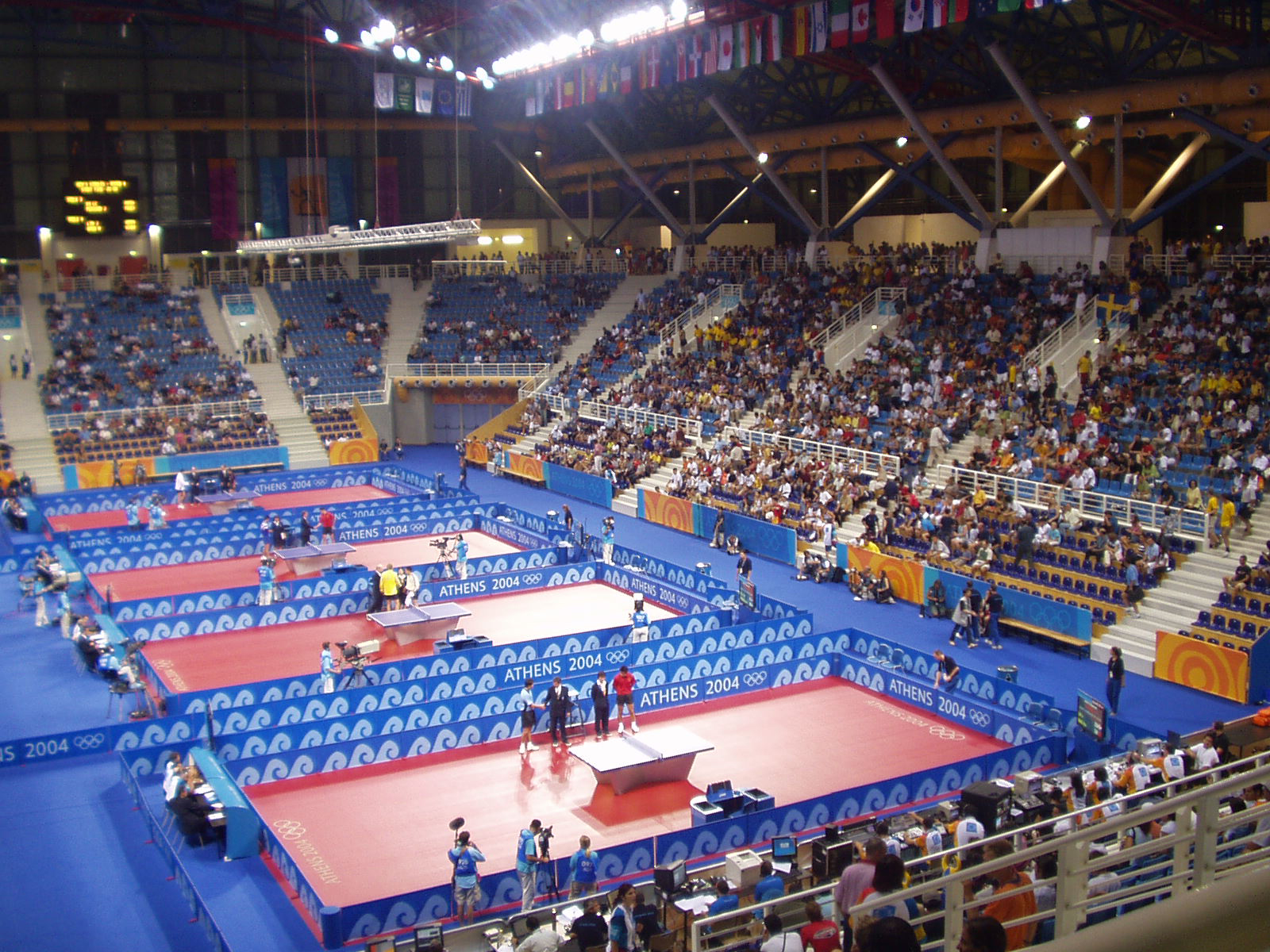
Galatsi Olympic Hall
(2004–2006)

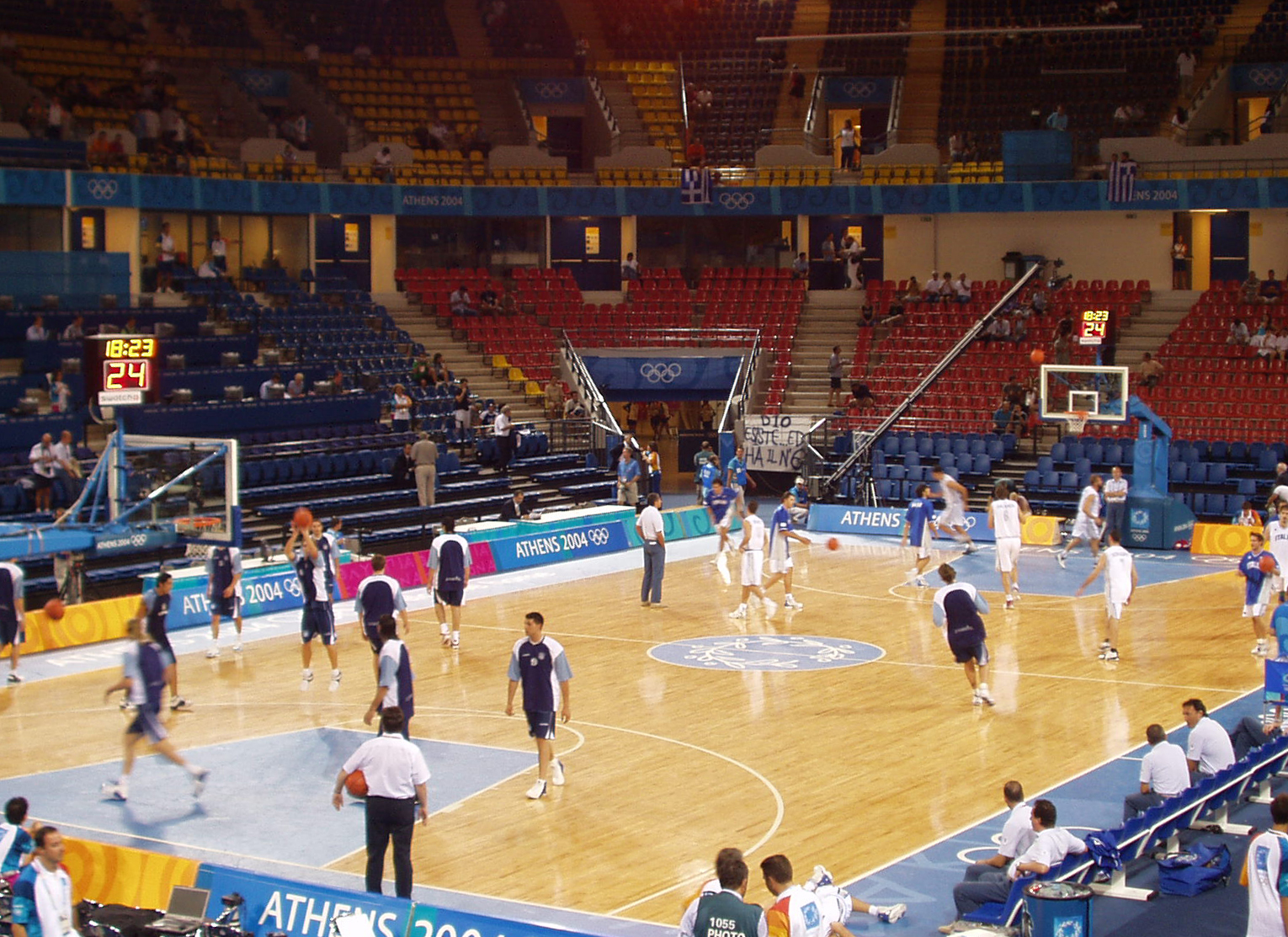
Hellinikon Olympic Arena
(2009–2011)

== Players ==
=== Current roster ===
Note: Flags indicate national team eligibility at FIBA-sanctioned events. Players may hold other non-FIBA nationalities not displayed.

AEK Athens roster
Players
Coaches

Pos.	No.	Nat.	Name	Ht.	Wt.	Age
PF	0	(United States)	Pinckney, DeAndre	2.03 m (6 ft 8 in)	101 kg (223 lb)	26 – 29 February 2000
C	1	(Greece)	Skordilis, Gaios	2.08 m (6 ft 10 in)	125 kg (276 lb)	38 – 6 December 1987
F	2	(United States)	Brown III, Greg	2.06 m (6 ft 9 in)	93 kg (205 lb)	25 – 1 September 2001
SF	3	(United States)	Nolley II, Landers	2.01 m (6 ft 7 in)	94 kg (207 lb)	26 – 5 March 2000
PG	4	(Greece)	Katsivelis, Dimitrios	1.98 m (6 ft 6 in)	96 kg (212 lb)	35 – 1 October 1991
SG	5	(Greece)	Larentzakis, Giannoulis	1.96 m (6 ft 5 in)	95 kg (209 lb)	33 – 22 September 1993
PG	7	(Greece)	Flionis, Dimitris (C)	1.90 m (6 ft 3 in)	84 kg (185 lb)	29 – 8 April 1997
C	8	(United States)	Feazell, KeyShawn	2.08 m (6 ft 10 in)	108 kg (238 lb)	28 – 23 October 1998
PG	9	(Lithuania)	Lekavičius, Lukas	1.81 m (5 ft 11 in)	78 kg (172 lb)	32 – 30 March 1994
SG	16	(Greece)	Gymnopoulos, Stavros	1.93 m (6 ft 4 in)		18 – 27 August 2008
G/F	17	(Greece)	Chartonas, Vasilis	1.95 m (6 ft 5 in)		18 – 21 May 2008
PF	20	(United States)	Williams, Derrick	2.03 m (6 ft 8 in)	109 kg (240 lb)	35 – 25 May 1991
PF	23	(Nigeria)	Joseph, Nelly Junior	2.05 m (6 ft 9 in)	109 kg (240 lb)	25 – 20 November 2001
SG	24	(United States)	Bartley IV, Frank	1.91 m (6 ft 3 in)	97 kg (214 lb)	32 – 25 February 1994
C	35	(Greece)	Tsalmpouris, Georgios	2.18 m (7 ft 2 in)	109 kg (240 lb)	30 – 22 June 1996
PG	77	(France)	Heurtel, Thomas	1.88 m (6 ft 2 in)	82 kg (181 lb)	37 – 10 April 1989
F/C		(Greece)	Bilionis, Charis	2.03 m (6 ft 8 in)		18 – 20 July 2008

Head coach

- (Serbia) (Greece) Dragan Šakota

Assistant coach(es)

- (Serbia) Stevan Mijović
- (Serbia) (Greece) Miloš Šakota
- (Greece) Marinos Konstantis

Athletic trainer(s)

- (Serbia) Μilijan Nikolić

Team manager

- (Greece) Ilias Kekos
- (Greece) Akis Kallinikidis

Legend

- (C) Team captain
- Injured

- Roster
Updated: August 26, 2026

=== Depth chart ===
{{Basketball depth chart | team_name = AEK Athens |starter_c = Nelly Junior Joseph |starter_pf = Derrick Williams |starter_sf = Giannoulis Laretzakis |starter_sg = Frank Bartley IV |starter_pg = Dimitris Flionis

|bench 1_c = KeyShawn Feazell |bench 1_pf = Giorgos Tsalmpouris |bench 1_sf = Giorgos Kalaitzakis |bench 1_sg = Dimitris Katsivelis |bench 1_pg = Thomas Heurtel

|bench 2_c = Gaios Skordilis |bench 2_pf = Charis Blionis |bench 2_sf = Vasilis Chartonas |bench 2_sg = Stavros Gymnopoulos |bench 2_pg = Lucas Lekavičius

|bench 3_c = |bench 3_pf = Greg Brown |bench 3_sf = |bench 3_sg = |bench 3_pg =

== Squad changes for the 2026–27 season ==
=== In ===
Date	Pos.	Player	From
28 June 2026	C	(Nigeria) Nelly Junior Joseph	(France) SIG Strasbourg
1 August 2026	SG	(Greece) Vasilis Chartonas	(Greece) 10 Academy
6 August 2026	SG	(United States) Landers Nolley II	(Syria) Al-Ittihad SC Aleppo
17 August 2026	PF	(United States) Derrick Williams	(South Korea) Suwon KT Sonicboom
25 August 2026	PF	(Greece) Georgios Tsalmpouris	(Greece) Panionios
26 August 2026	PF	(United States) DeAndre Pinckney	(Puerto Rico) Capitanes de Arecibo
10 September 2026	SG	(Greece) Giannoulis Larentzakis	(Greece) Olympiacos
18 September 2026	PG	(France) Thomas Heurtel	(France) ASVEL

=== Out ===
Date	Pos.	Player	To
11 June 2026	PF	(United States) RaiQuan Gray	(Greece) PAOK Thessaloniki
29 July 2026	SF	(Greece) Vassilis Charalampopoulos	(Greece) Aris Thessaloniki
31 July 2026	SG	(Greece) Nikos Arsenopoulos	(Greece) Doxa Lefkadas
31 July 2026	SG	(United States) James Nunnally	Free Agent
31 July 2026	PF	(Lithuania) Mindaugas Kuzminskas	Free Agent
13 August 2026	PF	(Serbia) Marko Pecarski	(Turkey) Merkezefendi
21 August 2026	SG	(Greece) Vassilis Ioannou	(Greece) Papagou (loan)

== Honours ==
AEK B.C. honours aekbc.gr
Type	Competition	Titles	Winners	Runners-up	Third place
Worldwide	FIBA Intercontinental Cup	1	2019		
Continental	EuroLeague	0		1998	2001
Continental	FIBA Champions League	1	2018	2020, 2026	2025
Continental	FIBA Saporta Cup	2	1968, 2000		1970
Domestic	Greek Basketball League	8	1957–58, 1962–63, 1963–64, 1964–65, 1965–66, 1967–68, 1969–70, 2001–02	1954–55, 1966–67, 1968–69, 1970–71, 1973–74, 1996–97, 2002–03, 2004–05, 2019–20	1972–73, 1974–75, 2015–16, 2016–17, 2018–19, 2020–21, 2024–25
Domestic	Greek Basketball Cup	5	1980–81, 1999–00, 2000–01, 2017–18, 2019–20	1975–76, 1977–78, 1979–80, 1987–88, 1991–92, 1997–98, 1998–99	1978-79, 1981-82, 1988-89, 1989-90, 1990-91, 1996–97, 2005-06, 2021–22
Domestic	Greek Basketball Super Cup	0			2021, 2025
Domestic	Greek A2 Basket League	1	2013–14	2011–12	
Regional	Attica State Championship	4	1924–25, 1927–28, 1959–60, 1960–61		
Regional	Attica State Cup	2	1966–67, 1970–71		

AEK Youth B.C. honours
Type	Competition	Titles	Winners	Runners-up	Third place
Domestic	U18 Greek Basketball League	1	2002–03		
Regional	U21 Attica First Division	1	2016–17		
Regional	U18 Attica First Division	3	1949–50, 2002–03, 2017–18		
Regional	U18 Attica Second Division	1	2015–16		
Regional	U16 Attica Second Division	1	2016–17		

- record
- ^{S} Shared record

=== Unofficial team awards ===
- European Double (HBF League or Cup, and FIBA League or Cup)
  - Winners (3): 1967–68, 1999–00, 2017–18
- Intercontinental Treble (HBF League or Cup, FIBA League or Cup, and Club World Cup)
  - Winners (1): 2017–18

== Individual awards and records ==
=== FIBA Intercontinental Cup ===
FIBA Intercontinental Cup MVP

- Jordan Theodore – 2019

FIBA Intercontinental Cup Top Scorer

- Jordan Theodore – 2019

=== FIBA Saporta Cup ===
FIBA Saporta Cup Finals MVP

- Anthony Bowie – 1999–2000

FIBA European Cup Winners' Cup Final Top Scorer

- Georgios Amerikanos – 1967–68

=== Basketball Champions League ===
Basketball Champions League MVP

- Keith Langford – 2019–20
- Manny Harris – 2017–18

Basketball Champions League Final Four MVP

- Mike Green – 2017–18

Basketball Champions League Top Scorer

- Vince Hunter – 2018–19

Basketball Champions League Final Top Scorer

- Mike Green – 2017–18

Basketball Champions League First team

- Keith Langford – 2019–20
- Vince Hunter – 2018–19
- Manny Harris – 2017–18

Basketball Champions League Second team

- Dušan Šakota (2) – 2016–17, 2017–18

Basketball Champions League Efficiency per game leader

- Vince Hunter – 2018–19

Basketball Champions League 2-pointer scoring leader

- Vince Hunter – 2018–19

Basketball Champions League MVP of the Month

- Yanick Moreira – November 2020

Basketball Champions League Game Day MVP

- Vince Hunter (3) – 2018–19 GD4, 2018–19 GD12, 2018–19 GD13
- Manny Harris (2) – 2017–18 GD14, 2017–18 R16
- Howard Sant-Roos – 2019–20 GD9
- Malcolm Griffin – 2018–19 GD8

=== Greek Basket League ===
Greek League MVP

- Dimos Dikoudis – 2001–02

Greek League Finals MVP

- Dimos Dikoudis – 2001–02

Greek League Best Defender

- Howard Sant-Roos – 2018–19

Greek League First team

- Loukas Mavrokefalidis – 2015–16
- Nikos Chatzis – 2003–04

Greek League Best Young Player

- Nikos Zisis – 2001–02
- Dimos Dikoudis – 1999–00

Greek League PIR leader

- Vince Hunter – 2018–19

Greek League Top scorer

- Georgios Amerikanos (2) – 1964–65, 1967–68
- Loukas Mavrokefalidis – 2015–16
- Frank Bartley – 2025–26

Greek League Rebounds leader

- K'zell Wesson – 2007–08

Greek League Steals leader

- Vince Hunter – 2018–19

Greek League 3-pointer scoring leader

- Makis Nikolaidis (3) – 2006–07, 2009–10, 2010–11
- Carl English – 2014–15
- Nikos Chatzis – 2004–05

Greek League 2-pointer scoring leader

- Vince Hunter – 2018–19

Greek League Fouls Drawn leader

- Keith Langford – 2020–21

Greek League free throw scoring leader

- Keith Langford – 2019–20
- Taurean Green – 2009–10

Greek League free throw % made leader

- Mike Green – 2017–18
- Dušan Šakota – 2016–17

Greek League Turnovers leader

- Taurean Green – 2009–10

=== Greek Basketball Cup ===
Greek Cup Final MVP

- Nikos Zisis – 2019–20
- Manny Harris – 2017–18
- İbrahim Kutluay – 2000–01
- Kurt Rambis (Kyriakos Rambidis) – 1980–81

Greek Cup Final Top Scorer

- Kendrick Ray – 2019–20
- İbrahim Kutluay – 2000–01
- Vassilis Goumas – 1980–81

=== HEBA Greek All-Star Game ===
HEBA Greek All-Star

- Nikos Chatzis (6) – 1997–2000, 2004, 2005
- Dimos Dikoudis (4) – 2000-2003
- Jonas Mačiulis (2) – 2019, 2020
- Makis Nikolaidis (2) – 2010, 2011
- Charis Giannopoulos – 2020
- Marcus Slaughter – 2020
- Giannoulis Larentzakis – 2019
- Vassilis Kavvadas – 2018
- Dimitrios Papanikolaou – 2009
- Ioannis Bourousis – 2006
- Toby Bailey – 2005
- Sandro Nicević – 2005
- Nikos Zisis – 2005
- Andreas Glyniadakis – 2004
- Horace Jenkins – 2004
- Christos Tapoutos – 2004
- Andrew Betts – 2003
- Chris Carr – 2002
- Jon Robert Holden – 2002
- Michalis Kakiouzis – 2002
- İbrahim Kutluay – 2001
- Vrbica Stefanov – 2001
- Anthony Bowie – 2000
- Evangelos Koronios – 2000
- Willie Anderson – 1998
- Bill Edwards – 1997
- Dimitrios Podaras – 1994
- Nasos Galakteros – 1992
- Thomas Jordan – 1992
- Kostas Patavoukas – 1992

HEBA Greek All-Star Head Coach

- Giannis Ioannidis (2) – 1997, 1998
- Ilias Papatheodorou – 2020
- Luca Banchi – 2019
- Fotis Katsikaris – 2005
- Dragan Šakota – 2002
- Slobodan Subotić – 1996

HEBA Greek All-Star Game 3-Point Shootout Contest winner

- Nikos Chatzis (2) – 2000, 2003
- Dimitrios Podaras – 1994

HEBA Greek All-Star Game Slam Dunk Contest winner

- Toby Bailey – 2005

HEBA Greek Youth All-Star Game MVP

- Christos Tapoutos – 2003

Rising Stars versus All-Time Stars MVP

- Nikos Rogkavopoulos – 2020

=== Other ===
FIBA Hall of Fame

- Dušan Ivković

50 Greatest EuroLeague Contributors

- Dušan Ivković

EuroLeague Basketball Legend Award

- Dušan Ivković

EuroLeague Basketball 2000–10 All-Decade Team

- Jon Robert Holden

FIBA European Selection

- Georgios Trontzos (2) – 1965, 1967
- Christos Zoupas – 1966

FIBA Europe Young Men's Player of the Year Award

- Nikos Zisis – 2005

FIBA U20 European Championship MVP

- Nikos Zisis – 2002

FIBA U16 European Championship Division 2 MVP

- Nikos Rogkavopoulos – 2017

== Performance in international competitions ==
Season	Achievement	Notes
FIBA Intercontinental Cup
2019	Champions	defeated San Lorenzo, 86–64 (h), in the semi-final and Flamengo, 86–70 (h), in the final in Rio de Janeiro.
FIBA European Champions Cup \ EuroLeague
1964–65	Quarter-finals	eliminated on aggregate, 169–179, by OKK Beograd, 85–78 (W) in Athens and 101–84 (L) in Belgrade.
1965–66	Semi-finals	lost to Slavia VŠ Praha, 103–73 (a), in the semi-final and to CSKA Moscow, 62–85 (h), in the consolation final in Milan.
1997–98	Runners-up	defeated Benetton Treviso, 66–69 (a), in the semi-final and lost to Kinder Bologna, 58–44 (a), in the final in Barcelona.
2000–01	Semi-finals	eliminated by Tau Cerámica, 67–70 (L), 65–90 (L) in Athens, and 76–62 (L) in Vitoria-Gasteiz.
FIBA Champions League
2017–18	Champions	defeated UCAM Murcia, 77–75 (h), in the semi-final and Monaco, 94–100 (a), in the final in Athens.
2018–19	Quarter-finals	eliminated on aggregate, 136–138, by Brose Bamberg, 71–67 (L) in Bamberg and 69–67 (W) in Athens.
2019–20	Runners-up	defeated Casademont Zaragoza, 75–99 (a), in the semi-final and lost to San Pablo Burgos, 85–74 (a), in the final in Athens.
2022–23	Quarter-finals	eliminated by Hapoel Jerusalem, 64–55 (L), 91–51 (L) in Jerusalem and 94–78 (W) in Athens.
2024–25	Semi-finals	lost to Unicaja Málaga, 65–71 (h), in the semi-final and defeated La Laguna Tenerife, 73–77 (a), in the consolation final in Athens.
2025–26	Runners-up	defeated Unicaja Málaga, 65–78 (a), in the semi-final and lost to Rytas, 86–92 (h), in the final in Badalona.
FIBA European Cup Winners' Cup \ Saporta Cup
1967–68	Champions	defeated Ignis Varese on aggregate, 132–130, in the semi-finals and Slavia VŠ Praha, 89–82 (h), in the final in Athens.
1969–70	Semi-finals	eliminated on aggregate, 134–143, by JA Vichy, 78–60 (L) in Vichy and 74–65 (W) in Athens.
1971–72	Quarter-finals	defeated Levski on aggregate, 184–170, in the second-round games, but eliminated in the group stage by Crvena zvezda and Simmenthal Milano.
1988–89	Quarter-finals	defeated Pully Foxes on aggregate, 173–168, in the eight-final games, but eliminated in the group stage by Žalgiris, Cibona and Steiner Bayreuth.
1999–00	Champions	defeated KK Zadar on aggregate, 152–142, in the semi-finals and Kinder Bologna, 83–76 (h), in the final in Lausanne.

== The European and worldwide cup glory paths ==
1967–68 FIBA European Cup Winners' Cup

Round	Team	Home	Away
R1	Bye		
R2	(Spain) Kas Vitoria	85–65	82–72
QF	(Belgium) Royal IV	76–54	74–54
SF	(Italy) Ignis Varese	72–52	78–60
F	(Czechoslovakia) Slavia VŠ Praha	89–82	

2019 FIBA Intercontinental Cup

Round	Team	Home	Away
SF	(Argentina) San Lorenzo de Almagro	86–64	
F	(Brazil) C.R. Flamengo	86–70	

1997–98 FIBA EuroLeague

Round	Team	Home	Away
R1	(France) PSG Racing	57–52	76–52
R1	(Slovenia) Union Olimpija	74–65	71–74
R1	(Italy) Teamsystem Bologna	80–57	70–67
R1	(Croatia) Cibona	70–55	67–63
R1	(Germany) Alba Berlin	79–80	60–67
R2	(Israel) Hapoel Jerusalem	65–51	68–83
R2	(Turkey) Ülker	81–73	63–70
R2	(Federal Republic of Yugoslavia) Partizan	68–76	71–73
L16	(Croatia) Split	76–46	54–62
QF	(Germany) Alba Berlin	88–68	58–82
SF	(Italy) Benetton Treviso	66–69	
F	(Italy) Kinder Bologna	58–44	

1999–00 FIBA Saporta Cup

Round	Team	Home	Away
GS	(Finland) Honka Playboys	88–51	64–76
GS	(Bulgaria) Cherno More Varna	103–75	81–103
GS	(Israel) Hapoel Jerusalem	69–53	77–82
GS	(Belgium) Spirou	83–63	80–62
GS	(Russia) Avtodor Saratov	83–59	60–78
L32	(Slovenia) KD Hopsi Polzela	68–44	51–86
L16	(Spain) TAU Cerámica	85–65	67–71
QF	(Greece) Iraklis	84–73	73–70
SF	(Croatia) Zadar	82–67	75–70
F	(Italy) Kinder Bologna	83–76	

2017–18 FIBA Champions League

Round	Team	Home	Away
GS	(Turkey) Banvit	70–74	78–71
GS	(Germany) medi bayreuth	83–81	80–73
GS	(Spain) Movistar Estudiantes	79–87	78–85
GS	(Slovenia) Petrol Olimpija	91–73	71–80
GS	(Poland) Rosa Radom	96–92	63–69
GS	(France) SIG Strasbourg	87–88	80–78
GS	(Italy) Umana Reyer Venezia	84–64	101–103
L16	(Czech Republic) ČEZ Nymburk	88–98	82–93
QF	(France) SIG Strasbourg	78–69	83–83
SF	(Spain) UCAM Murcia	77–75	
F	(France) Monaco	100–94	

2019–20 FIBA Champions League

Round	Team	Home	Away
GS	(Israel) Hapoel Jerusalem	91–78	85–78
GS	(Turkey) Bandırma BK	84–96	50–68
GS	(Poland) Anwil Włocławek	83–72	77–79
GS	(France) EB Pau-Lacq-Orthez	102–82	67–79
GS	(Belgium) Telenet Giants Antwerp	62–51	73–61
GS	(Germany) Rasta Vechta	75–79	70–81
GS	(Spain) San Pablo Burgos	74–66	93–76
L16	(Germany) Telekom Baskets Bonn	92–85	86–90
QF	(Czech Republic) ERA Nymburk	82–94	
SF	(Spain) Casademont Zaragoza	99–75	
F	(Spain) San Pablo Burgos	85–74	

2025–26 FIBA Champions League

Round	Team	Home	Away	Home
GS	(Hungary) NHSZ-Szolnoki Olajbányász	91–77	80–69	
GS	(Slovakia) Patrioti Levice	99–88	69–71	
GS	(Latvia) VEF Rīga	95–64	53–69	
L16	(Germany) Alba Berlin	88–80	88–93	
L16	(Greece) ASK Karditsa	88–73	62–90	
L16	(Turkey) Tofaş	96–88	90–93	
QF	(Spain) Joventut Badalona	87–84	88–66	72–67
SF	(Spain) Unicaja Málaga	65–78		
F	(Lithuania) Rytas	86–92 (OT)		

== Season-by-season ==
=== All competitions ===
Season	Greek League	Greek Cup	Greek Super Cup	Europe	Worldwide	Head Coach	Roster
1927–28	Knockout game	Not held		Not held			Kostas Dimopoulos, Evmenis Athanasiadis, Simeonidis
1950–51	Tier 2 1st place (promoted to Tier 1)	Not held		Not held			Konstantinos Karamanlis
1952–53	4th place	Not held		Not held			Konstantinos Karamanlis
1954–55	2nd place	Not held		Not held			Konstantinos Karamanlis
1956–57	4th place	Not held		Not held			Konstantinos Karamanlis
1957–58	Champion	Not held		_		Konstantinos Karamanlis	Dermanoutsos, Babanikolos, Evagelatos, Karamanlis, Papathanasiou, Vangelis Sevdinoglou, Tzekos, Tzilitzoglou, Hatziraptis, Terkesidis, Ksenoudakis, Theodoropoulos
1958–59	5th place	Not held		Champions Cup; Last 16			Dermanoutsos, Babanikolos, Evagelatos, Karamanlis, Papathanasiou, Vangelis Sevdinoglou, Tzekos, Tzilitzoglou, Hatziraptis, Terkesidis
1959–60	5th place	Not held		_			
1960–61	6th place	Not held		_			
1962–63	Champion	Not held		_		Missas Pantazopoulos	Georgios Amerikanos, Stelios Vasileiadis, Eas Larentzakis, Dermanoutsos, Lakis Tsavas, Georgios Moschos, Vangelis Nikitopoulos, Babanikolos, Antonis Christeas, Georgios Ekonomou, Attalas
1963–64	Champion	Not held		Champions Cup; Last 32		Missas Pantazopoulos	Georgios Amerikanos, Stelios Vasileiadis, Eas Larentzakis, Dermanoutsos, Lakis Tsavas, Georgios Moschos, Vangelis Nikitopoulos, Babanikolos, Antonis Christeas, Georgios Ekonomou, Attalas, Christos Zoupas, Georgios Trontzos, Theodoropoulos
1964–65	Champion	Not held		Champions Cup; Last 8		Missas Pantazopoulos	Georgios Amerikanos, Stelios Vasileiadis, Eas Larentzakis, Dermanoutsos, Lakis Tsavas, Georgios Moschos, Vangelis Nikitopoulos, Antonis Christeas, Georgios Ekonomou, Christos Zoupas, Georgios Trontzos, Theodoropoulos, Nikos Nesiadis
1965–66	Champion	Not held		Champions Cup; 4th place		Missas Pantazopoulos / Themis Cholevas	Georgios Amerikanos, Stelios Vasileiadis, Eas Larentzakis, Dermanoutsos, Lakis Tsavas, Georgios Moschos, Vangelis Nikitopoulos, Antonis Christeas, Georgios Ekonomou, Christos Zoupas, Georgios Trontzos, Theodoropoulos, Nikos Nesiadis
1966–67	2nd place	?		Champions Cup; Last 16			Georgios Amerikanos, Stelios Vasileiadis, Eas Larentzakis, Dermanoutsos, Lakis Tsavas, Georgios Moschos, Vangelis Nikitopoulos, Antonis Christeas, Georgios Ekonomou, Christos Zoupas, Georgios Trontzos, Theodoropoulos, Nikos Nesiadis
1967–68	Champion	Not held		Cup Winners' Cup; Winner		Nikos Milas	Antonis Christeas, Georgios Amerikanos, Stelios Vasileiadis, Eas Larentzakis, Christos Zoupas, Georgios Trontzos, Lakis Tsavas, Nikos Nesiadis, Andreas Dimitriadis, Petros Petrakis
1968–69	2nd place	Not held		Champions Cup; Last 16		Nikos Milas	Antonis Christeas, Georgios Amerikanos, Stelios Vasileiadis, Eas Larentzakis, Christos Zoupas, Georgios Trontzos, Lakis Tsavas, Nikos Nesiadis, Giannis Galaris, Andreas Dimitriadis, Vamvaleros, Protopapas, Rigas
1969–70	Champion	Not held		Cup Winners' Cup; Last 4		Nikos Milas	Antonis Christeas, Georgios Amerikanos, Stelios Vasileiadis, Eas Larentzakis, Christos Zoupas, Georgios Trontzos, Nikos Nesiadis, Stavros Vafopoulos, Vilis, Vogdanidis, Dianas, Vasilis Nidriotis, Spiliotis, Christoforou
1970–71	2nd place	?		Champions Cup; Last 16		Nikos Milas	Georgios Trontzos, Stelios Vasileiadis, Eas Larentzakis, Georgios Amerikanos, Stavros Vafopoulos, Loukas Kontos, Christos Zoupas, Christoforou
1971–72	4th place	Not held		Cup Winners' Cup; Last 8		Nikos Milas	Georgios Trontzos, Stelios Vasileiadis, Eas Larentzakis, Georgios Amerikanos, Christos Zoupas, Stavros Vafopoulos
1972–73	3rd place	Not held		_		Nikos Milas	Georgios Trontzos, Stelios Vasileiadis, Eas Larentzakis, Georgios Amerikanos, Stavros Vafopoulos
1973–74	2nd place	Not held		Korać Cup; Last 12		Nikos Milas	Georgios Trontzos, Stelios Vasileiadis, Eas Larentzakis, Georgios Amerikanos, Stavros Vafopoulos
1974–75	3rd place	Not held		Cup Winners' Cup; Last 16		Kostas Mourouzis	Michalis Giannouzakos, Loukas Kontos, Georgios Trontzos, Nikos Nesiadis, Georgios Amerikanos
1975–76	4th place	Finalist		Korać Cup; Last 16		Kostas Mourouzis	Michalis Giannouzakos, Loukas Kontos, Tsoskounoglou, Kantelis, Papadatos, Georgios Trontzos, Nikos Nesiadis, Vasilis Nidriotis
1976–77	6th place	Last 26		Cup Winners' Cup; Last 32		Kostas Mourouzis	Michalis Giannouzakos, Loukas Kontos, Minas Gekos, Georgios Trontzos
1977–78	7th place	Finalist		Korać Cup; Last 16		Faidon Matthaiou	Minas Gekos, Georgios Trontzos, Michalis Giannouzakos, Bogatsiotis, Kanakakis, Vafopoulos, Karteroliotis, Vangelis Fotsis
1978–79	4th place	Last 4		_		Faidon Matthaiou	Minas Gekos, Georgios Trontzos, Vangelis Fotsis
1979–80	5th place	Finalist		Korać Cup; Last 16		Georgios Trontzos	Michalis Giannouzakos, Pavlos Stamelos, Minas Gekos, Vassilis Goumas, Kanakakis, Vangelis Fotsis, A. Koroneos, Pantazis, Toskounoglou
1980–81	4th place	Winner		Korać Cup; Last 16		Fred Develey	Vassilis Goumas, Kurt Rambis, Minas Gekos, Kanakakis, Giannopoulos, Vangelis Fotsis, Nikos Apostolidis
1981–82	4th place	Last 4		Cup Winners' Cup; Last 16		Fred Develey	Minas Gekos, Vassilis Goumas, Nikos Apostolidis, Vangelis Fotsis
1982–83	4th place			Korać Cup; Last 32		Vangelis Nikitopoulos	Minas Gekos, Vassilis Goumas, Nikos Apostolidis, Thanasis Skourtopoulos, Charis Papazoglou, Vangelis Fotsis
1983–84	5th place			Korać Cup; Last 16		Vangelis Nikitopoulos	Minas Gekos, Apostolos Kontos, Yorgos Agiasotelis, Vassilis Goumas, Nikos Apostolidis, Thanasis Skourtopoulos, Charis Papazoglou, Vangelis Fotsis, Takis Tsoukas, Kostas Tsamalis, Dean Tolson
1984–85	6th place			Korać Cup; Last 16		Vangelis Nikitopoulos	Minas Gekos, Apostolos Kontos, Yorgos Agiasotelis, Vassilis Goumas, Nikos Apostolidis, Thanasis Skourtopoulos, Charis Papazoglou, Vangelis Fotsis, Takis Tsoukas, Kostas Tsamalis, Merkouriadis
1985–86	9th place			Korać Cup; Last 16		Vangelis Nikitopoulos, Michalis Anastasiadis, Nikos Nesiadis	Minas Gekos, Kostas Patavoukas, Apostolos Kontos, Yorgos Agiasotelis, Nikos Apostolidis, Thanasis Skourtopoulos, Vangelis Fotsis, Thanasis Katsigiannis, Takis Tsoukas, Achilleas Tountas, Kostas Tsamalis, John Niakaros, Karamanos
1986–87	7th place	Last 8		_		Michalis Anastasiadis, Kostas Anastasatos, Georgios Amerikanos	Minas Gekos, Kostas Patavoukas, Alexis Giannopoulos, Apostolos Kontos, Yorgos Agiasotelis, Panagiotis Aridas, Nikos Apostolidis, Thanasis Skourtopoulos, Vangelis Fotsis, Thanasis Katsigiannis, Yorgos Nasou, Lefteris Matzikas
1987–88	4th place	Finalist		_		Vangelis Nikitopoulos	Kostas Patavoukas, Minas Gekos, Panagiotis Aridas, Alexis Giannopoulos, Yorgos Sakellariou, Yorgos Agiasotelis, Thanasis Skourtopoulos, Kostas Mihelidakis, Vangelis Fotsis, Thanasis Katsigiannis, Yorgos Nasou
1988–89	6th place	Last 4		Cup Winners' Cup; Last 8		Krešimir Ćosić, Nikos Nesiadis	Danny Vranes, Kostas Patavoukas, Minas Gekos, Panagiotis Aridas, Alexis Giannopoulos, Yorgos Agiasotelis, Christos Kountourakis, Vassilis Lanes, Thanasis Skourtopoulos, Vagelis Voutselas, Achilleas Tountas, Kostas Mihelidakis, Clint Richardson
1989–90	6th place	Last 4		_		Vangelis Nikitopoulos	Nasos Galakteros, Kostas Patavoukas, Jim Usevitch, Minas Gekos, Panagiotis Aridas, Alexis Giannopoulos, Vassilis Lanes, Christos Kountourakis, Chris Kostouros, Thanasis Skourtopoulos, Achilleas Tountas, Vagelis Voutselas, Kostas Mihelidakis
1990–91	5th place	Last 4		Korać Cup; Last 32		Krešimir Ćosić	Nasos Galakteros, Minas Gekos, Thomas Jordan, Panagiotis Aridas, Christos Kountourakis, Kostas Patavoukas, Ivo Petović, Richard Rellford, Fotis Katsikaris, Thanasis Skourtopoulos, Vangelis Voutselas, Triantafyllos Pantazis, Manolis Souliotis, Alexandros Koukakis, Achilleas Tountas
1991–92	4th place	Finalist		Korać Cup; Last 16		Vangelis Nikitopoulos	Nasos Galakteros, Kostas Patavoukas, Thomas Jordan, Christos Papasarantou, Fotis Katsikaris, Vassilis Lanes, Panagiotis Aridas, Christos Kountourakis, Dimitris Podaras, Christos Papasarantou, Alexandros Koukakis, Triantafyllos Pantazis, Manolis Souliotis, Giorgos Pioukas, Dragoumaniotis, Antonis Ladas, Fotis Georgoulis, Carlton McKinney
1992–93	6th place			Korać Cup; Last 32		Michalis Kyritsis, Richard Dukeshire, Nikos Nesiadis	Derrick Hamilton, Rod Sellers, Miloš Babić, Nasos Galakteros, Kostas Patavoukas, Dimitris Podaras, Vassilis Lanes, Giorgos Yannopoulos, Fotis Katsikaris, Alexandros Koukakis, Christos Kountourakis, Christos Papasarantou, Giorgos Pioukas, Manolis Souliotis
1993–94	8th place			Korać Cup; Last 64		Steve Giatzoglou, Apostolos Kontos	Tony Costner, Tony White, Rastko Cvetković, Jack Haley, Kannard Johnson, Dimitris Podaras, Vassilis Lanes, Alexis Giannopoulos, Fotis Katsikaris, Alexandros Koukakis, Christos Kountourakis, Dejan Lakićević, Christos Papadopoulos, Giorgos Pioukas, Nikos Kritsalos
1994–95	8th place			_		Vlade Đurović	Rolando Blackman, Tim Burroughs, Dimitris Podaras, Yannis Gakis, Minas Gekos, Kostas Ikonomakis, Fotis Katsikaris, Alexandros Koukakis, Giorgos Kuklakis, Dejan Lakićević, Mirko Milićević, Nikos Nusis, Christos Papasarantou, Manolis Souliotis, Nikos Kritsalos
1995–96	10th place	4th place		Korać Cup; Last 16		Nikos Nesiadis, Lefteris Subotić	Marcus Liberty, Andy Toolson, Anthony Pelle, Kostas Ikonomakis, Nikos Chatzis, Michalis Kakiouzis, Panagiotis Barlas, Fotis Katsikaris, Dimitris Papadopoulos, Dimitris Podaras, Kostas Zervas, Giorgos Kuklakis, Christos Liggos, Nikos Nusis
1996–97	2nd place	3rd place		_		Giannis Ioannidis	Victor Alexander, Bill Edwards, Roberto Chiacig, Claudio Coldebella, Nikos Chatzis, Michalis Kakiouzis, Mikkel Larsen, Pete Papachronis, Dimitris Podaras, Stefano Attruia, Giorgos Kuklakis, Kostas Zervas
1997–98	4th place	Finalist		EuroLeague; Finalist		Giannis Ioannidis	Bane Prelević, Victor Alexander, Willie Anderson, Ricky Pierce, Claudio Coldebella, José Lasa, Michael Andersen, Mikkel Larsen, Jake Tsakalidis, Michalis Kakiouzis, Nikos Chatzis, Dimitris Papadopoulos
1998–99	5th place	Finalist		Saporta Cup; Last 32		Georgios Kalafatakis, Fotis Katsikaris, Kostas Politis	Joe Arlauckas, Branislav Prelević, Lloyd Daniels, Michael Andersen, Jake Tsakalidis, Dimos Dikoudis, Nikos Chatzis, Michalis Kakiouzis, Angelos Koronios, Prodromos Nikolaidis, Panagiotis Barlas, Dimitris Papadopoulos, Ruben Patterson, Brandon Williams
1999–2000	4th place	Winner		Saporta Cup; Winner		Dušan Ivković	Michalis Kakiouzis, Angelos Koronios, Dimos Dikoudis, Jake Tsakalidis, Nikos Chatzis, Martin Müürsepp, Anthony Bowie, Steve Hansell, Dimitris Misiakos
2000–01	4th place	Winner		EuroLeague; Semi-finalist		Dušan Ivković	İbrahim Kutluay, Vrbica Stefanov, Andrew Betts, Michalis Kakiouzis, Dimos Dikoudis, Martin Müürsepp, Nikos Chatzis, Geert Hammink, Vassilis Kikilias, Spyros Panteliadis
2001–02	Champion	Last 16		EuroLeague; Last 16		Dragan Šakota	J. R. Holden, Nikos Zisis, Christos Tapoutos, Nikos Chatzis, Vassilis Kikilias, Dimos Dikoudis, Jim Bilba, Andrew Betts, Michalis Kakiouzis, Ioannis Bourousis, Chris Carr, Arijan Komazec, Spyros Panteliadis, Kostas Paschalis, Lazić
2002–03	2nd place	Last 8		EuroLeague; Last 24		Dragan Šakota	Michalis Kakiouzis, Dimos Dikoudis, Nikos Chatzis, Nikos Zisis, Roderick Blakney, Andrew Betts, Joe Crispin, Christos Tapoutos, Ioannis Bourousis, Pero Antić, Vassilis Kikilias, Kostas Paschalis, Nikola Jestratijević, John Rillie, Giorgos Tsiaras, Steve Woodberry, Dimos Angelopoulos, Spyros Magkounis
2003–04	4th place	Last 8		EuroLeague; Last 24		Fotis Katsikaris	Horace Jenkins, Nikos Chatzis, Nikos Zisis, Christos Tapoutos, Ioannis Bourousis, Andreas Glyniadakis, Pero Antić, Kristopher Hill, Quadre Lollis, Spyros Magkounis, Dimitris Misiakos, Sotiris Nikolaidis, Pantelis Papaioakim, Nikos Papanikolaou, Blagota Sekulić, Giorgos Sourlis, Giorgos Tsiaras
2004–05	2nd place	Last 8		EuroLeague; Last 16		Fotis Katsikaris	Toby Bailey, Nikos Chatzis, Nikos Zisis, Quadre Lollis, Andreas Glyniadakis, Ioannis Bourousis, Sandro Nicević, Pero Antić, Michalis Pelekanos, Yannis Kakiouzis, Davor Kus, Spyros Magkounis, Alexandros Melniks, Sotiris Nikolaidis, Nikos Papanikolaou, Giorgos Tsiaras
2005–06	7th place	Last 4		EuroLeague; Last 24		Lefteris Kakiousis	Ioannis Bourousis, Lionel Chalmers, Taylor Coppenrath, Michalis Pelekanos, Slaven Rimac, Jerel Blassingame, Dror Hajaj, Giannis Kalampokis, Spyros Panteliadis, Pantelis Papaioakim, Amit Tamir, Giorgos Tsiaras, Spyros Magkounis, Nikos Papanikolaou, Anestis Matos, Ioannis Athanasoulas
2006–07	9th place	Last 8		EuroCup; Last 32		Vangelis Alexandris, Soulis Markopoulos	Nestoras Kommatos, Brent Scott, Christos Tapoutos, Prodromos Nikolaidis, Nikos Vetoulas, Jasmin Perković, Sotiris Nikolaidis, Lavelle Felton, Ioannis Gagaloudis, Joško Garma, Ante Grgurević, Kostas Maglos, Antonios Michaloglou, Nikos Papanikolaou, Adrian Penland, Spyros Magkounis, Panteleimon Kakavas, Ioannis Athanasoulas, Marios Sakellarakis
2007–08	7th place	Last 8		EuroChallenge; Last 32		Angelos Koronios, Dimitris Priftis, Vangelis Angelou	Alexis Kyritsis, K'Zell Wesson, Christos Tapoutos, Amara Sy, William Avery, Nikos Barlos, Kostas Charissis, Nikos Chatzis, Dimitris Papanikolaou, Filiberto Rivera, Smiljan Pavič, Vassilis Simtsak, Giannis Sioutis, Saša Vasiljević, Angelos Tsamis
2008–09	9th place	Last 8		_		Kostas Flevarakis	D.J. Thompson, Travon Bryant, Tarmo Kikerpill, Christos Tapoutos, Dimitris Papanikolaou, Nikos Chatzis, Michael Andersen, Giannis Kyriakopoulos, Kostas Stamatis, Fotis Vasilopoulos, Periklis Dorkofikis, István Németh, Tasos Antonakis, Zois Ballas
2009–10	10th place			_		Kostas Flevarakis, Argyris Pedoulakis, Minas Gekos	Kostas Stamatis, Periklis Dorkofikis, Tasos Antonakis, Avraam Kallinikidis, Torin Francis, Lamont Mack, Prodromos Nikolaidis, Taurean Green, Stavros Toutziarakis, Riste Stefanov, Martynas Mažeika, Rodrigue Mels, Andronikos Gizogiannis, Nondas Papantoniou, Vangelis Tzolos, Christos Marinos
2010–11	13th place (relegated to A2)	Last 32		_		Minas Gekos, Angelos Koronios	Periklis Dorkofikis, Dimos Dikoudis, Akis Kallinikidis, Prodromos Nikolaidis, Nikos Papanikolaou, Terrel Castle, Jarrett Hart, Flinder Boyd, Darko Cohadarevic, Vukašin Mandić, Sharaud Curry, Tasos Antonakis, Vangelis Tzolos, Kostas Stamatis, Kostas Tsaprounis, Angelos Matos, Anthony Grundy, Rodrigue Mels, Patrick Sparks, Lamont Mack
2011–12	A2 Division 2nd place (relegated intentionally at the B Division, due to financial problems)	_		_		Kostas Oikonomakis, Dimitris Liogas, Dimitris Papanikolaou, Nikos Karagiannis, D. Papadopoulos	Antonis Mantzaris, Petros Noeas, Vangelis Tzolos, Vangelis Sklavos, Stavros Kokkinopoulos, Fotis Vasilopoulos, Alexis Falekas, Angelos Siamandouras, Thanasis Magonis, Dimitris Despos, Nikos Kourtis, Leonidas Magoulas, Entry Katsupaj, Christos Kalpakis, Babis Fotitzoglou, Dimitris Papadimitriou
2012–13	B Division 3rd place (promoted to A2)	_		_		Vangelis Ziagkos	Dionysis Veskoukis, Andronikos Gizogiannis, Vangelis Tzolos, Alexis Falekas, Angelos Siamandouras, Vangelis Koukouravas, Giannis Stoukas, Giorgos Kopsaftis, Michalis Polytarchou, Dimitris Despos, Kostas Tsaprounis, Nikos Kapetzoglou, Giannis Vavatsikos
2013–14	A2 Division 1st place (promoted to A1)	_		_		Vangelis Ziagkos	Andronikos Gizogiannis, Alexis Falekas, Thodoris Tsiotras, Michalis Polytarchou, Dimitris Despos, Vangelis Karampoulas, Kostas Papantonakos, Stathis Papadionysiou, Vangelis Drosos, Stefan Nikolić, Spyros Panagiotaras, Giorgos Tsiakos, Giannis Stoukas, Nikos Zeginoglou
2014–15	5th place	Last 10		_		Vangelis Ziagkos; Dragan Šakota	Leonidas Kaselakis, Stathis Papadionysiou, Zisis Sarikopoulos, Michalis Kamperidis, Stefan Nikolić, Michalis Polytarchou, Giorgos Tsiakos, Giorgos Boutris, Garett Williamson, Dušan Šakota, Nondas Papantoniou, Milan Milošević, Carl English, Tomas Delininkaitis, Pops Mensah-Bonsu, Malik Hairston, Scottie Wilbekin
2015–16	3rd place	Last 8		EuroCup; Regular season		Dragan Šakota; Jure Zdovc	Dimitrios Moraitis, Dimitrios Katsivelis, T. J. Carter, Philip Scrubb, Zisis Sarikopoulos, Malik Hairston, Chris Warren, O. D. Anosike, Dionte Christmas, Georgios Tsalmpouris, Giannis Kalampokis, Edin Atić, Nikos Kamarianos, Dušan Šakota, D. J. Cooper, Nondas Papantoniou, Milan Milošević, Loukas Mavrokefalidis, J'Covan Brown, Dimitrios Mavroeidis, Taurean Green, Malcolm Armstead, Micheal Eric
2016–17	3rd place	Last 4		Champions League; Last 16		Jure Zdovc; Sotiris Manolopoulos	Dimitrios Moraitis, Roko Ukić, Nikola Ivanović, Michael Dixon, Giannoulis Larentzakis, Dionysis Skoulidas, Kostas Vasileiadis, Georgios Tsalmpouris, Edin Atić, Nikos Kamarianos, Dušan Šakota, Jawad Williams, Milan Milošević, Josh Owens, Dimitrios Mavroeidis, Randal Falker, Loukas Mavrokefalidis, Donnie McGrath, Brad Newley, Chinemelu Elonu
2017–18	5th place	Winner		Champions League; Winner		Sotiris Manolopoulos; Dragan Šakota	Kevin Punter, Delroy James, Mike Green, Manny Harris, Giannoulis Larentzakis, Vassilis Xanthopoulos, Panagiotis Vasilopoulos, Kelsey Barlow, Edin Atić, Dušan Šakota, Ioannis Agravanis, Dimitrios Moraitis, Michalis Kamperidis, Dimitrios Mavroeidis, Vassilis Kavvadas, Vince Hunter, Chinemelu Elonu
2018–19	3rd place	Last 8		Champions League; Last 8	Intercontinental Cup; Winner	Luca Banchi	Dimitrios Moraitis, Giannoulis Larentzakis, Georgios Tsalmpouris, Dušan Šakota, Delroy James, Vassilis Xanthopoulos, Jonas Mačiulis, Malcolm Griffin, Vassilis Kavvadas, Jordan Theodore, Howard Sant-Roos, Nikos Rogkavopoulos, Charis Giannopoulos, Vince Hunter
2019–20	(2nd place covid) the winner was votted	Winner		Champions League; Finalist		Ilias Papatheodorou	Marcus Slaughter, Vassilis Toliopoulos, Mario Chalmers, Nikos Gkikas, Jonas Mačiulis, Dimitris Kaklamanakis, Keith Langford, Howard Sant-Roos, Nikos Rogkavopoulos, Charis Giannopoulos, Kendrick Ray, Linos Chrysikopoulos, Dimitrios Mavroeidis, Stefan Janković, Vlado Janković
2020–21	3rd place	Last 8	4th place	Champions League; Playoffs		Ilias Papatheodorou; Vangelis Angelou	Marcus Slaughter, Vassilis Toliopoulos, Costis Gontikas, Nikos Gkikas, Jonas Mačiulis, Dimitrios Katsivelis, Keith Langford, Moses Kingsley, Nikos Rogkavopoulos, Dimitrios Moraitis, Yanick Moreira, Linos Chrysikopoulos, Dimitrios Mavroeidis, Daryl Macon, Vlado Janković
2021–22	6th place	Last 4	3rd place	Champions League; Group Stage		Stefanos Dedas; Curro Segura	Quino Colom, Dimitris Flionis, Andy Rautins, Andreas Petropoulos, Braian Angola, Panagiotis Filippakos, Keith Langford, Nikos Pappas, Eric Griffin, Michalis Karlis, Dimitrios Mavroeidis, Ioannis Kouzeloglou, Ian Hummer, Antonis Koniaris, Kostas Saxionis, Emmanouil Karlis, Odysseas Mouzourakis, Sotiris Gogolos
2022–23	6th place	Last 4		Champions League; Last 8		Ilias Kantzouris	Antonis Koniaris, Dimitris Flionis, Andreas Petropoulos, Vassilis Xanthopoulos, Pierre Oriola, Panagiotis Filippakos, Vlado Janković, Isaiah Miles, Eric Griffin, Nikos Pappas, Ioannis Kouzeloglou, Nikos Persidis, Tim Frazier, Cameron McGriff, Dimitrios Mavroeidis, Costis Gontikas, Alexander Madsen, Kostas Papadakis, Kenny Williams, Akil Mitchell, Jānis Strēlnieks, Sotiris Gogolos, Brynton Lemar, Moisis Mitrelos
2023–24	7th place	Last 16		Champions League; Last 16		Joan Plaza	Dimitris Flionis, Justin Tillman, Langston Hall, Chasson Randle, Zois Karampelas, Alfredos Pilavios, Omiros Netzipoglou, Manos Chatzidakis, Mindaugas Kuzminskas, Ben McLemore, Ioannis Kouzeloglou, Mfiondu Kabengele, Thomas Kottas, Jordan McRae, Jordan Morgan, Moisis Mitrelos, Manolis Mataliotakis, Ricky Ledo, Brandon Knight, Dimitrios Agravanis
2024–25	3rd place	Last 8		Champions League; 3rd		Dragan Šakota	Dimitris Flionis, RaiQuan Gray, Gaios Skordilis, Prentiss Hubb, Zois Karampelas, C. J. Bryce, Grant Golden, Rayjon Tucker, Mindaugas Kuzminskas, Joshua Obiesie, Ioannis Kouzeloglou, Nikos Arsenopoulos, Hunter Hale, Omiros Netzipoglou
2025–26	4th place	Last 8		Champions League; Finalist		Dragan Šakota	Dimitris Flionis, RaiQuan Gray, Gaios Skordilis, Vassilis Charalampopoulos, Frank Bartley, James Nunnally, Marko Pecarski, Lukas Lekavičius, Mindaugas Kuzminskas, KeyShawn Feazell, Dimitrios Katsivelis, Nikos Arsenopoulos, Greg Brown III, Omiros Netzipoglou, Charis Bilionis, Vassilis Ioannou

=== Greek Basket League participation ===
AEK was one of three Greek teams that had always competed in the first tier Greek competition until it first experienced relegation following the 2010–11 season, and thus did not play in the top-tier in the 2011–12 season. The following table illustrates the performance of AEK in the national divisions over the years.

Pos.	64	65	66	67	68	69	70	71	72	73	74	75	76	77	78	79	80	81	82	83	84	85	86	87	88	89	90	91	92	93	94	95	96	97	98	99	00	01	02	03	04	05	06	07	08	09	10	11	12	13	14	15	16	17	18	19	20	21	22	23	24	25
1	1	1	1		1		1																																1																							
2				2		2		2			2																							2						2		2															2					
3										3		3																																									3	3		3		3				3
4									4				4			4		4		4					4				4						4		4	4			4																					
5																	5		5		5							5								5																5			5							
6														6								6					6			6																													6	6		
7															7									7																			7		7																7	
8																										8					8	8																														
9																							9																					9		9																
10																																	10														10															
11																																																														
12																																																														
13																																																13														
14																																																														
A2																																																	2		1											
Β																																																		3												

== Player records ==
=== Club top scorers and most appearances ===
No.	Player	Nationality	Position	Playing career	Coaching career
6	Georgios Trontzos	(Greece)	C	1963–80	1979–80
10	Georgios Amerikanos	(Greece)	SG	1959–75	1986–87
9	Minas Gekos	(Greece)	PG	1976–91; 1994–95	2009–01/2011
8	Christos Zoupas	(Greece)	PG	1962–74	–
9	Nikos Chatzis	(Greece)	SG	1995–05; 2007–09	2017–present

=== Retired jerseys ===
No.	Player	Nationality	Position	Playing career	Coaching career
6	Georgios Trontzos	(Greece)	C	1963–80	1979–80
10	Georgios Amerikanos	(Greece)	SG	1959–75	1986–87
13	Stevan Jelovac	(Serbia)	PF	2021

=== One-club men ===
Player	Nationality	Debut	Last Game
Vangelis Dermanoutsos	(Greece)	1955	1967
Nikos Nesiadis	(Greece)	1964	1976
Thanasis Skourtopoulos	(Greece)	1982	1991

== Personnel ==
=== Ownership and current board ===
Position	Staff
Owner	(Greece) Makis Angelopoulos
President & CEO	(Greece) Evangelos Angelopoulos
Vice President	(Greece) Eduardos Karrer

Source: AEK B.C.

=== Executives ===
Position	Staff
General manager	(Greece) Kostas Kotsis
Venue Consultant	(Greece) Savvas Anestiadis
Venue technical consultant	(Greece) Ioannis Lampropoulos
Sponsoring Marketing Manager	(Greece) Christos Liarakos
Press Officer	(Greece) George Nikolaou
Social Media Manager	(Greece) Christos Papadopoulos
Marketing Manager	(Greece) Pantelis Nikolaidis
Head Operations	(Greece) Panagiotis Mantzos
Security Manager	(Greece) Evangelos Christakopoulos

Source: AEK B.C.

=== Coaching and medical staff ===
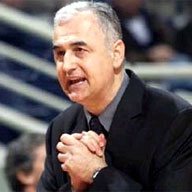
Dragan Šakota, the current head coach of AEK B.C.

Coaching staff

Position	Staff
Head coach	(Serbia) Dragan Šakota
Assistant coaches	(Serbia) Stevan Mijović (Serbia) Miloš Šakota (Greece) Marinos Konstantis
Fitness coach	(Serbia) Μilijan Nikolić
Team Manager	(Greece) Ilias Kekos
Assistant Team Manager	(Greece) Akis Kallinikidis
Equipment Manager	(Greece) George Stathopoulos

Source: AEK B.C.

Medical staff

Position	Staff
Medical Director	(Greece) Fragiskos Xipnitos
Doctor	(Greece) Thomas Krithimos
Head of Physiotherapy	(Greece) Stavros Toilos
Physiotherapists	(Greece) Giannis Chotzalis (Greece) Alexandros Iraklis
Chiropractor	(Greece) Kostas Psarogiorgos

Source: AEK B.C.

== List of former players ==
Note: Flags indicate national team eligibility at FIBA-sanctioned events. Players may hold other non-FIBA nationalities not displayed.

Criteria

To appear in this section a player must have either:

- Set a club record or won an individual award while at the club
- Played at least one official international match for their national team at any time
- Played at least one official NBA match at any time.

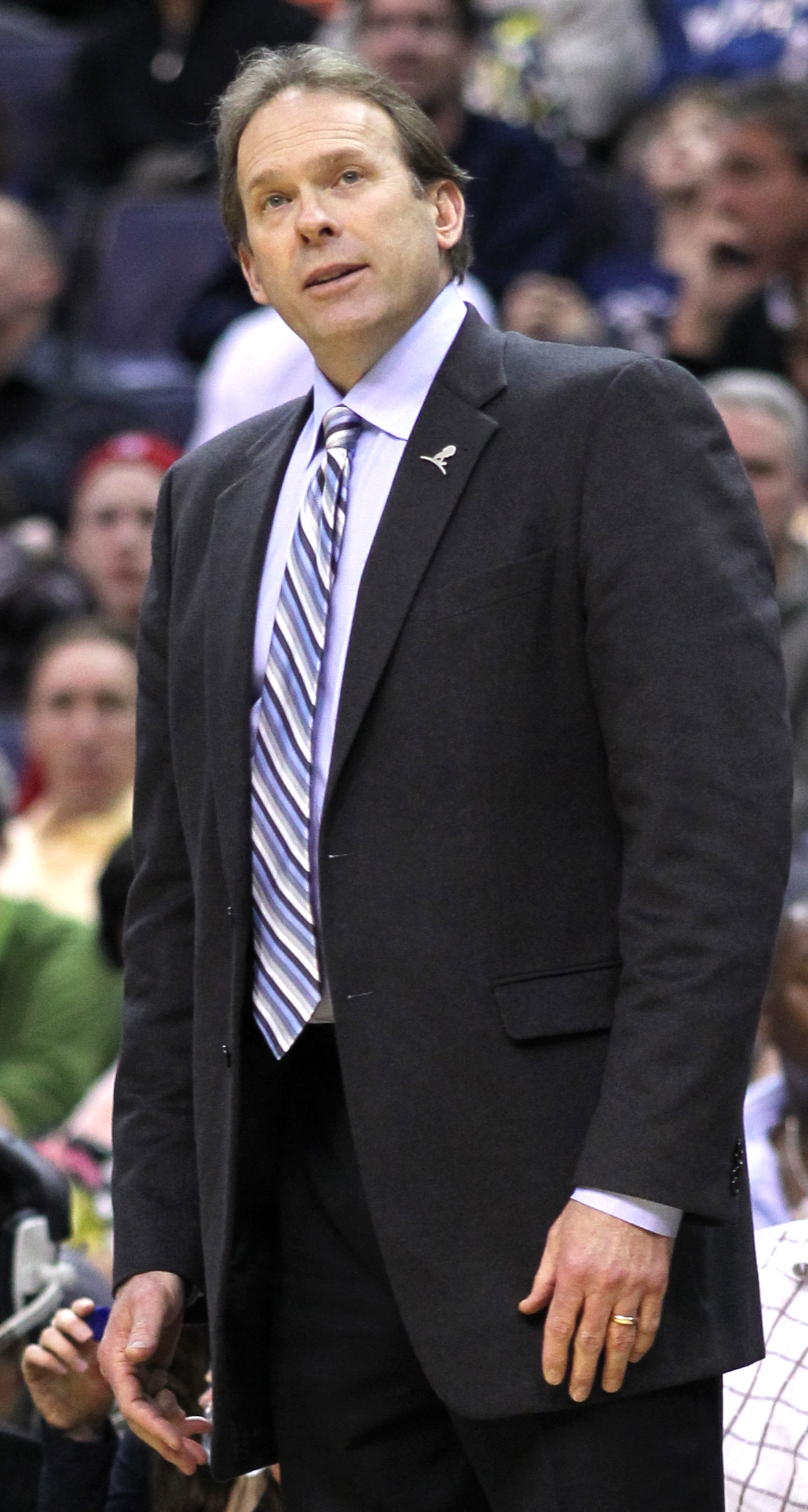
Kurt Rambis

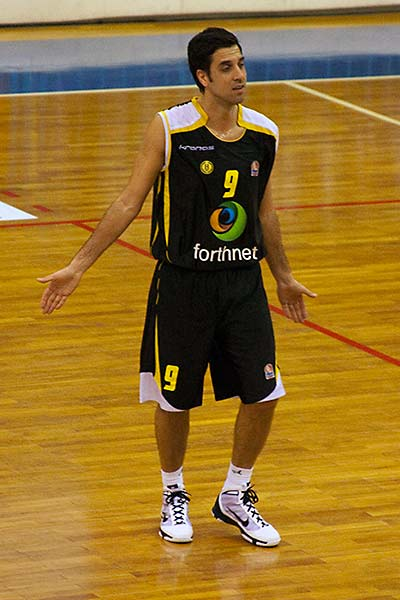
Nikos Chatzis

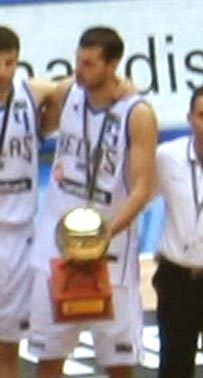
Michalis Kakiouzis

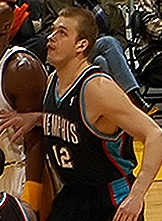
Jake Tsakalidis

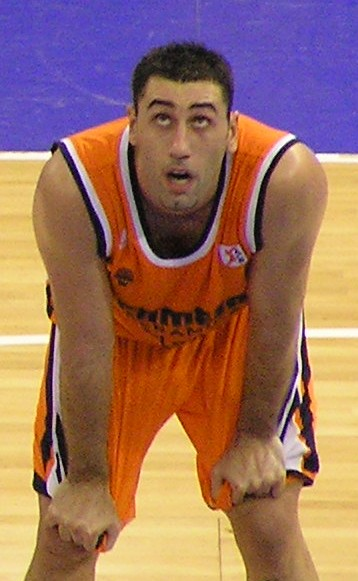
Dimos Dikoudis

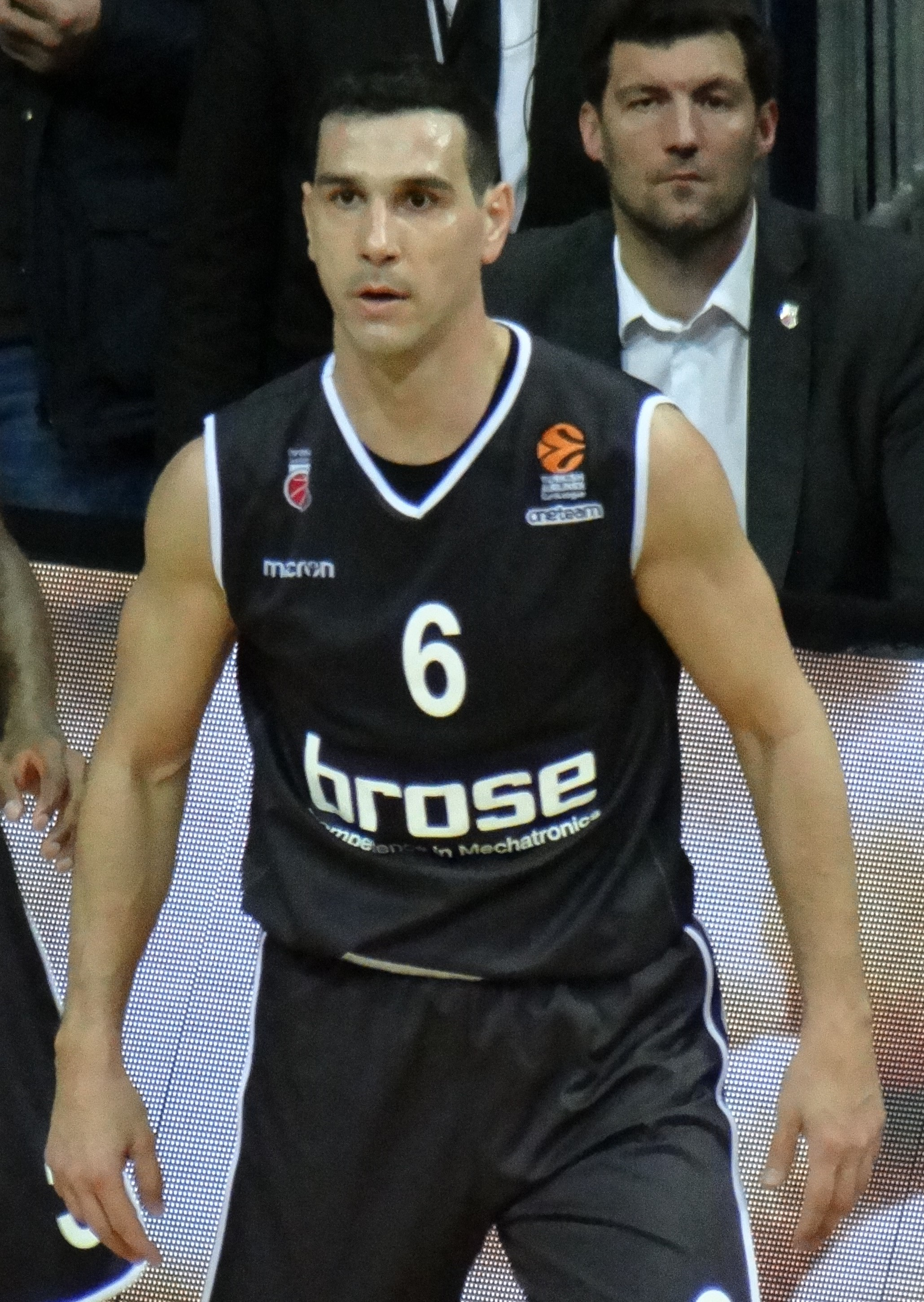
Nikos Zisis

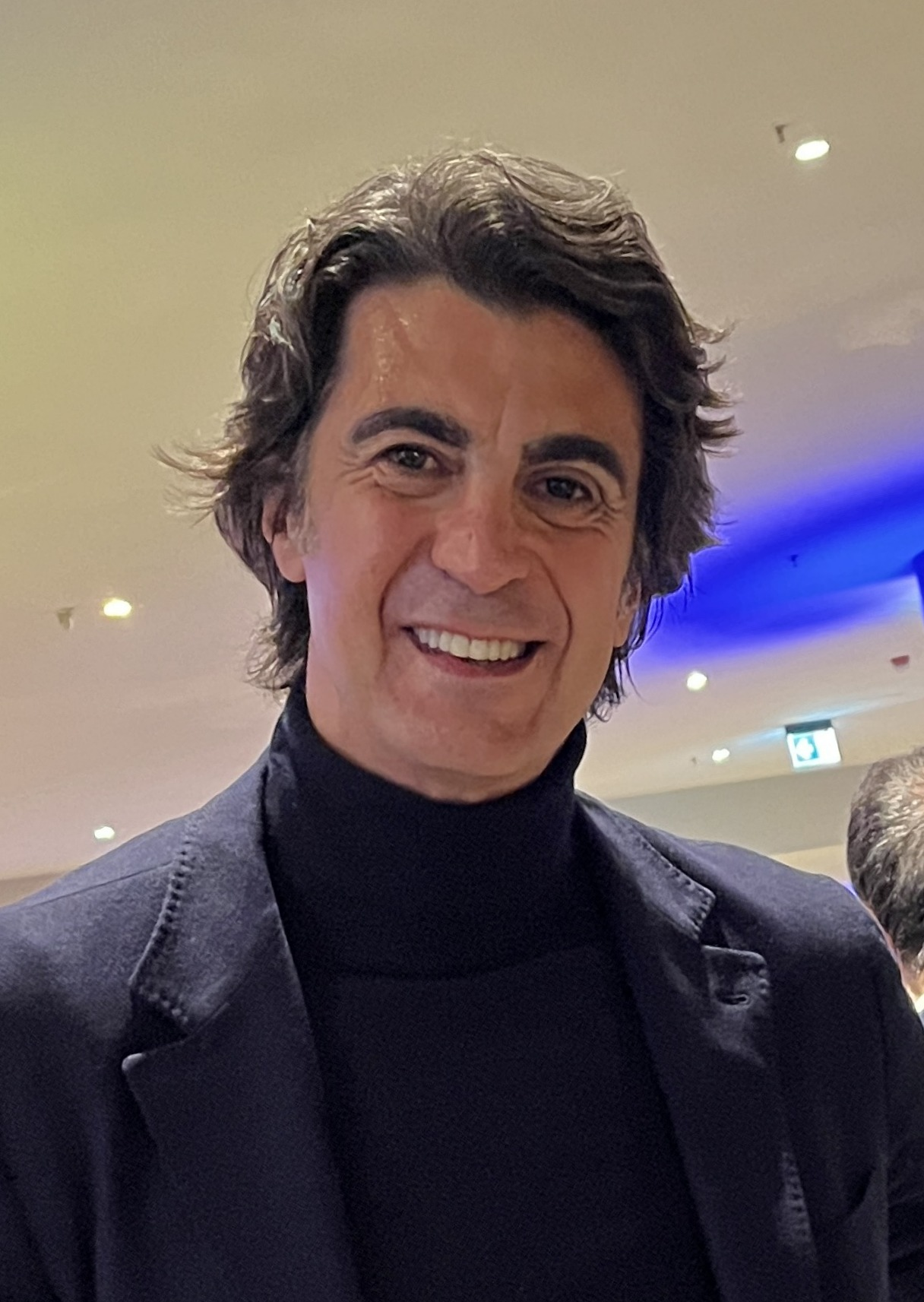
İbrahim Kutluay

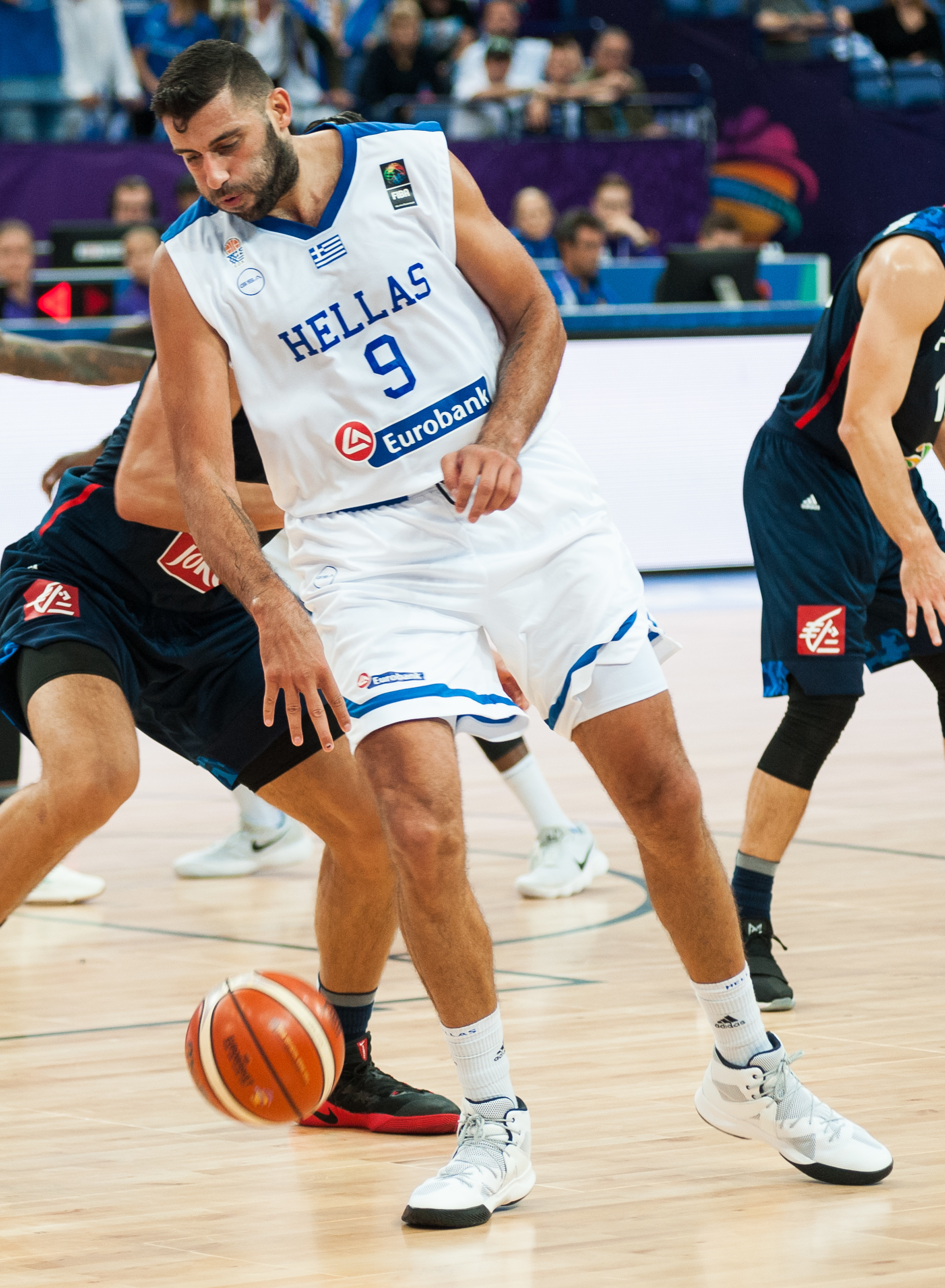
Ioannis Bourousis

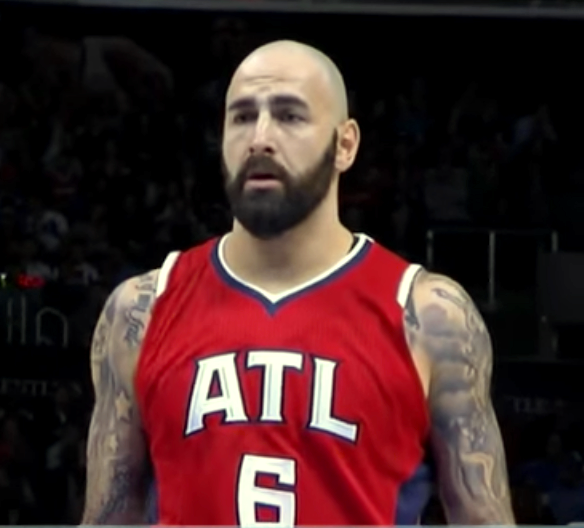
Pero Antić

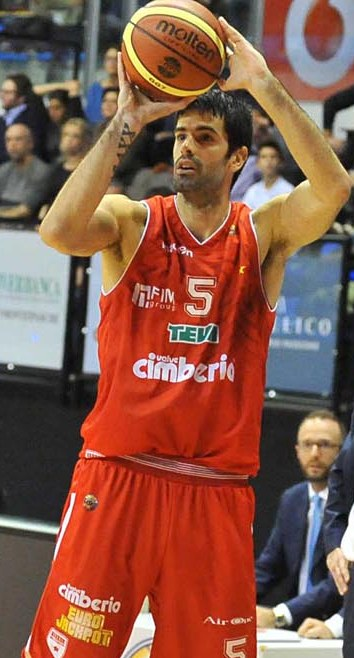
Dušan Šakota

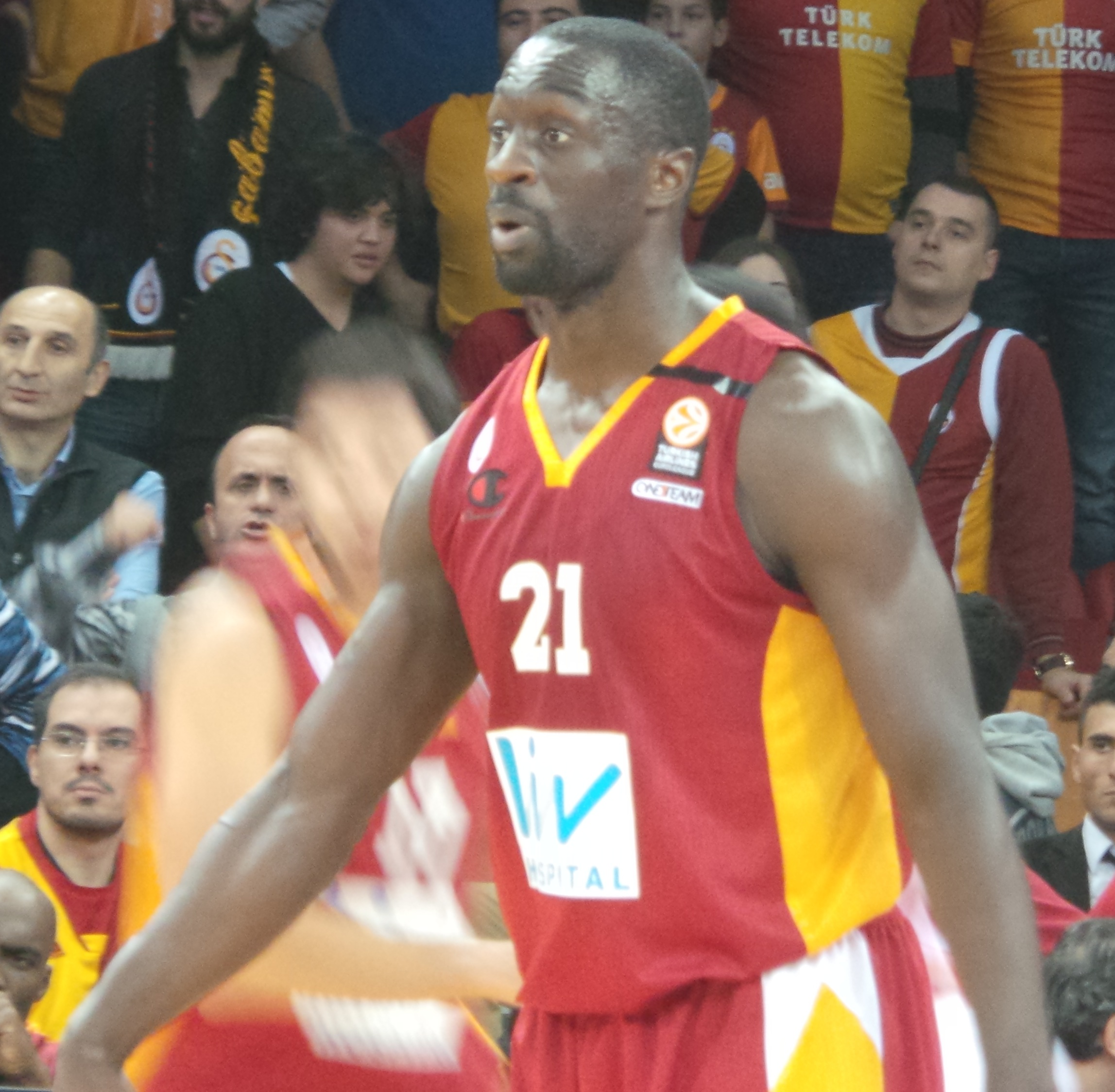
Pops Mensah-Bonsu

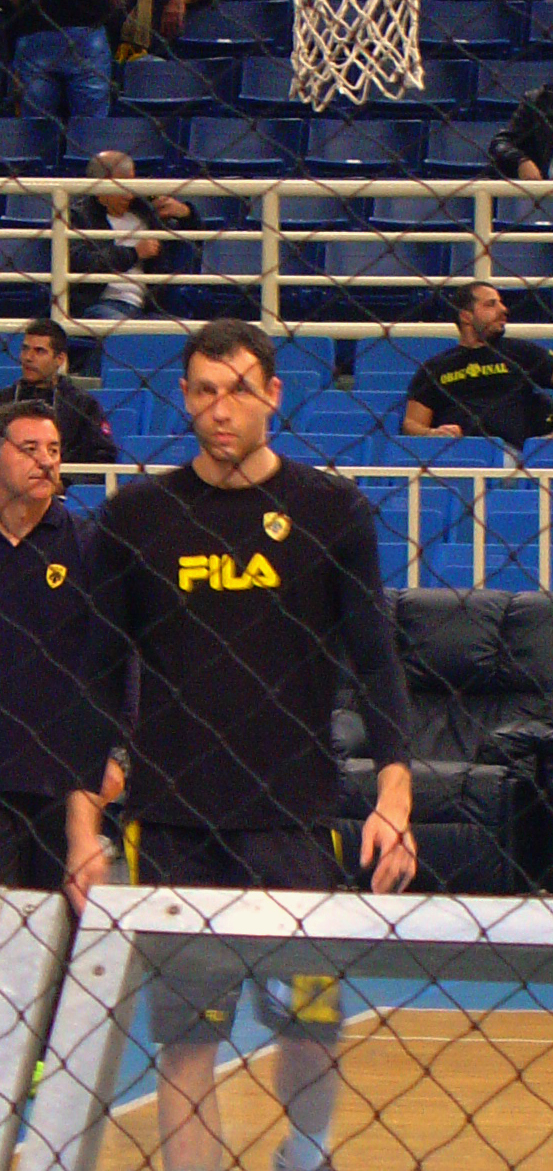
Loukas Mavrokefalidis

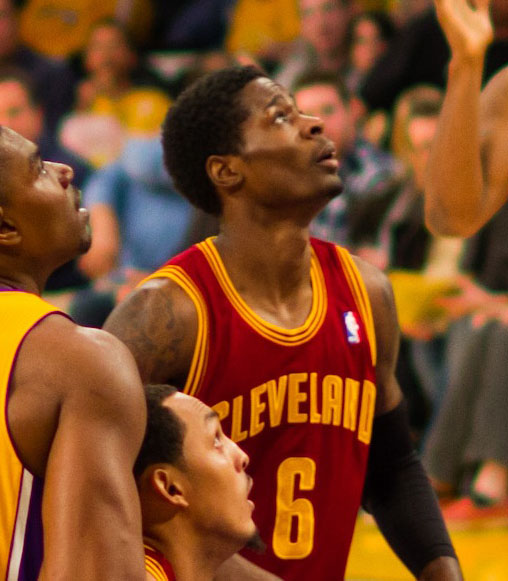
Manny Harris

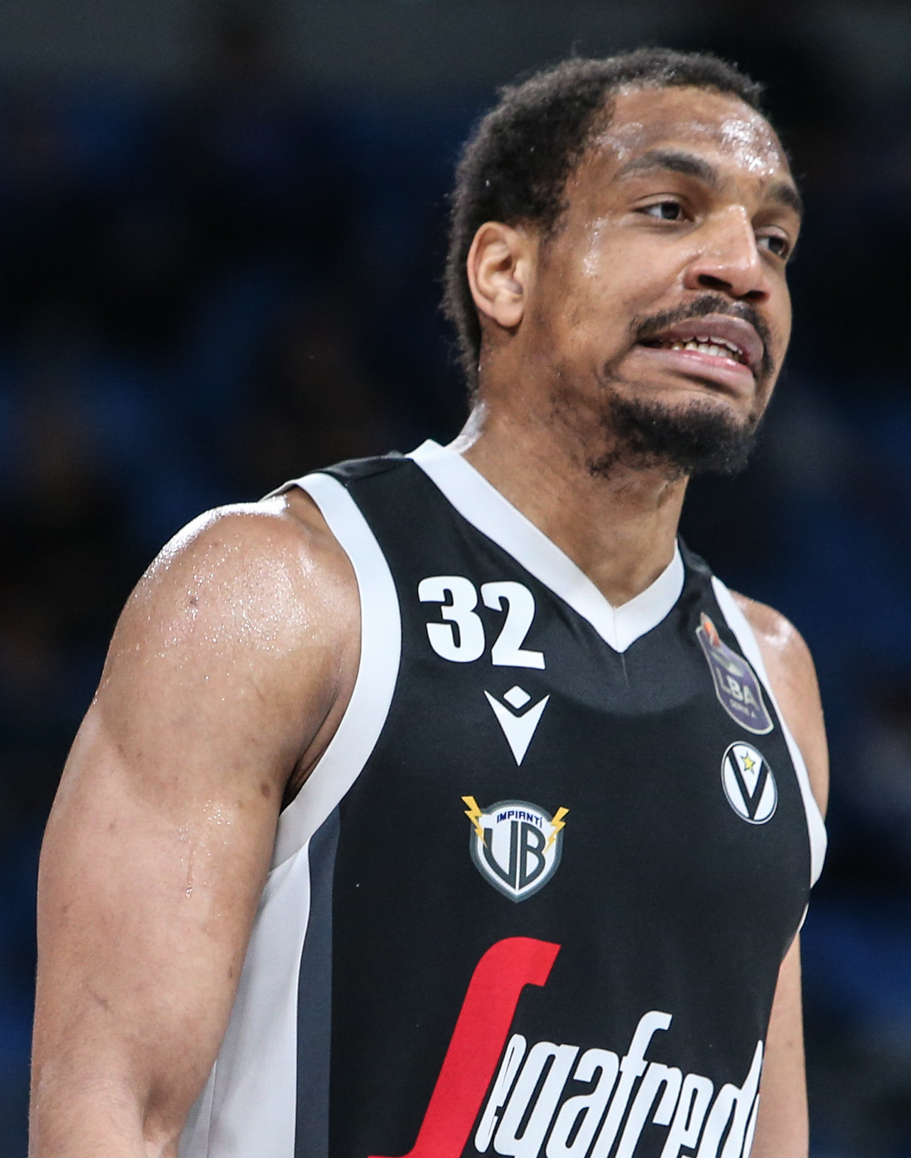
Vince Hunter

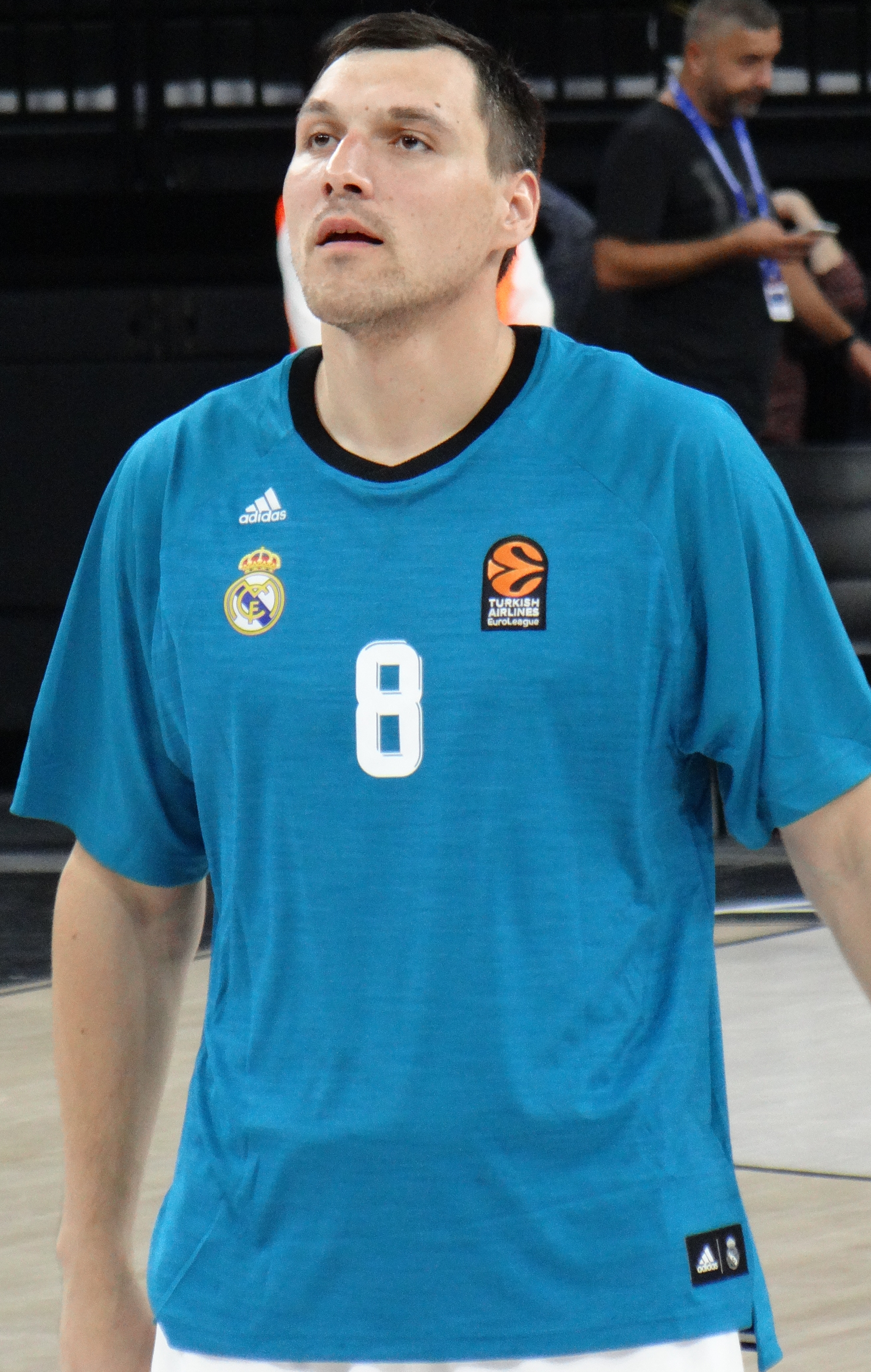
Jonas Mačiulis

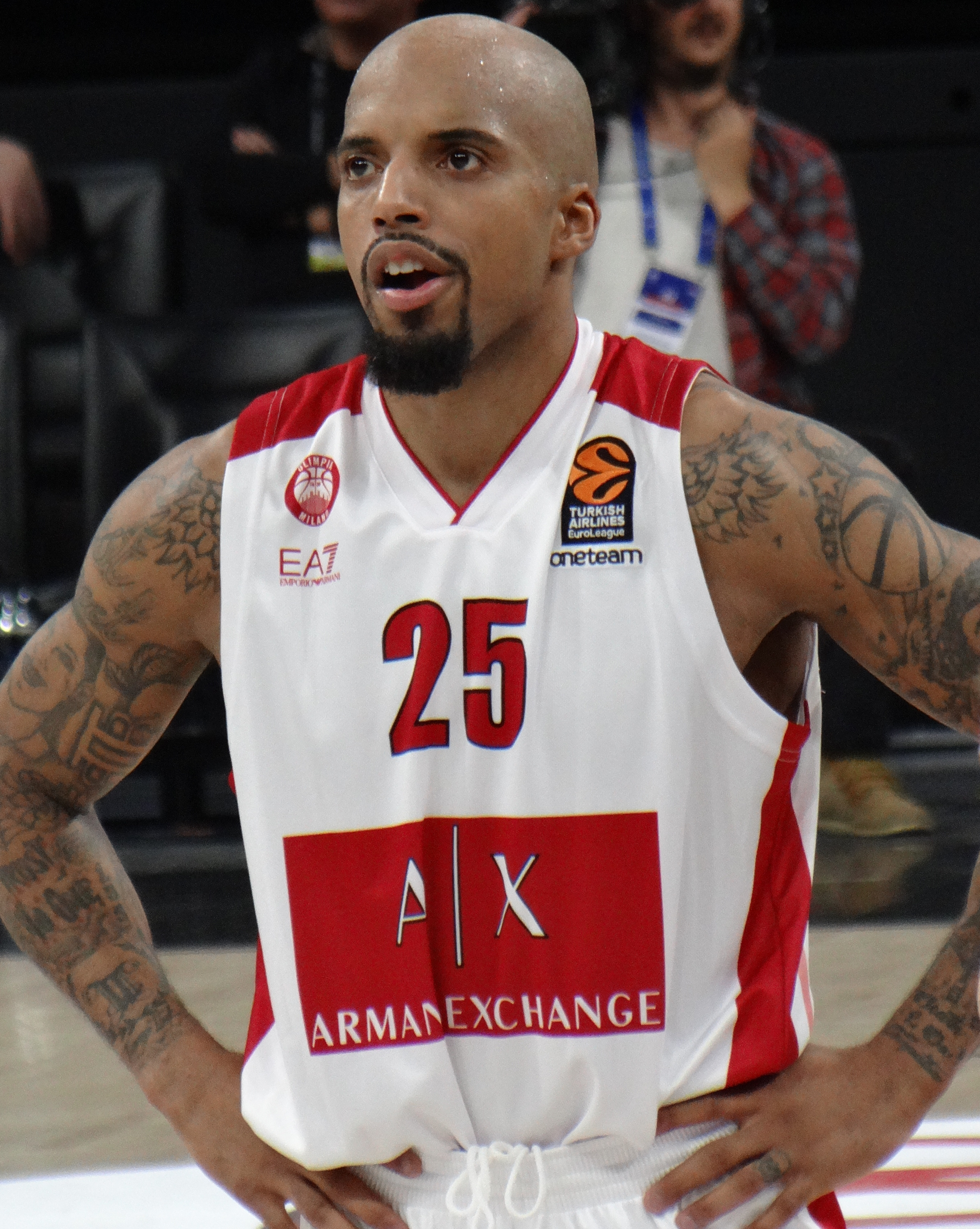
Jordan Theodore

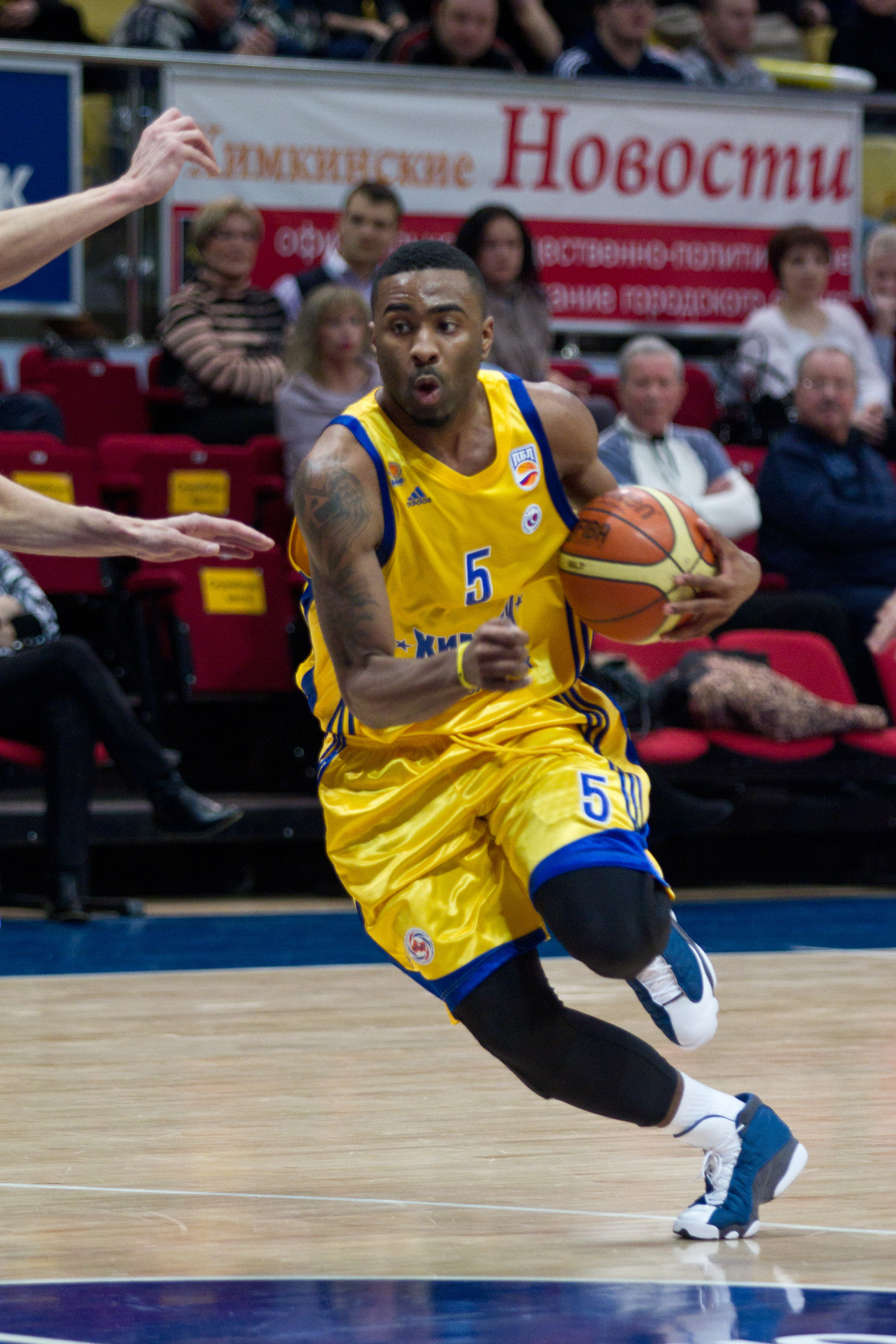
Keith Langford

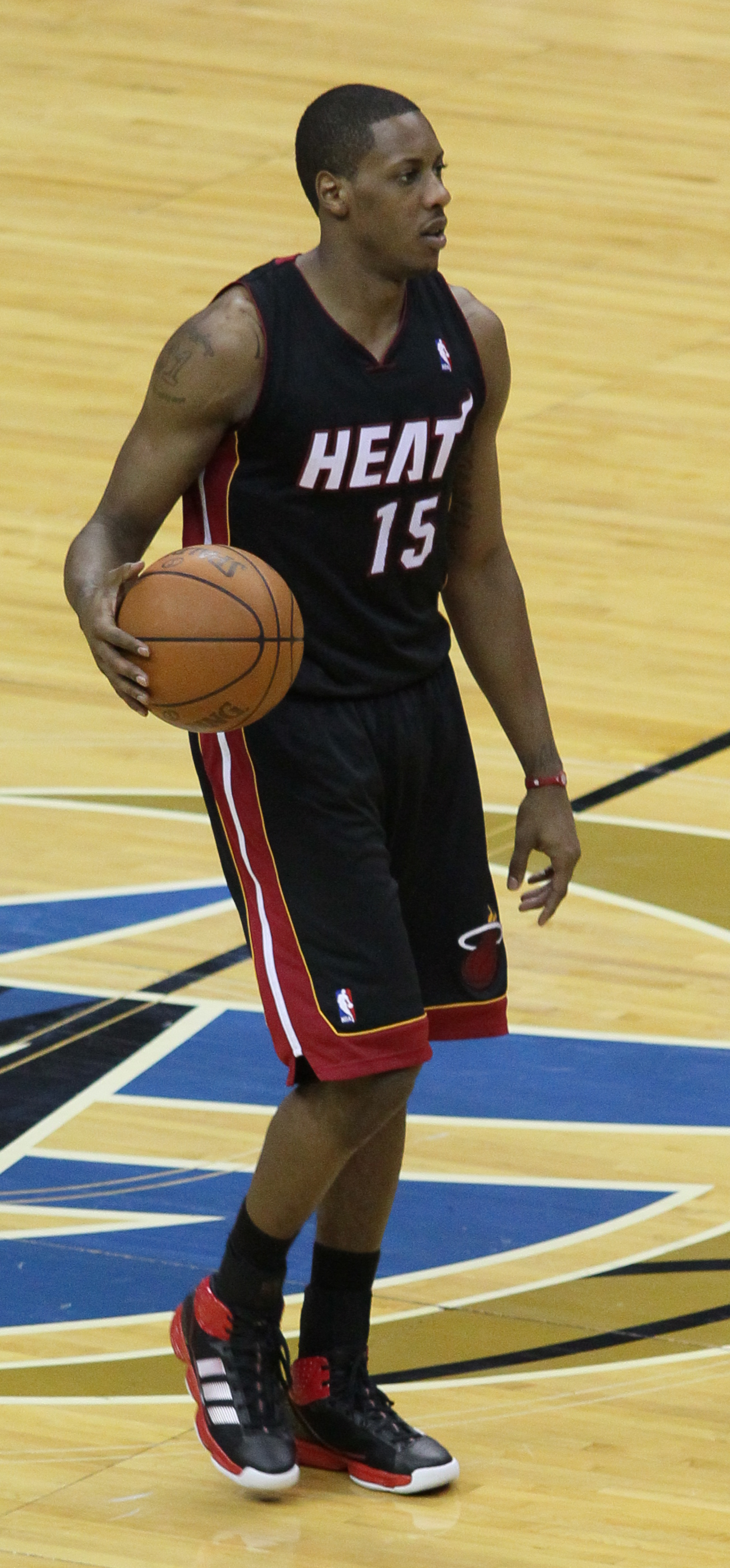
Mario Chalmers

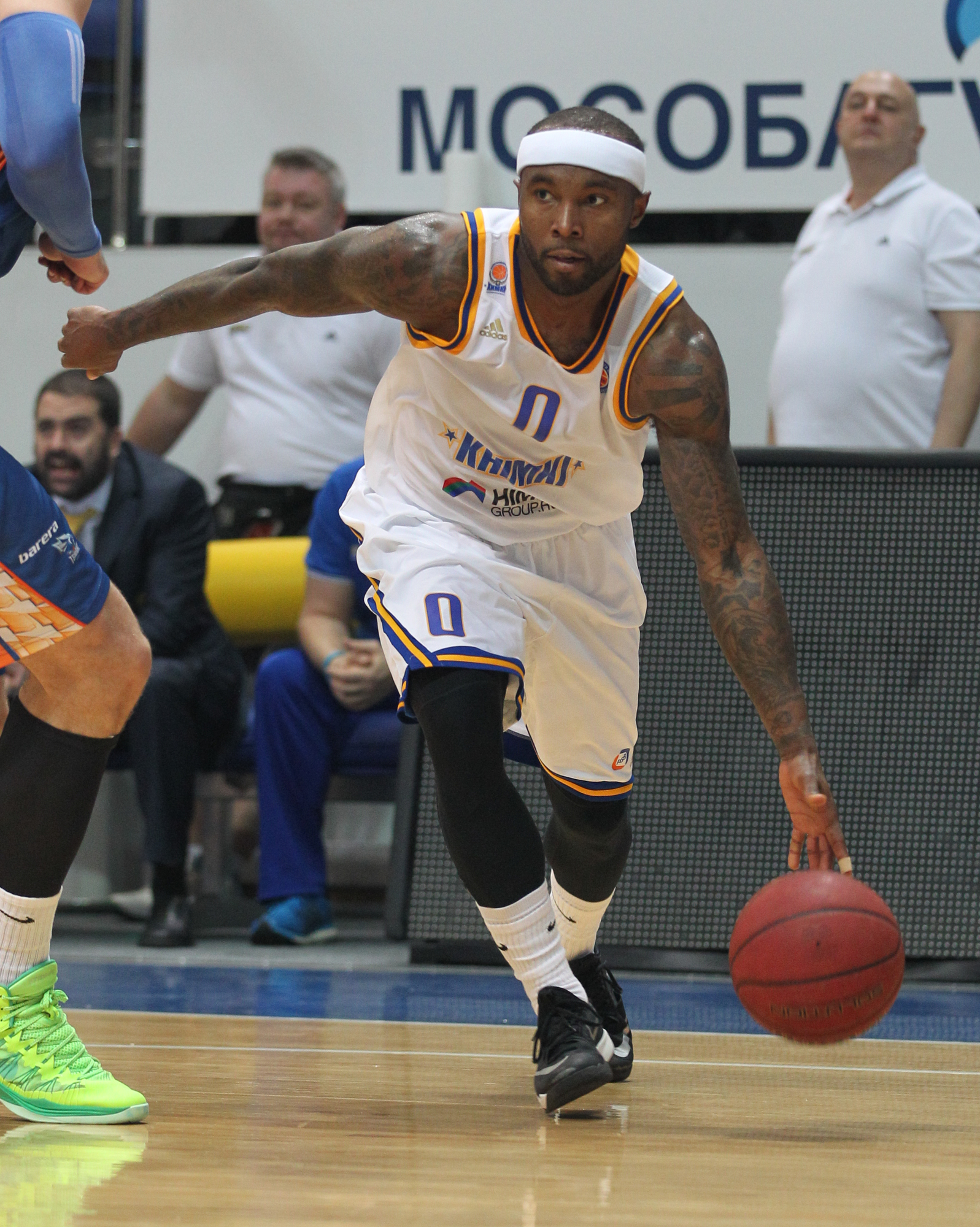
Tyrese Rice

Greece

- (Greece) Konstantinos Karamanlis (1951–59)
- (Greece) Vangelis Dermanoutsos (1955–67)
- (Greece) Georgios Amerikanos (1959–75)
- (Greece) Georgios Moschos (1961–66)
- (Greece) Lakis Tsavas (1962–69)
- (Greece) Antonis Christeas (1962–70)
- (Greece) Eas Larentzakis (1962–72)
- (Greece) Christos Zoupas (1962–74)
- (Greece) Stelios Vasileiadis (1962–75)
- (Greece) Georgios Trontzos (1963–80)
- (Greece) Nikos Nesiadis (1964–76)
- (Greece) Michalis Giannouzakos (1974–81)
- (Greece) Minas Gekos (1976–91, 1994–95)
- (Greece) Vangelis Fotsis (1977–88)
- (Greece) Pavlos Stamelos (1979–81)
- (Greece) Vassilis Goumas (1979–85)
- (Greece) Thanasis Skourtopoulos (1982–91)
- (Greece) Apostolos Kontos (1983–87)
- (Greece) Kostas Patavoukas (1985–93)
- (Greece) Nasos Galakteros (1989–93)
- (Greece) Dimitris Papadopoulos (1995–99)
- (Greece) Michalis Kakiouzis (1995–02)
- (Greece) Nikos Chatzis (1995–05, 2007–09)
- (Greece) Makis Nikolaidis (1996–99, 2006–07, 2009–11)
- (Greece) - (Georgia (country)) Jake Tsakalidis (1996–00)
- (Greece) Angelos Koronios (1998–00)
- (Greece) Dimos Dikoudis (1998–03, 2010–11)
- (Greece) Vassilis Kikilias (2000–03)
- (Greece) Nikos Zisis (2000–05, 2020–21)
- (Greece) Christos Tapoutos (2001–04, 2006–09)
- (Greece) Ioannis Bourousis (2001–06)
- (Greece) Andreas Glyniadakis (2003–05, 2007)
- (Greece) Michalis Pelekanos (2004–06)
- (Greece) Giannis Kalampokis (2005–06, 2015–16)
- (Greece) Nestoras Kommatos (2006–07)
- (Greece) Dimitris Papanikolaou (2007–09)
- (Greece) Akis Kallinikidis (2009–11)
- (Greece) Michalis Polytarchou (2012–15)
- (Greece) Leonidas Kaselakis (2014–15)
- (Greece) Ioannis Athinaiou (2014–15)
- (Greece) Loukas Mavrokefalidis (2015–16, 2017)
- (Greece) Dimitrios Katsivelis (2015–16, 2020–21)
- (Greece) Dimitrios Mavroeidis (2015–18, 2019–23)
- (Greece) Kostas Vasileiadis (2016–17)
- (Greece) Giannoulis Larentzakis (2016–19)
- (Greece) Manos Chatzidakis (2016–19, 2023–24)
- (Greece) Vassilis Kavvadas (2017–19)
- (Greece) Vassilis Xanthopoulos (2017–19)
- (Greece) Nikos Rogkavopoulos (2017–21)
- (Greece) Panagiotis Vasilopoulos (2018)
- (Greece) Charis Giannopoulos (2018–20)
- (Greece) Nikos Gkikas (2019–21)
- (Greece) Georgios Bogris (2021–22)
- (Greece) Nikos Pappas (2021–22)
- (Greece) Antonis Koniaris (2021–23)

Rest of Europe

- (Belgium) - (United States) Matt Lojeski (2020–21)
- (Bosnia and Herzegovina) Milan Milošević (2014–17)
- (Bosnia and Herzegovina) Edin Atić (2015–19)
- (Croatia) Arijan Komazec (2001)
- (Croatia) Davor Kus (2004–05)
- (Croatia) Sandro Nicević (2004–05)
- (Croatia) Slaven Rimac (2005–06)
- (Croatia) Roko Ukić (2016–17)
- (Denmark) Michael Andersen (1997–99, 2008–09)
- (Estonia) Martin Müürsepp (1999–01)
- (Finland) Alexander Madsen (2022–23)
- (France) Jim Bilba (2001–02)
- (United Kingdom) Andrew Betts (2000–03)
- (United Kingdom) Pops Mensah-Bonsu (2014–15)
- (Italy) Roberto Chiacig (1996–97)
- (Italy) Claudio Coldebella (1996–98)
- (Latvia) Jānis Strēlnieks (2022–23)
- (Lithuania) Tomas Delininkaitis (2014–15)
- (Lithuania) Jonas Mačiulis (2018–21)
- (Lithuania) Mindaugas Kuzminskas (2023–)
- (Montenegro) Blagota Sekulić (2003–04)
- (Montenegro) Nikola Ivanović (2016–17)
- (Netherlands) Geert Hammink (2000–01)
- (North Macedonia) Vrbica Stefanov (2000–01)
- (North Macedonia) Pero Antić (2001–05)
- (Serbia) Miloš Babić (1992–93)
- (Serbia) Rastko Cvetković (1993–94)
- (Serbia) - (Greece) Bane Prelević (1997–99)
- (Serbia) - (Greece) Milan Gurović (2000)
- (Serbia) - (Greece) Dušan Šakota (2014–19)
- (Spain) Quino Colom (2021–22)

Africa

- (Angola) Yanick Moreira (2020–21)

Americas

- (Canada) Carl English (2014–15)
- (Canada) Philip Scrubb (2015)
- (Canada) Xavier Rathan-Mayes (2018)
- (Canada) Andy Rautins (2022)
- (Canada) Mfiondu Kabengele (2023)
- (Colombia) Braian Angola (2021–22)
- (Cuba) Howard Sant-Roos (2018–20)
- (Panama) Akil Mitchell (2022–23)
- (Puerto Rico) Ramón Rivas (1997–98)
- (United States) - (Greece) Kurt Rambis (Kyriakos Rambidis) (1980–81)
- (United States) Dean Tolson (1983)
- (United States) Clint Richardson (1988–89)
- (United States) Danny Vranes (1988–89)
- (United States) Richard Rellford (1990)
- (United States) Thomas Jordan (1990–92)
- (United States) Carlton McKinney (1992)
- (United States) Jack Haley (1993)
- (United States) Kannard Johnson (1993)
- (United States) Tony White (1993–94)
- (United States) - (Panama) Rolando Blackman (1994–95)
- (United States) Tony Campbell (1995)
- (United States) Marcus Liberty (1995–96)
- (United States) Bill Edwards (1996–97)
- (United States) Ricky Pierce (1997)
- (United States) Victor Alexander (1997–98)
- (United States) Willie Anderson (1997–98)
- (United States) Terence Stansbury (1997–98)
- (United States) Ruben Patterson (1998)
- (United States) Joe Arlauckas (1998–99)
- (United States) Lloyd Daniels (1998–99)
- (United States) Anthony Bowie (1999–00)
- (United States) Dan O'Sullivan (1999–00)
- (United States) Chris Carr (2001–02)
- (United States) - (Russia) J. R. Holden (2001–02)
- (United States) - (Bulgaria) Roderick Blakney (2002–03)
- (United States) Joe Crispin (2003)
- (United States) Horace Jenkins (2003–04)
- (United States) Toby Bailey (2004–05)
- (United States) Lionel Chalmers (2005–06)
- (United States) Brent Scott (2006–07)
- (United States) William Avery (2007–08)
- (United States) K'zell Wesson (2007–08)
- (United States) - (Iceland) Darrel Lewis (2008)
- (United States) - (Georgia (country)) Taurean Green (2009–10, 2016)
- (United States) - (Republic of Ireland) Donnie McGrath (2009–10, 2017)
- (United States) Anthony Grundy (2010–11)
- (United States) - (Turkey) Scottie Wilbekin (2015)
- (United States) - (Romania) - (Kosovo) Malcolm Armstead (2015)
- (United States) Malik Hairston (2015–16)
- (United States) Dionte Christmas (2016)
- (United States) Jawad Williams (2016–17)
- (United States) - (Georgia (country)) Michael Dixon (2016–17)
- (United States) Mike Green (2017–18)
- (United States) Manny Harris (2017–18, 2021)
- (United States) Vince Hunter (2018–19)
- (United States) - (North Macedonia) Jordan Theodore (2019)
- (United States) Mario Chalmers (2019–20)
- (United States) Kendrick Ray (2019–20)
- (United States) Marcus Slaughter (2019–21)
- (United States) Keith Langford (2019–21, 2022)
- (United States) - (Montenegro) Tyrese Rice (2020)
- (United States) Daryl Macon (2021)
- (United States) Erick Green (2021–22)
- (United States) Ian Hummer (2021–22)
- (United States) Ben McLemore (2023)
- (United States) Jordan McRae (2023–24)
- (United States) Chasson Randle (2023–24)
- (United States) Jordan Morgan (2023–24)
- (United States) Brandon Knight (2024)
- (United States) Ricky Ledo (2024)

Asia

- (Israel) Dror Hajaj (2005–06)
- (Turkey) İbrahim Kutluay (2000–01)

Oceania

- (Australia) Brad Newley (2017)

=== Club captains ===
AEK B.C. team captains, since the 1951–52 season:

Period	Captain
1951–1959	(Greece) Konstantinos Karamanlis
1959–1961	(Greece) Vangelis Sevdinoglou
1961–1964	(Greece) Nikos Babanikolos
1964–1975	(Greece) Georgios Amerikanos
1975–1980	(Greece) Georgios Trontzos
1980–1991	(Greece) Minas Gekos
1991–1993	(Greece) Kostas Patavoukas
1993–1994	(Greece) Alexis Giannopoulos
1994–1995	(Greece) Minas Gekos
1995–1997	(Greece) Dimitris Podaras
1997–1999	(Federal Republic of Yugoslavia) (Greece) Bane Prelević
1999–2005	(Greece) Nikos Chatzis
2005–2006	(Greece) Georgios Tsiaras
2006–2007	(Greece) (Cyprus) Makis Nikolaidis
2007–2009	(Greece) Nikos Chatzis
2009–2010	(Greece) Periklis Dorkofikis
2010–2011	(Greece) (Cyprus) Makis Nikolaidis
2011–2012	(Greece) Fotis Vasilopoulos
2012–2014	(Greece) Alexis Falekas
2014–2015	(Greece) Michalis Polytarchou
2015–2019	(Greece) (Serbia) Dušan Šakota
2019–2020	(Lithuania) Jonas Mačiulis
2020–2021	(Greece) Nikos Zisis
2021–2023	(Greece) Dimitrios Mavroeidis
2023–present	(Greece) Dimitris Flionis

== Head coaches ==
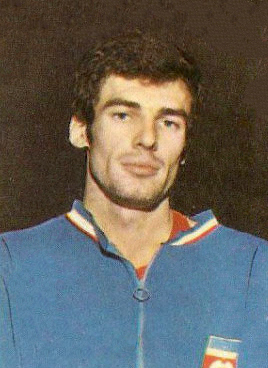
Krešimir Ćosić

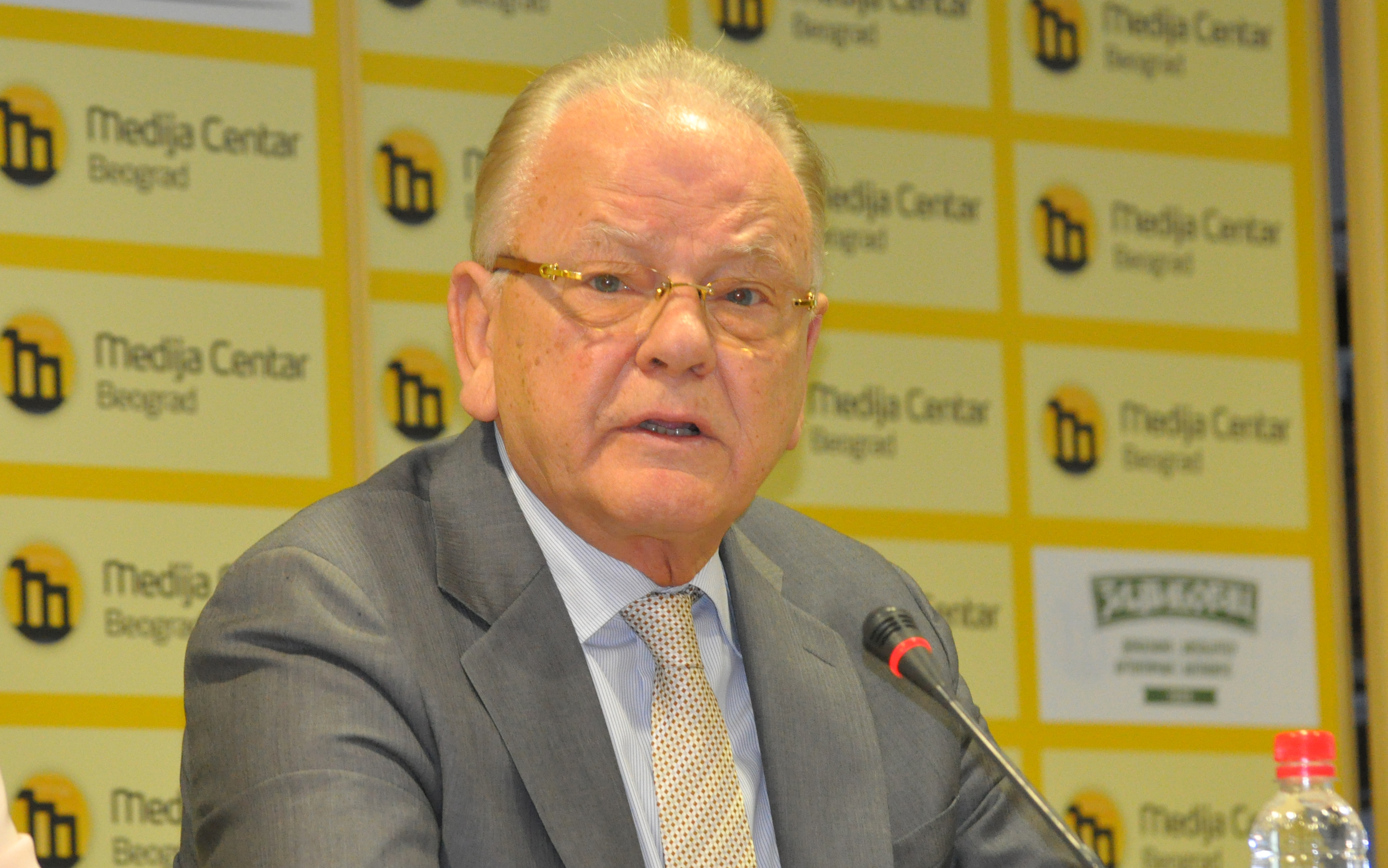
Dušan Ivković

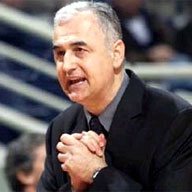
Dragan Šakota

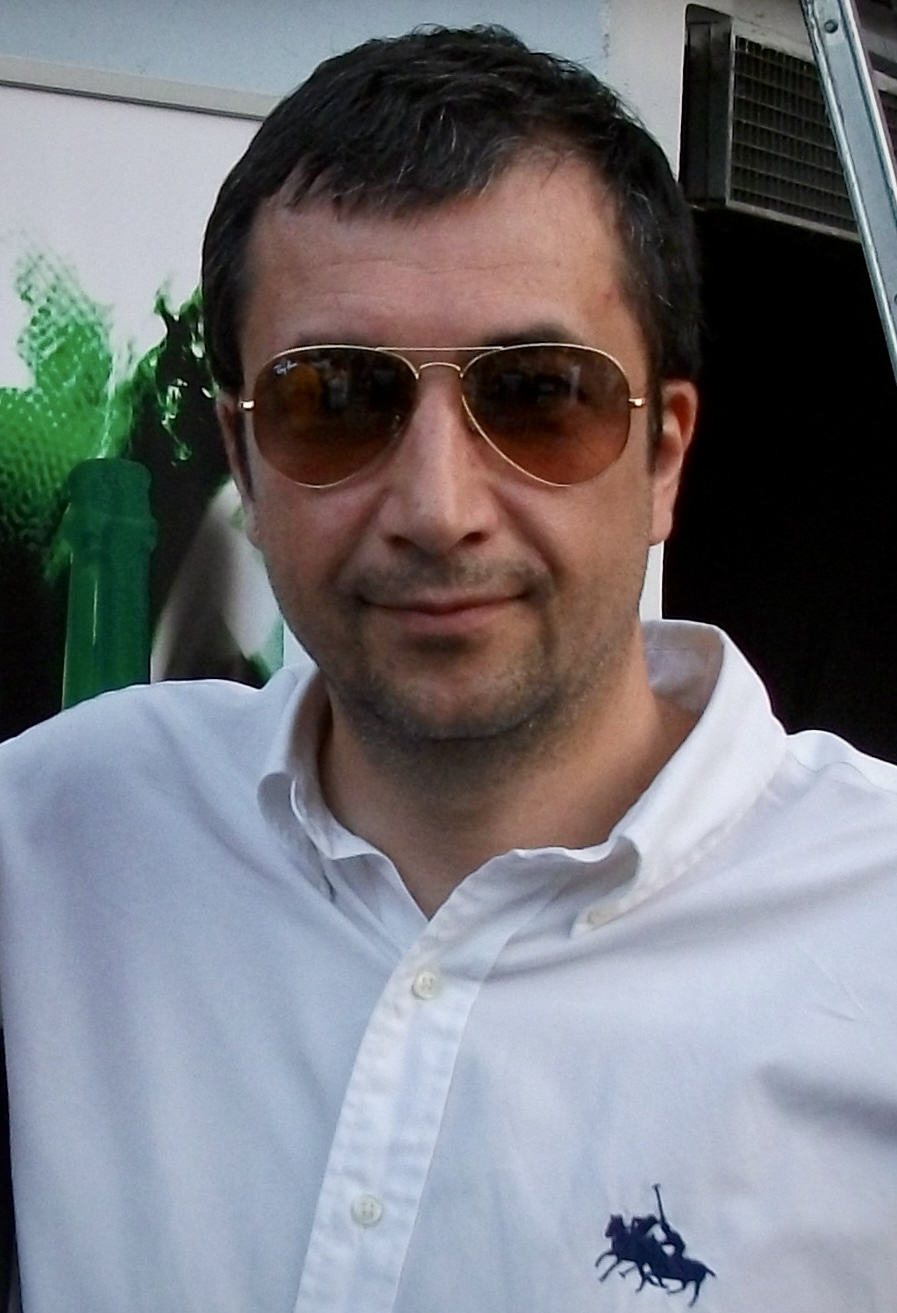
Luca Banchi

Head Coach	From	To	Titles & Honors
(Greece) Konstantinos Karamanlis	1957	1958	Greek League Champion (1958)
(Greece) Missas Pantazopoulos	1962	1966	EuroLeague Final Four (1966); 4× Greek League Champion (1963, 1964, 1965, 1966)
(Greece) Themis Cholevas	1965	1966	EuroLeague Final Four (1966); Greek League Champion (1966)
(Greece) Nikos Milas	1967	1974	FIBA European Cup Winners' Cup Champion (1968); 2× Greek League Champion (1968, 1970)
(Greece) Kostas Mourouzis	1974	1977	Greek Cup Finalist (1976)
(Greece) Georgios Amerikanos	1977; 1978	1986; 1987	Greek Cup Finalist (1978)
(Greece) Faidon Matthaiou	1977	1979	
(Greece) Georgios Trontzos	1979	1980	Greek Cup Finalist (1980)
(United States) Fred G. Develey	1980	1981	Greek Cup Winner (1981)
(Greece) Vangelis Nikitopoulos	1982; 1987; 1989; 1991	1986; 1988; 1990; 1992	2× Greek Cup Finalist (1988, 1992)
(Greece) Michalis Anastasiadis	1986	1987	
(Greece) Kostas Anastasatos	1987	1987	
(Socialist Federal Republic of Yugoslavia) Krešimir Ćosić	1988; 1990	1989; 1991	
(Greece) Nikos Nesiadis	1988; 1993; 1996	1989; 1993; 1996	
(United States) Richard Dukeshire	1993	1993	
(Greece) Michalis Kyritsis	1992	1993	
(Greece) - (United States) Steve Giatzoglou	1993	1994	
(Greece) Apostolos Kontos	1994	1994	
(Federal Republic of Yugoslavia) - (Greece) Vlade Đurović	1994; 1995	1995; 1996	
(Federal Republic of Yugoslavia) - (Greece) Slobodan Subotić	1996	1996	
(Greece) Giannis Ioannidis	1996	1998	EuroLeague Finalist (1998); Greek Cup Finalist (1998)
(Greece) Georgios Kalafatakis	1998	1999	
(Greece) Kostas Politis	1999	1999	Greek Cup Finalist (1999)
(Federal Republic of Yugoslavia) Dušan Ivković	1999	2001	EuroLeague Semi-finals (2001); FIBA Saporta Cup Champion (2000); 2× Greek Cup Winner (2000, 2001)
(Serbia and Montenegro) - (Serbia) - (Greece) Dragan Šakota	2001; 2014; 2017	2003; 2015; 2018	FIBA Champions League Champion (2018); Greek League Champion (2002); Greek Cup Winner (2018)
(Greece) Fotis Katsikaris	2003	2005	
(Greece) Costas Oikonomakis	2011	2011	
(Greece) Dimitris Liogas	2011	2012	
(Greece) Dimitris Papanikolaou	2012	2012	
(Greece) Nikos Karagiannis	2012	2012	
(Greece) Dimitris Papadopoulos	2012	2012	
(Greece) Vangelis Ziagkos	2012	2014	
(Slovenia) Jure Zdovc	2015	2017	
(Greece) Sotiris Manolopoulos	2017	2017	
(Italy) Luca Banchi	2018	2019	FIBA Intercontinental Cup Champion (2019)
(Greece) Ilias Papatheodorou	2019	2021	Greek Cup Winner (2020)
(Greece) Vangelis Angelou	2021	2021	
(Greece) Stefanos Dedas	2021	2022	
(Spain) Curro Segura	2022	2022	
(Greece) Ilias Kantzouris	2022	2023	
(Spain) Joan Plaza	2023	2024	

== Chairmen history ==
Chairman	Years
(Greece) Konstantinos Spanoudis	(1924–1932)
(Greece) Alexandros Strogilos	(1932–1933)
(Greece) Konstantinos Sarifis	(1933–1935)
(Greece) Konstantinos Theofanidis	(1935–1937)
(Greece) Konstantinos Chrisopoulos	(1937–1938)
(Greece) Vassilios Fridas	(1938–1940)
(Greece) Emilios Ionas	(1945–1949)
(Greece) Spiridon Skouras	(1949–1950)
(Greece) Georgios Melas	(1950–1952)
(Greece) Eleftherios Venizelos	(1952)
(Greece) Georgios Chrisafidis	(1952–1957)
(Greece) Nikolaos Goumas	(1957–1963)
(Greece) Alexandros Makridis	(1963–1966)
(Greece) Georgios Toubalidis	(1966)
(Greece) Michail Trikoglou	(1966–1967)
(Greece) Emmanuil Calitsounakis	(1967)
(Greece) Kosmas Kiriakidis	(1967–1968)
(Greece) Ilias Georgopoulos	(1968–1969)
(Greece) Georgios Chrisafidis	(1969–1970)

Chairman	Years
(Greece) Kosmas Chatzicharalabous	(1970–1973)
(Greece) Dimitrios Avramidis	(1973)
(Greece) Ioannis Theodorakopoulos	(1973–1974)
(Greece) Loukas Barlos	(1974–1979)
(Greece) Kosmas Chatzicharalabous	(1979–1986)
(Greece) Dimitris Rousakis	(1986–1987)
(Greece) Takis Dimitrakopoulos	(1987–1988)
(Greece) Chrysostomos Psomiadis	(1988–1989)
(Greece) Takis Dimitrakopoulos	(1989–1990)
(Greece) Dimitris Rousakis	(1990–1991)
(Greece) Konstantinos Voutsopoulos	(1991–1993)
(Greece) Chrysostomos Psomiadis	(1993–1994)
(Greece) Michalis Lefakis	(1994–1995)
(Greece) Ioannis Filippou	(1995–2006)
(Greece) Ioannis Granitsas	(2006–2007)
(Greece) Vasilis Tzivelekis	(2007–2008)
(Greece) Charalambos Karamanlis	(2008–2011)
(Greece) Nikos Georgantzoglou	(2011–2014)
(Greece) Makis Angelopoulos	(2014–present)

== Relationship with other clubs ==
AEK has links with many basketball clubs in Greece, and other countries where Greek immigrants and friends of the club live, like ΑΕΚ Stockholm B.C. in Sweden, and Greek clubs like AEK Argos B.C. and AEK Tripolis B.C.

== Bibliography ==
- Μακρίδης, Παναγιώτης (1955). Η ΙΣΤΟΡΙΑ ΤΗΣ ΑΕΚ (in Greek). Αθήνα, Ελλάδα: Αθλητική Ηχώ.
- Συλλογικό έργο (1979). Η αθλητική δράση των Ρωμιών της Πόλης 1896–1976 (in Greek). Κωνσταντινούπολη, Τουρκία: Ειδική Έκδοση.
- Αλεξανδρής, Γ.Χ. (1996). Η Ιστορία της ΑΕΚ (in Greek). Αθήνα, Ελλάδα: Ιδιωτική Έκδοση Γ.Χ. Αλεξανδρής.
- Καραπάνος, Παναγιώτης (1999). Το αλφαβητάρι της ΑΕΚ: Όλα όσα πρέπει να ξέρεις και δεν σου έχουν πει για την ΑΕΚ (in Greek). Αθήνα, Ελλάδα: Εκδόσεις Δίαυλος. ISBN 978-960-531-066-0.
- Νόταρης, Ι. Σωτήρης (2002). ΑΕΚ, κλασικός αθλητισμός: Ο καρπός της αθλητικής παράδοσης της Πόλης στη σύγχρονη Αθήνα από το 1924 έως τις μέρες μας (in Greek). Αθήνα, Ελλάδα: Εκδόσεις Καλαβρία.
- Συλλογικό έργο (2007). Ο Κιτρινόμαυρος Δικέφαλος (in Greek). Αθήνα, Ελλάδα: Εκδόσεις Παπαδόπουλος. ISBN 978-960-412-558-6.
- Συλλογικό έργο (2009). ΑΕΚ: Για πάντα πρωταθλητές (in Greek). Αθήνα, Ελλάδα: Εκδόσεις Σκάι. ISBN 978-960-482-018-4.
- Κακίσης, Σωτήρης (2011). Ένωσις! (in Greek). Λευκωσία, Κύπρος: Εκδόσεις Αιγαίον. ISBN 978-996-369-277-4.
- Συλλογικό έργο (2014). 90 ΧΡΟΝΙΑ, Η ΙΣΤΟΡΙΑ ΤΗΣ ΑΕΚ (in Greek). Αθήνα, Ελλάδα: Εκδοτικός Οίκος Α. Α. Λιβάνη. ISBN 978-960-14-2802-4.
- Αγγελίδης, Νικόλαος (2017). Όλες οι ΑΕΚ του κόσμου (in Greek). Αθήνα, Ελλάδα: Εκδόσεις Νότιος Άνεμος. ISBN 978-960-951-152-0.

== Filmography ==
- Tassos Boulmetis, 1968 (film), 2018.
