= Nestoras Kommatos =

Former Greek basketball player (born 1977)

Nestoras Kommatos Νέστορας Κόμματος
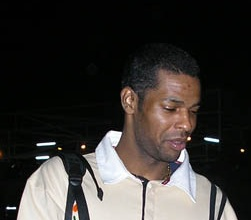
- Kommatos, in 2007.

Personal information
- Born: May 4, 1977 (age 49) Larissa, Greece
- Listed height: 6 ft 8 in (2.03 m)
- Listed weight: 245 lb (111 kg)

Career information
- Playing career: 1996–2019
- Position: Small forward / power forward / center

Career history
- 1996–2000: Gymnastikos S. Larissas
- 2000–2001: Makedonikos
- 2001–2003: PAOK Thessaloniki
- 2003–2004: Aris Thessaloniki
- 2004–2005: Maccabi Tel Aviv
- 2005–2006: Fortitudo Bologna
- 2006: Sevilla
- 2006–2007: AEK Athens
- 2007–2008: Lokomotiv Rostov
- 2008: Trikala 2000
- 2008–2009: AEL 1964
- 2009: Zob Ahan Isfahan
- 2009–2010: Gymnastikos Olympia
- 2010–2011: Maroussi
- 2011: Mersin
- 2011–2012: Maroussi
- 2012: Pallacanestro Sant'Antimo
- 2012–2013: Rethymno
- 2013: Trikala Aries
- 2013–2014: Kolossos Rodou
- 2014–2019: Ermis Agias

Career highlights
- EuroLeague champion (2005); Israeli Premier League champion (2005); Israeli State Cup winner (2005); Greek Cup winner (2004); Greek League Top Scorer (2004); Greek Cup Finals MVP (2004); Greek All-Star Game MVP (2004); Italian Supercup winner (2006)

Nestoras Kommatos (Greek: Νέστορας Κόμματος; born May 4, 1977) is a Greek former professional basketball player and, as of recently, the team manager for Larisa (formerly known as Ermis Agias) of the Greek Basket League. During his pro club career, at a height of 6 ft 8 in (2.03 m) tall, he played at the small forward, power forward and center positions.

== Professional career ==
Kommatos began his career with the youth teams of Perseas Larissas. He then transferred to the Greek club Gymnastikos S. Larissas, in 1996. In 2000, he transferred to the Greek team Makedonikos. He then moved to the Greek team PAOK, where he stayed for a year, and then to the Greek team Aris.

In 2005, Kommatos moved to the Israeli Super League basketball giants Maccabi Tel Aviv, and he won the EuroLeague's 2005 championship with them. He then played with Fortitudo Bologna in the Italian League, and then with Sevilla in the Spanish League. In 2006, he played with the Greek club AEK Athens, and in 2007, he moved to the Russian club Lokomotiv Rostov.

Kommatos joined the Greek League club AEL 1964, for the 2008–09 season. In the 2009–10 season, he played with the Greek club Gymnastikos Olympia. In the 2010–11 season, he played with the Greek club Maroussi and the Turkish club Mersin.

Kommatos began the 2011–12 season with Maroussi, and in February 2012, he moved to Sant'Antimo of the Italian Second Division, to replace Milivoje Božović, who was out for the remainder of the season, due to an injury. He played with the Greek club Rethymno, during the 2012–13 season. He joined the Greek club Trikala Aries, on 13 September 2013.

He then moved to the Greek club Kolossos Rodou, before joining the Greek club Ermis Agias Larissa, where he finished his career, spending his last five active seasons.

== National team career ==
Kommatos was also a member of the senior Greek national basketball team. With Greece's senior national team, he had 5 caps (games played).

== Personal life ==
Kommatos is the son of a Greek father, and a Guyanese mother. His nickname is "NES".

== Awards and accomplishments ==
- 2× Greek League All-Star: (2003, 2004)
- Greek All-Star Game MVP: (2004)
- Greek Cup Winner: (2004)
- Greek Cup MVP: (2004)
- Israeli State Cup Winner: (2005)
- EuroLeague Champion: (2005)
- Israeli League Champion: (2005)
- Triple Crown Winner: (2005)
- Italian Supercup Winner: (2005)
