= Orfeas Stasinos =

Greek basketball player

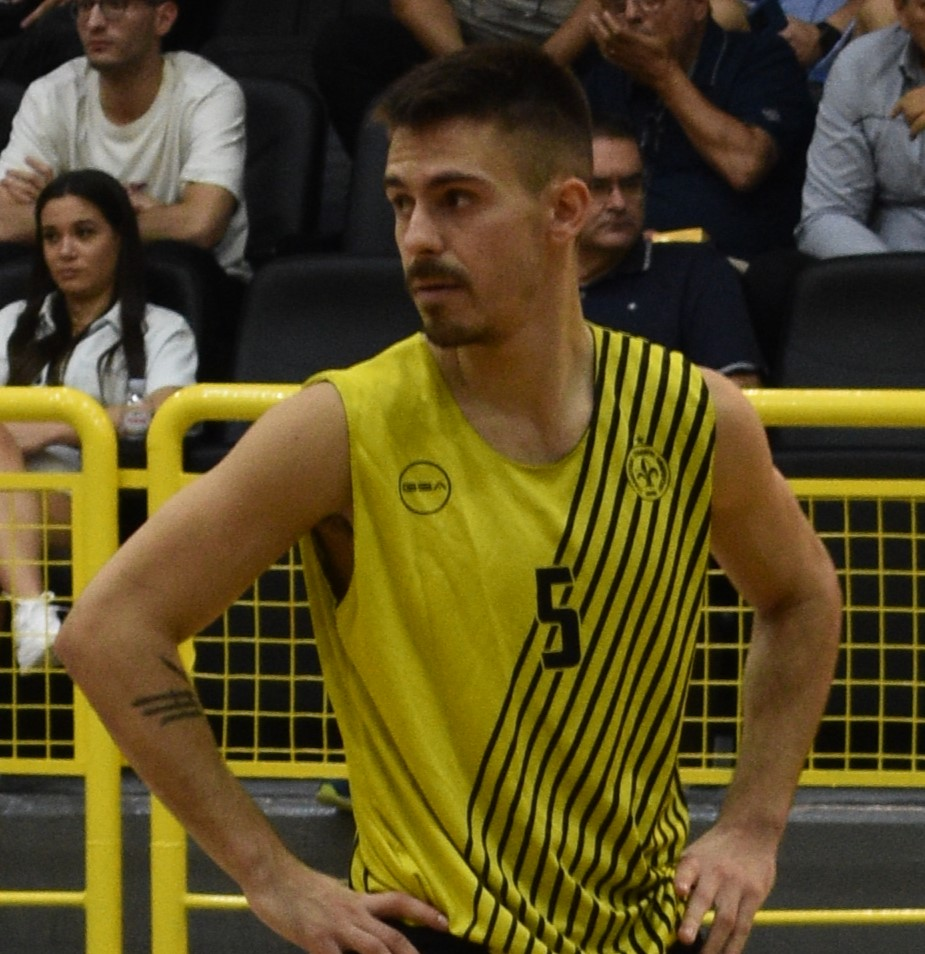
- Stasinos in 2023

Lavrio
- Position: Point guard
- League: Greek A2 Elite League

Personal information
- Born: September 5, 1999 (age 27) Athens, Greece
- Listed height: 6 ft 0 in (1.83 m)
- Listed weight: 172 lb (78 kg)

Career information
- NBA draft: 2021: undrafted
- Playing career: 2014–present

Career history
- 2014–2019: Maroussi
- 2019–2020: Ifaistos Limnou
- 2020–present: Maroussi
- 2025–present: → Lavrio

Career highlights
- Greek A2 Elite League champion (2023)

Orfeas Stasinos (Greek: Ορφέας Στασινός; born September 5, 1999) is a Greek professional basketball player for Lavrio of the Greek A2 Elite League, on loan from Maroussi. He is a 1.83 m (6 ft. 0} in.) tall point guard. He is considered to be a Maroussi fan favorite player.

== Youth career ==
Stasinos played from a young age with the youth teams of Maroussi, before he started his pro career.

== Professional career ==
Stasinos made his professional debut with Maroussi in 2014 at the age of 14. After this season, he became a regular member in the team's squad. From 2017 to 2019, he played with Maroussi in the Greek A2 Elite League, where he was one of the stars of the team.

For the 2019–20 season, he joined Ifaistos Limnou of the Greek Basket League, under coach Sotiris Manolopoulos, but he saw limited time of action.

The following year, he returned to Maroussi in the Greek A2 Elite League. He became one of the stars of the team, and he led Maroussi to the promotion to the Greek Basket League after 12 years.

On July 4, 2025, Stasinos renewed his contract with Maroussi through 2028. He was subsequently loaned to Lavrio for the 2025–2026 campaign.
