= Vangelis Sakellariou =

Greek basketball player

Vangelis Sakellariou Βαγγέλης Σακελλαρίου
Free agent
- Position: Shooting guard / point guard

Personal information
- Born: August 4, 1989 (age 37) Athens, Greece
- Listed height: 6 ft 4.75 in (1.95 m)
- Listed weight: 210 lb (95 kg)

Career information
- NBA draft: 2011: undrafted
- Playing career: 2007–present

Career history
- 2007–2008: Aigaleo
- 2008: Sidigas Avellino
- 2008–2009: Pagrati
- 2009–2010: Trikala 2000
- 2010–2011: Rethymno
- 2011–2012: Maroussi
- 2012–2013: Nea Kifissia
- 2013–2016: Lavrio
- 2016–2018: Panionios
- 2018–2019: Panathinaikos
- 2019: Aris Thessaloniki
- 2019–2020: Ionikos Nikaias

Career highlights
- Greek League champion (2019); Greek Cup winner (2019); 2× Greek 2nd Division champion (2013, 2017)
Medals
Men's basketball
Representing Greece
FIBA Europe Under-20 Championship
Gold medal – first place	2009 Greece	Under-20

Evangelos "Vangelis" Sakellariou (alternate spellings: Vagel, Vaggelis) (Greek: Ευάγγελος "Βαγγέλης" Σακελλαρίου; born October 4, 1989, in Athens, Greece) is a Greek professional basketball player who last played for Ionikos Nikaias of the Greek Basket League. He is 1.95m (6'4 3/4") tall, and he can play at the point guard and shooting guard positions.

== Professional career ==
In his pro career, Sakellariou has played in both the top-tier level Italian League, with Sidigas Avellino, and in the top-tier level Greek League. He was an early entry into the 2009 NBA draft. He joined the Greek EuroLeague club Panathinaikos, on July 31, 2018.

On February 17, 2019, he won the final of the 2019 Greek Cup, which was held at the Heraklion Indoor Sports Arena, on Crete. Sakellariou also won the 2018–19 Greek League season's championship with Panathinaikos. He averaged 2.5 points and 3.0 rebounds, in 10.0 minutes per game in the Greek League that season.

== National team career ==
Sakellariou was a member of the junior national teams of Greece. With Greece's junior national teams, he played at both the 2008 FIBA Europe Under-20 Championship, and the 2009 FIBA Europe Under-20 Championship, where he won a gold medal.
