= Angelos Siamandouras =

Greek basketball player

Angelos Siamandouras Άγγελος Σιαμανδούρας
Nikoforos
- Position: Center

Personal information
- Born: 18 August 1980 (age 46) Athens, Greece
- Listed height: 6 ft 10 in (2.08 m)

Career information
- Playing career: 2000–present

Career history
- 2000–2001: Panellinios
- 2003–2005: Maroussi
- 2005–2006: Near East
- 2006–2007: Sporting
- 2007–2008: Iraklis Thessaloniki
- 2008–2009: Peristeri
- 2009–2010: Aigaleo
- 2010–2011: Maroussi
- 2011–2013: AEK Athens
- 2013–2015: Kymis
- 2015–present: Nikiforos

Career highlights
- 2× Greek 2nd Division champion (2007, 2009)
Medals
Men's basketball
Representing Greece
Mediterranean Games
Silver medal – second place	2005 Almería	Under-26

Angelos Siamandouras (alternate spelling: Aggelos) (Greek: Άγγελος Σιαμανδούρας; born 1980) is a Greek professional basketball player. He is 2.08 m (6 ft 10 in) in height, and he plays at the center position.

== Professional career ==
Siamandouras started his club career with the Greek club Panellinios (2000–01), and he subsequently played with the following Greek clubs: Panelefsiniakos (2001–02), Maroussi (2003–05), Nea East (2005–06), Sporting (2006–07), Iraklis (2007–08), Peristeri (2008–09), Aigaleo (2009–10), back to Maroussi (2010–11), AEK Athens (2011–13), and Kymis (2013–15).

== National team career ==
Siamandouras played with the Greek under-26 national team at the 2005 Mediterranean Games.
