= Georgios Maslarinos =

Greek basketball player

Personal information
- Born: February 26, 1974 (age 52) Sweden
- Listed height: 6 ft 4.5 in (1.94 m)

Career information
- Playing career: 1991–2010
- Position: Shooting guard

Career history
- 1991–1996: VAO
- 1993–1994: →Aris B.C.
- 1996–1997: Libertas Forlì
- 1997–2000: PAOK
- 2000–2003: Maroussi B.C.
- 2003–2004: Panathinaikos
- 2004–2006: Panellinios B.C.
- 2007–2008: ICBS
- 2009–2010: Ermis Langada

Career highlights
- Saporta Cup champion (2001); Greek League champion (2004); Greek Cup winner (1999)
Medals
Men's basketball
Representing Greece
FIBA Europe U16 Championship
Silver medal – second place	1991 Greece	Team

Georgios Maslarinos (alternate spelling: Georgios) (Greek: Γιώργος Μασλαρινός); born February 26, 1974, in Sweden is a retired Greek professional basketball player.

== Professional career ==
Maslarinos started his career with VAO. In 1993 he was loaned to Aris B.C. for one year, and he played in Greek Basketball League for first time, and the 1993–94 FIBA European Cup. In 1994 he returned to VAO, and he was the leader of the team. He won two consecutive promotion from B Ethniki to the first Division. During the 1995–96 season Maslarinos was the first scorer in A2 League. In 1996 he joined to Libertas Forlì, and played in 24 games and 8 points average. In 1997 he transferred to PAOK and he played until 2000. He won the Greek Basketball Cup in 1999 and he played at Euroleague for first time in his career. Maslarinos also spend three years with Maroussi B.C. and he won the Saporta Cup in 2001. In 2003 he joined to Panathinaikos and he won the Greek Basketball League champion the following year. He continued his career with Panellinios B.C. He closed his career in A2 league, playing with ICBS and Ermis Langada.

== National team career ==
Maslarinos won the silver game at the FIBA Europe Under-16 Championship. He also played at the 1992 FIBA Europe Under-18 Championship and won the fourth place.
