= Nikos Linardos =

Greek basketball player and coach

Personal information
- Born: August 26, 1963 (age 63) Athens, Greece
- Listed height: 6 ft 8 in (2.03 m)
- Listed weight: 220 lb (100 kg)

Career information
- Playing career: 1981–1995
- Position: Power forward
- Number: 11
- Coaching career: 1995–present

Career history

Playing
- 1981–1991: Panionios
- 1991–1992: Sporting
- 1993–1994: Panellinios
- 1994–1995: Maroussi

Coaching
- 1995–1997: Marathonas Athens
- 1997–1998: North Carolina (assistant)
- 1998: Greece Under-18 (Assistant)
- 1998: Greece (Video Coordinator)
- 1998–1999: Duke (assistant)
- 1999–2001: Maroussi (assistant)
- 2001: Maroussi
- 2002–2003: APOEL
- 2003–2004: Apollon Limassol
- 2004–2006: Panionios (assistant)
- 2006: Panionios
- 2006–2011: Maroussi (assistant)
- 2007–2008: Greece (assistant)
- 2011–2012: Maroussi
- 2012–2013: Limoges (assistant)

Career highlights
- As a player: Greek Cup winner (1991); As a head coach: Cypriot Cup winner (2003)
Medals
Men's basketball
Representing Greece
FIBA EuroBasket
Gold medal – first place	1987 Greece

Nikos Linardos (Greek: Νίκος Λινάρδος; born August 26, 1963, in Greece) is a Greek former professional basketball player and coach. During his playing career, at a height of 2.03 m (6 ft 8 in) tall, he played at the power forward position.

== Professional career ==
Linardos played club basketball with the Greek League team Panionios Athens. He was a member of the Panionios team that finished in 2nd place in the Greek League in 1987, which is the club's highest ever finish in the league. He was also a member of the Panionios team that won the 1991 Greek Cup title, which is the only top-tier level title in the club's history. During his club career, he also played with the Greek clubs Sporting Athens, Panellinios Athens, and Maroussi Athens.

== National team career ==
Linardos was a member of the senior men's Greek national team. With Greece, he won the gold medal at the 1987 FIBA EuroBasket.

== Coaching career ==
After his playing career ended, Linardos worked as a basketball coach. He worked as an assistant basketball coach under head coach Dean Smith, at North Carolina, in the 1997–98 season. He also worked as an assistant under head coach Mike Krzyzewski at Duke, in the 1998–99 season. Linardos was also an assistant coach under Vangelis Alexandris at Maroussi Athens, and under Panagiotis Giannakis, in the senior men's Greek national team, from 2007 to 2008.

Linardos was the head coach of the Greek club Maroussi, and the Cypriot club APOEL. With APOEL, he won the Cypriot Cup title in 2003. After that, he worked as the head coach of the Cypriot club Apollon Limassol, and the reek club Panionios Athens.

In 2013, Linardos began to coach a youth academy basketball team in Galatsi, Athens, along with his former teammate from his playing days, Michalis Romanidis. In July 2018, Linardos became the Director of the basketball academies of Panionios GSS.

== Sports commentating career ==
Linardos has also worked as a sports commentator, doing analysis during broadcasts of basketball games on Greek TV.

== Personal life ==
Linardos' father, Petros (1925–2022), was a sports journalist and author. His grandparents were refugees from Smyrna.
