= Trikala B.C. =

Trikala B.C. may refer to:

- Trikala 2000 B.C., a Greek professional basketball club that existed from 2000 to 2010
- Trikala Aries B.C., a Greek professional basketball club active from 1993 on
