= 2008–09 Greek Basket League =

2008–09 Greek Basket League season
- League: Greek Basket League
- Sport: Basketball
- Duration: 4 October 2008 – 3 June 2009
- Teams: 14
- TV partner(s): ANT1, ERT, Nova Sports

Regular Season
- Season champions: Olympiacos
- Season MVP: (Greece) Vassilis Spanoulis
- Top scorer: (United States) Anthony Grundy 399 Points (15.7 PPG)

Playoffs

Finals
- Champions: Panathinaikos
- Runners-up: Olympiacos
- Finals MVP: (United States) Drew Nicholas

Greek Basket League seasons
- ← 2007–08 2009–10 →

The 2008–09 Greek Basket League season was the 69th season of the Greek Basket League, the highest tier professional basketball league in Greece. The 182-game regular season (26 games for each of the 14 teams) began on Saturday, October 4, 2008, and ended on Sunday, May 10, 2009. The playoffs ended on June 3, 2009.

== Teams ==
Location of teams in Greek Basket League 2008–09

Club	Home city
AEK Athens	Athens
AEL 1964	Larissa
Aigaleo	Aigaleo, Athens
Aris	Thessaloniki
Kavala	Kavala
Kolossos Rodou	Rhodes
Maroussi	Maroussi, Athens
Olympia Larissa	Larissa
Olympiacos	Piraeus
Panathinaikos	Athens
Panellinios	Athens
Panionios	Nea Smyrni, Athens
PAOK	Thessaloniki
Trikala 2000	Trikala

== Regular season ==
=== Standings ===
Pos	Team	Total							Home		Away	
		Pts	Pld	W	L	F	A	D	W	L	W	L
1.	Olympiacos	51	26	25	1	2229	1826	+403	13	0	12	1
2.	Panathinaikos	48	26	22	4	2277	1797	+480	13	0	9	4
3.	Aris	45	26	19	7	1883	1775	+108	11	2	8	5
4.	Maroussi	43	26	17	9	2035	1921	+114	9	4	8	5
5.	Panellinios	43	26	17	9	2037	1888	+149	10	3	7	6
6.	Panionios	42	26	16	10	1948	1931	+17	10	3	6	7
7.	PAOK	38	26	12	14	2005	1991	+14	9	4	3	10
8.	Kolossos Rodou	38	26	12	14	1900	1988	-88	8	5	4	9
9.	AEK Athens	37	26	11	15	1896	1998	-102	8	5	3	10
10.	Kavala	35	26	9	17	1765	1948	-183	7	6	2	11
11.	Olympia Larissa	34	26	8	18	1769	1907	-138	5	8	3	10
12.	Trikala	32	26	6	20	1901	2115	-214	5	8	1	12
13.	Aigaleo	32	26	6	20	1793	2035	-242	4	9	2	11
14.	AEL	28	26	2	24	1833	2151	-318	2	11	0	13

Pts=Points, Pld=Matches played, W=Matches won, L=Matches lost, F=Points for, A=Points against, D=Points difference

Qualification to League Playoffs
Relegation to HEBA A2

=== Results ===
Results as of December 19, 2008

	AEK	AEL	AIG	ARI	KAV	KOL	MAR	OLL	OLY	PAO	PGS	PAN	PAOK	TRI
AEK Athens		89-88	65-71	71-57	78-75	78-59	75-84	72-70	75-95	70-79	59-72	85-87	93-85	69-67
AEL	63-62		83-85	68-75	72-80	69-76	76-87	87-107	72-90	78-83	78-92	67-79	95-97	73-71
Aigaleo	59-61	90-56	80-66		72-77	72-81	62-66	72-81	65-90	81-96	88-99	53-76	78-74	78-71
Aris	77-61	77-62		75-57	78-59	72-53	83-73	62-46	73-77	69-74	70-64	71-59	87-76	68-61
Kavala	73-59	66-65	68-74	63-50		66-58	72-81	64-53	51-82	55-94	52-68	58-62	73-72	80-66
Kolossos Rodou	86-68	79-70	79-85	75-62	101-84		81-77	68-65	73-79	66-92	79-86	88-71	70-66	86-87
Maroussi	86-81	87-69	66-70	66-72	82-73	82-67		69-49	81-82	80-70	102-80	70-78	87-76	87-74
Olympia Larissa	82-77	68-67	55-73	77-61	72-61	62-73	69-78		66-82	65-90	64-71	78-82	74-80	67-66
Olympiacos		100-62	74-57	106-61	90-68		80-70			77-75	92-77			
Panathinaikos	86-82	102-58	84-59	103-77	96-69	91-53	82-54	80-61	86-69		93-64	97-50	107-97	81-62
Panellinios	74-82	91-71	76-55	83-68	74-61	70-66	81-84	82-60	84-88	84-74		66-60	68-65	99-52
Panionios		74-57	89-85	93-77	78-67	75-60	70-84			71-91	72-70			
PAOK		65-57	50-57	88-65	85-66	104-79	76-71			77-76	60-74	76-80		
Trikala		79-70	82-84	73-61	86-82	75-94	73-81			69-93	93-88		66-77	

== Playoffs ==
This is the outlook for the 2009 Α1 playoffs. Teams in bold advance to the next round.

Quarter-finals
**1**	**Olympiacos**	**84**	**86**	–
8	Kolossos Rodou	61	76	–
**4**	**Maroussi**	**82**	**93**	–
5	Panellinios	77	57	–
**2**	**Panathinaikos**	**97**	**82**	–
7	PAOK	54	78	–
**3**	**Aris**	**75**	**79**	–
6	Panionios	74	75	–

Semi-finals
**1**	**Olympiacos**	**102**	**93**	**81**	–	–
4	Maroussi	80	78	67	–	–
**2**	**Panathinaikos**	**84**	**66**	**71**	–	–
3	Aris	80	53	69	–	–

Finals
1	Olympiacos	67	64	**74**	81	–
**2**	**Panathinaikos**	**69**	**91**	70	**94**	–
EuroLeague Qualification Rounds Match
3	Aris	**90**	78	**82**	70	72
**4**	**Maroussi**	86	**85**	57	**72**	**76**

== Final standings ==
Pos	Team
1.	Panathinaikos
2.	Olympiacos
3.	Maroussi
4.	Aris
5.	Panellinios
6.	Panionios
7.	PAOK
8.	Kolossos Rodou
9.	AEK Athens
10.	Kavala
11.	Olympia Larissa
12.	Trikala
13.	Aigaleo
14.	AEL

2009–10 Euroleague Regular Season
2009–10 Euroleague Qualification Round
Eurocup 2009–10 Regular Season
Eurocup 2009–10 Qualification Round
Relegation to HEBA A2 2009–10

- Aris was granted a wildcard to play in the 2009–10 Euroleague Qualification Round.

Greek Basket League 2008–09
Champions
**Panathinaikos**
**30th Title**

== Awards ==
=== Greek League MVP ===
- (Greece) Vassilis Spanoulis – Panathinaikos

=== Greek League Finals MVP ===
- (United States) Drew Nicholas – Panathinaikos

=== All-Greek League Team ===
- (Greece) Vassilis Spanoulis – Panathinaikos
- (Lithuania) Šarūnas Jasikevičius – Panathinaikos
- (United States) Mike Batiste – Panathinaikos
- (Greece) Ioannis Bourousis – Olympiacos
- (Montenegro) Nikola Peković – Panathinaikos

=== Best Coach ===
- (Serbia) Željko Obradović – Panathinaikos

=== Defensive Player of the Year ===
- (Greece) Dimitris Diamantidis – Panathinaikos

=== Best Young Player ===
- (Greece) Kostas Papanikolaou – Aris

== Statistical leaders ==
Greek Basket League stats leaders are counted by totals, rather than averages, and include both regular season.

=== Points ===
Pos.	Player	Club	Total points
**1.**	(United States) **Anthony Grundy**	Panellinios	**399**
2.	(United States) Steven Smith	Kolossos	384
3.	(Greece) Makis Nikolaidis	Trikala	360
4.	(United States) William Avery	Trikala	349
5.	(United States) Keydren Clark	Aris	348

=== Rebounds ===
Pos.	Player	Club	Total Rebounds
**1.**	(United States) **Torin Francis**	A.E.L.	**185**
2.	(Serbia) Dejan Tomašević	PAOK	183
3.	(United States) Spencer Nelson	Aris	178
4.	(United States) Travon Bryant	AEK	167
5.	(Greece) Ioannis Bourousis	Olympiacos	160

=== Assists ===
Pos.	Player	Club	Total Assists
**1.**	(Greece) **Thodoris Papaloukas**	Olympiacos	**100**
2.	(United States) Anthony Grundy	Panellinios	97
3.	(United States) Aaron Miles	Panionios	92
4.	(United States) Billy Keys	Maroussi	90
5.	(United States) William Avery	Trikala	83

=== Steals ===
Pos.	Player	Club	Total Steals
**1.**	(United States) **Aaron Miles**	Panionios	**58**
2.	(United States) Anthony Grundy	Panellinios	56
3.	(United States) Lance Harris	Kolossos	56
4.	(Greece) Marios Batis	Olympia	34
5.	(Greece) Manolis Papamakarios	Panellinios	33

=== Blocks ===
Pos.	Player	Club	Total Blocks
**1.**	(United States) **Torin Francis**	A.E.L.	**29**
2.	(Greece) Andreas Glyniadakis	Maroussi	24
3.	(Greece) Ioannis Bourousis	Olympiacos	20
4.	(United States) Travon Bryant	AEK	20
5.	(Greece) Kostas Charissis	Kolossos	20

== Clubs in international competitions ==
Team	Competition	Result
Panathinaikos	EuroLeague	Final-4, 1st place
Olympiacos	EuroLeague	Final-4, 4th place
Panionios	EuroLeague	Regular season, 6th place
Maroussi	EuroCup	Top 16, 3rd place
Panellinios	EuroCup	Top 16, 4th place
Aris	EuroCup	Regular season, 3rd place
Olympia Larissa	FIBA EuroChallenge	Regular season, 4th place
