= Dimitrios Marmarinos =

Greek basketball player

Dimitris Marmarinos Δημήτρης Μαρμαρινός
Personal information
- Born: May 14, 1976 (age 50) Chalkida, Greece
- Listed height: 6 ft 9.5 in (2.07 m)
- Listed weight: 275 lb (125 kg)

Career information
- College: Nevada (1998–1999)
- NBA draft: 1998: undrafted
- Playing career: 1996–2015
- Position: Power forward / center
- Number: 9

Career history
- 1999–2000: Esperos Kallitheas
- 2000–2003: Maroussi Athens
- 2003–2004: Apollon Patras
- 2004: Udine
- 2004–2005: Teramo Basket
- 2005–2006: Panionios
- 2006–2007: Virtus Roma
- 2007: Eldo Napoli
- 2007–2008: Lokomotiv Rostov
- 2008–2009: PAOK
- 2009: Juvecaserta Basket
- 2010: Trikala 2000
- 2010–2011: Iraklis
- 2011–2012: Pierikos Archelaos
- 2013–2014: Kavala
- 2014–2015: Psychiko
- 2017–2019: Ermis
- 2019–2020: Aristotelis

Career highlights
- FIBA Saporta Cup champion (2001)
Medals
Men's basketball
Representing Greece
Mediterranean Games
| Silver medal – second place | 2001 Tunis | Under-26 |

Dimitrios Marmarinos (alternate spelling: Dimitris) (Greek: Δημήτρης Μαρμαρινός; born on May 14, 1976, in Chalkida, Greece) is a Greek former professional basketball player. At a height of 2.07 m (6'9 1/2") tall, he played at the power forward and center positions.

== College career ==
Marmarinos played college basketball at the University of Nevada, with the Nevada Wolf Pack.

== Professional career ==
Marmarinos won the FIBA Saporta Cup's 2000–01 season championship, while playing with the Greek club Maroussi. In February 2011, he signed with the Greek club Iraklis Thessaloniki. On December 30, 2014, he signed with the Greek 2nd Division club Psychiko.

== National team career ==
Marmarinos played with Greece's under-26 selection at the 2001 Mediterranean Games, where he won a silver medal.
