= Michalis Polytarchou =

Greek professional basketball player (born 1983)

Michalis Polytarchou Μιχάλης Πολυτάρχου
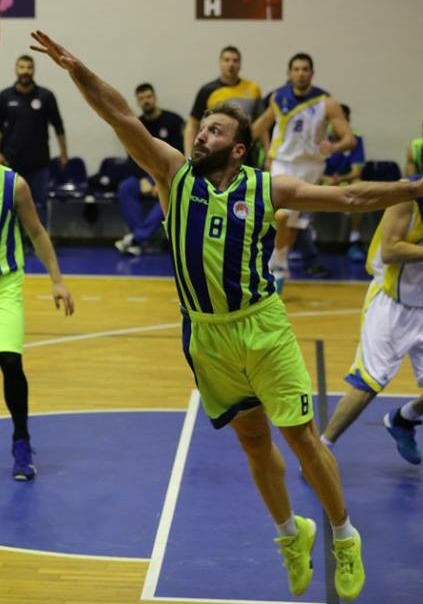
- Polytarchou with Peristeri, in 2016.

No. 8 – Holargos
- Position: Shooting guard
- League: National League 1

Personal information
- Born: June 23, 1983 (age 43) Naxos, Greece
- Listed height: 6 ft 2.75 in (1.90 m)
- Listed weight: 227 lb (103 kg)

Career information
- Playing career: 2000–present

Career history
- 2000–2003: Pannaxiakos
- 2003–2004: Trikala 2000
- 2004–2006: Argonaftis Rafinas
- 2006–2007: Ardittos
- 2007–2008: AOK Ierapetra
- 2008–2012: Ikaros-Esperos Kallitheas
- 2012–2015: AEK Athens
- 2015–2018: Peristeri
- 2018–2019: Iraklis
- 2019–2020: Diagoras Dryopideon
- 2020–2021: Aigaleo
- 2021–2022: Psychiko
- 2022: Triton
- 2023: Megarida
- 2023: Esperos Lamias
- 2024: Ethnikos Livadeias
- 2024–2006: Dafni Dafniou
- 2026–: Holargos

Career highlights
- 3× Greek 2nd Division champion (2010, 2014, 2018); 1× Greek 3rd Division champion (2026)

Michalis Polytarchou (Greek: Μιχάλης Πολυτάρχου; born June 23, 1983) is a Greek professional basketball player who plays for Holargos of the National League 1. He is a 1.90 m (6' 2 3/4") tall shooting guard.

== Professional career ==
Polytarchou began his career with the team of his homeland, Pannaxiakos, playing in the regional leagues of Cyclades. Later, he moved to Trikala 2000, Argonaftis Rafinas B.C., Ardittos B.C., and Ierapetra B.C., playing in the lower leagues of Greek Basketball. In 2008, he moved to Ikaros-Esperos Kallitheas, where he helped the team gain a promotion from the Greek B League to the Greek A2 League, and finally a promotion to the Greek Basket League (A1), where he scored 120 total points over two seasons. In 2012, he moved to the Greek club AEK Athens, helping the team gain a promotion from the Greek B League to the Greek A2 League, and also finally AEK's return to the Greek Basket League. During his tenure with AEK, he was the team's captain.

After his release from AEK Athens, he signed a two-year contract with Peristeri. With Peristeri, he also won a league promotion with the club to move back to the Greek Basket League. After he had originally renewed his contract with Peristeri through 2019, the two sides mutually agreed to part ways on September 30, 2018. Two days later, he joined Iraklis Thessaloniki, of the Greek 2nd Division.

== Awards and accomplishments ==
=== Pannaxiakos ===
- 2002-03 Cyclades Basketball Clubs Association Champion

=== Ikaros-Esperos Kallitheas ===
- 2009–10 Greek 2nd Division Champion

=== AEK Athens ===
- 2013–14 Greek 2nd Division Champion

=== Peristeri ===
- 2017–18 Greek 2nd Division Champion

=== Dafni Dafniou ===
- 2025–26 Greek 3rd Division Champion
