= Iordanou =

Iordanou is a surname. Notable people with the surname include:

- Christos Iordanou (basketball) (born 1998), Greek basketball player
- Constantine P. Iordanou (1950–2024), Cypriot-born businessman
