= Vangelis Alexandris =

Greek basketball player and coach

Vangelis Alexandris Βαγγέλης Αλεξανδρής
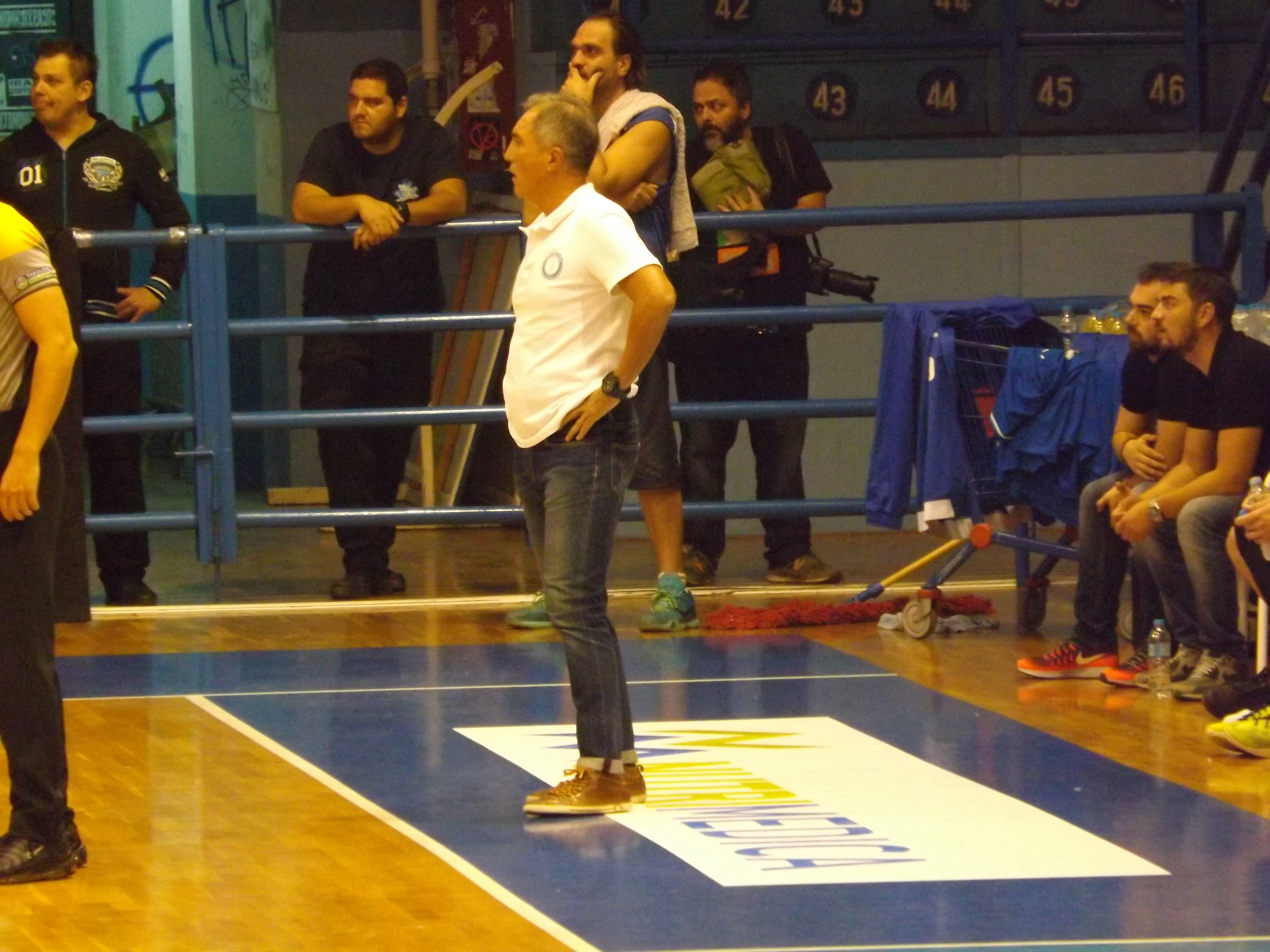
- Alexandris coaching Iraklis, in 2016.

Personal information
- Born: February 2, 1951 (age 75) Thessaloniki, Greece
- Listed height: 5 ft 11.5 in (1.82 m)
- Listed weight: 180 lb (82 kg)

Career information
- Playing career: 1971–1988
- Position: Point guard
- Number: 14
- Coaching career: 1992–present

Career history

Playing
- 1971–1980: Aris
- 1981–1985: PAOK
- 1986–1988: Iraklis Thessaloniki

Coaching
- 1992–1995: GS Larissa
- 1995: PAOK
- 1995–1997: Apollon Patras
- 1997–1998: Iraklis Thessaloniki
- 1998–1999: Irakleio
- 1999–2001: Maroussi
- 2001–2002: PAOK
- 2002–2004: Aris
- 2004–2006: Olympia Larissa
- 2006–2007: AEK Athens
- 2007: PAOK
- 2007–2008: Kolossos Rodou
- 2008–2009: Kavala
- 2009–2010: AE Larissa
- 2010–2011: Maroussi
- 2011–2012: Aris
- 2013: Kavala
- 2013–2014: Jordanian National Team
- 2014–2015: Panionios
- 2015–2018: Iraklis Thessaloniki
- 2018: Panionios

Career highlights
- As a player: Greek League champion (1979); Greek Cup winner (1984); Greek Cup Finals Top Scorer (1982); As a coach: FIBA Saporta Cup champion (2001); FIBA Europe Champions Cup champion (2003); Greek League games: 537 (2nd all-time); 5× Greek All-Star Game (1994, 1997, 2003, 2006, 2011)
Medals
Men's basketball
Representing Greece
FIBA Europe U18 Championship
Silver medal – second place	1970 Greece	Under-18

Evangelos "Vangelis" Alexandris (Greek: Ευάγγελος "Βαγγέλης" Αλεξανδρής; born February 2, 1951) is a Greek former international basketball player and coach. With a height of 1.82 meters, he played as a point guard and was nicknamed "The Tiger " due to his dynamic playing style. He is a notable figure of Greek basketball, who has won domestic and European honours at club level. His long-term presence and contribution to the sport exceeds 50 years. During his head coaching career, Alexandris won two European-wide club competitions, the FIBA Saporta Cup in the 2000–01 season and the FIBA Europe Champions Cup in the 2002–03 season.

== Professional career ==
=== Club playing career ===
Alexandris began his basketball career in December 1965 at Anagennisi Thessaloniki, where his athleticism and talent quickly stood out, attracting the interest of many major teams. The promising youngster was approached by two great personalities of Thessaloniki basketball, Orestis Angelidis of PAOK and Anestis Petalidis of Aris, who recognized his sporting value and perspective. His wish was to play for Aris, a team he has supported since childhood. The transfer took place in 1970 and due to a prohibitive regulation of the time, Alexandris, along with Charis Papageorgiou who was also competing in Anagennisi, was forced to stay out of action for a year. Along the way he developed into one of the club's leading figures in the 1970s, with the highlight of his nine-year career at Aris winning the Greek Championship in 1979, captaining the team. In the decisive 85–82 victory over Olympiacos at home, Vangelis Alexandris was the game's leading scorer with 30 points and had 20/20 free throws.

He left Aris in 1980 and after a one-year absence from competitive action (he came into conflict with the management of Aris and failed to stay free), he moved to rivals PAOK. Shortly before he signed with PAOK, his former Aris coach and teammate, Giannis Ioannidis, contacted him by phone and tried to convince him to return to Aris, but Alexandris refused. He wore the black and white jersey for four years and participated in two Cup finals. In 1982, he was the top scorer of the final with 22 points, but the trophy went to Panathinaikos who prevailed 65–63. In 1984, he competed in the "shaved heads" final, where PAOK beat Aris 74–70 and were crowned Greek Cup winners.

Towards the end of his career, at the urging of Michalis Giannouzakos, he played for Iraklis, being one of the few basketball players who have worn the jersey of all three major teams of Thessaloniki.

=== National team playing career ===
With the Greek National Youth Team, he won the silver medal at the 1970 FIBA U18 European Championship held in Athens. In the final, where Greece was defeated by a clearly superior Soviet Union 48–80 at the Panathenaic Stadium, Alexandris was the team's leading scorer with 12 points. With the Greek Men's National Team, he competed in the 1972 Pre-Olympic Tournament and the EuroBasket 1983, recording a total of 73 appearances and 344 points.

=== Player profile ===
Alexandris was a complete point guard. Having athleticism, he was fast, he possessed both defensive and attacking qualities, as well as handling skill. Defensively, he was characterized by his determination and ability to mark effectively, significantly limiting opponents' play with scoring efficiency. He was also very capable at reading the game of play and stealing the ball. Offensively, he was able to make plays, attempted many drives towards the rim and showed teamwork, providing many assists. He could score from medium or long range but more often chose to drive and shoot when he was closer to the rim. His coach Faidon Matthaiou and his teammate in the Greek National Team Vassilis Goumas, seeing his aggressive way of playing, gave him the nickname Tiger of Greek basketball, which accompanies him to this day.

== Coaching career ==
=== Club coaching career ===
Vangelis Alexandris is one of the most noteworthy Greek basketball coaches and has won two European-wide club competitions. In 1992, after two consecutive promotions he led GS Larissa to the first tier Greek League and managed to avoid relegation in the following three seasons. In 1997, he guided Apollon Patras to the final of the Greek Cup (the first provincial team to appear in a Cup final), where it took the last shot of the game to lose in OAKA 80–78 to the very powerful Olympiacos of the time, who that season won the Triple Crown. His first European title came in 2001 when he coached Maroussi and won the FIBA Saporta Cup by defeating French side Élan Chalon 74–72 in the final held in Warsaw. In 2003, he won the FIBA Europe Champions Cup with Aris, after an 84–83 victory over the Polish Prokom Trefl at Thessaloniki.

Alexandris is the only one in history who has both playing and coaching career at the three major teams of Thessaloniki, Aris, PAOK and Iraklis. He has coached a total of 13 teams in the Greek Basketball League (with Panionios being the last in 2018) and with 537 games he is in 2nd place of all time. He was present in 5 Greek All-Star Games as a coach (two as a head coach, three as an assistant) and in 4 Final fours of the Greek Cup. Several Greek coaches with a remarkable career in the field of basketball, when they took their first steps in coaching, were members of the technical staff and assistant coaches of Vangelis Alexandris, such as Dimitrios Itoudis (1995 - PAOK), Dimitrios Priftis (2006 - AEK) and Sotiris Manolopoulos (2010 - Maroussi). According to Alexandris, his coaching philosophy is largely due to the patriarch of Greek basketball Faidon Matthaiou, who was his coach in the Greek National Team and PAOK and considers him as his mentor.

In recent years he has been the director of the basketball academies of Aetos Filyrou Thessaloniki.

=== National team coaching career ===
In May 2013, Alexandris was hired to coach the senior men's Jordanian national basketball team. He coached Jordan's team at the 2013 FIBA Asia Championship.

== Career highlights and awards ==
=== As a player ===
Greek National Youth Team

- 1970 FIBA Europe Under-18 Championship: Silver

Aris

- Greek League champion: (1979)

PAOK

- Greek Cup winner: (1984)

=== As a head coach ===
Maroussi

- FIBA Saporta Cup champion: (2001)

Aris

- FIBA Europe Champions Cup champion: (2003)

=== Individual ===
- Greek Cup Finals Top Scorer: (1982)
- Greek League games as a head coach: 537 (2nd all-time)
- 5× Greek All-Star Game as a coach (two as a head coach, three as an assistant): (1994, 1997, 2003, 2006, 2011)
