= G.S. Lavrio B.C. =

Basketball club in Greece

Lavrio Megabolt
- Nickname: Metallorichoi (The Miners)
- Leagues: Greek Elite League; Greek Cup
- Founded: 1990; 36 years ago
- History: G.S. Lavrio B.C. (1990–present)
- Arena: Lavrio Indoor Hall
- Capacity: 1,700
- Location: Lavrio, Attica, Greece
- Team colors: Yellow, Blue
- Main sponsor: Megabolt
- President: Sotiris Kostidis
- Head coach: Savvas Symeonidis
- Championships: 1 Greek 3rd Division; 1 Greek 4th Division
- Website: lavriobc.gr
Home	Away

G.S. Lavrio B.C. (Greek: Γ.Σ. Λαυρίου K.A.E.), commonly known as simply Lavrio B.C., and also known for sponsorship reasons as Lavrio Megabolt and Lavrio Aegean Cargo, is a Greek professional basketball club that is based in Lavrio, Attica, Greece. The club's full name is Gymnastikos Syllogos Lavrio Basketball Club. The club's current logo is an owl, which symbolizes the ancient Athenian coins, which were made of metals from Lavrio's mines. The team currently plays in the Greek Elite League, the second-tier level basketball league in Greece, and also recently competed in the secondary level European-wide league, the FIBA Champions League.

== History ==
In 1990, Lavrio was established. From 1990 to 2002, the club competed in the neighborhood regional ESKA leagues. The club then spent five years playing at the Greek C National League level, from 2002 until 2007, when the club was promoted to the Greek B National League. During the club's first two seasons in the Greek National B League, 2007–08 and 2008–09, Lavrio ranked 6th in the final league standings. But the next season, 2009–10, it was declared the champion team of the category, after winning a tie-breaker with Panelefsiniakos (24 wins and 6 losses ). Therefore, for the first time in the club's history, it came up to the Greek A2 National League. At the same time, in the Greek Cup competition, the club was eliminated after four games, losing in the 2nd leg of the second phase of the tournament, against PAOK, by a score of 73–83.

During its first season in the Greek A2 Basket League, in 2010–11, Lavrio finished in 4th place in the league standings. In the Greek Cup tournament, the club was eliminated on the 2nd game day, where they were defeated by a score of 69–63, against Nea Kifissia. In the following season, 2011–12, while still competing in the Greek A2 League category, they finished in 8th place in the league standings. In the course of the Greek Cup, they were eliminated on the 2nd game day of Phase A, after being defeated by a score of 74–59, against Panerythraikos. In the 2012–13 season, the team continued its good performances, and finished in 5th place in the final standings of the league classification tables. In the Greek Cup, they were eliminated at the first game of the second phase, when they were defeated by Ikaroi Serron, by a score of 64–60.

In the 2014–15 Greek A2 Basket League season, Lavrio finished in third place in the league. Because the club KAOD withdrew from the top-tier level Greek Basket League, Lavrio was then promoted up to the top professional national basketball league in Greece, for the first time in its history. Lavrio managed to secure their place in the league for the next season, one game before the end of the season, even though the team lost that game to Aries Trikala. The club finished the 2015–16 Greek League season in 11th place.

The club played in a European-wide competition for the first time in the 2018–19 season, as it competed in the first qualifying round of Europe's fourth-tier level competition, the FIBA Europe Cup. On September 20, 2018, Lavrio played its first European game, which resulted in an 82–73 victory over the Ukrainian SuperLeague club Dnipro. Lavrio made it to the finals of the 2020–21 Greek Basket League season, and thus qualified to play in the European-wide secondary competition, the FIBA Champions League, in the 2021–22 season.

== Arenas ==
Lavrio plays its domestic national home league games at the Lavrio Indoor Hall, which is located in Lavrio, Attica. The arena has a seating capacity of 1,700 people for basketball games. Lavrio plays its European-wide home league games at the Peace and Friendship Stadium, which is located in the Neo Faliro district of, Piraeus, Athens. The arena has a seating capacity of 12,000 people for basketball games.

== Sponsorship names ==
Due to sponsorship reasons, the club has known several names:

- Lavrio DHI: (2016–2017)
- Lavrio Megabolt: (2017–2018), (2019–present)
- Lavrio Aegean Cargo: (2018–2019)

== Titles and honors ==
=== Domestic competitions ===
- Greek League

Runners-up (1): 2020–21

- Greek 3rd Division

Winners (1): 2009–10

- Greek 4th Division

Winners (1st Group) (1) : 2006–07

== Season by season ==
Season	Tier	League	Pos.	W–L	Greek Cup	European competitions	
2010–11	2	A2 Basket League	4th	17–13	Phase 2 Round 2		
2011–12	2	A2 Basket League	8th	16–14	Phase 2 Round 2		
2012–13	2	A2 Basket League	5th	15–11	Phase 2 Round 2		
2013–14	2	A2 Basket League	10th	11–15	Phase 2 Round 2		
2014–15	2	A2 Basket League	3rd (Note: Lavrio was promoted to the Greek Basket League because KAOD withdrew from the league.)	18–8	Phase 2 Round 1		
2015–16	1	Basket League	11th	9–17	Phase 2 Round 2		
2016–17	1	Basket League	8th	11–17	Phase 2 Round 1		
2017–18	1	Basket League	6th	14–14	Phase 2 Round 2		
2018–19	1	Basket League	12th	7–19	Round of 16	4 FIBA Europe Cup	QR1
2019–20	1	Basket League	6th	11–9	Phase 2 Round 2		
2020–21	1	Basket League	2nd	23–10	Semifinals		
2021–22	1	Basket League	10th	8–16	Quarterfinals	2 FIBA Champions League	T24
2022–23	1	Basket League	9th	7–15			
2023–24	1	Basket League	11th	10–17			
2024–25	1	Basket League	12th	7–21			

== Logos ==
Primary club logo (2013–2017)

Megabolt sponsored logo (2017–present)

== Players ==
=== Current roster ===
Note: Flags indicate national team eligibility at FIBA-sanctioned events. Players may hold other non-FIBA nationalities not displayed.

Lavrio Megabolt roster
Players
Coaches

Pos.	No.	Nat.	Name	Ht.	Wt.	Age
SF		(Greece)	Tolias, Vasilis	1.98 m (6 ft 6 in)		24 – 30 October 2002
SG		(Greece)	Proiskos, Alexandros	1.98 m (6 ft 6 in)		26 – 12 January 2000
PG		(Greece)	Sigalas, Antonis	1.90 m (6 ft 3 in)		23 – 8 June 2003
PF		(Greece)	Kamateros, Tasos	2.04 m (6 ft 8 in)		26 – 19 May 2000
SF		(Greece)	Gerogas, Christos	1.97 m (6 ft 6 in)		19 – 17 March 2007
C		(Greece)	Mataliotakis, Manolis	2.02 m (6 ft 8 in)		32 – 14 January 1994
PG		(Greece)	Stasinos, Orfeas	1.83 m (6 ft 0 in)		27 – 5 September 1999
PF		(United States)	Anderson, Trey	2.01 m (6 ft 7 in)		27 – 3 November 1999
SG		(United States)	Leffew, Dakota	1.96 m (6 ft 5 in)		25 – 6 July 2001

Head coach

- (Greece) Savvas Symeonidis

Assistant coach(es)

- (Greece) Giannos Tzanis
- (Greece) Kostas Paschalis

Legend

- (C) Team captain
- Injured

- Roster
Updated: 5 July 2025

=== Notable players ===
Note: Flags indicate national team eligibility at FIBA-sanctioned events. Players may hold other non-FIBA nationalities not displayed.

Criteria

To appear in this section a player must have either:

- Set a club record or won an individual award while at the club
- Played at least one official international match for their national team at any time
- Played at least one official NBA match at any time.

- (Greece) Nikos Barlos
- (Greece) Vassilis Charalampopoulos
- (Greece) Sakis Giannakopoulos
- (Greece) Dimitris Kaklamanakis
- (Greece) Iosif Koloveros
- (Greece) Antonis Koniaris
- (Greece) Giannis Kouzeloglou
- (Greece) Michalis Lountzis
- (Greece) Vassilis Mouratos
- (Greece) Alexandros Nikolaidis
- (Greece) Michalis Perrakis
- (Greece) Vangelis Sakellariou
- (Greece) Christoforos Stefanidis
- (Greece) Theodoros Zaras
- (Bosnia and Herzegovina) Milan Milošević
- (Serbia) Marko Kešelj
- (Lithuania) Gilvydas Biruta
- (Guyana) Cyril Langevine
- (Netherlands) Jito Kok
- (The Gambia) (United States) Ousman Krubally
- (Nigeria) O. D. Anosike
- (Nigeria) Qudus Wahab
- (Puerto Rico) Tai Odiase
- (Senegal) Malik Dime
- (United Kingdom) Ashley Hamilton
- (United States) Kyle Allman Jr.
- (United States) Shizz Alston
- (United States) Demarius Bolds
- (United States) Tyson Carter
- (United States) R. J. Cole
- (United States) Glenn Cosey
- (United States) Devin Davis
- (United States) Alpha Diallo
- (United States) Quenton DeCosey
- (United States) David DeJulius
- (United States) Sean Evans
- (United States) Savion Flagg
- (United States) Steven Gray
- (United States) D. J. Johnson
- (United States) Doron Lamb
- (United States) McKenzie Moore
- (United States) Zamal Nixon
- (United States) (Serbia) Kevin Punter
- (United States) Jared Savage
- (United States) Jerry Smith
- (United States) Marcus Thornton
- (United States) Rashad Vaughn
- (United States) Glynn Watson Jr.
- (United States) Antwaine Wiggins
- (United States) Jeff Withey
- (United States) Brandon Young

== Head coaches ==
- (Greece) Christos Serelis: (2005–2022, 2022–2023)
