= Alexis Kyritsis =

Greek basketball player

Alexis Kyritsis Αλέξης Κυρίτσης
Panionios
- Position: Shooting guard / small forward
- League: Greek 3nd Division

Personal information
- Born: May 18, 1982 (age 44) Athens, Greece
- Listed height: 6 ft 6 in (1.98 m)
- Listed weight: 220 lb (100 kg)

Career information
- Playing career: 2000–present

Career history
- 2000–2003: Papagou
- 2003–2005: Aris
- 2005–2007: Maroussi
- 2007–2008: AEK
- 2008–2009: PAOK
- 2009–2010: Kavala
- 2010–2011: Ilysiakos
- 2011–2012: Panathinaikos
- 2012–2013: Ikaros Kallitheas
- 2013–2014: Panionios
- 2014–2015: Doxa Lefkadas
- 2015–2018: Doukas
- 2018–2019: Apollon Patras
- 2019–2020: Papagou
- 2020–2021: Psychiko

Career highlights
- 2× Greek Cup winner (2004, 2012); 4× Greek Second Division Top Scorer (2003, 2017, 2018, 2021)
Medals
Men's basketball
Representing Greece
Mediterranean Games
Silver medal – second place	2009 Pescara	Under-26

Alexandros "Alexis" Kyritsis (alternate spelling: Kiritsis) (Greek: Αλέξανδρος "Αλέξης" Κυρίτσης; born May 18, 1982) is a Greek professional basketball player. He is 1.98 m (6 ft 6 in) tall. He is a talented offensive combo guard-swingman.

== Professional career ==
In his professional career, Kyritsis played with some of the following clubs: Papagou, Aris, Maroussi, AEK Athens, PAOK, Kavala, Ilysiakos, Panathinaikos, Ikaros Kallitheas, Panionios, Doxa Lefkadas, and Doukas.

== National team career ==
Kyritsis won the silver medal at the 2009 Mediterranean Games, while playing with the Greek under-26 national team.

== Personal life ==
Kyritsis' father, Michalis, is a former professional basketball player and coach. Alexis and his father both played with Panathinaikos.

== Awards and accomplishments ==
=== Pro career ===
- 2× Greek Cup Winner: (2004, 2012)
- 3× Greek Second Division Top Scorer: (2003, 2017, 2018)

=== Greek junior national team ===
- 2009 Mediterranean Games: Silver
