= Donell Taylor =

American basketball player (born 1982)

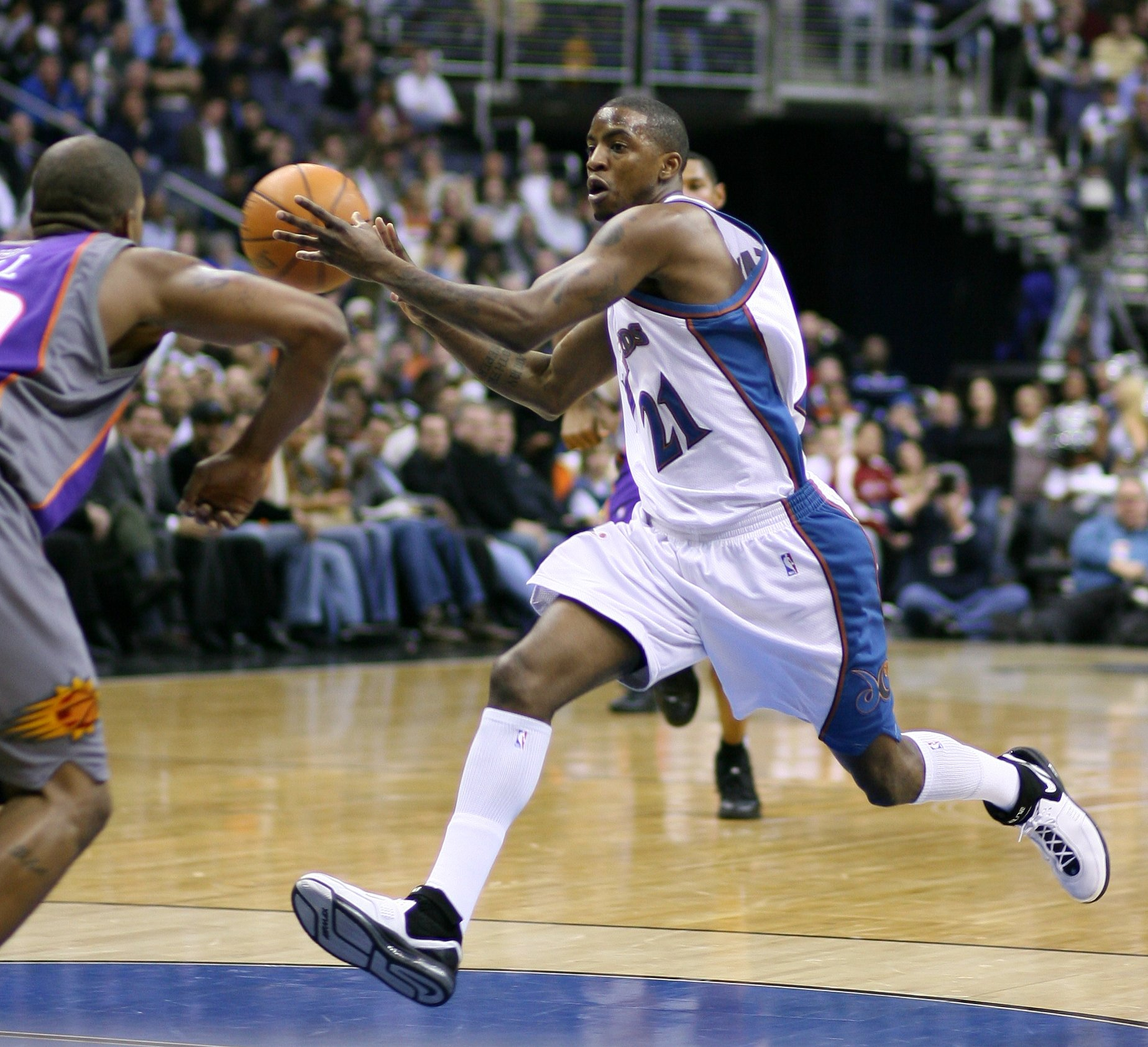
- Taylor in January 2007 with the Washington Wizards

Personal information
- Born: July 26, 1982 (age 44) Montgomery, Alabama, U.S.
- Listed height: 6 ft 6 in (1.98 m)
- Listed weight: 180 lb (82 kg)

Career information
- High school: Sidney Lanier (Montgomery, Alabama)
- College: Okaloosa-Walton CC (2001–2003); UAB (2003–2005)
- NBA draft: 2005: undrafted
- Playing career: 2005–2017
- Position: Shooting guard
- Number: 21

Career history
- 2005–2007: Washington Wizards
- 2007–2008: Maroussi
- 2008: Oostende
- 2008–2009: Aigaleo
- 2009: Erie BayHawks
- 2009–10: Idaho Stampede
- 2010: Trotamundos de Carabobo
- 2010–2011: Junior Casale
- 2011–2013: Reggiana
- 2013–2014: Reyer Venezia
- 2014: Reggiana
- 2014–2015: Maccabi Ashdod
- 2015–2016: Lukoil Academic
- 2016–2017: Agropoli

Career highlights
- LBA Top Scorer (2013); 2× Italian 2nd Division champion (2011, 2012)
- Stats at NBA.com
- Stats at Basketball Reference

Quence Donell Taylor II (born July 26, 1982) is an American former professional basketball player. He is 6 ft 6 in (198 cm) tall. He can play as a point guard or as a swingman, but his primary position is shooting guard.

== Early life and college career ==
Taylor was born and raised in Montgomery, Alabama. After leading Sidney Lanier High School of Montgomery, Alabama to the 2001 6A State Championship along with his identical twin brother, Ronell, Donell Taylor attended and played college basketball at Okaloosa-Walton Community College (now Northwest Florida State College) from 2001 to 2003, before transferring to the University of Alabama at Birmingham (UAB) to play for the UAB Blazers. He played alongside his twin brother Ronell Taylor at both Okaloosa-Walton Community College and at UAB.

== Professional career ==
=== Washington Wizards (2005–2007) ===
After the 2005 NBA draft, Taylor signed with the NBA's Washington Wizards as an undrafted free agent in August 2005. In two seasons (2005 to 2007) with the Wizards, Taylor played in a total of 98 NBA games, with one start per season. Taylor averaged 9.1 minutes per game, 2.7 points per game, and 0.9 rebounds per game in his rookie season, and 7.9 minutes per game, 2.7 points per game, and 1.0 rebounds per game in the 2006–07 season. The Wizards waived Taylor in October 2007, before the start of the regular season.

=== Maroussi and Telindus Oostende (2007–2008) ===
After leaving the Charlotte Bobcats, Taylor signed with the Greek Basket League team Maroussi, and played in 7 games with Maroussi, averaging 13.0 points per game, 3.1 rebounds per game, and 1.7 assists per game, in 30 minutes played per game in the Greek League. In March 2008, Taylor signed with Telindus Oostende of the Basketball League Belgium Division I. In three games played in the Belgian League, he averaged 3.0 points and 0.7 rebounds, in 9.3 minutes per game.

=== Aigaleo (2008–2009) ===
Returning to the NBA, Taylor played in the 2008–09 preseason with the Charlotte Bobcats, but he was released on October 14, 2008, before the regular season began. He signed with Aigaleo of the Greek Basket League in November 2008, and averaged 12.9 points per game, 4.2 rebounds per game, and 2.1 assists per game, in 20 games played in the Greek League.

=== Erie BayHawks and Idaho Stampede (2009–2010) ===
Starting the 2009–10 NBA season with the NBA Development League team Erie BayHawks, Taylor was traded to the Idaho Stampede on December 31, 2009. With Erie, Taylor averaged 18.7 points, 6.2 rebounds, 2.8 assists, and 1.4 steals; with Idaho, Taylor averaged 21.9 points, 7.2 rebounds, 4.8 assists, and 1.7 steals.

=== Fastweb Casale Monferrato (2010–2011) ===
On August 10, 2010, Taylor signed a contract with Fastweb Casale Monferrato of the Italian second-tier Legadue Basket. Taylor averaged 13.0 points per game, 4.0 rebounds per game, and 2.1 assists per game in the 2010–11 season of the Italian 2nd Division. Casale won the Legadue championship for the season.

=== Trenkwalder Reggio Emilia (2011–2013) ===
On August 1, 2011, Taylor signed with Pallacanestro Reggiana of the Italian 2nd Division. In his first season with the club, Taylor played in 28 games and averaged 17.1 points per game, 4.5 rebounds per game, and 1.8 assists per game in the Italian 2nd Division. The team moved up to Lega Basket Serie A, the first-tier Italian league, after winning the 2012 Legadue championship. In his second season with Reggio Emilia, Taylor averaged 18.6 points per game, 4.4 rebounds per game, and 2.3 assists per game in the top tier Italian League.

=== Umana Reyer Venezia (2013–2014) ===
In the summer of 2013, Taylor signed with Umana Reyer Venezia of the Italian First Division. In the Italian League, he averaged 14.4 points per game, 3.6 rebounds per game, and 2.2 assists per game.

=== Return to Reggio Emilia (2014) ===
On October 20, 2014, he returned to Reggio Emilia. On December 29, 2014, Taylor and Reggio Emilia parted ways. Taylor averaged 11.9 points, 3.9 rebounds and 1.7 assists in 10 games.
