= Georgios Tsiakos =

Greek professional basketball player (born 1982)

Mandraikos
- Position: Power forward / center

Personal information
- Born: July 19, 1982 (age 44) Cholargos, Greece
- Listed height: 6 ft 9 in (2.06 m)
- Listed weight: 240 lb (109 kg)

Career information
- NBA draft: 2004: undrafted
- Playing career: 2001–present

Career history
- 2001–2004: Maroussi
- 2004–2005: Near East
- 2005–2006: Kolossos Rodou
- 2006–2007: A.E.L. 1964
- 2007: Inca
- 2007–2008: PAOK
- 2008: BK Ventspils
- 2008–2009: Kavala
- 2009–2011: Peristeri
- 2011–2012: Ilysiakos
- 2012–2013: Panelefsiniakos
- 2013–2015: AEK Athens
- 2015–2016: Panionios
- 2016–2017: Holargos
- 2017–2018: Dafni
- 2018–2019: Koroivos
- 2019–present: Mandraikos

Career highlights
- Greek 2nd Division champion (2014)
Medals
Men's basketball
Representing Greece
FIBA Europe Under-20 Championship
Gold medal – first place	2002 Lithuania	Under-20
Mediterranean Games
Silver medal – second place	2005 Spain	Under-26

Georgios "George" Tsiakos (alternate spelling: Giorgos) (Greek: Γιώργος Τσιάκος; born July 19, 1982) is a Greek professional basketball player. He is a 2.06 m (6 ft 9 in) tall power forward-center.

== Professional career ==
Tsiakos won the Greek 2nd Division championship in 2014, with AEK Athens.

== National team career ==
Tsiakos was a member of the junior national teams of Greece. With Greece's junior national team, he played at the 2002 FIBA Europe Under-20 Championship, where he won a gold medal. With Greece's under-26 national team, he won the silver medal at the 2005 Mediterranean Games.
