= Akis Kallinikidis =

Greek basketball player

AEK Athens
- Position: Assistant team manager
- League: GBL

Personal information
- Born: September 8, 1977 (age 49) Athens, Greece
- Listed height: 6 ft 5.75 in (1.97 m)
- Listed weight: 210 lb (95 kg)

Career information
- Playing career: 1995–2024

Career history
- 1995: Panellinios
- 1995–1996: Tifonas
- 1996–1999: Aigaleo
- 1999: Aura Basket
- 1999–2009: Aigaleo
- 2009–2011: AEK Athens
- 2011–2014: Rethymno Aegean
- 2014–2016: Arkadikos
- 2016–2017: Holargos
- 2017–2019: Aigaleo
- 2019–2021: Oiakas Nafpliou
- 2021–2024: Neaniki Estia Megaridas

Avraam "Akis" Kallinikidis (born 1977, in Greece) is a Greek former professional basketball player. He is 1.97 m (6 ft 5 3/4 in) tall. He can play at both the small forward and power forward positions.

== Professional career ==
Kallinikidis began his professional career with Aigaleo. After playing with Egaleo for 13 years, he moved to AEK Athens in 2009. In 2014, he signed with Arkadikos. In 2016, he joined Holargos of the Greek A2 League.

On April 27, 2024, Kallinikidis announced his retirement at the age of 46, after being a pro for 29 years.

== Executive career ==
On July 19, 2024, Kallinikidis began a career working as a basketball executive, when he became the team manager of Mykonos.

On Hult 25, 2025, he moved to AEK Athens as an assistant team manager.
