= Dimitrios Lolas =

Greek basketball player

Dimitrios Lolas Δημήτριος Λόλας
Niki Volos
- Position: Power forward / center
- League: Greek 3rd division

Personal information
- Born: January 31, 1986 (age 40) Larissa, Greece
- Listed height: 6 ft 8 in (2.03 m)
- Listed weight: 240 lb (109 kg)

Career information
- Playing career: 2003–present

Career history
- 2003–2007: Maroussi
- 2007–2008: Aigaleo
- 2008–2009: Kavala
- 2009–2010: Dafni
- 2010–2011: Pagrati
- 2011–2013: Amyntas
- 2013–2014: Ionikos Nikaias
- 2014–2016: Kymis
- 2016–2017: Iraklio
- 2017–2020: Larisa
- 2020–present: Niki Volos
Medals
Men's basketball
Representing Greece
Mediterranean Games
Silver medal – second place	2009 Italy	Under-26

Dimitrios Lolas (alternate spelling: Dimitris) (Greek: Δημήτριος Λόλας; born January 31, 1986) is a Greek professional basketball player for Niki Volos of the Greek 3rd division. At a height of 6'8" (2.03 m), he can play at both the power forward and center positions.

== Professional career ==
Lolas began his pro career in Greece's top-tier level Greek Basket League, with Maroussi. He also played in the Greek Basket League with Aigaleo and Kavala.

== National team career ==
Lolas was a member of the junior national teams of Greece. With Greece's junior national teams, he played at the following tournaments: the 2004 FIBA Under-18 European Championship, the 2005 FIBA Under-20 European Championship, and the 2006 FIBA Under-20 European Championship. He also won a silver medal at the 2009 Mediterranean Games, while playing with the Greek under-26 national team.
