= Ioannis Gagaloudis =

Greek basketball player

Ioannis Gagaloudis Γιάννης Γκαγκαλούδης
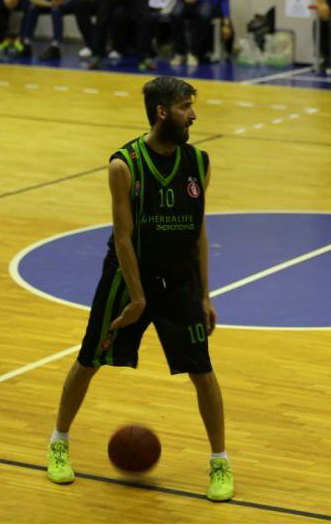
- Gagaloudis, in 2016.

Esperos Kallitheas
- Position: Point guard / shooting guard
- League: Greek B Basket League

Personal information
- Born: August 22, 1978 (age 48) Kypseli, Athens, Greece
- Listed height: 6 ft 3.75 in (1.92 m)
- Listed weight: 190 lb (86 kg)

Career information
- Playing career: 1998–present

Career history
- 1998–1999: Palaio Faliro
- 1999–2001: Dafni
- 2001–2003: Aris
- 2003–2004: Panathinaikos
- 2004–2006: PAOK
- 2006–2007: AEK Athens
- 2007–2008: Rethymno
- 2008: Virtus Roma
- 2008–2009: Kavala
- 2009–2010: Olympias Patras
- 2010–2012: Maroussi
- 2012: Apollon Limassol
- 2012–2013: Kavala
- 2013: Étoile Sportive du Sahel
- 2013–2014: Ikaros Chalkidas
- 2014–2016: Livadeia
- 2016–2018: Iraklis Thessaloniki
- 2018–2019: Aigaleo
- 2019–2022: Maroussi
- 2022–present: Esperos

Career highlights
- FIBA EuroCup Challenge champion (2003); Greek League champion (2004); Greek League All-Star (2006); Tunisian League champion (2013); Tunisian Cup winner (2013); Greek 2nd Division MVP (2015); Greek Second Division Top Scorer (2016)

Ioannis "Gaga" Gagaloudis (alternate spellings: Yannis, Giannis, Gagaloudes, Gkagkaloudis) (Greek: Γιάννης Γκαγκαλούδης; born August 22, 1978) is a Greek professional basketball player for Esperos Kallitheas B.C. of the Greek B Basket League. He is 1.92 m (6 ft 3 3/4 in) tall and 86 kg (190 lbs.) in weight. Born in Athens, Greece, he can play at both the point guard and shooting guard positions.

== Professional career ==
=== Greece ===
Born in Kypseli, Athens in 1978, Gagaloudis started his career with Palaio Faliro. In 1999, he moved to the Greek top-tier level GBL team Dafni, where he stayed for two seasons. Gagaloudis won the 2003 FIBA EuroCup Challenge with Aris, and a Greek Basket League championship with Panathinaikos, in 2004.

With PAOK, Gagaloudis averaged 12.9 points, 1.6 rebounds, 3.2 assists, and 1.8 steals per game, in the 2nd-tier level European-wide league, the EuroCup, during the 2004–05 season. After 2 years with PAOK, and following contract offers from Italian and Spanish teams, Gagaloudis signed with Greek club AEK Athens, in October 2006. In August 2007, Gagaloudis was the first signing of the Greek club Rethymno, for the club's first season in the Greek Basket League.

=== Italy ===
In January 2008, Gagaloudis signed with the Italian team Virtus Roma, but he was released a month later, after appearing in only three Italian League games, in which he averaged 4.0 points per game. He also played in 2 EuroLeague games with Roma that season.

=== Cyprus ===
In February 2012, Gagaloudis left Maroussi, due to the club's financial problems. For financial reasons, Gagaloudis then signed with the Cypriot League team Apollon Limassol.

=== Back to Greece ===
After the conclusion of the season in Cyprus, Gagaloudis signed with the Greek club Kavala, for a second time in his career, in order to play for the team in the Greek League 2012–13 season.

=== Tunisia ===
In January 2013, Gagaloudis accepted an offer from the Tunisian club Étoile Sportive du Sahel, of the Tunisian Division I League. He helped his team win both the Tunisian League and the Tunisian Cup.

=== Back to Greece again ===
Gagaloudis signed with Livadeia, of the Greek Second Division, in November 2014. He was named the Greek 2nd division's MVP in 2015, as he averaged 21.4 points, 2.8 rebounds, 6.9 assists, and 1.8 steals per game during the season. In June 2015, he renewed his contract with Livadeia, for the next season. In that next season, Gagaloudis was the leading scorer of the Greek 2nd-tier league, and he led his team in scoring, assists, steals, and three-pointers made, as he averaged 22.6 points, 3.4 rebounds, 6.2 assists, and 1.9 steals per game. Despite his good performance, Gagaloudis' contract was terminated by mutual consent, on 18 April 2016. According to a Greek sports website, his contract was terminated because Gagaloudis had congratulated one of his opponents, Georgios Apostolidis, for his scoring a buzzer-beating game-winner against Gagaloudis' team, Livadeia.

On 19 July 2016, Gagaloudis signed with Iraklis Thessaloniki of the Greek A2 League (Greek 2nd division).

On 28 January 2022, Gagaloudis signed with Esperos Kallitheas B.C. of the Greek B Basket League.

== Awards and accomplishments ==
- FIBA EuroCup Challenge Champion: (2003)
- Greek League Champion: (2004)
- Greek League All-Star: (2006)
- Tunisian Cup Winner: (2013)
- Tunisian League Champion: (2013)
- Greek 2nd Division MVP: (2015)
- Greek 2nd Division Top Scorer: (2016)
