= William Phillips (basketball) =

French-American basketball player

Personal information
- Born: March 18, 1979 (age 47) Nice, France
- Listed height: 6 ft 10 in (2.08 m)
- Listed weight: 243 lb (110 kg)

Career information
- College: William & Mary (1997–1998); Saint Joseph's (1999–2002)
- NBA draft: 2002: undrafted
- Playing career: 2002–2009
- Position: Power forward

Career history
- 2002: Maroussi BC
- 2002–2003: Tau Cerámica
- 2003: CB Granada
- 2003–2005: Paris Basket Racing
- 2005–2006: Basket Livorno
- 2006–2007: Plus Pujol Lleida
- 2007–2008: Giessen 46ers
- 2008–2009: CB Breogan
- 2009: Pistoia

William Warren "Bill" Phillips (born March 18, 1979) is a French-American former basketball player. He is the son of William and Dominique Phillips, who both played professional basketball in France. His mother is French, while his father is American. He played as a power forward.
