= Sotiris Manolopoulos =

Greek basketball player and coach

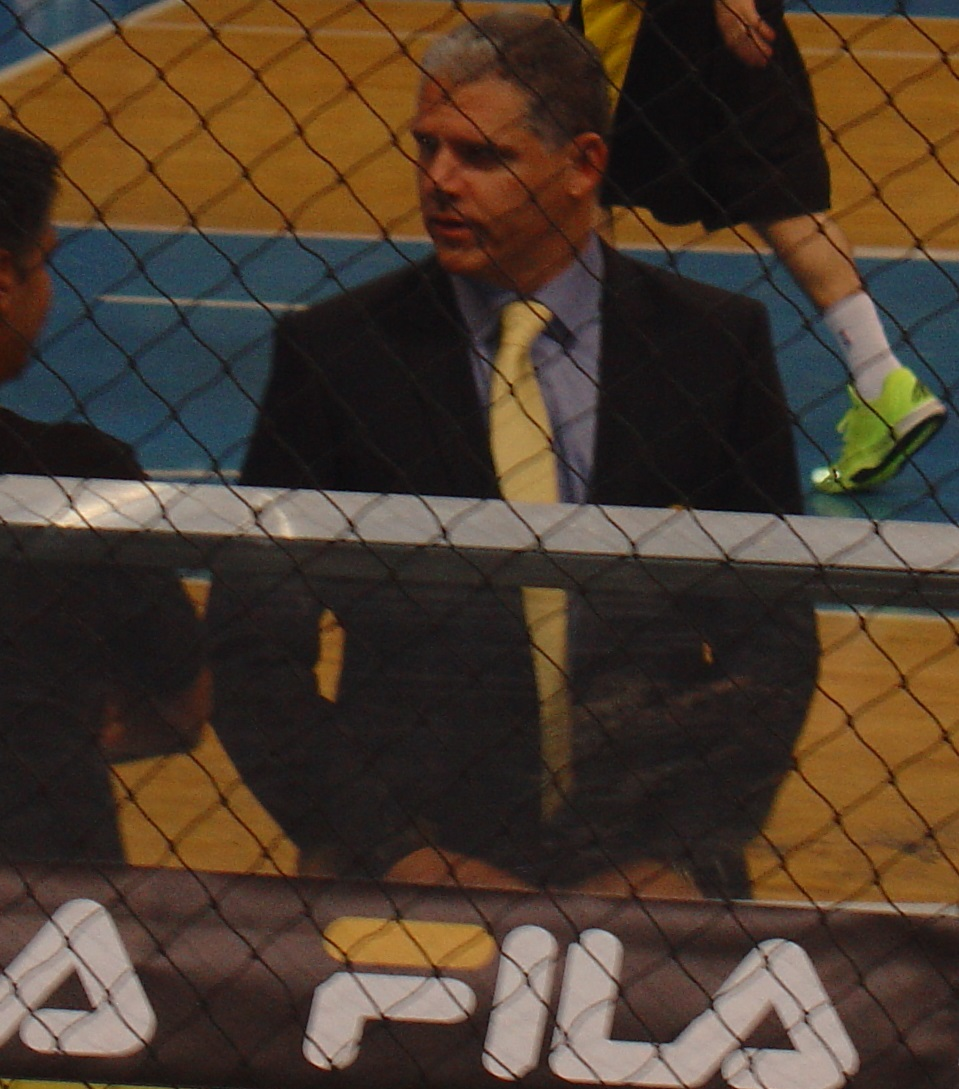
- Manolopoulos with AEK Athens in 2015

Iran
- Title: Head coach

Personal information
- Born: June 27, 1970 (age 56) Athens, Greece
- Listed height: 6 ft 3.75 in (1.92 m)

Career information
- College: Boston University (1989–1993)
- NBA draft: 1993: undrafted
- Playing career: 1993–2004
- Position: Point guard / shooting guard
- Coaching career: 2004–present

Career history

Playing
- 1993–1997: Papagou
- 1997–2003: Maroussi
- 2003–2004: Doukas

Coaching
- 2004–2005: Peristeri (assistant)
- 2005–2006: Makedonikos (assistant)
- 2006–2011: Maroussi (assistant)
- 2011–2012: Aris (assistant)
- 2012–2015: Panathinaikos (assistant)
- 2015: Panathinaikos
- 2015–2017: AEK Athens (assistant)
- 2017: AEK Athens
- 2018–2020: Ifaistos Limnou
- 2021: Peristeri
- 2021: Greece (assistant)
- 2022–2024: Dinamo București
- 2024–present: Iran

Career highlights
- As player: FIBA Saporta Cup champion (2001); As assistant coach: 2× Greek League champion (2013, 2014); 3× Greek Cup winner (2013–2015)
Medals
Head Coach for Iran
FIBA Asia Cup
Bronze medal – third place	2025 Jeddah
Asian Games
Bronze medal – third place	2026 Aichi–Nagoya

Sotirios Alex Manolopoulos (Greek: Σωτήρης Μανωλόπουλος; born June 27, 1970) is a Greek retired professional basketball player and current basketball head coach, who is the head coach of the Iran men's national basketball team. Born in Athens, he played college basketball at Boston University. After graduating, he returned to his native Greece, to play professional basketball. He had served as an assistant coach in several teams in the Greek Basket League, before he was appointed the head coach of Panathinaikos in May 2015.

== Playing career ==
=== College career ===
Manolopoulos played college basketball at Boston University, with the Boston University Terriers. He was twice named to the America East Academic Honor Roll (1992, 1993). He appeared in 58 games for the Terriers, from 1989 to 1993, averaging 3.6 points, 1.1 rebounds, and 0.7 steals per game.

=== Professional career ===
Manolopoulos played professionally with Papagou, Maroussi, and Doukas. While playing with Maroussi, he won the FIBA Saporta Cup 2000–01 season championship.

== Coaching career ==
Manolopoulos started his coaching career as an assistant coach with Peristeri, in 2004. In the 2005–06 season, he was appointed the assistant coach of Makedonikos. He moved to Maroussi for the next season, with whom he stayed until 2011. He was named Aris' assistant coach in 2011. He was given the assistant coach job of Panathinaikos, in 2012. On May 4, 2015 he was appointed as Panathinaikos' head coach, after the removal of Duško Ivanović from the position.

On 22 October 2015, he was appointed as an assistant coach for AEK Athens. On 18 December 2015, he was appointed as the head coach of AEK Athens, after the removal of Dragan Šakota from that same position, so that he could become the general manager of the team. On March 21, 2017, after the departure of head coach Jure Zdovc from the club, Manolopoulos became the new head coach of the club, after signing a contract with them, through the year 2018.

== Honors and titles ==
=== Playing career ===
- FIBA Saporta Cup Champion:
  - 2001
