= Maroussi B.C. =

Maroussi
- Nickname: Λύκοι (The wolves)
- Leagues: Greek Basketball League
- Founded: 1896; 130 years ago
- History: Maroussi B.C. 1950–present
- Arena: Maroussi Saint Thomas Indoor Hall
- Capacity: 1,700
- Location: Marousi, Athens, Greece
- Team colors: Yellow and Black
- President: Konstantinos Koutsoukos
- Head coach: Ilias Papatheodorou
- Team captain: Orfeas Stasinos
- Ownership: Dimosthenis Stasinopoulos
- Championships: 1 Saporta Cup; 1 Greek 2nd Division; 1 Greek 3rd Division
- Website: maroussibasketball.gr
Home	Away

Maroussi B.C. (Greek: K.A.E. Μαρούσι) alternately translated as Marousi, Amaroussio, or Amaroussion, is a professional basketball club that is based in Maroussi, a northern suburb of Athens, Greece. The club's full name is Gymnastikos Syllogos Maroussi Basketball Club, which is commonly abbreviated as G.S. Maroussi B.C.. The club currently competes in the top-tier Greek Basketball League (GBL).

== History ==
=== 1950–1998 ===
The multi-sports club Gymnastikos Syllogos Amarousiou (Amarousi Sports Club) was founded in 1896, the same year that Maroussi native Spyridon Louis won the Olympic marathon at the 1896 Summer Olympics. The club's men's basketball section started in 1950.

The basketball section played in the Greek minor leagues for the first two decades of its existence. It reached the Greek top division, the A National Category (Alpha League) in 1969, where it played for one season before being relegated.

In the 1970s, the club was led by Nikos Darivas at point guard and Dimitris Fosses at center, and starting with the 1971–72 season, the club played in the Greek top division for all but one year of the following decade. Maroussi qualified for the European third-tier level FIBA Korać Cup's 1978–79 season.

The club was then relegated after the 1980–81 season, and alternated between the second-tier level A2 League and the third-tier level B League for the next 18 years.

=== 1998–2010 ===
Maroussi was promoted back up to the Greek First Division for the 1998–99 season, and moved from the Spiros Louis Gym to the newly constructed Maroussi Saint Thomas Indoor Hall.

Maroussi won the title of the European second-tier level FIBA Saporta Cup, during the 2000–01 season. That team was coached by Vangelis Alexandris, and it featured the inside-outside scoring tandem of Jimmy Oliver and Ashraf Amaya, as well as the rebounding skills of Vassil Evtimov. Maroussi became the sixth Greek team to win a European continental-wide title.

The club at this time received financial backing from Greek businessman Aris Vovos.

The club then played in the second-tier level FIBA Saporta Cup, and its successor, the EuroCup, the third-tier level FIBA Korać Cup, and the fourth-tier level FIBA Europe Champions Cup. Maroussi reached the final of the third-tier level FIBA Europe League's (later called FIBA EuroChallenge) 2003–04 season, but they lost in the final to the Russian club UNICS Kazan. In the Greek Cup, Maroussi reached the Greek Cup Final Four in the 1999–00 season and the Greek Cup Final in the 2001–02 season.

Under the club's head coach at the time, Panagiotis Giannakis, and with the young star play-maker of the club at the time, Vassilis Spanoulis (recipient of the Greek League Best Young Player and Greek League Most Improved Player awards in 2003 and 2004), the club finished in second place in the 2003–04 regular season, with a 21–5 record. It then beat Peristeri and AEK Athens, which had been the league's runner-up the preceding year, and the league's champions the year before that, in the playoffs, before ultimately losing in the Greek League Finals to Panathinaikos.

In the 2004–05 season, the club was second in the Greek League regular season again, and finished fourth in the league overall, after postseason losses to AEK Athens in the semifinals, and Panionios in the 3rd place playoff series.

Spanoulis then moved to Panathinaikos in the summer of 2005. In the 2005–06 season, Maroussi finished the regular season in third place, behind Panathinaikos and Olympiacos, and was subsequently defeated Olympiacos in the playoff semifinals. Maroussi then lost the 3rd place playoff series against Aris. In that season's Greek Cup, they were beaten in the Greek Cup Final.

Coach Giannakis then left Maroussi in 2006, to concentrate on managing the senior men's Greek national basketball team. In the following 2006–07 season, the Maroussi side finished the regular season in 8th place, and reached the first round of the playoffs, where they lost to Panathinaikos.

In the 2007–08 season, Soulis Markopoulos joined the team as its new head coach, and Maroussi finished in 6th place in the regular season. In the playoffs, Maroussi beat Aris in the first round, and then took Olympiacos to a 5th and deciding game in the semi-finals, which Maroussi lost by just one point (64–63). The team then lost the 3rd place playoff series to Panionios.

Under head coach Markopoulos (who was Greek League Coach of the Year in 2008), Maroussi finished in 4th place in the Greek Basket League 2008–09 regular season. They then beat Panellinios in the first round of the playoffs, before losing to Olympiacos in the playoff semifinals. However, they won the 3rd place playoff series against Aris, and thus qualified for the European top-tier level EuroLeague.

In 2010, Markopoulos left Maroussi for PAOK, and he and was replaced as the team's head coach by Georgios Bartzokas, a former Maroussi player.

Maroussi beat fellow Greek League club Aris, and the German League club Alba Berlin, in the EuroLeague 2009–10 season's Qualifying Round, to reach the regular season group stage of the competition. In the EuroLeague's Group C, they beat the Israeli League club Maccabi Tel Aviv at home, and reached the EuroLeague Top 16 Phase, where they beat fellow Greek club Panathinaikos and the Adriatic League club Partizan Belgrade, while playing home games at the Nikos Galis Olympic Indoor Hall.

In the 2009–10 season, Maroussi finished the regular season in third place. They then beat Kolossos in the first round of the playoffs, but they were then beaten in the semi-final of the playoffs by Olympiacos. In the 3rd place playoff series, they beat Panellinios, to again qualify for the next season of the EuroLeague.

Maroussi player Kostas Kaimakoglou was selected to the Greek League Best Five team, and Georgios Bartzokas became the third Maroussi head coach in five years to receive the Greek League's Best Coach award.

=== The club's decline ===
Club President Aris Vovos left the club during the 2010 off-season, leaving a big gap in the club's finances. After a consortium led by Giorgos Gamaris and Thanasis Maris, failed to gain control of the club, its ownership reverted to the club's amateur section in October.

The team was then only allowed to be registered to the top-tier level Greek Basket League's 2010–11 season on appeal. The players' union criticized the club for late salary payments. The EuroLeague revoked the club's licence to play in the Qualifying Rounds of the competition. The former Panathinaikos club football player Vasilis Konstantinou, a Marousi native who had played youth basketball with the team, was named team president in October. Head coach Vangelis Alexandris returned to replace the departing Bartzokas, whilst experienced players such as Nestoras Kommatos, Ioannis Gagaloudis, and Dimitrios Charitopoulos were brought into the team to form a new squad following a player exodus. Maroussi finished the 2010–11 season in 5th place in the regular season standings. They lost in the first round of the playoffs to Aris. By finishing in the top 5 in the Greek League, they qualified for the next season's edition of the European 2nd-tier level EuroCup, but they were not permitted to participate in the competition, due to financial issues.

In May 2011, Maroussi was ordered by FIBA's Basketball Arbitral Tribunal (BAT) to pay thousands of euros to former player Jared Homan in unpaid salaries and bonuses. Maroussi was unable to pay Homan, or Georgios Diamantopoulos, who won a similar ruling against the club in August of that year. Due to this, the club was then banned by FIBA from being able to register any new players in the Greek League, in November 2011. A temporary financial agreement with Homan, led to the suspension of the ban on registering any new players for one day, during which Frank Elegar was recruited to the club.

Nikos Linardos became the team's new head coach for the 2011–12 season, which began with a long losing streak, despite Maroussi player Nestoras Kommatos being one of the league's top scorers, and Maroussi player Ioannis Gagaloudis being one of the league's assists leaders.

The team's financial crisis deepened. Gagaloudis, Kommatos, Charitopoulos, and Elegar all left the club, due to unpaid salaries. Teenagers from the club's youth team, such as Dimitrios Agravanis and Lampros Tsontzos, were then moved into the team's starting five for Greek League games. The club was also prohibited from selling any tickets to home games, due to unpaid taxes, and it ceased paying its players and training staff. Maroussi finished the 2011–12 season with a 1–23 regular season record, winning their only game of the season against Peristeri, another team that was suffering from financial problems at the time.

Due to going into bankruptcy, the club was then demoted to the third-tier level semi-professional competition, the Greek B League, for the 2012–13 season. The club was then demoted to the fourth-tier level Greek C League, for the 2015–16 season.

For the 2016–17 season, the club was promoted up to the Greek B League. Then, for the 2017–18 season, the club was promoted up to the second-tier level Greek A2 League. In the 2019–20 season, the club played in the Greek 3rd Division, and in the 2020–21 season, the club played in the Greek 2nd Division.

== Arenas ==
Maroussi plays its national domestic home games at the 1,700 seat capacity Maroussi Saint Thomas Indoor Hall, which is leased to the club by the municipality of Marousi. The club played its EuroLeague home games in Panathinaikos BC Arena which is Nikos Galis Olympic Indoor Hall.

== Honours and titles ==
=== Domestic competitions ===
- Greek 2nd Division
  - Winners (1): 2022–23

=== International competitions ===
- FIBA Saporta Cup
  - Winners (1): 2001
- FIBA EuroChallenge
  - Runners-up (1): 2004

== Current roster ==
Note: Flags indicate national team eligibility at FIBA-sanctioned events. Players may hold other non-FIBA nationalities not displayed.

Maroussi B.C. roster
Players
Coaches

Pos.	No.	Nat.	Name	Ht.	Wt.	Age
G	1	(United States)	Walker, Jordan	1.80 m (5 ft 11 in)	77 kg (170 lb)	27 – 11 August 1999
G	2	(United States)	Jackson, Zeb	1.95 m (6 ft 5 in)	84 kg (185 lb)	25 – 14 November 2001
G/F	3	(United States)	Drechsel, Trey	1.98 m (6 ft 6 in)	93 kg (205 lb)	30 – 27 July 1996
PG	6	(Greece)	Koniaris, Antonis	1.93 m (6 ft 4 in)	86 kg (190 lb)	29 – 30 September 1997
F/C	7	(Belarus)	Salash, Maksim	2.08 m (6 ft 10 in)	100 kg (220 lb)	30 – 6 May 1996
PF	9	(Greece)	Touliatos, Nikos	2.03 m (6 ft 8 in)	95 kg (209 lb)	21 – 28 September 2005
C	11	(United States)	Ware, Lance	2.06 m (6 ft 9 in)	107 kg (236 lb)	25 – 8 February 2001
PF	12	(South Sudan)	Kuany, Kuany	2.06 m (6 ft 9 in)	91 kg (201 lb)	26 – 27 March 2000
PF	14	(Greece)	Kaselakis, Leonidas	2.03 m (6 ft 8 in)	113 kg (249 lb)	36 – 6 January 1990
PG	15	(Greece)	Komnianidis, Giannis	1.86 m (6 ft 1 in)	80 kg (176 lb)	20 – 2 August 2006
PF	20	(United States)	Uthoff, Jarrod	2.06 m (6 ft 9 in)	100 kg (220 lb)	33 – 19 May 1993
G/F	23	(Greece)	Iordanou, Christos	1.96 m (6 ft 5 in)	86 kg (190 lb)	27 – 23 November 1998
G	27	(Greece)	Lountzis, Michalis	1.98 m (6 ft 6 in)	91 kg (201 lb)	28 – 4 August 1998
C	29	(Angola)	De Sousa, Silvio	2.06 m (6 ft 9 in)	113 kg (249 lb)	28 – 6 October 1998

Head coach

- (Greece) Ilias Papatheodorou

Assistant coach(es)

- (Greece) Dimitris Menoudakos
- (Greece) Thanos Nousis
- (Greece) Giorgos Katsarelias

Legend

- (C) Team captain
- Injured

- Roster

=== Depth chart ===
Pos.	Starting 5	Bench 1	Bench 2	Bench 3
C	Silvio De Sousa	Lance Ware
PF	Maksim Salash	Jarrod Uthoff	Kuany Kuany	Nikos Touliatos
SF	Trey Drechsel	Leonidas Kaselakis
SG	Michalis Lountzis	Zeb Jackson		Christos Iordanou
PG	Jordan Walker	Antonis Koniaris	Giannis Komnianidis

== Seasons ==
Season	Greek League	Greek Cup	Europe	Head Coach	Roster
1998–99	7th place	Round of 16	_	Kostas Petropoulos	Andy Toolson, Henry Turner, Erik Meek, Junior Burrough, Craig Robinson, Jon Korfas, Pete Papachronis, Alexis Falekas, Nikos Kasuridis, Sotiris Manolopoulos, Vangelis Logothetis, Panagiotis Panagiotarakos, Spyros Panteliadis, Charis Charalampidis, Alexis Karatzas, Pete Pangas
1999–00	10th place	3rd	Korać Cup; Quarter finals	Vangelis Alexandris	Ashraf Amaya, Henry Turner, Jon Korfas, Pete Papachronis, Vangelis Logothetis, Alexis Falekas, Anatoly Zourpenko, Sotiris Manolopoulos, Panagiotis Panagiotarakos, Spyros Panteliadis, Dimitris Karaplis, Kostas Anagnostou, Charis Charalampidis, Kostantinos Tsevas
2000–01	7th place	Quarter-finals	Saporta Cup; Winner	Vangelis Alexandris	Ashraf Amaya, Jimmy Oliver, Vangelis Vourtzoumis, Vasco Evtimov, Alexis Falekas, Giorgos Maslarinos, Sotiris Nikolaidis, Dimitris Karaplis, Vangelis Logothetis, Sotiris Manolopoulos, Dimitris Marmarinos, Kostas Anagnostu, Charis Charalampidis, Panagiotis Stavropoulos, Kostantinos Tsevas
2001–02	7th place	Finalist	Korać Cup; Semi finals	Nikos Linardos, Kostas Petropoulos	Ashraf Amaya, Jimmy Oliver, Pat Burke, Michael Koch, Vassilis Spanoulis, Angelos Koronios, Marty Conlon, Dickey Simpkins, Alexis Falekas, Sotiris Manolopoulos, Dimitris Marmarinos, Giorgos Maslarinos, Sotiris Nikolaidis, Kostas Anagnostou, Stavros Daniil, Giorgos Pavlidis, Kostantinos Tsevas, Giorgos Tsiakos
2002–03	6th place	Round of 16	FIBA Europe Champions Cup; Round of 64	Panagiotis Giannakis	Jimmy Oliver, Kenyon Jones, Norman Nolan, Vassilis Spanoulis, Angelos Koronios, Giorgos Maslarinos, Samo Grum, Sotiris Manolopoulos, Dimitris Marmarinos, Giorgos Tsiakos, Nikos Liakopoulos, Stavros Daniil, Bill Phillips, Panagiotis Stavropoulos
2003–04	Finalist	Round of 16	FIBA Europe League; Finalist	Panagiotis Giannakis	Andre Hutson, Roderick Blakney, Vassilis Spanoulis, Giorgos Karagkoutis, Ivan Grgat, Oliver Popović, Aleksandar Smiljanić, Lazaros Agadakos, Makis Nikolaidis, Giorgos Tsiakos, Stavros Daniil, Kostas Gagaudakis, Dimitris Lolas, Nikos Moutoupas, Angelos Siamandouras, Dimitris Giannakis
2004–05	4th place	Quarter-finals	ULEB Cup; Quarter finals	Panagiotis Giannakis	Vassilis Spanoulis, Roderick Blakney, Blagota Sekulić, Larry Stewart, Giorgos Karagkoutis, Nikos Boudouris, Kenyon Jones, Oliver Popović, Aleksandar Smiljanic, Kostas Kaimakoglou, Markos Kolokas, Christoforos Stefanidis, Dimitris Lolas, Petros Noeas
2005–06	4th place	Finalist	FIBA EuroCup; Quarter Finals	Panagiotis Giannakis	Roderick Blakney, Alexis Kiritsis, Blagota Sekulić, Jared Homan, Giorgos Karagkoutis, Nikos Boudouris, Kostas Kaimakoglou, Markos Kolokas, Dimitris Lolas, Sotiris Nikolaidis, Petros Noeas, Christoforos Stefanidis, Dimitris Despos, Vassilis Giannoulakos
2006–07	8th place	Semi-finals	FIBA EuroCup; Second Round	Darko Russo	Alexis Kiritsis, Renaldas Seibutis, Danya Abrams, Chris Thomas, Kostas Charalampidis, Ermin Jazvin, Vassilis Giannoulakos, Kostas Kaimakoglou, Markos Kolokas, Petros Noeas, Philippos Simeonidis, Christoforos Stefanidis, Giorgos Karagkoutis, Mark Dickel, Alexandros Melniks, Dimitris Lolas, Theodoros Tsiotras
2007–08	4th place	Round of 16	FIBA EuroCup; Elimination Round 2	Soulis Markopoulos	Branko Milisavljević, Jarod Stevenson, Kostas Charalampidis, Kostas Kaimakoglou, Donell Taylor, Jason Parker, Nikos Boudouris, Andreas Glyniadakis, Bojan Bakić, Ermin Jazvin, Feliks Kojadinović, Dimitris Mavroeidis, Christoforos Stefanidis, Petros Noeas, Travon Bryant, Nondas Papantoniou, Michalis Paragyios, Stavros Toutziarakis
2008–09	3rd place	Semi-finals	Eurocup Basketball; Last 16	Soulis Markopoulos	Billy Keys, Jarod Stevenson, Giorgos Diamantopoulos, Loukas Mavrokefalidis, Andreas Glyniadakis, Pat Calathes, Kostas Charalampidis, Dimitris Mavroeidis, Fanis Koumpouras, Christoforos Stefanidis, Stavros Toutziarakis, Nondas Papantoniou, Shawn Huff, Petros Noeas, Kostas Kaimakoglou
2009–10	3rd place	Quarter-finals	Euroleague; Top 16	Georgios Bartzokas	Billy Keys, Jared Homan, Giorgos Diamantopoulos, Stephen Arigbabu, Levon Kendall, Pat Calathes, Jamon Gordon, Dimitris Mavroeidis, Fanis Koumpouras, Konstaninos Papantonakos, Michalis Pelekanos, Marios Batis, Stefanos Moreau Christos Lakkas, Kostas Kaimakoglou, Stevan Nađfeji, Igor Milošević
2010–11	5th place	Withdrew	Euroleague; Revoked	Vangelis Alexandris	Dimitris Charitopoulos, Ioannis Gagaloudis, Eugene Akepsimaidis, Feliks Kojadinović, David Huertas, Dalibor Bagarić, Petros Noeas, Nestoras Kommatos, Angelos Siamandouras, Denis Clemente, Aleksandar Bojić, Giannis Vavatsikos, Tony Weeden, Eddie Basden, Lazaros Seferidis, Lampros Tsontzos, Curtis Sumpter, Lance Allred, Dimitris Agravanis
2011–12	13th place (relegated to B League)	Quarter-finals		Nikos Linardos	Lefteris Akepsemaidis, Ioannis Demertzis, Makis Nikolaidis, Lampros Tsontzos, Vangelis Sakellariou, Ioannis Gagaloudis, Nestoras Kommatos, Dimitris Agravanis, Phil Kalogiannidis, Frank Elegar, Dimitris Charitopoulos, Serafinos Mantalvanos, Feliks Kojadinović, Andreas Kanonidis, George Theodosiou, Stefanos Fazianos, Giannis Yiannis, Dimitrios Kalogeropoulous, Savo Đikanović, Adam McCoy

== Notable players ==
Note: Flags indicate national team eligibility at FIBA-sanctioned events. Players may hold other non-FIBA nationalities not displayed.

Criteria

To appear in this section a player must have either:

- Set a club record or won an individual award while at the club
- Played at least one official international match for their national team at any time
- Played at least one official NBA match at any time.

Greece:

- (Greece) Vassilis Spanoulis
- (Greece) Georgios Bartzokas
- (Greece) Marios Batis
- (Greece) Nikos Boudouris
- (Greece) (United States) Pat Calathes
- (Greece) Kostas Charalampidis
- (Greece) Georgios Diamantopoulos
- (Greece) Alexis Falekas
- (Greece) Dimitris Fosses
- (Greece) Andreas Glyniadakis
- (Greece) Kostas Kaimakoglou
- (Greece) Georgios Karagkoutis
- (Greece) (United States) John Korfas
- (Greece) Angelos Koronios
- (Greece) Fanis Koumpouras
- (Greece) Alexis Kyritsis
- (Greece) Nikos Liakopoulos
- (Greece) Lefteris Mantzoukas
- (Greece) Dimitris Marmarinos
- (Greece) Dimitris Mavroeidis
- (Greece) Loukas Mavrokefalidis
- (Greece) Makis Nikolaidis
- (Greece) (United States) Pete Papachronis
- (Greece) Spyros Panteliadis
- (Greece) Michalis Pelekanos
- (Greece) Grigoris Rallatos
- (Greece) Orfeas Stasinos
- (Greece) Tzanis Stavrakopoulos
- (Greece) Vangelis Vourtzoumis

Europe:

- Stephen Arigbabu
- Pat Burke
- Vasco Evtimov
- Elvar Már Friðriksson
- (Finland) Shawn Huff
- Michael Koch
- Branko Milisavljević
- (Greece) Igor Milošević
- Stevan Nađfeji
- Nikolay Padius
- Oliver Popović
- Miroslav Raduljica
- Renaldas Seibutis
- Blagota Sekulić
- Aleksandar Smiljanić
- (Greece) Anatoly Zourpenko

USA:

- (United States) Danya Abrams
- (United States) Lance Allred
- (United States) Ashraf Amaya
- (United States) Roderick Blakney
- (United States) Travon Bryant
- (United States) Junior Burrough
- (United States) Marty Conlon
- (United States) Jamon Gordon
- (United States) Jared Homan
- (United States) Andre Hutson
- (United States) Marcus Keene
- (United States) Billy Keys
- (United States) Erik Meek
- (United States) Jimmy Oliver
- (United States) Chris Owens
- (United States) Bill Phillips
- (United States) Craig Robinson
- (United States) Dickey Simpkins
- (United States) Larry Stewart
- (United States) Donell Taylor
- (United States) Chris Thomas
- (United States) Andy Toolson
- (United States) Henry Turner

Rest of Americas:

- Levon Kendall
- (United States) Cyril Langevine

Africa:

- Ismael Sanogo
- (United States) (Uganda) Nike Sibande

Oceania:

- Mark Dickel

== Maroussi players who played in the NBA ==
- (United States) Ashraf Amaya
- (United States) Lance Allred
- Pat Burke
- (United States) Junior Burrough
- (United States) Marty Conlon
- (Greece) Andreas Glyniadakis
- (United States) Jimmy Oliver
- (United States) Chris Owens
- (United States) Dickey Simpkins
- (Greece) Vassilis Spanoulis
- (United States) Larry Stewart
- (United States) Donell Taylor
- (United States) Andy Toolson
- (United States) Henry Turner
- (United States) Robert Woodard II

== Head coaches ==
- (Greece) Kostas Petropoulos
- (Greece) Vangelis Alexandris
- (Greece) Nikos Linardos
- (Greece) Panagiotis Giannakis
- Darko Russo
- (Greece) Soulis Markopoulos
- (Greece) Georgios Bartzokas
- (Greece) Kostas Keramidas

== Sponsorship names ==
- Telestet: (2001–03)
- TIM: (2003–04)
- Honda: (2004–07)
- Costa Coffee: (2007–09)
