= Christoforos Stefanidis =

Greek basketball player

Peristeri
- Position: Assistant coach
- League: Greek Basketball League

Personal information
- Born: July 28, 1980 (age 46) Athens, Greece
- Listed height: 6 ft 1.75 in (1.87 m)
- Listed weight: 185 lb (84 kg)

Career information
- Playing career: 1999–2021

Career history

Playing
- 1999–2004: Palaio Faliro
- 2004–2009: Maroussi
- 2009–2013: Kavala
- 2013–2015: Kolossos Rodou
- 2015–2016: Arkadikos
- 2016–2017: Lavrio
- 2017–2018: Rethymno
- 2018–2019: Apollon Patras
- 2019–2020: HANTH
- 2020–2021: Dafni Dafniou

Coaching
- 2025–present: Peristeri (assistant)

Christoforos Stefanidis (alternate spelling: Christophoros, Greek: Χριστόφορος Στεφανίδης; born July 28, 1980), is a Greek former professional basketball player and basketball coach.

== Professional career ==
Stefanidis played two seasons with Kolossos Rodou of the Greek Basket League, from 2013 until 2015. In the 2013–14 season, he averaged 8.5 points, 2 assists, and 1 rebound per game, in the Greek League. He moved to the Greek club Lavrio, in 2016.
