= List of basketball clubs in Greece by major honours won =

This is a list of the major honours won by basketball clubs in Greece. It lists every Greek professional basketball club to have won one of the two major Greek national domestic trophies, the Greek League championship and the Greek Cup title, as well as any of the major official European continental-wide competitions.

== Honours table ==
| | Club | Greek League | Greek Cup | Greek Basketball Super Cup | EuroLeague (1st–tier) | FIBA Saporta Cup/EuroCup (2nd–tier) | FIBA Korać Cup/BCL (3rd–tier) | other European Cups (4th–tier) | FIBA Intercontinental Cup | Total |
|---|---|---|---|---|---|---|---|---|---|---|
| 1. | Panathinaikos | 40 | 22 | 1 | 7 | 0 | 0 | 0 | 1 | 71 |
| 2. | Olympiacos | 16 | 12 | 5 | 4 | 0 | 0 | 0 | 1 | 38 |
| 3. | Aris | 10 | 8 | 1 | 0 | 1 | 1 | 1 | 0 | 22 |
| 4. | AEK | 8 | 5 | 0 | 0 | 2 | 1 | 0 | 1 | 17 |
| 5. | PAOK | 2 | 3 | 0 | 0 | 1 | 1 | 0 | 0 | 7 |
| 6. | Panellinios | 6 | 0 | 0 | 0 | 0 | 0 | 0 | 0 | 6 |
| 7. | Iraklis | 2 | 0 | 0 | 0 | 0 | 0 | 0 | 0 | 2 |
| 8. | Promitheas | 0 | 0 | 1 | 0 | 0 | 0 | 0 | 0 | 1 |
| 9. | Maroussi | 0 | 0 | 0 | 0 | 1 | 0 | 0 | 0 | 1 |
| 10. | Panionios | 0 | 1 | 0 | 0 | 0 | 0 | 0 | 0 | 1 |
| 11. | Athens University | 1 | 0 | 0 | 0 | 0 | 0 | 0 | 0 | 1 |
| 12. | Near East | 1 | 0 | 0 | 0 | 0 | 0 | 0 | 0 | 1 |
