= Petros Noeas =

Greek basketball player

Petros Noeas Πέτρος Νοέας
No. 5 – Koroivos
- Position: Power forward
- League: Greek A2 Basket League

Personal information
- Born: 20 June 1987 (age 39) Kalamata, Greece
- Listed height: 6 ft 9 in (2.06 m)
- Listed weight: 227 lb (103 kg)

Career information
- Playing career: 2004–present

Career history
- 2004–2009: Maroussi
- 2009–2010: Trikala 2000
- 2010–2011: Maroussi
- 2011–2012: AEK Athens
- 2012–2014: Koroivos
- 2014–2015: Arkadikos
- 2015–2016: Promitheas Patras
- 2016–2017: Panionios
- 2017–2018: Psychiko
- 2018–2019: Diagoras Dryopideon
- 2019–2020: Olympiacos B
- 2020–2023: Skifa
- 2023–present: Koroivos B.C.

Career highlights
- Greek 2nd Division champion (2017); Greek 2nd Division Top Rebounder (2014)
Medals
Men's basketball
Representing Greece
Mediterranean Games
Silver medal – second place	2009 Pescara	Under-26

Petros Noeas (Greek: Πέτρος Νοέας; born 1987) is a Greek professional basketball player for Koroivos B.C. of the Greek A2 Basket League. At a height of 2.06 m (6 ft 9 in) in height, he plays at the power forward position.

== Professional career ==
Noeas started his career with the Greek Basket League club Maroussi, where he played from 2004 to 2009. He then moved to the Greek club Trikala 2000 (2009–10), and then back to Maroussi (2010–11). He joined the Greek club AEK Athens for the 2011–12 season, and then moved to the Greek club Koroivos. He moved to the Greek club Arkadikos, in 2014.

On 12 August 2016, Noeas joined Panionios, of the Greek 2nd Division. On 12 July 2017, Noeas joined Doukas, of the Greek 2nd Division, but his contract was later cancelled. He joined Olympiacos' new reserve team of the Greek 2nd Division, Olympiacos B, for the 2019–20 season.

== National team career ==
Noeas was a member of the junior national teams of Greece. With Greece's junior national teams, he played at the following tournaments: the 2003 FIBA Europe Under-16 Championship, the 2004 FIBA Europe Under-18 Championship, the 2005 FIBA Europe Under-18 Championship, the 2006 FIBA Europe Under-20 Championship, and the 2007 FIBA Europe Under-20 Championship. He also won the silver medal at the 2009 Mediterranean Games, with the Greek under-26 national team.
