= Spyros Panteliadis =

Greek basketball player (born 1977)

Personal information
- Born: January 30, 1977 (age 49) Athens, Greece
- Listed height: 6 ft 3 in (1.91 m)

Career information
- Playing career: 1997–present
- Position: Point guard

Career history
- 1997–2000: Maroussi
- 2000–2002: AEK Athens
- 2002: Ionikos Nea Philadelphia
- 2003: Ciudad de Huelva
- 2003–2004: PAOK Thessalaoniki
- 2004–2005: Skyliners Frankfurt
- 2005–2006: AEK Athens
- 2006–2008: Aris Thessalaoniki
- 2008–2011: Kolossos Rodou
- 2011–2013: Polis Kallitheas
- 2013–2014: Kouros Anavissou
- 2015–present: Kronos Geraka

Spyridon "Spyros" Panteliadis (alternate spellings: Spiridon, Spyros) (Greek: Σπυρίδων "Σπύρος" Παντελιάδης; (born January 30, 1977, in Athens, Greece) is a Greek professional basketball player. At 1.91 m (6 ft. 3 in.) tall, he played at the point guard position.

== Professional career ==
Panteliadis started playing basketball with Panionios and he played with them in the Korać Cup in the 1993–94 season. He also loaned to Esperos Kallitheas B.C., during 1996–97 season. His first pro contract started with Maroussi. In the early years of his career, he won the Greek League championship and the Greek Cup with AEK Athens.

He then moved to Ionikos N.F., and then to Spain and Ciudad de Huelva, and then to PAOK. He then moved to the German League club Skyliners. He then played with Aris and Kolossos Rodou. He then played in the Greek minor league divisions with Polis Kallitheas, Kouros Anavissou, and Kronos Geraka.

== National team career ==
Panteliadis was a member of the junior national teams of Greece. With Greece's junior national team, he played at the 1994 FIBA Europe Under-18 Championship.

== Awards and accomplishments ==
- Greek Cup winner: (2001)
- Greek League champion: (2002)
