= Alexis Falekas =

Greek basketball player and coach

Alexis Falekas Αλέξης Φαλέκας
Zhejiang Golden Bulls
- Title: Head coach
- League: Chinese Basketball Association

Personal information
- Born: August 1, 1976 (age 50) Athens, Greece
- Listed height: 6 ft 2.75 in (1.90 m)
- Listed weight: 205 lb (93 kg)

Career information
- Playing career: 1997–2014
- Position: Point guard
- Coaching career: 2014–present

Career history

Playing
- 1997–2002: Maroussi
- 2002–2005: Panionios
- 2005–2006: Kolossos Rodou
- 2006–2007: AGE Chalkida
- 2007–2008: Panorama
- 2008–2011: Ikaros Kallitheas
- 2011–2014: AEK Athens
- 2014: Ikaros Kallitheas

Coaching
- 2014–2019: AEK Athens (assistant, Cadets, Juniors)
- 2019–2022: Zhejiang Lions (assistant)
- 2022–2024: Zhejiang Lions
- 2024–2025: Peristeri (assistant)
- 2025: Zhejiang Golden Bulls (assistant)
- 2025–present: Zhejiang Golden Bulls

Career highlights
- As player: FIBA Saporta Cup champion (2001); 2× Greek 2nd Division champion (2010, 2014); As assistant coach: FIBA Champions League champion (2018)
Medals
Men's basketball
Representing Greece
Mediterranean Games
Silver medal – second place	2001 Tunis	Under-26

Alexandros "Alexis" Falekas (Greek: Αλέξανδρος "Αλέξης" Φαλέκας; born August 1, 1976) is a Greek former professional basketball player and current basketball coach for the Zhejiang Golden Bulls of the Chinese Basketball Association (CBA). At 1.90m (6'3") in height, he played at the point guard position.

== Professional career ==
Falekas started his pro career with Maroussi (1997–02), winning the FIBA Saporta Cup with them in 2001. He then moved to Panionios (2002–05), and then Kolossos (2005–06), and then AGE Chalkida (2006–07), Panorama (2007–08), and then to Ikaros Kallitheas (2008–11). He then played at AEK Athens from 2011 to 2014.

== National team career ==
Falekas won a silver medal with Greece's under-26 national team selection at the 2001 Mediterranean Games.

== Coaching career ==
Falekas began his coaching career in 2014, when he became an assistant coach with AEK Athens during the time that Vangelis Ziagkos was the head coach of the team. Later that season, he became the head coach of the cadets and juniors of the club.
