= Dimitris Bogdanos =

Greek basketball player

No. 9 – Anorthosis Volos
- Position: Small forward / power forward

Personal information
- Born: October 26, 1975 (age 51) Athens, Greece
- Listed height: 6 ft 7.5 in (2.02 m)
- Listed weight: 240 lb (109 kg)

Career information
- Playing career: 2002–-

Career history
- 2002–2003: Ionikos NF
- 2005–2006: AEL Larissa
- 2007–2009: Trikala 2000
- 2009–2010: Olympia Larissa
- 2016-2017: Niki Volos
- 2017-2020: Olympiacos Volos
- 2020-: Anorthosis Volos BC

Dimitris Bogdanos (Greek: Δημήτρης Μπογδάνος; born October 26, 1975) is a Greek former professional basketball player. At a height of 2.02 m (6' 7 1/2") in height, he played at both the small forward and power forward positions.

== Professional career ==
During his professional club career, Bogdanos played with clubs such as: Ionikos NF, AEL Larissa, Panorama, Trikala 2000, and Gymnastikos S. Larissas.
