= 2006–07 Greek Basket League =

2006–07 Greek Basket League season
- League: Greek Basket League
- Sport: Basketball
- Teams: 14
- TV partner(s): SKAI TV, ERT, Nova Sports

Regular Season
- Season champions: Panathinaikos
- Season MVP: (Greece) Dimitris Diamantidis
- Top scorer: (United States) Keydren Clark 490 Points (18.8 PPG)

Playoffs

Finals
- Champions: Panathinaikos
- Runners-up: Olympiacos
- Finals MVP: (Greece) Dimitris Diamantidis

Greek Basket League seasons
- ← 2005–06 2007–08 →

The 2006–07 Greek Basket League season was the 67th season of the Greek Basket League, the highest tier professional basketball league in Greece. Panathinaikos finished in first place in the regular season, and won the championship, via the playoffs.

== Teams ==
Location of teams in Greek Basket League 2006–07

Club	Home city
AEK Athens	Athens
AEL 1964	Larissa
Aigaleo	Aigaleo, Athens
Apollon Patras	Patras
Aris	Thessaloniki
Makedonikos	Kozani (temporarily)
Maroussi	Maroussi, Athens
Olympia Larissa	Larissa
Olympiacos	Piraeus
Olympias Patras	Patras
Panathinaikos	Athens
Panellinios	Athens
Panionios	Nea Smyrni, Athens
PAOK	Thessaloniki

== Regular season ==
=== Standings ===
Pos	Team	Total							Home				Away			
		Pts	Pld	W	L	F	A	GD	W	L	F	A	W	L	F	A
1.	Panathinaikos	50	26	24	2	2246	1700	546	12	1	1140	873	12	1	1106	827
2.	Aris	47	26	21	5	1961	1812	149	11	2	937	882	10	3	1024	930
3.	Olympiacos	47	26	21	5	2150	1844	306	10	3	1063	899	11	2	1087	945
4.	Panionios	42	26	16	10	1976	1842	134	10	3	1056	929	6	7	920	913
5.	Panellinios	41	26	15	11	1968	1994	-26	9	4	954	941	6	7	1014	1053
6.	PAOK	41	26	15	11	1989	1987	2	10	3	994	948	5	8	995	1039
7.	Olympia Larissa	39	26	13	13	1926	1982	-56	7	6	1012	986	6	7	914	996
8.	Maroussi	37	26	11	15	1943	1902	41	9	4	1014	919	2	11	929	983
9.	AEK Athens	36	26	10	16	2014	2103	-89	7	6	1032	1046	3	10	982	1057
10.	Olympias Patras	36	26	10	16	1810	1877	-67	7	6	944	904	3	10	866	973
11.	AEL 1964	34	26	8	18	1981	2135	-154	4	9	1005	1051	4	9	976	1084
12.	Aigaleo	34	26	8	18	1893	2086	-193	6	7	1011	1033	2	11	882	1053
13.	Apollon Patras	32	26	6	20	1901	2124	-223	5	8	942	1028	1	12	959	1096
14.	Makedonikos	30	26	4	22	1728	2098	-370	4	9	917	1026	0	13	811	1072

Pts=Points, P=Matches played, W=Matches won, L=Matches lost, F=Points for, A=Points against, D=Points difference

Playoff
Relegation to HEBA A2

=== Results ===
	AEK	AEL	AIG	APO	ARI	MAK	MAR	OLL	OLP	OLY	PAO	PGS	PAN	PAOK
AEK Athens		79-73	69-72	90-97	64-89	87-66	82-79	89-74	75-53	80-97	52-82	85-92	83-80	97-92
AEL 1964	81-87		97-71	90-88	81-86	67-62	82-88	78-90	71-73	83-94	65-82	65-85	64-66	81-79
Aigaleo	87-83	82-63		101-92	76-82	84-63	91-88	85-76	60-80	69-84	62-90	83-85	66-76	65-71
Apollon Patras	86-79	78-79	87-79		67-86	88-69	58-55	59-61	79-69	70-85	62-104	75-91	59-88	74-83
Aris	73-68	78-69	66-62	73-67		65-53	68-67	64-54	82-65	70-59	60-96	79-64	80-70	79-88
Makedonikos	80-76	79-81	79-42	72-68	50-73		91-103	72-75	73-86	60-88	44-106	86-87	54-68	77-73
Maroussi	86-69	89-71	63-62	93-81	62-69	90-69		80-82	83-64	71-91	60-66	88-70	66-62	83-63
Olympia Larissa	72-80	91-92	75-83	81-64	75-67	73-57	80-74		72-65	76-84	62-78	89-81	71-63	95-98
Olympias Patras	89-81	69-73	85-77	90-63	71-82	69-60	72-44	72-80		68-75	68-67	73-67	55-67	63-68
Olympiacos	74-70	91-60	82-77	95-71	70-76	102-59	71-53	74-60	81-68		73-74	84-71	79-81	87-79
Panathinaikos	96-80	92-81	101-56	81-61	82-69	101-65	79-73	87-58	75-49	84-89		107-77	87-57	68-58
Panellinios	61-66	77-67	84-59	83-72	66-77	68-62	79-78	77-71	78-69	70-94	57-83		74-72	80-71
Panionios	93-71	96-93	84-67	69-63	65-69	89-59	69-67	94-67	77-70	84-76	86-89	60-66		90-72
PAOK	79-72	83-74	81-75	78-72	101-99	89-67	61-60	65-66	67-55	60-71	76-89	79-78	75-70	

== Playoffs ==
=== Bracket ===
Quarterfinals
1	Panathinaikos	2
8	Maroussi	0
4	Panionios	2
5	Panellinios	0
2	Aris	2
7	Olympia Larissa	0
3	Olympiacos	2
6	PAOK	1

Semifinals
1	Panathinaikos	3
4	Panionios	0
2	Aris	2
3	Olympiacos	3

Finals
1	Panathinaikos	3
3	Olympiacos	2

=== Quarterfinals ===
==== (1) Panathinaikos vs. (8) Maroussi ====
Panathinaikos win the series 2-0

	Home team	Score	Away team	Venue	Date
Game 1	Panathinaikos	66 – 58	Maroussi	Olympic Sports Hall, Athens	May 13, 2007
Game 2	Maroussi	70 – 73	Panathinaikos	Maroussi Indoor Hall, Athens	May 15, 2007

==== (2) Aris vs. (7) Olympia Larissa ====
Aris win the series 2-0

	Home team	Score	Away team	Venue	Date
Game 1	Aris	82 – 68	Olympia Larissa	Alexandreio Melathron, Thessaloniki	May 9, 2007
Game 2	Olympia Larissa	72 – 82	Aris	Larissa Neapolis Arena, Larissa	May 12, 2007

==== (3) Olympiacos vs. (6) PAOK ====
Olympiacos win the series 2-1

	Home team	Score	Away team	Venue	Date
Game 1	Olympiacos	85 – 76	PAOK	Peace and Friendship Stadium, Athens	May 12, 2007
Game 2	PAOK	84 – 80	Olympiacos	PAOK Sports Arena, Thessaloniki	May 15, 2007
Game 3	Olympiacos	77 – 73	PAOK	Peace and Friendship Stadium, Athens	May 17, 2007

==== (4) Panionios vs. (5) Panellinios ====
Panionios win the series 2-0

	Home team	Score	Away team	Venue	Date
Game 1	Panionios	78 – 72	Panellinios	Helliniko Olympic Arena, Athens	May 9, 2007
Game 2	Panellinios	54 – 67	Panionios	Panellinios Indoor Hall, Athens	May 12, 2007

=== Semifinals ===
==== (1) Panathinaikos vs. (4) Panionios ====
Panathinaikos win the series 3-0

	Home team	Score	Away team	Venue	Date
Game 1	Panathinaikos	85 – 77	Panionios	Olympic Sports Hall, Athens	May 20, 2007
Game 2	Panionios	65 – 69	Panathinaikos	Helliniko Olympic Arena, Athens	May 24, 2007
Game 3	Panathinaikos	85 – 67	Panionios	Olympic Sports Hall, Athens	May 27, 2007

==== (2) Aris vs. (3) Olympiacos ====
Olympiacos win the series 3-2

	Home team	Score	Away team	Venue	Date
Game 1	Aris	78 – 76	Olympiacos	Alexandreio Melathron, Thessaloniki	May 20, 2007
Game 2	Olympiacos	82 – 68	Aris	Peace and Friendship Stadium, Athens	May 24, 2007
Game 3	Aris	81 – 71	Olympiacos	Alexandreio Melathron, Thessaloniki	May 27, 2007
Game 4	Olympiacos	92 – 68	Aris	Peace and Friendship Stadium, Athens	May 30, 2007
Game 5	Aris	75 – 83	Olympiacos	Alexandreio Melathron, Thessaloniki	June 2, 2007

=== 3rd place ===
==== (2) Aris vs. (4) Panionios ====
Aris win the series 3-2

	Home team	Score	Away team	Venue	Date
Game 1	Aris	84 – 82	Panionios	Alexandreio Melathron, Thessaloniki	June 5, 2007
Game 2	Panionios	74 – 62	Aris	Helliniko Olympic Arena, Athens	June 9, 2007
Game 3	Aris	65 – 57	Panionios	Alexandreio Melathron, Thessaloniki	June 12, 2007
Game 4	Panionios	92 – 88	Aris	Helliniko Olympic Arena, Athens	June 16, 2007
Game 5	Aris	73 – 60	Panionios	Alexandreio Melathron, Thessaloniki	June 19, 2007

=== Finals ===
==== (1) Panathinaikos vs. (3) Olympiacos ====
Panathinaikos win the series 3-2

Game 1

6 June 2007

(Report)

Panathinaikos	79–72	Olympiacos
Scoring by quarter: 18-18, 26-16, 18-12, 17-26

Olympic Indoor Hall, Athens
Attendance: 12,000

Game 2

10 June 2007

(Report)

Olympiacos	76–72	Panathinaikos
Scoring by quarter: 20-20, 17-22, 18-17, 21-13

Peace and Friendship Stadium, Athens
Attendance: 12,000

Game 3

13 June 2007

(Report)

Panathinaikos	86–85 (OT)	Olympiacos
Scoring by quarter: 28-20, 12-22, 20-21, 18-15, Overtime: 8-7

Olympic Indoor Hall, Athens
Attendance: 17,000

Game 4

17 June 2007

(Report)

Olympiacos	78–68	Panathinaikos
Scoring by quarter: 19-20, 22-24, 19-8, 18-16

Peace and Friendship Stadium, Athens
Attendance: 13,000

Game 5

20 June 2007

(Report)

Panathinaikos	89–76	Olympiacos
Scoring by quarter: 18-16, 27-30, 23-11, 21-19

Olympic Indoor Hall, Athens
Attendance: 9,500

== Final league table ==
Pos	Team
1.	Panathinaikos
2.	Olympiacos
3.	Aris
4.	Panionios
5.	Panellinios
6.	PAOK
7.	Olympia Larissa
8.	Maroussi
9.	AEK Athens
10.	Olympias Patras
11.	AEL 1964
12.	Aigaleo
13.	Apollon Patras
14.	Makedonikos

2007–08 Euroleague Regular Season
2007–08 ULEB Cup Regular Season
Relegation to HEBA A2 2007–08

Greek Basket League 2006–07
Champions
Panathinaikos
28th Title

== Awards ==
=== Greek League MVP ===
- (Greece) Dimitris Diamantidis– Panathinaikos

=== Greek League Finals MVP ===
- (Greece) Dimitris Diamantidis– Panathinaikos

=== All-Greek League Team ===
- (Greece) Dimitris Diamantidis – Panathinaikos
- (Lithuania) Ramūnas Šiškauskas – Panathinaikos
- (Greece) Stratos Perperoglou – Panionios
- (Greece) Panagiotis Vasilopoulos – Olympiacos
- (United States) Mike Batiste – Panathinaikos

=== Best Coach ===
- (Serbia) Željko Obradović – Panathinaikos

=== Best Young Player ===
- (Greece) Giorgos Printezis – Olympia Larissa

== Statistical leaders ==
Greek Basket League stats leaders are counted by totals, rather than averages, and include both regular season.

Points

Pos.	Player	Club	Total points
1.	(United States) Keydren Clark	Aigaleo	490
2.	(United States) Arthur Lee	AEL 1964	448
3.	(Croatia) Ivo Josipović	Apollon	391
4.	(United States) Kennedy Winston	Panionios	385
5.	(Montenegro) Vlado Šćepanović	PAOK	235

Rebounds

Pos.	Player	Club	Total Rebounds
1.	(United States) Andre Hutson	Panionios	212
2.	(United States) Jeremiah Massey	Aris	190
3.	(United States) Brent Scott	AEK Athens	173
4.	(Greece) Yiannis Bourousis	Olympiacos	173
5.	(Montenegro) Savo Djikanovic	Olympia Larissa	168

Assists

Pos.	Player	Club	Total Assists
1.	(Greece) Dimitris Diamantidis	Panathinaikos	128
2.	(United States) Scoonie Penn	Olympiacos	84
3.	(Croatia) Vladimir Krstić	Olympia Larissa	80
4.	(United States) Keydren Clark	Aigaleo	79
5.	(Greece) Giannis Gagaloudis	AEK	78

Steals

Pos.	Player	Club	Total Steals
1.	(Greece) Dimitris Diamantidis	Panathinaikos	50
2.	(Greece) Michalis Pelekanos	Panellinios	47
3.	(United States) Scoonie Penn	Olympiacos	43
4.	(United States) Corey Belser	Olympia Larissa	38
5.	(United States) Mike Wilkinson	Aris	36

Blocks

Pos.	Player	Club	Total Blocks
1.	(Greece) Kostas Charissis	Olympias Patras	40
2.	(Greece) Yiannis Bourousis	Olympiacos	26
3.	(United States) Jeremiah Massey	Aris	25
4.	(Lithuania) Robertas Javtokas	Panathinaikos	21
5.	(Venezuela) Héctor Romero	AEL 1964	20

Source: Galanis Sports Data

== Clubs in international competitions ==
Team	Competition	Result
Panathinaikos	EuroLeague	Final-4, 1st place
Olympiacos	EuroLeague	Playoffs, Quarterfinals
Aris	EuroLeague	Top 16, 4th place
PAOK	ULEB Cup	Top 16, Home and away format
AEK	ULEB Cup	Regular season, 6th place
Panionios	FIBA EuroCup	Playoffs, Quarterfinals
Maroussi	FIBA EuroCup	Round II, 4th place
Olympias Patras	FIBA EuroCup Challenge	Regular season, 3rd place
