= Christos Iordanou (basketball) =

Greek basketball player

No. 23 – Maroussi
- Position: Small forward / shooting guard
- League: Greek Basketball League

Personal information
- Born: November 23, 1998 (age 27) Athens, Greece
- Listed height: 6 ft 5 in (1.96 m)
- Listed weight: 190 lb (86 kg)

Career information
- Playing career: 2016–present

Career history
- 2016–2022: Psychiko
- 2022–2023: Kolossos Rodou
- 2023–present: Maroussi

Christos Iordanou (Greek: Χρήστος Ιορδάνου; born November 11, 1998) is a Greek professional basketball player for Maroussi of the Greek Basketball League. He is a 1.96 m (6 ft 5 in) tall swingman.

== Professional career ==
After playing at the academies Pnathinaikos, Iordanou began his pro career in 2016, during the 2016–17 season, with the Greek 2nd Division club Psychiko. During his tenure with the club, Iordanou tore his ACL three times, but managed to come back and make an impact for the team, where he stayed until 2022.

After six years with Psychiko, he joined Kolossos Rodou of the Greek Basket League.

On September 14, 2023, Iordanou signed with the newly promoted to the Greek Basket League club Maroussi. On Jyly 5, 2025, Iordanou extended his contract with the club until 2028.
