= Pannaxiakos A.O. (sports club) =

Greek sports club

- Full name: Pannaxiakos Athlitikos Omilos
- Nicknames: Pannaxa
- Founded: 1960
- Colours: Blue, White
- Anthem: Imnos Pannaxiakou (Vaggelis Konitopoulos)

Pannaxiakos Athlitikos Omilos (Greek: Πανναξιακός Αθλητικός Όμιλος, Pannaxian Athletic Union), commonly referred to as Pannaxiakos, is a Greek sports club based in Naxos.

== History ==
The club was founded in 1960 in Naxos.

== Crest and Colours ==
Since the club's foundation, the colors are blue and white referring to the sea. The emblem of the Association is the "trademark" of the town of Naxos, the gate of the ancient temple of Apollo on the northwestern edge of the harbor, the famous "Portara".

== Departments ==
The club fields teams in many sports, including athletics and association football.

=== Titles ===
==== Pannaxiakos F.C. ====
  - Cyclades FCA Champions: 8
    - 1982–83, 1992–93, 1998–99, 2002–03, 2010–11, 2014–15, 2019–20, 2025–26
  - Cyclades FCA Cup Winners: 7
    - 1986–87, 2003–04, 2006–07, 2011–12, 2012–13, 2014–15, 2025–26

== Former departments ==
In the past, the club had departments in basketball and volleyball, when merged in 2006 with A.O. Naxos 2004 and make the club Pannaxiakos A.O.N.

=== Titles ===
==== Pannaxiakos V.C. ====
- A2 (1) :

2013

- Greek Women's Volleyball Cup Finalist (1) :

2014
