= Aigaleo B.C. =

A.O. Aigaleo A.O. Αιγάλεω
- Nickname: The City
- Founded: 1956
- History: 1956 – Present
- Arena: Aigaleo Stavros Venetis Indoor Hall
- Capacity: 2,000
- Location: Aigaleo, Athens, Greece
- Team colors: Blue and White
- Championships: Greek 3rd Division: (1); Greek 4th Division: (3)
- Website: aoaigaleo.gr
Home	Away

Aigaleo B.C. (alternate spelling: Egaleo) (Greek: Αιγάλεω) is a Greek professional basketball team that is located in Aigaleo, Greece, which is a suburb of Athens. The club's full name is Aigaleo A.O. B.C. (Greek: Αιγάλεω A.O.). Aigaleo currently plays in the third-tier level of Greek basketball, the Greek B Basket League.

== History ==
The team's parent athletic club was founded in 1931, as Ierapolis Athletic Union (Greek: Αθλητική Ένωσις Ιεράπολι), and the basketball division of the athletic organization was founded in 1956, by Alexandros Stavropoulos. Although the basketball department was founded in 1956, it took the club exactly fifty years to participate in the Greek First Division, which is the highest professional basketball league in Greece, in the 2006–07 season. During the 1950s and 1960s, the team remained in the lowest local (third) division, until 1971, when it qualified for the higher league, because of a new categorical system.

In 1973 and 1974, Aigaleo B.C. won two league promotions, and finally took part in the 3rd-tier level Greek B Basket League (1974–75, 1975–76 seasons). For the next 12 years, the team participated in the first local league (A E.S.K.A.), except in the 1981–82 season, when it was in the B E.S.K.A., after 1981's relegation. During the late 1980s and early 1990s, Aigaleo B.C. participated in the 4th-tier level Greek C Basket League, where it played six seasons in total, but was it relegated again to the local league in 1994.

In 1997, Aigaleo won the A E.S.K.A. championship, and after two years, in 1999, Aigaleo B.C. returned to the Greek B League, where it played for six seasons in total. In 2004, Aigaleo B.C. won the Greek B League championship, and after having a short presence in the 2nd-tier level Greek A2 Basket League, it was promoted to the top-tier level Greek Basket League, in 2006. From 1999 to 2006, the team was coached by Dimitrios Karvelas, and after him, Thanasis Skourtopoulos took that position.

== Arena ==
Aigaleo plays its home games at the 2,000 seat Aigaleo Stavros Venetis Indoor Hall.

== Titles and honors ==
=== Domestic competitions ===
- Greek 3rd Division

Champions (1): (2003–04)

- Greek 4th Division

Champions (3): (1998–99, 2000–01, 2018–19)

== League pyramid history ==
Seasons	Greek League	Greek A2 League	Greek B League	Greek C League	A E.S.K.A.	B E.S.K.A.	C E.S.K.A.
3	2007, 2008, 2009	—	—	—	—	—	—
3	—	2005, 2006, 2010	—	—	—	—	—
9	—	—	1975, 1976, 2000, 2002, 2003, 2004, 2011, 2012, 2013, 2014, 2020, 2021, 2022	—	—	—	—
8	—	—	—	1989, 1993, 1994, 1998, 1999, 2001, 2015, 2019	—	—	—
21	—	—	—	—	1974, 1977–81, 1983–88, 1990–92, 1995–97, 2016, 2017, 2018	—	—
3	—	—	—	—	—	1972, 1973, 1982	—
15	—	—	—	—	—	—	1957–71

== Notable players ==
Note: Flags indicate national team eligibility at FIBA-sanctioned events. Players may hold other non-FIBA nationalities not displayed.

Criteria

To appear in this section a player must have either:

- Set a club record or won an individual award while at the club
- Played at least one official international match for their national team at any time
- Played at least one official NBA match at any time.

Greece

- (Greece) Stelios Amerikanos
- (Greece) Nikos Angelopoulos
- (Greece) Nikos Charalampopoulos
- (Greece) Vassilis Charalampopoulos
- (Greece) Athanasios Diamantopoulos
- (Greece) Ioannis Dimakos
- (Greece) Andronikos Gizogiannis
- (Greece) Ioannis Golfinopoulos
- (Greece) Akis Kallinikidis
- (Greece) Vangelis Karampoulas
- (Greece) Giorgos Kassanos
- (Greece) Ioannis Kolios
- (Greece) Giorgos Kosmopoulos
- (Greece) Ioannis Kyriakopoulos
- (Greece) Giannoulis Larentzakis
- (Greece) Kostas Leventakos
- (Greece) Dimitrios Lolas
- (Greece) Kostas Magkounis
- (Greece) Spyros Magkounis
- (Greece) Nikos Michalos
- (Greece) Iakovos Milentigievits
- (Greece) Makis Nikolaidis
- (Greece) Kostas Papageorgiou
- (Greece) Christos Petrodimopoulos
- (Greece) Nikos Pettas
- (Greece) Michalis Polytarchou
- (Greece) Vangelis Sakellariou
- (Greece) Dimitrios Sakellariou
- (Greece) Miloš Šakota
- (Greece) Vassilis Soulis
- (Greece) Giorgos Thomopoulos
- (Greece) Stamatis Villiotis

Europe

- (Republic of Ireland) Chris Bracey
- (Germany) Guido Grunheid
- (Slovenia) Dejan Hohler
- (Bosnia and Herzegovina) Abdurahman Kahrimanović
- (Croatia) Vladimir Krstić
- (Germany) Robert Maras
- (Serbia) Ninoslav Marjanovic
- (Republic of Ireland) Donnie McGrath
- (Czech Republic) Robert Šarović

USA

- (United States) Rashad Anderson
- (United States) Keydren Clark
- (United States) Anthony Goldwire
- (United States) Leemire Goldwire
- (United States) DeVon Hardin
- (United States) Ibby Jaaber
- (United States) Andrae Patterson
- (United States) Donell Taylor

== Head coaches ==
- (Greece) Nikolaos Terkesidis
- (Greece) Alexandros Kontovounisios
- (Greece) Georgios Amerikanos
- (Greece) Georgios Trontzos
- (Greece) Pavlos Diakoulas
- (Greece) Loukas Kontos
- (Greece) Serafeim Potosoglou
- (Greece) Giorgos Nikitopoulos
- (Greece) Aris Raftopoulos
- (Greece) Pavlos Stamelos
- (Greece) Argiris Kambouris
- (Greece) Steve Giatzoglou
- (Greece) Giorgos Zevgolis
- (Greece) Takis Panoulias
- (Greece) Kostas Keramidas
- (Greece) Thanasis Skourtopoulos

== Sources ==
- "Απ' τις αλάνες της Ε.Σ.Κ.Α. στα παρκέ της A1-The History of Egaleo Men Basketball Team 1956–2008", Nikos D. Nikolaidis, "Emvryo" Publications, 2008, ISBN 9789608002456.
