= Trikala 2000 B.C. =

Greek professional basketball club

Trikala 2000
- Founded: 1999
- Folded: 2010
- History: Trikala 2000 (2000–2010)
- Arena: Trikala Municipal Sports Hall
- Capacity: 2,500
- Location: Trikala, Greece
- Team colors: White and Blue
- President: George Giannoulas
- Head coach: Vangelis Angelou
- Championships: Greek 2nd Division: (1) (2008)
- Website: Eurobasket.com/ASTrikalla2000
Home	Away

A.S. Trikala 2000 B.C. was a Greek professional basketball club located in Trikala, Greece. The club was commonly known as either shortly Trikala or Trikala 2000. Trikala previously competed in the Greek League, the top tier of Greek basketball.

== History ==
The Athletic Association of Trikala 2000 was founded on September 13, 1999, following the merger of local Trikala teams Danaos and Sporting. The club had a rapid rise up the Greek basketball leagues. In 2002, just three years after they were founded, Trikala won promotion to the 3rd-tier level Greek B Basket League. In 2006, they again won promotion, that time to the 2nd-tier level Greek A2 Basket League. Just two years later, they completed their journey, by gaining promotion to the top-tier level Greek Basket League, after winning the A2 League, during the 2007–08 season.

The team's first season in the top league in Greece was a relatively successful and dramatic one, as they safeguarded their survival in the league, in the last game of the season, on April 22, 2009. In October 2010, the club went bankrupt.

== Honors and titles ==
- Greek 2nd Division:
  - 2008

== Notable players ==
Note: Flags indicate national team eligibility at FIBA-sanctioned events. Players may hold other non-FIBA nationalities not displayed.

Criteria

To appear in this section a player must have either:

- Set a club record or won an individual award while at the club
- Played at least one official international match for their national team at any time
- Played at least one official NBA match at any time.

Greece:

- Georgios Apostolidis
- Dimitris Bogdanos
- Dimitris Charitopoulos
- Nikos Kaklamanos
- Dimitris Marmarinos
- Makis Nikolaidis
- Petros Noeas
- Michalis Polytarchou
- Vassilis Symtsak
- Michalis Tsairelis

Europe:

- Bojan Bakić
- Giorgi Tsintsadze
- Miha Zupan

USA:

- A.J. Abrams
- William Avery
- - Jelani Gardner
- Kasib Powell
- David Young

Oceania:

- Mark Dickel

== Head coaches ==
- Vangelis Angelou
- Yannis Christopoulos
