= 2000–01 FIBA Saporta Cup =

- League: FIBA Saporta Cup
- Sport: Basketball

Final
- Champions: (Greece) Maroussi
- Runners-up: (France) Élan Chalon
- Finals MVP: (United States) Jimmy Oliver

FIBA Saporta Cup seasons
- ← 1999–00 2001–02 →

The 2000–01 FIBA Saporta Cup was the thirty-fifth edition of FIBA's 2nd-tier level European-wide professional club basketball competition. It occurred between October 17, 2000, and April 17, 2001. The final was held at Hala Torwar, Warsaw, Poland.

== Competition system ==
- 24 teams (national domestic cup champions, plus the best qualified teams in the most important European national domestic leagues), entered a preliminary group stage, divided into four groups of six teams each, playing a round-robin. The final standing were based on individual wins and defeats. In case of a tie between two or more teams, after the group stage, the following criteria were used to decide the final classification: 1) number of wins in one-to-one games between the teams; 2) basket average between the teams; 3) general basket average within the group.
- The top four teams from each group qualified for a 1/8 Final Playoff (X-pairings, home and away games), while the winners advanced further to 1/4 Finals and 1/2 Finals.
- The Final was played at a predetermined venue.

== Team allocation ==
The labels in the parentheses show how each team qualified for the place of its starting round:

- 1st, 2nd, 3rd, 4th, 5th, etc.: League position after eventual Playoffs
- CW: Cup winners

Regular season
(France) Paris Basket Racing (6th)	(Turkey) Pınar Karşıyaka (4th)	(Cyprus) Keravnos Keo (1st)	(Poland) Anwil Włocławek (2nd)
(France) Élan Chalon (8th)	(Turkey) Beşiktaş (5th)	(Finland) Namika Lahti (1st)	(Portugal) Porto (CW)
(Greece) Aris (8th)	(Austria) Arkadia Traiskirchen Lions (1st)	(Germany) Telekom Baskets Bonn (4th)	(Russia) UNICS (3rd)
(Greece) Maroussi (10th)	(Belgium) Telindus Racing Antwerpen (1st)	(Israel) Hapoel Galil Elyon (4th)	(Slovakia) Slovakofarma Pezinok (1st)
(Spain) Caja San Fernando (5th)	(Bosnia and Herzegovina) Borac Banja Luka (1st)	(Italy) Lineltex AC Imola (12th)*	(Slovenia) Pivovarna Laško (2nd)
(Spain) Pamesa Valencia (6th)	(Croatia) Zagreb (4th)	(Lithuania) Sakalai (4th)	(Federal Republic of Yugoslavia) Crvena zvezda (3rd)

*As a substitute for Olimpia Milano which team withdrew from competition

== Regular season ==
=== Group A ===
Pos	Team	Pld	W	L	PF	PA	PD	Pts	Qualification	VAL	MAR	CHA	HGE	KAR	LAŠ
1	(Spain) Pamesa Valencia	10	7	3	877	857	+20	17	Advanced to Top 16	—	95–81	77–79	90–86	95–93	89–87
2	(Greece) Maroussi	10	7	3	875	813	+62	17	Advanced to Top 16	82–75	—	70–62	98–82	101–92	112–71
3	(France) Élan Chalon	10	6	4	714	693	+21	16	Advanced to Top 16	67–77	75–56	—	72–67	73–57	82–88
4	(Israel) Hapoel Galil Elyon	10	4	6	860	837	+23	14	Advanced to Top 16	94–97	89–83	60–68	—	121–90	83–85
5	(Turkey) Pınar Karşıyaka	10	3	7	854	912	−58	13		105–91	95–99	66–78	87–90	—	89–88
6	(Slovenia) Pivovarna Laško	10	3	7	797	865	−68	13		83–91	77–93	75–58	67–88	76–80	—

Source: FIBA Europe

=== Group B ===
Pos	Team	Pld	W	L	PF	PA	PD	Pts	Qualification	UNI	POR	ARI	BEŞ	ARK	ZAG
1	(Russia) UNICS	10	8	2	709	509	+200	18	Advanced to Top 16	—	97–70	93–61	60–65	93–50	20–0
2	(Portugal) Porto	10	7	3	654	606	+48	17	Advanced to Top 16	62–75	—	74–73	72–82	88–81	20–0
3	(Greece) Aris	10	7	3	719	659	+60	17	Advanced to Top 16	75–73	66–81	—	101–98	112–96	20–0
4	(Turkey) Beşiktaş	10	5	5	688	691	−3	15	Advanced to Top 16	65–85	57–74	87–101	—	85–84	20–0
5	(Austria) Arkadia Traiskirchen Lions	10	3	7	658	763	−105	13		61–93	75–93	57–90	114–109	—	20–0
6	(Croatia) Zagreb	10	0	10	0	200	−200	10		0–20	0–20	0–20	0–20	0–20	—

Source: FIBA Europe

=== Group C ===
Pos	Team	Pld	W	L	PF	PA	PD	Pts	Qualification	BONN	KER	CZV	CSF	PAR	SAK
1	(Germany) Telekom Baskets Bonn	10	8	2	880	801	+79	18	Advanced to Top 16	—	84–52	83–75	97–82	87–83	88–76
2	(Cyprus) Keravnos Keo	10	5	5	814	838	−24	15	Advanced to Top 16	87–95	—	93–79	92–90	92–83	78–92
3	(Federal Republic of Yugoslavia) Crvena zvezda	10	5	5	784	790	−6	15	Advanced to Top 16	94–89	95–84	—	80–76	66–68	69–68
4	(Spain) Caja San Fernando	10	4	6	836	815	+21	14	Advanced to Top 16	76–83	70–78	79–81	—	96–84	102–63
5	(France) Paris Basket Racing	10	4	6	789	810	−21	14		87–72	69–82	65–61	78–85	—	79–67
6	(Lithuania) Sakalai	10	4	6	802	851	−49	14		89–102	81–76	85–84	79–80	102–93	—

Source: FIBA Europe

=== Group D ===
Pos	Team	Pld	W	L	PF	PA	PD	Pts	Qualification	ANW	ANT	BOR	PEZ	LAH	IMO
1	(Poland) Anwil Włocławek	10	9	1	814	754	+60	19	Advanced to Top 16	—	90–84	87–83	81–79	91–76	82–51
2	(Belgium) Telindus Racing Antwerpen	10	6	4	804	777	+27	16	Advanced to Top 16	67–75	—	102–84	90–73	77–58	79–71
3	(Bosnia and Herzegovina) Borac Banja Luka	10	5	5	855	802	+53	15	Advanced to Top 16	90–74	72–78	—	94–76	111–69	87–70
4	(Slovakia) Slovakofarma Pezinok	10	5	5	851	832	+19	15	Advanced to Top 16	73–76	79–82	81–68	—	99–86	86–80
5	(Finland) Namika Lahti	10	3	7	770	863	−93	13		59–60	89–66	85–83	76–102	—	93–69
6	(Italy) Lineltex AC Imola	10	2	8	803	869	−66	12		92–98	86–79	80–83	99–103	105–79	—

Source: FIBA Europe

== Top 16 ==
Team 1	Agg.	Team 2	1st leg	2nd leg
Beşiktaş (Turkey)	156–188	(Spain) Pamesa Valencia	66–81	90–107
Aris (Greece)	76–108	(Greece) Maroussi	76–88	0–20*
Élan Chalon (France)	141–120	(Portugal) Porto	80–64	61–56
Hapoel Galil Elyon (Israel)	153–166	(Russia) UNICS	83–88	70–78
Slovakofarma Pezinok (Slovakia)	179–207	(Germany) Telekom Baskets Bonn	93–110	86–97
Borac Banja Luka (Bosnia and Herzegovina)	162–165	(Cyprus) Keravnos Keo	89–74	73–91
Crvena zvezda (Federal Republic of Yugoslavia)	89–113	(Belgium) Telindus Racing Antwerpen	89–93	0–20**
Caja San Fernando (Spain)	134–137	(Poland) Anwil Włocławek	69–67	65–70

* Aris didn't play the second leg because its players were on strike for not getting their salaries and Maroussi received a forfeit (20–0) in this game.

** The original second leg was suspended after several players of Telindus Racing Antwerpen and Crvena zvezda were disqualified. Later, FIBA decided that his game should be replayed a week later behind closed doors to avoid further incidents, but the Yugoslavian team didn't show up for the match and Telindus received a forfeit (20–0).

== Quarterfinals ==
Team 1	Agg.	Team 2	1st leg	2nd leg
Keravnos Keo (Cyprus)	122–175	(Spain) Pamesa Valencia	69–74	53–101
Telindus Racing Antwerpen (Belgium)	125–148	(Russia) UNICS	62–61	63–87
Maroussi (Greece)	203–173	(Germany) Telekom Baskets Bonn	102–82	101–91
Élan Chalon (France)	128–126	(Poland) Anwil Włocławek	65–54	63–72

== Semifinals ==
Team 1	Agg.	Team 2	1st leg	2nd leg
Pamesa Valencia (Spain)	132–138	(France) Élan Chalon	69–72	63–66
UNICS (Russia)	176–180	(Greece) Maroussi	95–87	81–93

== Final ==
April 17, Hala Torwar, Warsaw

Team 1	Score	Team 2
Maroussi (Greece)	74–72	(France) Élan Chalon

2000–01 FIBA Saporta Cup Champions

Maroussi
1st title

== Awards ==
=== FIBA Saporta Cup Finals MVP ===
- (United States) Jimmy Oliver ( (Greece) Maroussi)

== See also ==
- 2000–01 Euroleague
- 2000–01 FIBA SuproLeague
- 2000–01 FIBA Korać Cup
