= 2022–23 Greek Basketball Cup =

2022–23 Greek Cup
- Season: 2022–23
- Duration: 21 September 2022 – 19 February 2023
- Teams: 96

Finals
- Champions: Olympiacos (11th title)
- Runners-up: Peristeri bwin
- Finals MVP: (Bulgaria) Sasha Vezenkov

Statistical leaders
Points	(Bulgaria) Sasha Vezenkov	19.0
Rebounds	(Bulgaria) Sasha Vezenkov	7.6
Assists	(France) Moustapha Fall	4.3

The 2022–23 Greek Basketball Cup was the 48th edition of Greek top-tier level professional domestic basketball cup competition. The previous winner of the cup was Olympiacos. The cup competition started on 21 September 2022 and ended on 19 February 2023. Olympiacos won the competition.

== Format ==
The top seven placed teams from the top-tier level Greek Basket League's 2021–22 season, gained an automatic bye to the 2022–23 Greek Cup Final 8. While the remaining teams from the 2021–22 Greek Basket League season were eliminated from the 2022–23 Greek Cup tournament.

The eighth and last 2022–23 Greek Cup team was Panionios, the winner of the Greek UNICEF Trophy, which was contested between the teams from the Greek 2nd Division Elite League, the Greek 3rd Division National League 1, and the Greek 4th Division National League 2.

== Qualification tournament ==
=== Phase 1 ===
==== Round 1 (National League 2 South) ====
AOK Halandri	58 – 92	Argonaftis Triglias Rafinas
Near East	75 – 70	Dafni
Ergotelis	20 – 0 (w/o)	Niki Amarousiou
Galini Achaias	77 – 79	Kronos Agiou Dimitriou
Poseidon Neou Psychikou	57 – 55	Glafkos Esperos
KAP Agia Paraskevi	78 – 59	GS Ilioupolis
Sfika Amaliadas	0 – 20 (w/o)	AO Ermionidas
GS Koropiou	95 – 73	AO Kalamata 1980
KAO Melission	42 – 60	Dion Kiparissias
Eleftheria Moschatou	74 – 70	Mandraikos

==== Round 1 (National League 2 North) ====
Digenis Lakkomatos	55 – 86	PAOK Mesopotamias Kastorias
Koupa Kilkis	93 – 80	KAO Dramas
GAS Vassilikon Thessalonikis	72 – 61	Kastoria
GS Almirou	81 – 71	SAAK Anatolia
GS Sofadon	96 – 59	Roupel Sidirokastrou
Titanes Palama	20 – 0 (w/o)	Elpis Ampelokipon
Ioannina BC	87 – 79	Olympos Eleftheriou
M.E.N.T.	61 – 99	AO Trikala
Ethnikos Kozanis	85 – 54	AS Nikaia 2012

==== Round 1 (National League 1 South) ====
Proteas Voulas	67 – 61	AO Mykonou
Dafni Dafniou	0 – 20 (w/o)	Ethnikos Piraeus
Panionios	106 – 62	OFI Crete
Ilysiakos	0 – 20 (w/o)	Milon
Doukas	0 – 20 (w/o)	AO Ahagia 82
APAS Ta Fanaria Naxou	20 – 0 (w/o)	AO Enosi Iliou
Panelefsiniakos	94 – 79	Palaio Faliro
AO Pefkis	71 – 83	Pagrati
EFAO Zografou	57 – 83	Esperos Kallitheas

==== Round 1 (National League 1 North) ====
PS Efkarpias	20 – 0 (w/o)	AGS Ioannina
Esperos Lamias	20 – 0 (w/o)	MGS Gefiras
Niki Volos	67 – 89	Vikos Ioannina
Stavroupoli EK	93 – 83	Anagennisi Karditas
Panserraikos	54 – 52	Doxa Lefkadas
Lefkippos Xanthis	60 – 83	DEKA
Ermis Lagada	71 – 74	Trikala Basket
Proteas Grevenon	56 – 62	Filippos Verias

==== Round 2 (National League 2 South) ====
KAP Agias Paraskevis	84 – 74	GS Koropiou
Kronos Agiou Dimitriou	76 – 71	Argonaftis Triglias Rafinas
Near East	82 – 57	Ergotelis
Poseidon Neou Psychikou	72 – 55	AO Ermionidas
Dion Kiparissias	81 – 79	Eleftheria Moschatou

==== Round 2 (National League 2 North) ====
GAS Vassilikon Thessalonikis	70 – 44	Ethnikos Kozanis
PAOK Mesopotamias Kastorias	61 – 63	Ioannina BC
Titanes Palama	83 – 70	Koupa Kilkis
GS Almirou	69 – 79	GS Sofadon

==== Round 2 (National League 1 South) ====
Ethnikos Piraeus	58 – 81	Proteas Voulas
Panionios	20 – 0 (w/o)	AO Ahagia 82
Pagrati	70 – 83	Milon
Panelefsiniakos	89 – 70	Esperos Kallitheas
APAS Ta Fanaria Naxou	64 – 71	Nea Kifissia

==== Round 2 (National League 1 North) ====
Stavroupoli EK	75 – 67	H.A.N.T.H.
Panserraikos	73 – 47	PS Efkarpias
DEKA	64 – 57	Trikala Basket
Vikos Ioannina	82 – 88	Esperos Lamias

==== Round 3 (National League 2) ====
Poseidon Neou Psychikou	89 – 96	Kronos Agiou Dimitriou
Dion Kiparissias	70 – 78	Near East
Ioannina BC	81 – 74	GAS Vassilikon Thessalonikis
GS Sofadon	73 – 67	Titanes Palama
KAP Agias Paraskevis	72 – 69	AO Trikala

=== Phase 2 ===
==== Round 1 ====
Esperos Lamias	75 – 89	Panerythraikos
Iraklis	20 – 0 (w/o)	Charilaos Trikoupis Messolonghi
Near East	58 – 89	F.E.A. N.F. N.CH.
Ermis Schimatariou	84 – 83	Psychiko
Kronos Agiou Dimitriou	66 – 79	Aias Evosmou
Ioannina BC	60 – 73	Kavala
Panionios	84 – 70	Koroivos Amaliadas
KAP Agias Paraskevis	71 – 67	Panelefsiniakos
Papagou	90 – 88	Maroussi
Proteas Voulas	67 – 74	AO Agriniou
Filippos Verias	0 – 20 (w/o)	GS Eleftheroupolis
Stavroupoli EK	20 – 0 (w/o)	AO Triton
Panserraikos	60 – 49	DEKA
Milon	62 – 85	NE Megaridas
GS Sofadon	0 – 20 (w/o)	Amyntas

==== Round 2 ====
Nea Kifisia	70 – 86	Amyntas
KAP Agias Paraskevis	43 – 82	F.E.A. N.F. N.CH.
Panserraikos	75 – 82	GS Eleftheroupolis
Stavroupoli EK	60 – 84	Iraklis
Panionios	78 – 77	NE Megaridas
Papagou	104 – 96	AO Agriniou
Aias Evosmou	83 – 59	Kavala
Ermis Schimatariou	95 – 97	Panerythraikos

==== Round 3 ====
Aias Evosmou	80 – 87	F.E.A. N.F. N.CH.
Iraklis	74 – 68	Panerythraikos
Panionios	85 – 83	Amyntas
Papagou	20 – 0 (w/o)	GS Eleftheroupolis

=== UNICEF Trophy Final Four ===
Semifinals; 5 January 2024
Panionios	83
Iraklis	73
FEA Neas Filadelfeias	89
Papagou	77

Final; 6 January 2024
Panionios	80
FEA Neas Filadelfeias	71

source: EOKallstarbasket.gr

== Final 8 ==
Quarterfinals; 16–17 February 2023
Panionios	88
AEK	93
Peristeri bwin	77
PAOK mateco	64
Olympiacos	82
Aris	51
Panathinaikos OPAP	87
Kolossos H Hotels	80

Semifinals; 18 February 2023
AEK	65
Peristeri bwin	77
Olympiacos	81
Panathinaikos OPAP	65

Final; 19 February 2023
Peristeri bwin	57
Olympiacos	85

== Final ==
19 February 2023	Olympiacos	85–57	Peristeri
19:15	Scoring by quarter: 26–10, 19–11, 23–13, 17–23
	Pts: Peters 26; Vezenkov 20; Rebs: Bolomboy 8 Asts: Walkup 5 Vezenkov 5	Boxscore	Pts: Moraitis 16; Rebs: Chougkaz4; Francisco 4 Asts: Hummer 5 Moraitis 3	Arena: Heraklion Indoor Sports Arena; Referees: Poursanidis; Pitsilkas; Theonas

== Awards ==
=== Finals Most Valuable Player ===
Player	Team
(Bulgaria) (Greece) Sasha Vezenkov	Olympiacos

=== Finals Top Scorer ===
Player	Team
(United States) (Bosnia and Herzegovina) Alec Peters	Olympiacos
