= 2023–24 Greek Basketball Cup =

2023–24 Greek Cup
- Season: 2023–24
- Duration: 13 September 2023 – 18 February 2024
- Teams: 96

Finals
- Champions: Olympiacos (12th title)
- Runners-up: Panathinaikos
- Finals MVP: (France) Moustapha Fall

Awards
- Final MVP: (France) Moustapha Fall

Statistical leaders
Points	(France) Mathias Lessort	16.5
Rebounds	(France) Moustapha Fall	6.4
Assists	(United States) Thomas Walkup	4.8

The 2023–24 Greek Basketball Cup was the 49th edition of Greek top-tier level professional domestic basketball cup competition. The previous winner of the cup was Olympiacos. The cup competition started on 13 September 2023 and ended on 18 February 2024. Olympiacos won the competition.

== Format ==
The top seven placed teams from the top-tier level Greek Basket League's 2022–23 season, gained an automatic bye to the 2023–24 Greek Cup Final 8. While the remaining teams from the 2022–23 Greek Basket League season were eliminated from the 2023–24 Greek Cup tournament.

The eighth and last 2023–24 Greek Cup team was Panionios, the winner of the Greek UNICEF Trophy, which was contested between the teams from the Greek 2nd Division Elite League, the Greek 3rd Division National League 1, and the Greek 4th Division National League 2.

== Qualification tournament ==
=== Phase 1 ===
==== Round 1 (National League 2) ====
Glafkos Esperos Patras	72 – 79	Eleftheria Moschatou
Kronos Agiou Dimitriou	91 – 74	OAA Iraklio
Argos Orestiko	71 – 67	Koupa Kilkis
Asteras Temenis	61 – 89	Doukas
Akadimia Elefsinas	76 – 71	AO Pefkis
Olympos Eleftheriou	66 – 65	Roupel Sidirokastrou
Ermis Argyroupolis	75 – 82	Holargos
Argonaftis Neas Kiou	45 – 61	Agia Paraskevi
GS Gargalianon	66 – 79	AS Pera
GS Ilioupolis	84 – 78	Agioi Anargyroi
Doxa Pyrrou Artas	86 – 62	Nauarchos Votsis

==== Round 1 (National League 1) ====
AO Dafnis	72 – 70	Ethnikos Piraeus
Nea Kifisia	87 – 81	Anagennisi Arkalochoriou
NEO Lixouriou	92 – 67	Esperos Kallitheas
APAS Ta Fanaria Naxou	88 – 62	EFAO Zografou
FEA Neas Filadelfias-Neas Chalkidonas	54 – 85	Aiolos Agyias
Ethnikos Livadeias	66 – 58	Panelefsiniakos
Proteas Voulas	76 – 57	Panellinios
Lefkippos Xanthis	89 – 72	Proteas Grevenon
Vikos Ioannina	91 – 73	KAO Dramas

==== Round 2 (National League 2) ====
Kronos Agiou Dimitriou	67 – 88	Holargos
Agia Paraskevi	64 – 68	Akadimia Elefsinas
AS Pera	66 – 90	Doukas
EN.KAL. Stavroupolis	63 – 60	Argos Orestiko
Dafni Dafniou	76 – 86	GS Ilioupolis
Ioannina BC	56 – 64	Agia Varvara
GS Almirou	88 – 69	Doxa Pyrrou Artas

==== Round 2 (National League 1) ====
NEO Lixouriou	57 – 63	Nea Kifisia
Aiolos Agyias	70 – 75	APAS Ta Fanaria Naxou
Palaio Faliro	76 – 63	AO Dafnis
Proteas Voulas	79 – 75	Ethnikos Livadeias

==== Round 3 (National League 2) ====
GS Ilioupolis	68 – 66	Akadimia Elefsinas
GS Almirou	77 – 49	EN.KAL. Stavroupolis
Olympos Eleftheriou	80 – 81	Agia Varvara
Doukas	83 – 76	Eleftheria Moschatou

=== Phase 2 ===
==== Round 1 ====
Lefkippos Xanthis	73 – 80	Nea Kifisia
Holargos	89 – 84	Proteas Voulas
GS Ilioupolis	63 – 86	Trikala Basket
Doxa Lefkadas	20 – 0 (w/o)	Iraklis
Agia Varvara	59 – 107	Papagou
GS Almirou	63 – 93	NE Megaridas
H.A.N.TH.	68 – 89	Ermis Schimatariou
Palaio Faliro	77 – 81	Koroivos Amaliadas
Psychiko	81 – 84	Esperos Lamias
GS Eleftheroupolis	83 – 71	Aias Evosmou
Panionios	86 – 63	Panerythraikos
GAS Komotini	70 – 72	Amyntas
Panserraikos	43 – 66	Milon
Vikos Ioannina	73 – 92	APAS Ta Fanaria Naxou
Doukas	70 – 98	AO Mykonou

==== Round 2 ====
Holargos	73 – 79	Milon
Nea Kifisia	75 – 76	Amyntas
Trikala Basket	63 – 67	Doxa Lefkadas
AO Mykonou	78 – 74	Esperos Lamias
Ermis Schimatariou	80 – 90	Panionios
Koroivos Amaliadas	84 – 87	Papagou
APAS Ta Fanaria Naxou	66 – 72	NE Megaridas

==== Round 3 ====
AO Mykonou	70 – 72	NE Megaridas
Panionios	88 – 83	Papagou
Amyntas	76 – 84	Doxa Lefkadas
Milon	88 – 67	GS Eleftheroupolis

=== UNICEF Trophy Final Four ===
Semifinals; 5 January 2024
Panionios	61
Doxa Lefkadas	46
NE Megaridas	81
Milon	72

Final; 6 January 2024
NE Megaridas	63
Panionios	66

source: EOK

== Final 8 ==
Quarterfinals; 15–16 February 2024
Panathinaikos	79
AEK	72
PAOK	74
Aris	76
Olympiacos	87
Peristeri	68
Promitheas	88
Panionios	48

Semifinals; 17 February 2024
Panathinaikos	76
Aris	65
Olympiacos	91
Promitheas	77

Final; 18 February 2024
Panathinaikos	58
Olympiacos	69

== Final ==
18 February 2024	Panathinaikos	58–69	Olympiacos
19:00	Scoring by quarter: 12–14, 13–16, 14–17, 19–22
	Pts: Mitoglou 16; Lessort 12; Rebs: Mitoglou 7 Asts: Grant 5 Nunn 4	Boxscore	Pts: Fall 13; Wright 13; Rebs: Fall 7 Wright 6 Asts: Papanikolaou 5 Larentzakis 4	Arena: Heraklion Indoor Sports Arena; Referees: Papapetrou; Karpanos; Katrachouras

== Awards ==
=== Finals Most Valuable Player ===
Player	Team
(France) Moustapha Fall	Olympiacos

=== Finals Top Scorer ===
Player	Team
(Greece) Dinos Mitoglou	Panathinaikos
