= Nikos Michalos =

Greek basketball player (born 1977)

Pagrati
- League: Greek A2 League

Personal information
- Born: May 21, 1977 (age 49) Maroussi, Athens, Greece
- Listed height: 6 ft 3.75 in (1.92 m)
- Listed weight: 190 lb (86 kg)

Career information
- NBA draft: 1999: undrafted
- Playing career: 1995–present
- Position: Point guard / shooting guard

Career history
- 1995–1997: Peiraikos Syndesmos
- 1997–1998: Olympiacos
- 1998–1999: Panionios
- 1999–2000: Esperos Kallitheas
- 2000–2002: Milon
- 2002–2003: Esperos Kallitheas
- 2003–2004: AGE Chalkida
- 2004–2005: Palaio Faliro
- 2005–2006: Milon
- 2006–2007: Doukas
- 2007–2008: Keravnos Aigio
- 2008–2010: Near East
- 2010–2011: Pagrati
- 2011–2012: Ermis Peramatos
- 2012–2013: Aigaleo
- 2013–2015: Papagou
- 2015–2017: Panionios
- 2018–2019: Ethnikos Piraeus
- 2019–present: Pagrati

Career highlights
- Greek 2nd Division Top Scorer (2002); Greek 2nd Division champion (2017)

Nikolaos "Nikos" Michalos (alternate spelling: Mihalos) (Greek: Νικόλαος "Νίκος" Μίχαλος; born May 21, 1977, in Maroussi, Athens, Greece) is a Greek former professional basketball player. At a height of 1.92 m (6'3 3/4") tall, he played at the point guard and shooting guard positions.

== Professional career ==
In his pro career, Michalos played in the top-tier level Greek Basket League, with Peiraikos Syndesmos, Olympiacos, Panionios, Esperos Kallitheas, and Milon. While with Olympiacos, he played in the 1997 McDonald's Championship Final, against the Chicago Bulls. As a member of Panionios, he played in the European-wide 3rd-tier level FIBA Korać Cup, during the 1998–99 season.

Late in his career, he became the team captain of Panionios. He joined Ethnikos Piraeus in 2018.

== National team career ==
Michalos was a member of the junior national teams of Greece. He played at the 1998 FIBA Europe Under-20 Championship.

== Personal life ==
Michalos' father, Takis Michalos, was a Greek professional water polo player and coach.
