= Ioannis Demertzis =

Ioannis Demertzis May refer to:

- Ioannis Demertzis (basketball) (born 1983), Greek basketball player
- Ioannis Demertzis (Macedonian fighter), Greek Macedonian chieftain
