= Agia Paraskevi B.C. =

Agia Paraskevi B.C. may refer to:

- GS Agia Paraskevi, a Greek women's basketball club, founded in 1976, based in Agia Paraskevi
- Basketball Agia Paraskevi, a Greek men's basketball club, founded in 1986, based in Agia Paraskevi
