= Manolis Mataliotakis =

Greek basketball player (born 1994)

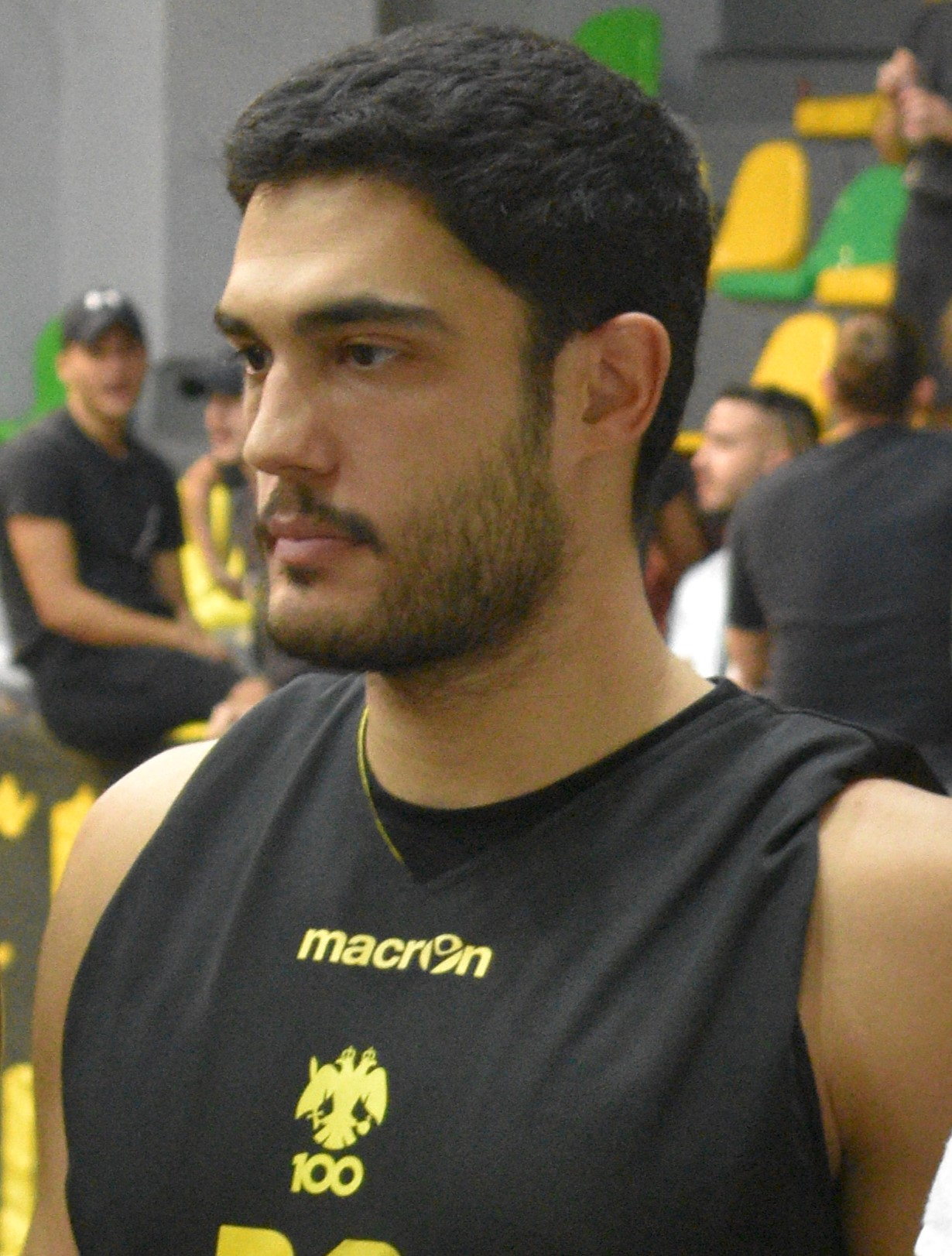
- Mataliotakis with AEK Athens in 2023

Lavrio
- Position: Power forward
- League: Greek A2 Elite League

Personal information
- Born: January 14, 1994 (age 32) Athens, Greece
- Listed height: 6 ft 7.5 in (2.02 m)
- Listed weight: 205 lb (93 kg)

Career information
- Playing career: 2015–present

Career history
- 2015–2017: Kronos Agiou Dimitriou
- 2017–2019: Proteas Voulas
- 2019–2020: Esperos Kallitheas
- 2020–2021: Pagrati
- 2021: Charilaos Trikoupis
- 2021–2022: Psychiko
- 2022–2023: Panerithraikos
- 2023–2024: AEK
- 2024–2025: Doxa Lefkadas
- 2025: Mykonos
- 2025–present: Lavrio

Career highlights
- Greek A2 Elite League champion (2025)

Manolis "Manos" Mataliotakis (Greek: Μανώλης"Μάνος" Ματαλιωτάκης; born January 14, 1994) is a Greek professional basketball player. He is a 2.02 m (6 ft 8 in) tall power forward.

== Professional career ==
On 1 August 2021, Mataliotakis joined Charilaos Trikoupis of the Greek A2 Basket League for the 2021–22 season.

After leaving the club following the dismissal of coach Dinos Kalampakos, Mataliotakis joined fellow second-tier team Psychiko on 23 November of the same year.

On October 7, 2022, he signed with Panerithraikos of the Greek second division.

On October 2, 2023, he joined AEK Athens of the Greek Basket League following a successful tryout.

On August 18, he joined Lavrio of the Greek A2 Elite League.
