= Dinos Kalampakos =

Greek basketball player and coach

Doxa Lefkadas
- Title: Head coach
- League: Greek A2 Basket League

Personal information
- Born: November 14, 1964 (age 62) Athens, Greece

Career information
- Playing career: 1979–1998
- Position: Shooting guard
- Coaching career: 1999–present

Career history

Playing
- 1979–1990: Pagrati
- 1990–1992: Panathinaikos
- 1992–1994: Sporting
- 1994–1996: Pagrati
- 1996–1997: Ampelokipoi
- 1997–1998: Pagrati

Coaching
- 1999–2000: Pagrati (assistant)
- 2000–2006: Platonas Schools
- 2006–2008: Gyzikos
- 2008–2009: ICBS
- 2009–2012: Peramatos Ermis
- 2012: Polis Kallitheas
- 2012–2013: Papagou
- 2013–2016: Pagrati
- 2016–2018: Koroivos Amaliadas
- 2019–2021: Charilaos Trikoupis
- 2021–2022: Keravnos
- 2022–2023: Agrinio
- 2023–present: Doxa Lefkadas

Career highlights
- As head coach: Greek 2nd Division champion (2020); Greek 2nd Division Coach of the Year (2016)

Dinos Kalampakos (alternate spelling: Kalabakos) (Greek: Ντίνος Καλαμπάκος; born November 14, 1964) is a Greek former professional basketball player and current basketball coach for Doxa Lefkadas of the Greek A2 Basket League. Kalampakos spent the bulk of his club playing career with the Greek team Pagrati.

== Early years ==
Kalampakos was born in Athens, Greece, on 14 November 1964. At a young age, he began playing youth club basketball with the junior teams of Pagrati.

== Professional career ==
Kalampakos first played with the senior men's team of Pagrati in 1979, at the age of 14. He stayed with Pagrati until 1990, and with the club he managed to gain a league promotion up to the top-tier level Greek Basket League. During that season, he was the team's second best scorer, behind Earl Harrison, with a scoring average of 20.4 points per game.

In 1990, Kalampakos transferred to the Greek club Panathinaikos, where he played until 1992. Over the next two seasons, Kalampakos played with the Greek club Sporting. In 1994, he returned to Pagrati, where he stayed until 1996. Kalampakos spent the 1996–97 season with Ampelokipoi, before finishing his club playing career with Pagrati, in the 1997–98 season.

== Coaching career ==
Kalampakos began his coaching career with the Greek club Pagrati, in the 1999–00 season, working as the assistant coach of Giorgos Nikolopoulos. From 2000 to 2006, he worked as the head coach of Platonas Schools, where he trained players like Nikos Gkikas, Ioannis Dimakos, Spyros Motsenigos, and Dimitris Cheilaris. In 2008, he became the head coach of ICBS. He continued in this role after the club merged with Peramatos Ermis.

During the 2012–13 season, Kalampakos was the head coach of Polis Kallitheas and Papagou, before returning to Pagrati's head coaching position. He stayed with Pagrati until 2016. In 2016, Kalampakos was hired to be the head coach of Koroivos Amaliadas, of the Greek Basket League. He left Koroivos the summer of 2018, after the relegation of the team in Elite Basket (A2).

After that, he worked as the technical director of Ionikos Nikaias, before he became the head coach of Charilaos Trikoupis.
