= Kendrick Johnson =

Kendrick Johnson may refer to:

- Kendrick Johnson (basketball) (born 1975), American basketball player
- Death of Kendrick Johnson (1995–2013), American student found dead at his high school

== See also ==
- Helen Kendrick Johnson (1844–1917), American writer, poet, and activist
- Ken "Snakehips" Johnson (Kenrick Johnson, 1914–1941), Guianan-British band leader and dancer
