= Semeyavia =

Airline of Kazakhstan

Semeyavia Семейавиа
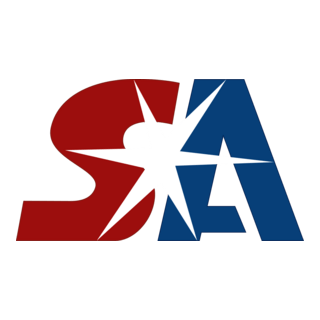
IATA	ICAO	Call sign
E8	SMK	-
- Founded: between 1991 and 1997
- Ceased operations: 2013
- Operating bases: Semey Airport
- Fleet size: 3
- Destinations: 2
- Headquarters: Semey, Kazakhstan

Semeyavia O.A. (Kazakh: Семейавиа, sometimes also transcribed Semeiavia) was an airline based in Semey, Kazakhstan, operating scheduled domestic flights between its home base at Semey Airport and Almaty International Airport. Ceased operations in July 2013.

== Fleet ==
As Semeyavia is on the List of air carriers banned in the European Union due to safety concerns arising from its ageing fleet of Yakovlev Yak-40 aircraft, the company decided to renew its fleet with Embraer ERJ-145 aircraft, the first of which (formerly having belonged to now-defunct Athens Airways) was delivered in December 2010. Thus, the Semeyavia fleet currently consists of the following aircraft:

Semeyavia fleet
Aircraft	In Fleet	Orders	Passengers
Embraer ERJ 145	1	1	44
Yakovlev Yak-40	2	0	30

== Incidents ==
On 19 February 1997, a Semeyavia Yakovlev Yak-40 (aircraft registration UN-87233) overshot the runway upon landing at Semey Airport following a scheduled domestic passenger flight. There were no fatalities amongst the 14 passengers and 4 crew members on board, but the aircraft was damaged beyond repair.
