= Panagiotis Nikolakopoulos =

Greek basketball player

Panagioris Nikolakopoulos
No. 6 – Panionios
- Position: Shooting guard / small forward
- League: Greek League

Personal information
- Born: August 24, 1994 (age 32) Athens, Greece
- Listed height: 6 ft 5 in (1.96 m)
- Listed weight: 200 lb (91 kg)

Career information
- Playing career: 2013–present

Career history
- 2013–2014: Pagrati
- 2014–2015: Ilysiakos
- 2015–2016: Lavrio
- 2016–present: Panionios

Career highlights
- Greek 2nd Division champion (2017)

Panagiotis Nikolakopoulos (Greek: Παναγιώτης Νικολακόπουλος; born August 24, 1994, in Athens, Greece is a Greek professional basketball player who currently plays for Panionios. He is a 6'5" (1.96 m) tall swingman.

== Professional career ==
After playing youth basketball with the junior clubs of Panathinaikos and Koroivos Amaliadas, Nikolakopoulos began his professional career in 2013, with the Greek 2nd Division club Pagrati. In 2014, he joined Ilysiakos. In 2015, he moved to the Greek First Division club Lavrio.
