= Kostas Keramidas =

Greek basketball coach

Personal information
- Born: 21 March 1965 (age 61) Athens, Greece
- Position: Head coach
- Coaching career: 1996–present

Career history

Coaching
- 1996–1997: Agia Paraskevi Women
- 1997–1999: Akadimia 75 Women
- 1999–2001: Greece Under-21
- 2001: Greece Women Under-21 (Assistant)
- 2001–2003: Maroussi (Assistant)
- 2002–2003: Esperides Kallitheas Women
- 2003–2004: Ionikos NF (Assistant)
- 2004–2006: Aigaleo
- 2005: Greece Under-21
- 2005: Greece (Assistant)
- 2007: Apollon Patras
- 2007: Asteras Exarchion Women
- 2007–2008: Panathinaikos Women
- 2008–2009: Aigaleo
- 2009–2010: Agia Paraskevi
- 2011: Sporting Athens Women
- 2011–2012: Asteras Exarchion Women
- 2012–2013: Solna Vikings Women
- 2013–2015: Athinaikos Women
- 2015–2019: Maroussi
- 2015–present: Greece Women
- 2019: Ermis Agias

Konstantinos "Kostas" Keramidas (Greek: Κωνσταντίνος "Κώστας" Κεραμιδάς; 21 March 1965, Athens) is a Greek professional basketball coach.

== Club coaching career ==
During his coaching career, Keramidas has been the head coach of numerous basketball clubs, in both men's and women's professional leagues.

== National team coaching career ==
Keramidas is currently the head coach of the women's basketball club of Panserraikos of the A1 Greek league . In the past he has worked as the head coach of the senior Greek women's national basketball team. Most notably, he coached Greece at the 2017 EuroBasket Women, and at the 2018 FIBA World Cup Women.
