= Andrianos Perdikaris =

Greek basketball player

Adrianos Perdikaris Αδριανός Περδικάρης
Ethnikos Piraeus
- Position: Power forward
- League: Greek 2nd Division

Personal information
- Born: October 24, 1991 (age 35) Holargos, Greece
- Listed height: 6 ft 8 in (2.03 m)
- Listed weight: 218 lb (99 kg)

Career information
- College: Franklin Pierce (2010–2014)
- NBA draft: 2014: undrafted
- Playing career: 2014–present

Career history
- 2014–2015: Ilysiakos
- 2015–2016: Doukas
- 2016–2017: Ionikos Nikaias
- 2017–2018: Agia Paraskevi
- 2018–present: Ethnikos Piraeus

Adrianos Perdikaris Vourliotakis (Greek: Αδριανός Περδικάρης; born October 24, 1991, in Athens, Greece) is a Greek basketball player. He is 6'9' (2.05) tall Power forward.

== Professional career ==
Perdikaris start his professional career with Ilysiakos in 2014. In 2015, he signed with Lavrio.

On October 5, 2018, he joined Ethnikos Piraeus of the Greek 2nd Division.
