= Alekos Kontovounisios =

Greek basketball player and coach

Alekos Kontovounisios (Greek: Αλέκος Κοντοβουνήσιος; 3 November 1937 – 14 July 2025) was a Greek basketball guard-forward and later coach whose ball-handling virtuosity earned him the nickname "o Zogklér" ("the Juggler").

== Early life and education ==
Kontovounisios was born in central Athens to a father from Kyparissia in the Peloponnese and a mother from the Aegean island of Samos. He attended the 13th Boys' Gymnasium of Gouva before graduating from the Palaio Faliro High School in 1956.

In November 1952, aged fifteen, he was spotted on a makeshift court near the Panathenaic Stadium by mathematics teacher and talent-scout Notis Mastroyiannis, who immediately registered him with A.E. Pagkratiou.

== Playing career ==
Pagkrati (1952–1961) provided his launch-pad, but his prime came with ambitious Triton (1961–1967), where under coach Mplouïs Diakakis he became the A Ethniki’s fifth-leading scorer in 1965–66 with 421 points in 18 games. Returning to Pagkrati (1967–1974), he closed his club career and made a late cameo for Palaio Faliro in 1982.

Internationally, Kontovounisios debuted for Greece in 1959, wore the captain's armband for much of the 1960s and finished with 67 caps and 188 points. He took part in the 1960 pre-Olympic tournament at Bologna and the EuroBasket events of 1961 (Belgrade) and 1965 (Moscow), while also helping the side to fourth place at the 1963 Balkan Games in the Panathenaic Stadium. He doubled as a setter for the national volleyball team, appearing in friendlies against Romania (1957) and on tour in Egypt (1959).

== Coaching ==
Soon after retiring in 1974, he moved into coaching, guiding youth and senior squads of Pagkrati and Aigaleo while attending clinics led by Hubie Brown, Bobby Knight and Pat Riley. Away from basketball he worked for the Lanaras textile group (1963-66) and then the Public Power Corporation (ΔΕΗ) until his 1992 retirement.

== Personal life ==
Kontovounisios married British teacher Susie Green and in the late 1990s the couple settled in England, though he frequently returned to Athens for veterans' events.
