= Ioannis Dimakos =

Greek basketball player

Ioannis Dimakos Ιωάννης Δημάκος
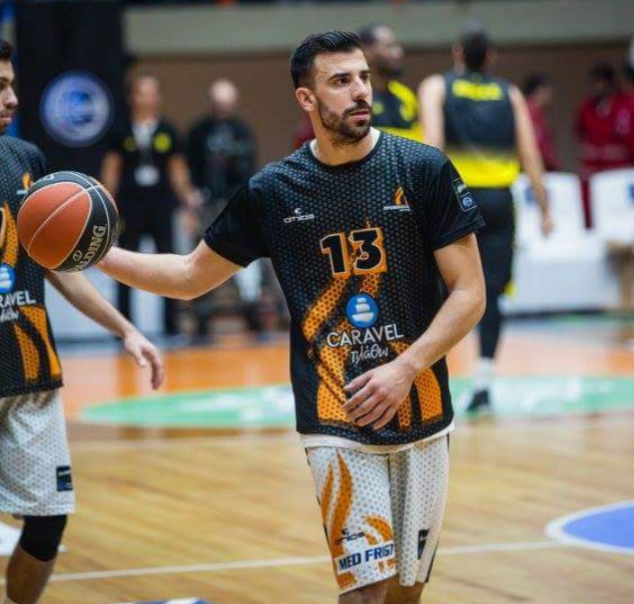
- Dimakos in action with Promitheas Patras BC.

Personal information
- Born: September 14, 1990 (age 36) Corinthia, Greece
- Listed height: 6 ft 4.5 in (1.94 m)
- Listed weight: 210 lb (95 kg)

Career information
- NBA draft: 2012: undrafted
- Playing career: 2009–present
- Position: Shooting guard

Career history
- 2009–2010: Aigaleo
- 2010–2012: Pagrati
- 2012–2014: Panelefsiniakos
- 2014–2016: Psychiko
- 2016–2017: Faros Keratsiniou
- 2017–2018: Promitheas Patras
- 2018–2019: Kolossos Rodou
- 2019–2020: Ionikos Nikaias
- 2020–2022: Eleftheroupoli Kavalas
- 2022–2024: Milon

Career highlights
- Greek A2 Elite League champion (2024); Greek Second Division Top Scorer (2015)

Ioannis "Giannis" Dimakos (Greek: Ιωάννης "Γιάννης" Δημάκος; born September 14, 1990) is a Greek professional basketball player. He is a 6 ft 4 1/2 in (1.94 m) tall shooting guard.

== Professional career ==
After spending the 2008–09 season in the semi-pro Greek 3rd-tier level B League team, Ikaros Kallitheas, Dimakos started his pro career with Aigaleo, during the 2009–10 season, playing in the Greek 2nd Division. For the next two years, Dimakos played with Pagrati in the Greek 2nd Division.

In the 2011–12 season, he had a very good season in the Greek 2nd Division, averaging 16.0 points, 3.7 rebounds, 2.1 assists, and 1.1 steals per game. His performance with Pagrati, garnered interest from the top-tier level Greek League team Rethymno Aegean.

In 2012, he signed with the Greek 1st Division club Panelefsiniakos. In 2014, after two years playing with Panelefsiniakos in the Greek 1st Division, he signed with the Greek 2nd Division club Psychiko. In his first year with Psychiko (2014–15 Greek 2nd Division season), he was the Greek A2 League's Top Scorer, averaging 19.5 points per game.

In 2015, he renewed his contract with Psychiko. On July 10, 2016, Dimakos signed with Faros Keratsiniou of the Greek A2 League. On June 7, 2017, Dimakos signed with Promitheas Patras of the top-tier level Greek Basket League, returning to the top league of the Greek Basket system after 3 years.

On July 19, 2018, Dimakos signed with Kolossos Rodou. On July 31, 2019, Dimakos returned to Athens and signed with newly promoted Ionikos Nikaias.

== Awards and accomplishments ==
- Greek Second Division: Top Scorer (2015)
