= Stavros Toutziarakis =

Greek basketball player (born 1987)

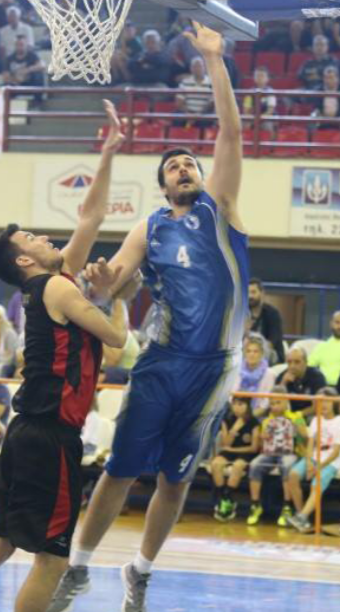
- Toutziarakis with Kymis in 2016

Ermis Schimatari
- Position: Center
- League: Greek A2 Elite League

Personal information
- Born: November 5, 1987 (age 39) Florina, Greece
- Listed height: 6 ft 10.75 in (2.10 m)
- Listed weight: 245 lb (111 kg)

Career information
- NBA draft: 2009: undrafted
- Playing career: 2006–present

Career history
- 2006–2007: Makedonikos
- 2007–2009: Maroussi
- 2009–2010: AEK Athens
- 2010–2011: Ikaros Kallitheas-Esperos
- 2011–2012: OFI
- 2012–2014: Solna Vikings
- 2014–2015: MAFC
- 2015–2017: Kymis
- 2017: Al Sadd Doha
- 2017–2018: Promitheas Patras
- 2018–2019: Kymis
- 2019–2020: Kolossos Rodou
- 2020–2021: Ionikos Nikaias
- 2021–2022: Trepça
- 2022–2023: Eleftheroupoli Kavalas
- 2023: Neaniki Estia Megaridas
- 2023–2024: Al Ahli Doha
- 2024–present: Ermis Schimatari

Career highlights
- Greek A2 Elite League champion (2016); Greek A2 Elite League MVP (2016); Greek A2 Elite League Top Rebounder (2023)
Medals
Men's basketball
Representing Greece
Mediterranean Games
Silver medal – second place	2009 Pescara	Under-26

Stavros Toutziarakis (Greek: Σταύρος Τουτζιαράκης; born November 5, 1987) is a Greek professional basketball player for Ermis Schimatari of the Greek A2 Elite League. He is 2.10 m (6'10 3/4") tall, and he plays at the center position.

== Professional career ==
Toutziarakis started his amateur level career with Aristotelis Florinas, where he stayed from 1999 to 2002. He then played with Mantoulidis until 2006, when he signed his first pro level contract with Makedonikos. In 2007, he signed with the EuroCup side Maroussi, where he stayed for two seasons.

In 2009, Totziarakis moved to AEK Athens where he played for one season, being a choice of AEK's head coach at the time, Kostas Flevarakis. In the following two seasons, Toutziarakis played with Ikaros Kallitheas-Esperos and OFI. After that, joined the Solna Vikings in 2012.

In 2014, he signed with MAFC of the Hungarian League. On May 30, 2015, he returned to Greece, and joined Kymi of the Greek 2nd Division. He was voted the Greek 2nd Division's MVP in 2016. In his comeback to the Greek Basket League with Kymis, Toutziarakis had a good season, and in 24 games played, he averaged 10.7 points, 6.2 rebounds, and 1 assist per game.

After two years with Kymi, in April 2017, he moved to Al Sadd Doha of the Qatari Basketball League, until the end of the season, being coached there by Manos Manouselis. On June 21, 2017, Toutziarakis joined Promitheas Patras of the Greek Basket League. With Promitheas, he finished in the 3rd place in the regular season of the Greek Basket League.

After one year with Promitheas, Toutziarakis returned to Kymi on June 19, 2018. With Kymi, he eventually became the team captain. On August 15, 2019, Toutziarakis signed with Kolossos Rodou. On October 25, 2020, Toutziarakis signed with Ionikos Nikaias.

On June 15, 2024, he joined Ermis Schimatari of the Greek A2 Elite League.

== National team career ==
Toutziarakis was a member of the junior national teams of Greece. With Greece's junior national teams, he played at the following tournaments: the 2003 FIBA Europe Under-16 Championship, the 2004 FIBA Europe Under-18 Championship, the 2005 FIBA Europe Under-18 Championship, the 2006 FIBA Europe Under-20 Championship, and the 2007 FIBA Europe Under-20 Championship. With Greece's under-26 national team, he won the silver medal at the 2009 Mediterranean Games.
