= Peramatos Ermis B.C. =

Peramatos Ermis
- Founded: 1978
- History: 1978–1998; GS Peramatos; 1998–Present; G.S. Peramatos Ermis B.C.
- Arena: Perama Indoor
- Location: Perama, Piraeus, Athens, Greece
- Team colors: Red and Blue
- Website: gsperamatosermis.gr
Home	Away

Peramatos Ermis B.C. is a Greek professional basketball team that was founded in 1978. The team is based in the Perama, Piraeus, Athens, Greece.

== History ==
Peramatos Ermis absorbed ICBS in 2009, through a merger. ICBS had previously competed in the Greek 2nd Division.

== Notable players ==
Note: Flags indicate national team eligibility at FIBA-sanctioned events. Players may hold other non-FIBA nationalities not displayed.

Criteria

To appear in this section a player must have either:

- Set a club record or won an individual award while at the club
- Played at least one official international match for their national team at any time
- Played at least one official NBA match at any time.

- (Greece) Nikos Michalos
- (Greece) Nikos Liakopoulos

== Head coaches ==
- (Greece) Dinos Kalampakos
