= Christos Petrodimopoulos =

Greek basketball player

Aigaleo
- Position: Power forward / center

Personal information
- Born: December 25, 1980 (age 45) Xanthi, Greece
- Listed height: 6 ft 10 in (2.08 m)
- Listed weight: 240 lb (109 kg)

Career information
- Playing career: 1998–present

Career history
- 1998–2001: Panionios
- 2001–2002: G.S. Larissas
- 2002–2004: OFI
- 2004–2005: Irakleio
- 2005–2006: ICBS
- 2006–2007: Kolossos Rodou
- 2007–2009: Dafni
- 2009–2011: Ikaros Kallitheas
- 2011–2014: Nea Kifissia
- 2014–2017: Faros Keratsiniou
- 2017–2019: Ionikos Nikaias
- 2019–2020: Diagoras Dryopideon
- 2020–present: Aigaleo

Career highlights
- 3× Greek 2nd Division champion (2010, 2013, 2019); Greek 3rd Division champion (2018)

Christos Petrodimopoulos (Greek: Χρήστος Πετροδημόπουλος; born December 25, 1980) is a Greek professional basketball player. He is a 2.08 m (6 ft 10 in) tall power forward / center.

== Professional career ==
In his pro career, some of the clubs Petrodimopoulos has played with in the top-tier level Greek Basket League include Panionios, Ikaros Kallitheas, and Nea Kifissia. He also played with Faros Keratsiniou, and with Faros, he qualified to the finals of the 2016 Greek Cup.

== National team career ==
Petrodimopoulos was a member of the junior national teams of Greece. With Greece's junior national team, he played at the 2000 FIBA Europe Under-20 Championship.
