= Agia Paraskevi =

Agia Paraskevi Αγία Παρασκευή
- Municipality
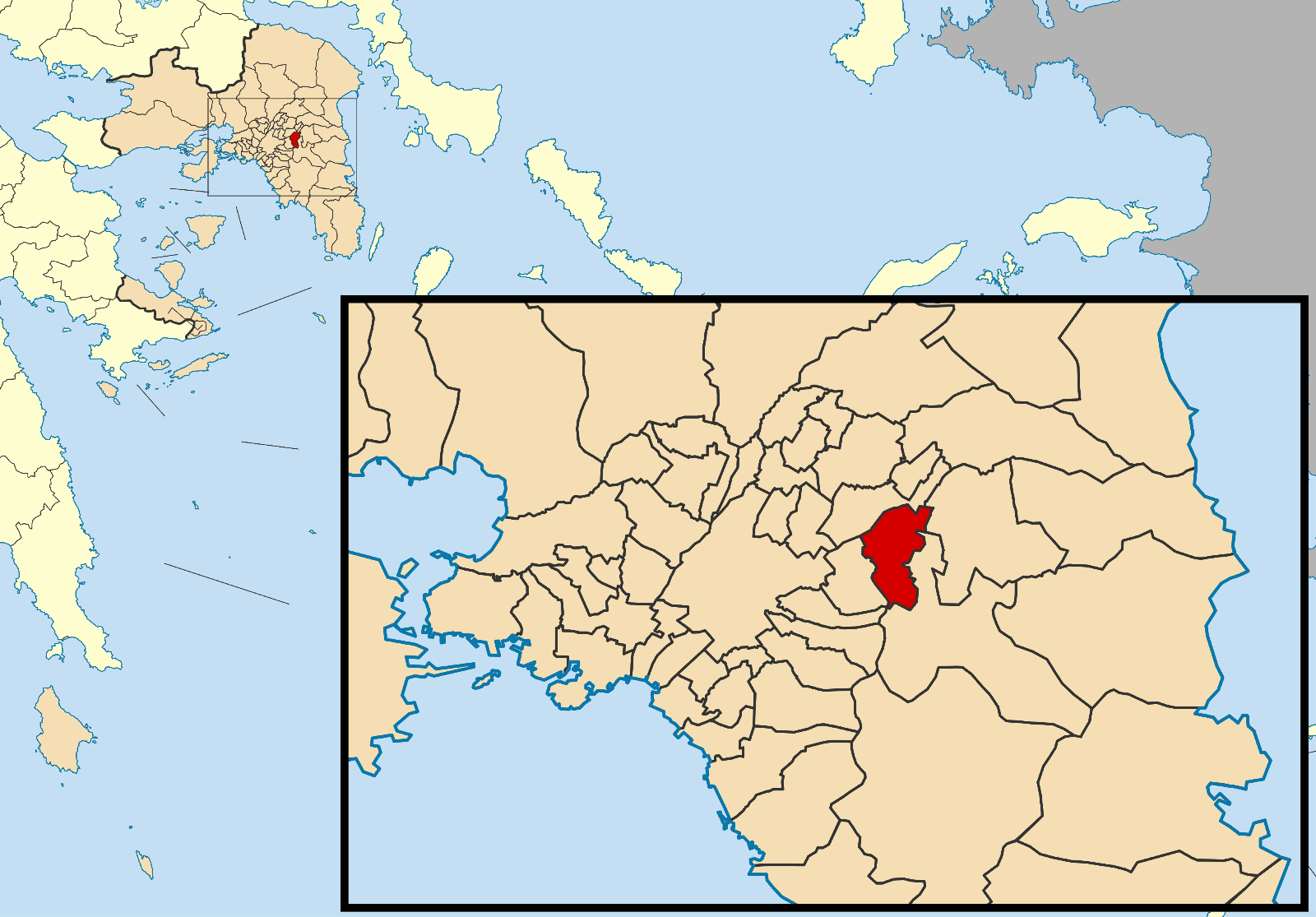

- Location within Greece
- Coordinates: 38°0.7′N 23°49.2′E
- Country: Greece
- Administrative region: Attica
- Regional unit: North Athens

Government
  - Mayor: Ioannis Mylonakis (since 2023)

Area
  - Municipality: 7.935 km^{2} (3.064 sq mi)
- Elevation: 206 m (676 ft)

Population (2021)
  - Municipality: 62,147
  - Density: 7,832/km^{2} (20,280/sq mi)
- Time zone: UTC+2 (EET)
  - Summer (DST): UTC+3 (EEST)
- Postal code: 153 xx, 154 xx
- Area code: 210
- Vehicle registration: I
- Website: www.agiaparaskevi.gr

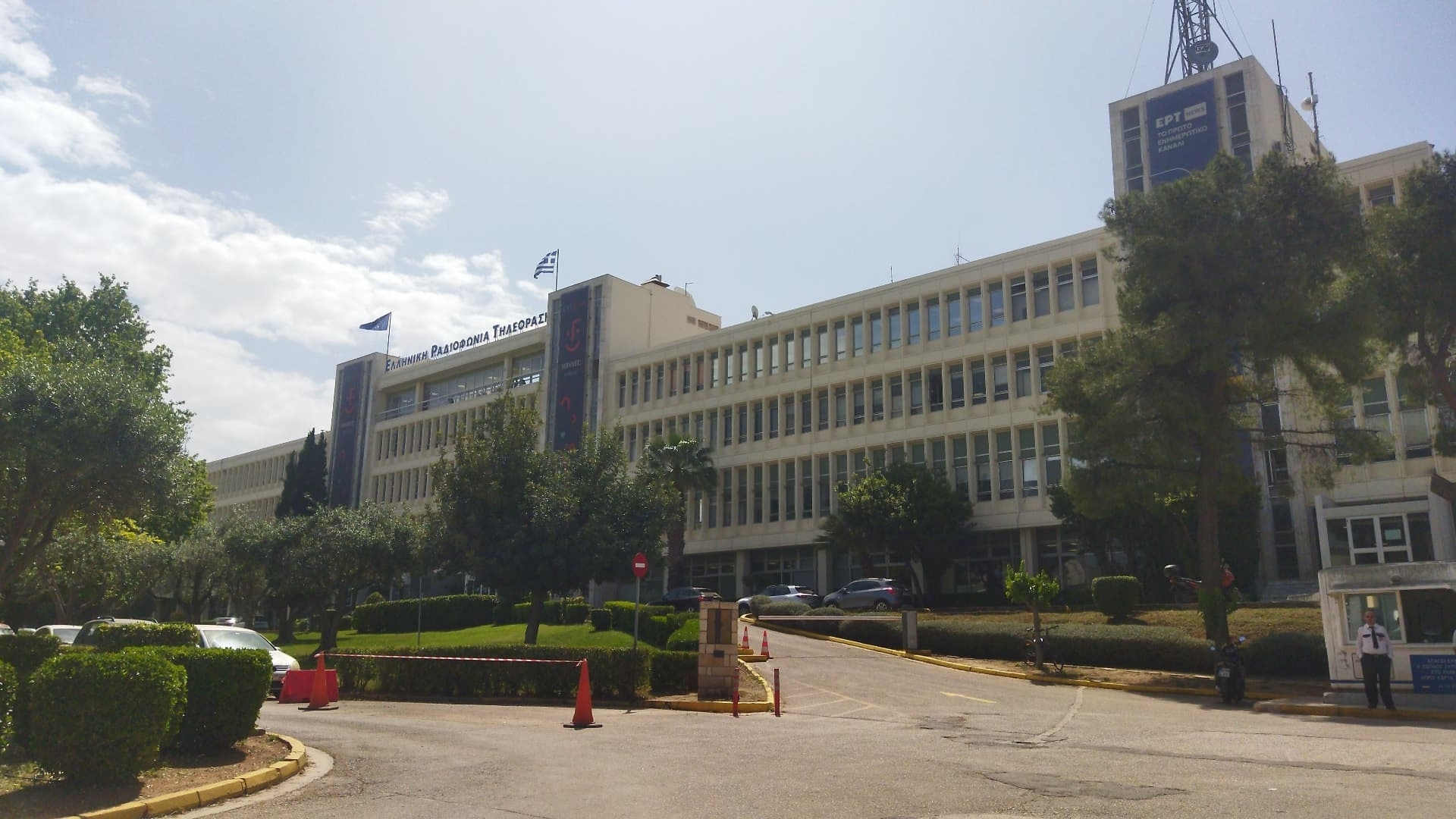
The Broadcasting House, headquartered at Messogeion Avenue 432

Agia Paraskevi (Greek: Αγία Παρασκευή, Agía Paraskeví) is a suburb and a municipality in the northeastern part of the Athens agglomeration, Greece. It is part of the North Athens regional unit. Agia Paraskevi was named after the main church of the town, which is dedicated to Saint Paraskevi of Rome.

== Geography ==
Agia Paraskevi is situated near the northern edge of the forested Hymettus mountain range, 9 km (6 mi) northeast of Athens city center. The municipality has an area of 7.935 km^{2}. The built-up area of Agia Paraskevi is continuous with those of the neighboring Cholargos, Chalandri and Gerakas. Besides the central area around the Agia Paraskevi Square, Agia Paraskevi consists of 7 districts: Kontopefko, Nea Zoi, Tsakos, Stavros, Aigiannis, Pefkakia and Paradeisos. The National Center of Scientific Research Demokritos, which hosts the sole nuclear reactor in Greece, is situated in Agia Paraskevi. It is also home of the Greek Ministry of Agriculture.

The main thoroughfare is Mesogeion Avenue, which connects Agia Paraskevi with central Athens. The eastern beltway A62 motorway passes through the southeastern part of the municipality. The municipality is served by several metro stations and a suburban railway station, located in adjacent municipalities.

== History ==
Agia Paraskevi was part of the community of Chalandri until 1931, when it became a separate community. It became a municipality in 1963. Formerly a farmers' village, it experienced much suburban development since the 1950s.

In 1993, there was considerable opposition from inhabitants of the suburb to the construction of the A62 Hymettus Ring Road. The ring road was to form a major highway on the mountainside linked directly to the A6, and the construction of both motorways were to commence immediately. The realization that this plan would demand the felling of a considerable number of trees, as well as spurring an increase in noise pollution, predictably aroused the opposition of the local population, who requested a different solution: a covered road. However, the government would not reverse the decision and, in fact, sent bulldozers to the mountainside. This led to a riot in April, 1993. Thousands of people traveled up the mountainside and faced the bulldozers, forcing the drivers to leave. At length police arrived and managed to force the demonstrators off the site; eventually the construction of the two highways began, and was completed in 2001. The road was covered only at a small section, that running over the Deree College.

== Cultural clubs and activities ==
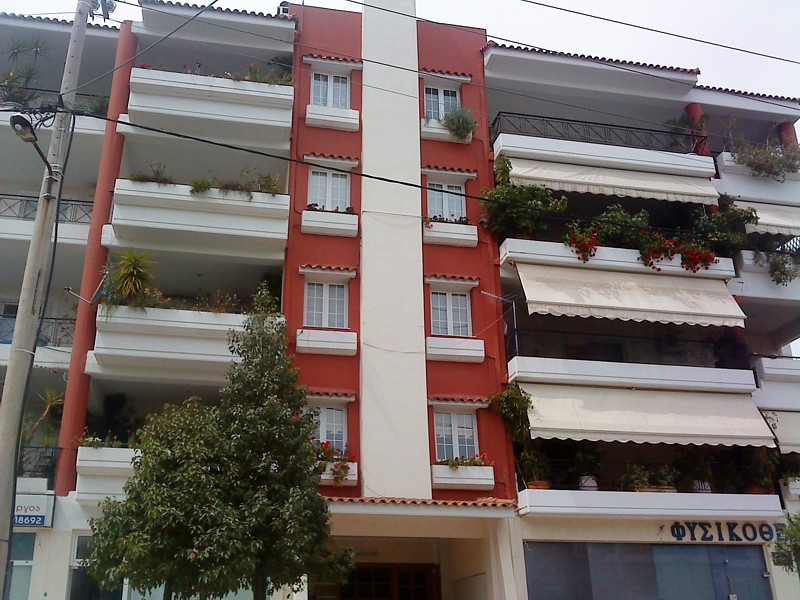
Block of apartments at the Kontopefko area.

The following cultural clubs, activities and workshops are available in Agia Paraskevi:

Municipal Conservatory, Art Workshops, Choir, Philharmonic Orchestra, Theater Group & Drama Club, Dance Classes, Film Club and Open Air Cinema, Open University courses and various other cultural clubs that organize events throughout the year.

== Sports ==
The football team of the city is Agia Paraskevi F.C., known as "Santa", attracting devoted fans. During the Olympic games in 2004, a part of the historical Marathon passed through Agia Paraskevi over Mesogeion avenue. Agia Paraskevi hosts also two basketball clubs with earlier presence in the higher national divisions, Basketball Agia Paraskevi and GS Agia Paraskevi.And P.A.O.D.A.P. city organization with individual sports like tennis, fighting sports and more.

Sport clubs based in Agia Paraskevi
Club	Founded	Sports	Achievements
Agia Paraskevi F.C.	1931	Football	Presence in Gamma Ethniki
GS Agia Paraskevi	1976	Basketball	Earlier presence in A1 Ethniki women
Basketball Agia Paraskevi	1986	Basketball	Earlier presence in A2 Ethniki men
A.E. Agias Paraskevis	1995	Volleyball	A'2 National Women’s Volley League
Olympiada Agias Paraskevis	1996	Futsal	Panhellenic title in futsal
A.O.Pegasus Agias Paraskevis	2007	Kids Sports Academy	First Youth Futsal Adidas Cup

== Education ==
Agia Paraskevi hosts a diverse range of educational institutions, encompassing public schools at all levels and significant private and international colleges.

The municipality provides a comprehensive public education system, including 13 kindergarten schools, 11 elementary schools, 6 junior high schools (including one for the hearing impaired), and 5 high schools (including one for the hearing impaired). Additionally, there are 3 vocational-technical high schools, one of which is specifically for the hearing impaired. The provision of free public education at all levels is a constitutional principle in Greece.

Agia Paraskevi is also a hub for international education, hosting two highly recognized institutions. The American College of Greece (ACG), the oldest and largest U.S.-accredited educational institution in Europe, has its main Aghia Paraskevi Campus, which houses both Deree and Pierce. Furthermore, the Lycée Franco-Hellénique Eugène Delacroix (LFH), a French international school, is situated in the town. It operates under the French Agency for French Education Abroad and offers dual French and Greek educational tracks from preschool through high school.

== Twin towns ==
Agia Paraskevi is twinned with:

- Saint-Brieuc, France (May 1992)
- Grocka, Serbia (May 1994)
- Geroskipou, Cyprus (May 1998)

== Historical population ==
Year	Population
1981	32,904
1991	47,463
2001	56,836
2011	59,704
2021	62,147
