= Nikos Liakopoulos =

Greek basketball player

Nikos Liakopoulos Νίκος Λιακόπουλος
KAO Korinthou
- Position: Shooting guard / point guard
- League: Greek B Basket League

Personal information
- Born: March 16, 1983 (age 43) Agios Dimitrios, Athens, Greece
- Listed height: 6 ft 3 in (1.91 m)
- Listed weight: 210 lb (95 kg)

Career information
- NBA draft: 2005: undrafted
- Playing career: 2001–present

Career history
- 2001–2002: Sporting
- 2002–2003: Maroussi
- 2003–2004: Sporting
- 2004–2005: Irakleio
- 2005–2006: Ilysiakos
- 2006–2007: Dafni
- 2007–2008: Pagrati
- 2008–2009: Iraklis Thessaloniki
- 2009–2011: Ermis Peramatos
- 2011–2012: Kolossos Rodou
- 2012–2013: Panelefsiniakos
- 2013–2015: Nea Kifissia
- 2015–2017: Faros Keratsiniou
- 2017–2018: Doxa Lefkadas
- 2018–2019: Ionikos Nikaias
- 2019–2020: Diagoras Dryopideon
- 2020–2021: KAOK
- 2021: Ionikos Nikaias
- 2021–present: KAO Korinthou team 20 = Amyntas

Career highlights
- Greek 2nd Division champion (2019); 2× Greek Second Division Top Scorer (2010, 2020); Greek Third Division Top Scorer (2011)

Nikolaos "Nikos" Liakopoulos (Greek: Νικόλαος "Νίκος" Λιακόπουλος; born March 16, 1983, in Greece) is a Greek professional basketball player for KAO Korinthou of the Greek 3rd division. He is a 1.91 m (6 ft 3 in) tall point guard-shooting guard.

== Professional career ==
Liakopoulos has played at the pro club level with some of the following clubs: Sporting, Maroussi, Irakleio, Ilysiakos, Dafni, Pagrati, Iraklis, Peramatos Ermis, Kolossos, Elefsina, AENK. In 2015, Liakopoulos signed a 2-year contract with the Greek 2nd Division club Faros Keratsiniou. In 2017, he joined the Greek 2nd Division club Doxa Lefkadas.

In 2018, he moved to the Greek A2 League club Ionikos Nikaias, where he helped the team gain a league promotion to the highest Greek level. On July 9, 2021, he officially returned to Ionikos.

== Awards and accomplishments ==
- 2× Greek Second Division: Top Scorer (2010, 2020)
- Greek Third Division: Top Scorer (2011)
