= Kymis B.C. =

Kymi Seajets
- Founded: 2010
- Dissolved: 2019
- History: Kymis B.C. (2010 – 2019)
- Arena: Nikos Marinos Indoor Hall; Tasos Kampouris Indoor Hall
- Capacity: Nikos Marinos Hall; 1,100; Tasos Kampouris Hall; 1,620
- Location: Kymi, Euboea, Greece
- Team colors
- President: Alexandros Theodorou
- Head coach: vacant
- Team captain: Stavros Toutziarakis
- 2018–19 position: 11th
- Championships: 1 Greek A2 Championship (2016); 1 Greek B League South Division (Beta Ethniki) (2015); 1 Greek C League Fourth Group (Gamma Ethniki) (2014)
- Website: gskimis.gr
Home	Away

Kymi B.C. or Kymis B.C. is a Greek professional basketball club that is located in Kymi, on the island of Euboea, Greece. The club is also known as G.S. Kymis, with the club's full name being Gymnastikos Syllogos Kymis (Greek: Γυμναστικός Σύλλογος Κύμης). The club has competed in the Greek Basket League. The team's emblem is the Greek Goddess Athena.

Kymi was founded in 2010, with the creation of the men's basketball section. The club began its course very strongly, and managed to achieve several league promotions, from their local regional championships, all the way up to the top-tier level Greek national league.

In 2019, the club merged with Lavrio, and granted its licence for the Greek Basket League to them. Kymis then temporarily suspended its basketball operations, and dropped out of all competitions for the time being.

== Logos ==
(2010–2016)

(2016–2019)

== History ==
The Greek athletic club Gymnastikos Syllogos Kymis 1893, or G.S. Kymis 1893, was founded in the year 1893. G.S. Kymis was one of the first Greek sports clubs, and the club's gym was used to train Greek athletes that competed at the first modern Olympics in 1896. G.S. Kymis was also one of the original 28 founding clubs of the Hellenic Amateur Athletic Association (SEGAS) in 1897. In 1907, G.S. Kymis ceased operations as an active sporting club.

In 2010, an ownership group re-founded the club G.S. Kymis, as a legal continuation and rights successor of the original G.S. Kymis 1893 club. The club was re-founded using the same emblem that the original club used, the Greek Goddess Athena.

=== Local regional categories ===
At the beginning of the 2010–11 season, the club joined the 3rd class of the local regional ESKASE division, and managed to directly achieve a promotion to the ESKASE local regional second division. In the following season, Kymis maintained its previous season's impetus, and in the next summer, it gained another promotion to the 1st class of the local regional ESKASE league.

In May 2012, the club named Vassilis Bratsiakos, as the men's team's head basketball coach. The rise of the club's status in the 1st ESKASE local regional league continued the following year, when Kymi won their local regional championship against A.C. Kymi, and gained promotion to the Greek lower level national leagues.

=== Lower level national leagues ===
With Vassilis Bratsiakos as the head coach, Kymi became the champion of the 4th-tier level Greek C Basket League, finishing with 19 wins and just one defeat.

The next season, the club competed in the 3rd-tier level Greek B Basket League, and in particular, in the South Group. Continuing its upward trend, the club once again finished in the top of the final standings, having collected 24 wins and 2 losses, against 13 rivals, while maintaining an unbeaten record at home games.

=== A2 Basket League ===
In the 2015–16 season, the club competed in the 2nd-tier level Greek A2 Basket League, for the first time in its history. During the 2015 summer transfer window, Kymi managed to make some very good transfers (for that level of competition), including Stavros Toutziarakis, Ioannis Psathas, Alexandros Sigkounas, and Vaidas Kariniauskas, who was signed from the EuroLeague team Žalgiris Kaunas. This made Kymi one of the favorites to win the A2 league.

On May 21, 2016, Kymi beat their main rivals for the league's promotion, Faros Keratsiniou, by a score of 67–56, and secured their place in the top-tier level Greek Basket League for the first time in the club's history. Kymi also became the first club that had managed to get six straight promotions to higher-tier leagues.

=== Greek Basket League ===
Kymis played in the top-tier level Greek Basket League for the first time, in the 2016–17 season. Following the 2018–19 season, the club merged with Lavrio, and granted its licence for the 2019–20 season to them. Kymis then temporarily suspended its basketball operations, and dropped out of all competitions for the time being, due to the delays on the construction of the new stadium in Kymi.

== Arenas ==
The club normally plays its home games at the Nikos Marinos Indoor Hall, a small arena that originally had a capacity of about 500. After the promotion of the club to the top-tier level Greek Basket League, Kymi began to renovate and expand the arena, in order for it to be eligible for Greek Basket League matches. The capacity of the arena will be increased from 500 to 1,100 seats.

While the Nikos Marinos Indoor Hall was being renovated, Kymi decided to play their home Greek Basket League games at the 1,620 capacity Tasos Kampouris Kanithou Indoor Hall, which is also located on the island of Euboea, in Chalcis.

== Season by season ==
Season	Tier	Division	Pos.	Greek Cup	European competitions
2013–14	4	C Basket League	1st		
2014–15	3	B Basket League	1st		
2015–16	2	A2 Basket League	1st		
2016–17	1	Greek Basket League	12th		
2017–18	1	Greek Basket League	7th		
2018–19	1	Greek Basket League	11th		

== Championships and honors ==
- Total Titles: 3
- Divisional: 3
  - Greek A2 League (A2 Ethniki):
    - 2016
  - Greek B League South Division (Beta Ethniki):
    - 2015
  - Greek C League Fourth Group (Gamma Ethniki):
    - 2014

== Notable players ==
Note: Flags indicate national team eligibility at FIBA-sanctioned events. Players may hold other non-FIBA nationalities not displayed.

Criteria

To appear in this section a player must have either:

- Set a club record or won an individual award while at the club
- Played at least one official international match for their national team at any time
- Played at least one official NBA match at any time.

- Nikos Barlos
- / Etinosa Erevbenagie
- Markos Kolokas
- Thanos Konstantakopoulos
- Dimitrios Lolas
- / Igor Milošević
- Ioannis Psathas
- Angelos Siamandouras
- Alexandros Sigkounas
- Stavros Toutziarakis
- Vaidas Kariniauskas
- Martin Pahlmblad
- Slaven Čupković
- Chavdar Kostov
- Jason Cadee
- Teddy Okereafor
- Muhammad El-Amin
- Chris Horton
- Cameron Jones
- Michale Kyser
- JeQuan Lewis
- Thad McFadden
- Gary McGhee
- Jordan Morgan
- Daniel Orton
- Lenzelle Smith Jr.
- Scott Suggs
- DeVaughn Washington
- Matt Williams

== Head coaches ==
- Ioannis Kastritis
