= Koropi =

Town in East Attica, Greece

Koropi Κορωπί
- Community
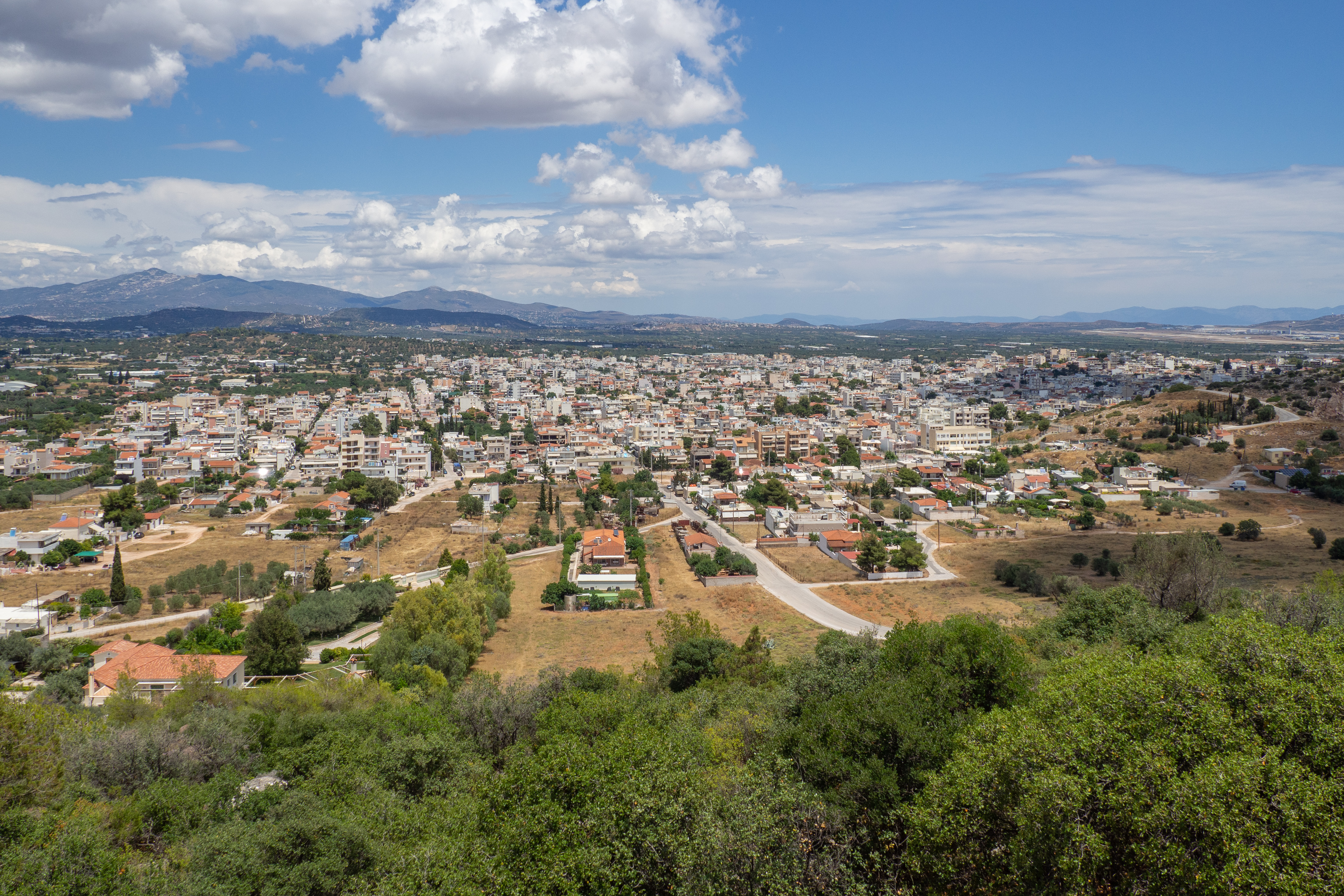

- Location within Greece
- Coordinates: 37°54.0′N 23°52.4′E
- Country: Greece
- Administrative region: Attica
- Regional unit: East Attica
- Municipality: Kropia
- Elevation: 106 m (348 ft)

Population (2021)
  - Community: 20,152
- Time zone: UTC+2 (EET)
  - Summer (DST): UTC+3 (EEST)
- Postal code: 194 41
- Area code: 210
- Vehicle registration: Z
- Website: www.koropi.gr

Koropi (Greek: Κορωπί, Greek pronunciation: [ko.ro.ˈpi]) is a suburban town in East Attica, Greece. It is the seat of the municipality Kropia. It has been home to the new training facilities of Panathinaikos football club since the summer of 2013.

== Geography ==
Koropi is situated east of the Hymettus mountain, and 16 km southeast of central Athens. It is 8 km southwest of the Eleftherios Venizelos International Airport. The Koropi station is served by Line 3 of the Athens Metro, and the Athens Suburban Railway. The A6 toll motorway, part of the Attiki Odos, connects Koropi with Athens and Elefsina.

Koropi is the largest settlement in the municipality Kropia. Other settlements within Kropia are Karellas to the north, Kitsi to the southwest, and Agia Marina and Agios Dimitrios further south, on the Saronic Gulf coast. It is part of Athens metropolitan area.

== Historical monuments ==
The church (old cathedral) of the Assumption. A wall painting monument of Georgios Markou the Argus, the great and prolific post-Byzantine ecclesiastic iconographer of the 18th century ("....La Dormizione della Madona, (1732), che si trova a Coropi dell 'Attica...." Evangelos Andreou http://ketlib.lib.unipi.gr/xmlui/handle/ket/849)

== Population history ==
Historical population
Year	Pop.	±%
1981	12,873	—
1991	12,945	+0.6%
2001	16,226	+25.3%
2011	19,164	+18.1%
2021	20,152	+5.2%

== Economy ==
Olympic Air, has its head office in Koropi. When Athens Airways existed, its head office was in Koropi.

== Sports ==
Koropi hosts the sport teams Koropi F.C. (A.O. Koropi), one of the oldest Greek club, founded in 1903 and Koropi B.C. (Gymnastikos Syllogos Koropi) founded in 1980.

Sport clubs based in Koropi
Club	Founded	Sports	Achievements
A.O. Koropi F.C.	1903	Football	Earlier presence in Beta Ethniki
G.S. Koropi B.C.	1980	Basketball	Presence in Beta Ethniki Basketball

== Notable people ==
- Georgios Papasideris, athlete, competed at the 1896 Summer Olympics

== See also ==
- List of municipalities of Attica
