= Alexandros Sigkounas =

Greek basketball player

Giorgos Sigkounas
Free agent
- Position: Power forward / small forward

Personal information
- Born: July 7, 1988 (age 38) Marousi, Attiki, Greece
- Listed height: 6 ft 7.5 in (2.02 m)
- Listed weight: 225 lb (102 kg)

Career information
- NBA draft: 2010: undrafted
- Playing career: 2006–present

Career history
- 2006–2008: Panionios
- 2008–2009: Olympia Larissa
- 2009–2010: Kavala
- 2010: Iraklis Thessaloniki
- 2010–2011: Panelefsiniakos
- 2011–2012: Pagrati
- 2012: KAOD
- 2012–2013: Arkadikos
- 2013–2014: Ermis Lagkada
- 2014–2015: LF Basket
- 2015: Apollon Patras
- 2015–2017: Kymis
- 2017–2018: Peristeri
- 2018–2019: Rethymno Cretan Kings
- 2019–2020: Koroivos Amaliadas
- 2020: Vrijednosnice Osijek

Career highlights
- 2x Greek 2nd Division champion (2016, 2018)

Giorgos Sigkounas (alternate spelling: Sisgkounas) (Greek: Αλέξανδρος Σιγκούνας; born July 7, 1988) is a Greek professional basketball player who last played for Vrijednosnice Osijek of the Croatian League. He is a 2.02 m (6 ft 7½ in) tall small forward-power forward.

== Professional career ==
Born in Attiki, Greece, Sigkounas began his professional basketball career with the Greek League club Panionios in 2006.

In 2008, he moved to Olympia Larissa, and then to Kavala in 2009. After spending only one season with Kavala, he decided to leave the team in 2010, when he signed a one-year contract with Iraklis Thessaloniki.

Then, he moved to Pagrati. He joined the Greek club KAOD in 2012. In November 2012, he joined Arkadikos. For the 2013–14 season, he joined Ermis Lagkada.

He then moved to the Swedish League club LF Basket. On March 25, 2015, he signed with the Greek club Apollon Patras.

On July 30, 2015, Sigkounas moved to Kymis signing a 1+1 year deal. With Kymis, he won the Greek 2nd Division championship the same year.

== National team career ==
Sigkounas played with the junior national teams of Greece. With Greece's junior national teams, he played at the following tournaments: both the 2003 and 2004 FIBA Europe Under-16 Championships, both the 2005 and 2006 FIBA Europe Under-18 Championships, and both the 2007 and 2008 FIBA Europe Under-20 Championships.
