= Ioannis Psathas =

Greek basketball player

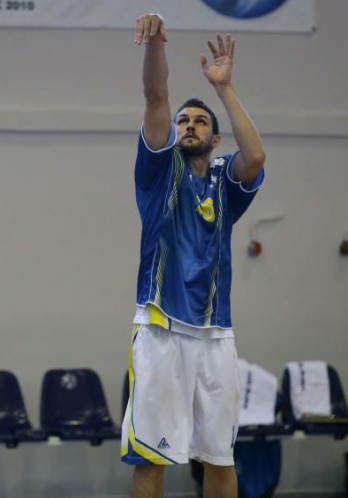
- Psathas with Kymis in 2016.

Psychiko
- Position: Small forward / power forward
- League: Greek 2nd Division

Personal information
- Born: April 11, 1983 (age 43) Chalkidiki, Greece
- Listed height: 6 ft 6 in (1.98 m)
- Listed weight: 216 lb (98 kg)

Career information
- NBA draft: 2005: undrafted
- Playing career: 2004–present

Career history
- 2003–2004: Achileas Triandias
- 2004–2007: ICBS
- 2007–2008: Chalkida
- 2008–2009: Panerythraikos
- 2009–2010: Rethymno
- 2010–2011: Apollon Patras
- 2011–2012: Psychiko
- 2012–2015: Nea Kifissia
- 2015–2016: Kymis
- 2016–2017: Doxa Lefkadas
- 2017–present: Psychiko

Career highlights
- 2× Greek 2nd Division champion (2013, 2016)

Ioannis Psathas (alternate spellings: Giannis, Yiannis) (Greek: Γιάννης Ψαθάς; born April 15, 1983) is a Greek professional basketball player. He is 1.98 m (6 ft 6 in) in height, and he can play at both the small forward and power forward positions.

== Professional career ==
Psathas started his amateur career with Aetos Polygyrou and AO Polygyrou, where he stayed from 1997 to 2002. Then, he played for Aetos Toumpas, and one year later, he signed with Achileas Triandias.

In 2004, he joined ICBS of the Greek A2 League, where he stayed for three seasons.

From 2007 through 2012, Psathas played with multiple teams, such as Chalkida, Rethymno, Apollon Patras, and Psychiko.

In 2012, he moved to Nea Kifissia. With Kifissia, he gained the league promotion to the top-tier level Greek Basket League, in 2013. He stayed with the club until 2015.

On June 10, 2015, Psathas joined Kymis, after signing a two-year contract with them. During his first season with Kymis (2015–16), he won the Greek 2nd Division. In 2016, he joined Doxa Lefkadas.
