= ICBS B.C. =

Greek basketball team (1993–2009)

- Founded: 1993
- History: 1993–2009; ICBS B.C.
- Arena: ICBS Forum
- Capacity: 1,600
- Location: Thessaloniki, Greece
- Team colors: Red and Blue
- President: Konstantinos Tsotsoumanos
- Head coach: Nikolaos Tsotsoumanos
- Website: icbs.gr
Home	Away

ICBS B.C. was a Greek professional basketball team that was founded in 1993. The team was based in the Oraiokastro district of Thessaloniki, Greece. During its existence, the club competed in the Greek 2nd Division.

== History ==
The club was promoted up through 6 divisions in 6 consecutive years, that included them winning the Greek EKASTH 5th Division in 1998, and the Greek 4th Division in 1999. The club eventually went on to play in the Greek 2nd Division. In 2009, the club merged with Perama/Ermis, and formed the new club under the name of Peramatos Ermis

== Championships ==
- Greek Under-19 Champion: (1996)
- Greek EKASTH Division Champion: (1998)
- Greek C League Champion: (1999)

== Notable players ==
Note: Flags indicate national team eligibility at FIBA-sanctioned events. Players may hold other non-FIBA nationalities not displayed.

Criteria

To appear in this section a player must have either:

- Set a club record or won an individual award while at the club
- Played at least one official international match for their national team at any time
- Played at least one official NBA match at any time.

- (Greece) Ioannis Demertzis
- (Greece) Sakis Karidas
- (Greece) Christos Petrodimopoulos
- (Greece) Ioannis Psathas
- (Greece) Ioannis Sioutis
- (Greece) Thodoris Zaras

== Head coaches ==
- (Greece) Dinos Kalampakos

== Junior teams ==
In 1996, the club's under-18 age team won the Greek Under-18 national championship.
