= Lazaros Agadakos =

Greek basketball player (born 1980)

Personal information
- Born: January 1, 1980 (age 46) Maroussi, Athens, Greece
- Listed height: 6 ft 10 in (2.08 m)
- Listed weight: 250 lb (113 kg)

Career information
- Playing career: 1998–2017
- Position: Power forward / center

Career history
- 1998–1999: Palaio Faliro
- 1999–2003: Panionios
- 2003–2004: Maroussi
- 2004–2006: Olympiacos
- 2006–2007: PAOK
- 2007–2009: Aris
- 2010: Peristeri
- 2010–2013: Ikaros
- 2014–2016: Koropi
- 2016–2018: EFAO Zografou
- 2019–present: Aris Syrou
Medals
Men's basketball
Representing Greece
FIBA Europe Under-16 Championship
Bronze medal – third place	1995 Portugal	Under-16
FIBA Europe Under-18 Championship
Bronze medal – third place	1998 Bulgaria	Under-18

Lazaros "Lazo" Agadakos (Greek: Λάζαρος Αγαδάκος; born January 1, 1980) is a Greek professional basketball player. At a height of 2.08 m (6 ft 10 in) tall, he played at the power forward and center positions.

== Professional career ==
After playing in the Greek minors with Ilioupolis, in the 1997–98 season, Agadakos started his professional career playing with Palaio Faliro, in the Greek 2nd Division, in the 1998–99 season. He then spent 4 seasons with the Greek 1st Division club Panionios, and then spent a year with Maroussi. In 2004, he joined the Greek club Olympiacos, and he played there for two years in the EuroLeague. He then moved to PAOK for one year, and he later joined Aris.

== National team career ==
Agadakos won bronze medals at the 1995 FIBA Europe Under-16 Championship, and the 1998 FIBA Europe Under-18 Championship.
