= Thanos Konstantakopoulos =

Greek basketball player

Thanos Konstantakopoulos Θάνος Κωνσταντακόπουλος
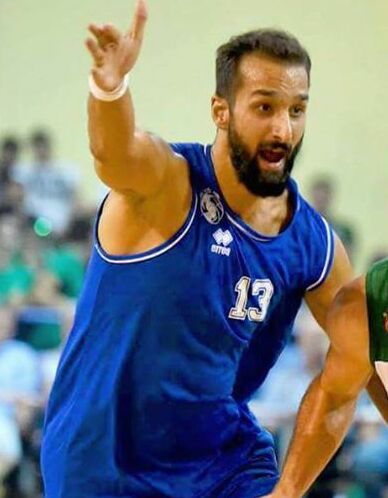
- Konstantakopoulos against Panathinaikos

Zhejiang Golden Bulls
- Title: Assistant coach
- League: CBA

Personal information
- Born: February 24, 1988 (age 38) Athens, Greece
- Listed height: 6 ft 6 in (1.98 m)

Career information
- Playing career: 2006–2020
- Position: Point guard / shooting guard
- Coaching career: 2020–present

Career history

Playing
- 2006–2007: Peristeri
- 2007–2009: Kronos
- 2009–2012: Panelefsiniakos
- 2012–2013: Marousi
- 2013–2014: Livadeia
- 2014–2017: Kymis
- 2017–2018: Peristeri
- 2018–2020: Amyntas
- 2020–2021: Papagou
- 2020–2021: Maroussi
- 2021–2022: Ermis Argiroupolis
- 2024: Skorpioi

Coaching
- 2020–2022: Greece (Cadets, Juniors)
- 2022–2023: Triton Sepolion (assistant)
- 2023–2024: Proteas Voulas (assistant)
- 2024–2025: Peristeri (assistant)
- 2025–2026: Promitheas Patras (assistant)
- 2026–present: Zhejiang Golden Bulls (assistant)

Career highlights
- 3× Greek 2nd Division champion (2012, 2016, 2018)

Thanos Konstantakopoulos (alternate spelling: Thanasis) (Greek: Θάνος Κωνσταντακόπουλος; born February 24, 1988, in Athens, Greece) is a Greek former professional basketball player and current basketball coach.

== Professional career ==
Konstantakopoulos started his professional career with Peristeri in 2006. He also played with Kronos, Panelefsiniakos, Marousi, Livadeia, Kymis, Peristeri, Papagou and Amyntas.

== Coaching career ==
Konstantakopoulos served as an assistant coach at Triton Sepolion and Proteas Voulas of the Greek Elite League.

On 2024, he joined Peristeri and the following season he moved to Promitheas Patras as an assistant coach, alongside Georgios Limniatis.
