= Koropi B.C. =

- League: Greek B' League
- Founded: 1980
- Arena: Georgios Papasideris Indoor Hall
- Capacity: 500
- Location: Koropi, Attica, Greece
- Team colors: Green, Yellow
- Head coach: Savvas Katsounis
- 2015–16 position: Greek B' League: 7th
- Championships: (1) A' ESKA Championship (1st Division of Attica)
- Website: koropibc.gr
Home	Away

Koropi B.C. is a Greek semi-professional basketball club that is based in Koropi, Attica, Greece, is the basketball department of parent multi-sport club "G.S. Koropi" (Greek: Γυμναστικός Σύλλογος Κορωπίου), competes in the Greek B' League the 3rd - tier of Greek Basketball. The team plays at the Georgios Papasideris Indoor Hall, club colours are green and yellow.

== History ==
In season 2004-2005 the men's basketball team won the championship of 1st Division of Attica (A' ESKA) and consequently the right to participate in the Greek C' Basket League

The next period of 2005- 2006 the club was ranked 9th place in the final standings of the 1st Group North at C' National Division thus return to local leagues.

At the end of season 2011-2012 Panellinios BC failed to participate in the A2 National and demoted to the local championship, leading domino upheaval. The Greek Basketball Federation contacted the runner-up of the First Men Division of ESKA, the AO Zografou for the new place created in the C National, but the club refused due to the sudden restructure the team's roster. This opened the way for the Koropi BC accepted the promotion in order of the call for the rise.

In the 2012-2013 Championship at 2nd Group south of the C National, completing the season at the 3rd place of standings.

In season 2013-2014, the Koropi BC competed in the Greek C Basket League organised by the Greek Basketball Federation at the 1st South Group. Having accumulated 14 wins and 10 losses, they ranked 5th in the final standing ensuring the return to the same Championship by next autumn.

The next season 2014-2015 with a 22-4 record, they ranked 2nd in the 2nd Group South of the Greek C Basket League and won the promotion to the Greek B' League.

At the end of 2015-2016 season in the South Group of B' League at 7th place with a record 15-14.

== Notable players ==
Note: Flags indicate national team eligibility at FIBA-sanctioned events. Players may hold other non-FIBA nationalities not displayed.

Criteria

To appear in this section a player must have either:

- Set a club record or won an individual award while at the club
- Played at least one official international match for their national team at any time
- Played at least one official NBA match at any time.

- (Greece) Lazaros Agadakos
- (Greece) Tasos Dimas
- (Greece) Dimitrios Karadolamis
- (Greece) Vangelis Sklavos
