= Spyros Motsenigos =

Greek basketball player

Spyros Motsenigos Σπύρος Μοτσενίγος
Personal information
- Born: January 1, 1992 (age 34) Maroussi, Athens, Greece
- Listed height: 6 ft 4.5 in (1.94 m)
- Listed weight: 210 lb (95 kg)

Career information
- Playing career: 2011–present
- Position: Point guard / shooting guard

Career history
- 2011–2012: Rethymno
- 2012–2015: Panionios
- 2015–2016: Pagrati
- 2016–2018: Holargos
- 2018–2019: Diagoras Dryopideon
- 2019–2020: Eleftheroupoli Kavalas
- 2020–2021: Charilaos Trikoupis
- 2021–2024: Milon

Career highlights
- Greek A2 Elite League champion (2024)

Spyridon "Spyros" Motsenigos (alternate spelling: Spiridon, Spiros) (Greek: Σπυρίδων "Σπύρος" Μοτσενίγος; born January 1, 1992) is a Greek professional basketball player. He is 1.94 m (6 ft 4 1/2 in) tall, and he plays at the point guard and shooting guard positions.

== Professional career ==
Motsenigos began his professional career in the Greek Basket League with Rethymno, in 2011. He moved to Panionios in 2012. After that, he played with the Greek clubs Pagrati, Holargos, Diagoras Dryopideon, and Eleftheroupoli Kavalas.

He joined the Greek club Charilaos Trikoupis, in 2020.

In June 2021, Motsenigos joined the historic Nea Smyrni club Milon B.C.

== National team career ==
With the junior national teams of Greece, Mostenigos played at the following tournaments: the 2008 FIBA Europe Under-16 Championship, the 2009 FIBA Europe Under-18 Championship, the 2010 FIBA Europe Under-18 Championship, the 2011 FIBA Europe Under-20 Championship, and the 2012 FIBA Europe Under-20 Championship.
