= Moustapha Fall =

French basketball player (born 1992)

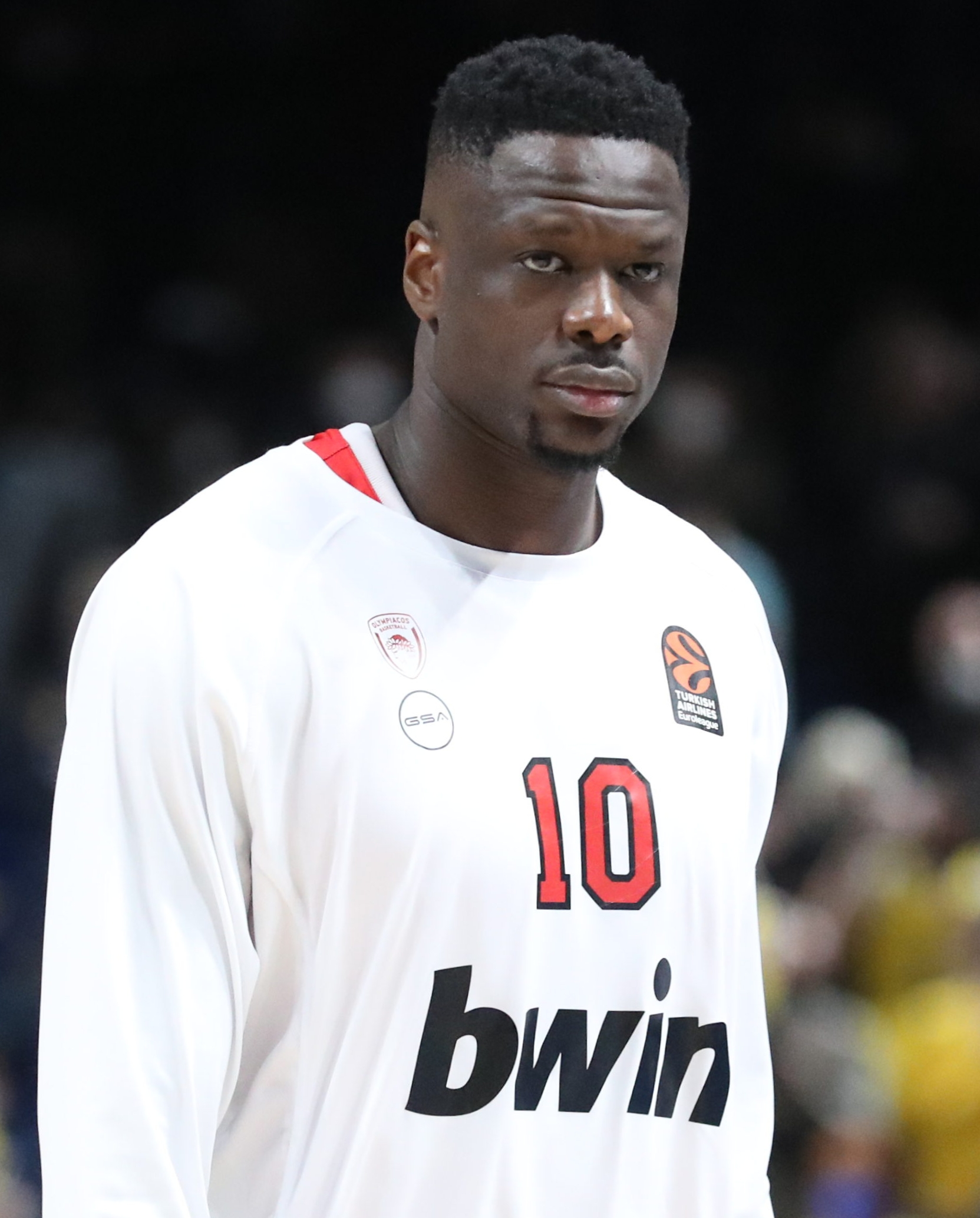
- Fall with Olympiacos in 2022

No. 93 – Panathinaikos
- Position: Center
- League: Greek Basketball League; EuroLeague

Personal information
- Born: 23 February 1992 (age 34) Paris, France
- Listed height: 2.21 m (7 ft 3 in)
- Listed weight: 124 kg (273 lb)

Career information
- NBA draft: 2014: undrafted
- Playing career: 2011–present

Career history
- 2011–2014: Poitiers 86
- 2014–2015: Monaco
- 2015–2016: Antibes Sharks
- 2016–2017: Élan Chalon
- 2017–2018: Sakarya BB
- 2018–2019: Lokomotiv Kuban
- 2019–2020: Türk Telekom
- 2020–2021: ASVEL
- 2021–2026: Olympiacos
- 2026–present: Panathinaikos

Career highlights
- EuroLeague champion (2026); All-FIBA Champions League Second Team (2020); All-FIBA Europe Cup Team (2017); FIBA Europe Cup Best Defender (2017); FIBA Europe Cup Finals MVP (2017); 4× Greek League champion (2022, 2023, 2025, 2026); 3× Greek Cup winner (2022–2024); 4× Greek Super Cup winner (2022–2025); All-Greek League Team (2023); Greek All-Star (2022); Greek Cup Finals MVP (2024); Greek Super Cup Finals MVP (2022); 2× LNB Pro A champion (2017, 2021); French Cup winner (2021); All-LNB Pro A Team (2021); LNB Pro A All-Star (2017); 2× LNB Pro A Best Defender (2017, 2021); 2× LNB Pro A blocks leader (2016, 2017); LNB Pro A rebounding leader (2017); French Cup Final MVP (2021); Turkish Super League blocks leader (2020); LNB Pro B champion (2015); All-LNB Pro B Team (2015); LNB Pro B Best Defender (2015); LNB Pro B blocks leader (2015); Knight of the National Order of Merit (2021)
Medals
Men's basketball
Representing France
Summer Olympics
Silver medal – second place	2020 Tokyo	Team
EuroBasket
Silver medal – second place	2022 Czech Republic–Georgia–Italy–Germany

Moustapha Fall (born 23 February 1992) is a French professional basketball player for Panathinaikos of the Greek Basket League (GBL) and the EuroLeague. He is also a member of the senior men's French national team. Standing at 2.20 m (7 ft 3 in), Fall plays at the center position.

== Professional career ==
Fall played in the French league from 2011 to 2017. In the 2015–16 season, he played for Olympique Antibes where he led the French league in blocked shots. He signed with Élan Chalon for the 2016–17 season. This season, Chalon won the Pro A, which was Fall's first national title. In addition, Fall played in the FIBA Europe Cup Final with Chalon, where his team lost to Nanterre 92. He was named Top Performer of the Final by the FIBA Europe Cup.

Prior to the start of the French season, Fall participated in the 2016 NBA Summer League in Las Vegas with the Los Angeles Lakers.

On 13 July 2017 Fall signed with Turkish club Sakarya BB.

On 26 July 2018 Fall signed with Lokomotiv Kuban of the Russian VTB United League.

On 21 July 2019 Fall signed a contract with the Türk Telekom of the Turkish Basketball Super League. In October 2020, Fall was named to the All-Basketball Champions League Second Team.

In June 2021, Fall signed with Olympiacos of Greece. On 28 February 2022, he extended his contract with the team until 2025. On 18 February 2024, Fall won his third consecutive Greek Cup with the team. He recorded 13 points, 7 rebounds and 2 assists in the final and was named the tournament's MVP. On 15 March 2024, Fall signed an early contract extension with Olympiacos through 2027. On 6 June 2025, he suffered a patellar tendon rupture during Game 3 of the GBL finals and is scheduled to be out of action for a period of 10 to 12 months.

On 24 June 2026, Fall signed with Panathinaikos.

== National team career ==
Fall has been a member of the senior French national team. He has played with France's national team at the 2021 FIBA Summer Olympics, the 2022 FIBA EuroBasket, and the 2023 FIBA World Cup. He won silver medals with France at the 2021 Summer Olympics and the 2022 EuroBasket.

== Personal life ==
Born in Paris, Fall is of Senegalese descent. He is not related to Tacko Fall or Youssoupha Fall.

== Player profile ==
He is a potential defender, finishing effectively in almost all passes under the basket, while often serving as a racket playmaker as he is a skilled passer.

== Awards and accomplishments ==
=== Club career ===
Monaco

- French Second League Champion: (2015)

Élan Chalon

- French League Champion: (2017)

ASVEL

- French League Champion: (2021)
- French Cup Winner: (2021)

Olympiacos

- EuroLeague Champion: (2026)
- 4× Greek League Champion: (2022, 2023, 2025, 2026)
- 3× Greek Cup Winner: (2022, 2023, 2024)
- 4× Greek Super Cup Winner: (2022, 2023, 2024, 2025)

=== Individual ===
- All-FIBA Champions League Second Team: (2020)
- FIBA Champions League Best Defender: (2020)
- FIBA Europe Cup Finals MVP: (2017)
- All-FIBA Europe Cup Team: (2017)
- FIBA Europe Cup Best Defender: (2017)
- FIBA Europe Cup blocks leader: (2017)
- All-Greek League Team: (2023)
- Greek Cup Finals MVP: (2024)
- Greek Cup Finals assists leader: (2023)
- Greek Super Cup Finals MVP: (2022)
- French Cup Final MVP: (2021)
- LNB Pro A Domestic Player of the Year: (2017)
- All-LNB Pro A Team: (2021)
- 2× LNB Pro A Best Defender: (2017, 2021)
- LNB Pro A rebounding leader: (2017)
- 2× LNB Pro A blocks leader: (2016, 2017)
- LNB Pro B Best Defender: (2015)
- LNB Pro B blocks leader: (2015)
- All-LNB Pro B Team (2015)
- Turkish Super League blocks leader: (2020)
- Knight of the National Order of Merit: (2021)

== Career statistics ==
Legend
GP	Games played	GS	Games started	MPG	Minutes per game
FG%	Field-goal percentage	3P%	3-point field-goal percentage	FT%	Free-throw percentage
RPG	Rebounds per game	APG	Assists per game	SPG	Steals per game
BPG	Blocks per game	PPG	Points per game	PIR	Performance index rating
**Bold**	Career high

=== EuroLeague ===
*	Led the league

Year	Team	GP	GS	MPG	FG%	3P%	FT%	RPG	APG	SPG	BPG	PPG	PIR
2020–21	ASVEL	31	28	21.5	.701	—	**.617**	**5.5**	1.8	.4	.9	**8.8**	**14.1**
2021–22	Olympiacos	37	37	22.5	.703	—	.613	5.1	1.1	.4	1.0	8.2	13.2
2022–23	Olympiacos	**40**	**39**	22.2	.722	—	.523	4.9	2.1	**.6**	.8	7.2	12.2
2023–24	Olympiacos	36	34	**22.6**	**.789***	—	.439	4.7	**2.4**	.2	**1.2**	7.2	13.4
2024–25	Olympiacos	35	32	17.3	.737	—	.412	2.9	1.9	.3	.8	5.8	8.7
Career		179	170	21.2	.732	—	.532	4.6	1.9	.4	1.0	7.4	12.2

=== EuroCup ===
Year	Team	GP	GS	MPG	FG%	3P%	FT%	RPG	APG	SPG	BPG	PPG	PIR
2018–19	Lokomotiv Kuban	10	5	12.2	.920	—	.526	2.9	.6	.2	.6	5.6	7.0
Career		10	5	12.2	.920	—	.526	2.9	.6	.2	.6	5.6	7.0

=== Basketball Champions League ===
Year	Team	GP	GS	MPG	FG%	3P%	FT%	RPG	APG	SPG	BPG	PPG
2019–20	Türk Telekom	22	21	20.0	.793	—	.370	7.7	3.3	.3	.9	11.6
Career		22	21	20.0	.793	—	.370	7.7	3.3	.3	.9	11.6

=== FIBA Europe Cup ===
Year	Team	GP	GS	MPG	FG%	3P%	FT%	RPG	APG	SPG	BPG	PPG
2016–17	Élan Chalon	19	18	30.4	.741	—	.521	8.2	2.7	.7	1.8	10.4
Career		19	18	30.4	.741	—	.521	8.2	2.7	.7	1.8	10.4

=== Domestic leagues ===
Year	Team	League	GP	MPG	FG%	3P%	FT%	RPG	APG	SPG	BPG	PPG
2011–12	(France) Poitiers	Pro A	3	7.0	.500	—	.000	2.0	.3	.3	—	2.0
2012–13	(France) Poitiers	Pro A	13	8.9	.650	—	.154	2.3	.1	.1	.7	2.1
2013–14	(France) Poitiers	Pro B	50	17.0	.689	—	.467	4.1	.8	.3	1.2	5.6
2014–15	(France) Monaco	Pro B	34	19.5	.669	—	.654	5.8	.8	.3	1.5	6.9
2015–16	(France) Antibes Sharks	Pro A	27	24.3	.726	—	.390	6.8	.9	.3	1.5	10.8
2016–17	(France) Élan Chalon	Pro A	45	30.3	.675	—	.503	8.3	2.6	.5	2.0	11.5
2017–18	(Turkey) Sakarya BB	TBSL	29	23.9	.692	.000	.479	6.1	2.5	.6	2.0	9.1
2018–19	(Russia) Lokomotiv Kuban	VTBUL	18	16.6	.734	.000	.565	4.6	1.4	.2	1.3	7.9
2019–20	(Turkey) Türk Telekom	TBSL	22	26.3	.803	—	.584	8.2	2.1	.5	1.4	12.0
2020–21	(France) ASVEL	LNB Élite	31	21.0	.782	—	.600	5.3	2.0	.3	1.0	9.8
2021–22	(Greece) Olympiacos	GBL	27	18.8	.714	—	.604	5.2	1.6	.3	.9	7.8
2022–23	(Greece) Olympiacos	GBL	26	19.3	.759	.000	.491	5.2	2.3	.5	1.1	7.4
2023–24	(Greece) Olympiacos	GBL	22	20.0	.793	—	.370	5.2	2.6	.3	.9	7.0
2024–25	(Greece) Olympiacos	GBL	21	18.5	.807	—	.516	4.4	2.6	.6	.8	7.1
