= Kendrick Johnson (basketball) =

American basketball player (born 1975)

Personal information
- Born: June 13, 1975 (age 51) United States
- Listed height: 6 ft 1 in (1.85 m)

Career information
- College: Point Loma
- NBA draft: 1997: undrafted
- Position: Guard

Career history
- 1999–2000: Sydney Kings
- 2000–2001: Milon
- 2001–2002: APOEL
- 2002–2003: ITU İstanbul
- 2003–2004: Irakleio
- 2004–2005: Rabotnički
- 2005: Union Baskets Schwelm
- 2005: Oostende
- 2005: Pallacanestro Biella
- 2005–2006: Kolossos Rodou
- 2006–2007: Kalev/Cramo
- 2007: Igokea
- 2007–2008: Atomerőmű SE

Kendrick Johnson (born June 3, 1975) is an American former professional basketball player who was a member of several Australian and European teams between 1999 and 2008; he played college basketball for the Point Loma Nazarene Sea Lions.

== Career ==
Johnson averaged 21.6 points, 5.2 rebounds and 4.5 assists per game while connecting on 47.8 percent from the field for the Sydney Kings in the 2000–01 season. He made his NBL debut for the Kings in late December 2000, his last game for the Kings came on March 11, 2001. During his Sydney stint, Johnson had a dunking which was later named "one of the best NBL jams of all-time".

In 2002–03, Johnson was the leading scorer of İstanbul Teknik Üniversitesi B.K. in the Turkish league, averaging 22.1 points a game. Playing for Union Baskets Schwelm in Germany's Basketball Bundesliga in 2005, Johnson scored 22.9 points per game through seven contests, including a 40-point-performance, setting the league's season high for most points in a single game.
