= Ioannis Demertzis (Macedonian fighter) =

Macedonian fighter

- Native name: Ιωάννης Δεμερτζής
- Born: c. late 1800s Serres, Salonika Vilayet, Ottoman Empire (now Greece)
- Allegiance: Kingdom of Greece
- Service / branch: HMC
- Battles / wars: Macedonian Struggle

Ioannis Demertzis (Greek: Ιωάννης Δεμερτζής) was a Greek chieftain of the Macedonian Struggle from Serres.

== Biography ==
Ioannis Demertzis was born during the late 19th century in Serres. He established an armed group in order to fight against Bulgarian Komitadjis as well as the Ottoman authorities during the Macedonian Struggle. As the commander of the group, he fought in the areas of Serres, Darnakochoria and Lower Tzoumayia. He often collaborated with the chieftain Sophia Chatzipantazi.
