= Athens Airways =

Greek airline

IATA	ICAO	Call sign
ZF	ATW	ATHENSAIR
- Founded: 2008
- Ceased operations: 2010
- Hubs: Athens International Airport
- Focus cities: Alexandroupolis International Airport, Mytilene International Airport, Thessaloniki International Airport, "Macedonia"
- Frequent-flyer program: Flights & Bonus
- Fleet size: 3 (upon closure)
- Destinations: 16
- Headquarters: Koropi, Athens, Greece
- Key people: Sakis Andrianopoulos (Owner - CEO)
- Website: http://www.athensairways.com/en

Athens Airways was a Greek regional airline, headquartered in Koropi, Athens. The airline used to connect Alexandroupoli, Athens and Thessaloniki with some Greek islands, as well offering chartered flights. The airline was founded in 2008 and launched scheduled flights on 31 January 2009.

In late May 2010 the Greek Civil Aviation Authority stripped Athens Airways of the right to serve a number of government-subsidised routes. Thιs was due to unexplained delays and cancellations by Athens Airways. Later that year, by early September and after concluding its summer schedule, the airline ceased operations without any notice.

== Services ==
Athens Airways was the first Greek airline to offer a 20 percent discount to all tariff categories for passengers aged 12 to 24, soldiers without boarding pass, and students up to the age of 28, as well as a 15 percent discount on return flights.

== Destinations ==
Athens Airways served the following domestic Greek destinations (as of 17 June 2010):

- Agios Kirykos - Ikaria Island National Airport
- Alexandroupoli – Alexandroupolis International Airport Focus City
- Argostoli - Kefalonia Island International Airport
- Athens – Athens International Airport Hub
- Chania – Chania International Airport
- Fira – Santorini (Thira) National Airport
- Heraklion - Heraklion International Airport, "Nikos Kazantzakis"
- Karpathos - Karpathos Island National Airport
- Kavala - Kavala Megas Alexandros International Airport
- Kythira - Kithira Island National Airport
- Mykonos - Mykonos Airport
- Myrina - Lemnos International Airport
- Mytilene – Mytilene International Airport Focus City
- Rhodes – Rhodes International Airport, "Diagoras"
- Skiathos – Skiathos Island National Airport
- Thessaloniki – Thessaloniki International Airport, "Macedonia" Focus City
- Zakynthos - Zakynthos International Airport, "Dionysios Solomos"

== Fleet ==
The Athens Airways fleet included the following aircraft (as of September 2010):

Athens Airways fleet
Aircraft	Total	Seats
Embraer ERJ 145EU	2	49
Dash 8-300	1	50
Total	4	
