= Ioannina BC =

Ioannina B.C.
- Nickname: IBC
- League: Greek B Basket League
- Founded: 2015
- Arena: Neo Kleisto Gymnastirio Ioannina
- Location: Ioannina, Greece
- Team colors: Blue, Yellow and White
- Main sponsor: Protergia (Mytilineos Holdings)
- President: Georgios Zaragkas
- Head coach: Giannis Papadopoulos
- Team captain: Christos Mpallas
- Championships: 1 A ESKAVDE, 1 C ESKAVDE
- Website: Club Website
Home	Away	Third

Ioannina Basketball Club (Greek: Ιωάννινα Σύλλογος Καλαθοσφαίρισης), also known simply as Ioannina B.C. or abbreviated as IBC, is a Hellenic Basketball Federation team based in Ioannina, Greece. The men's team is currently participating in Greek B Basket League, the women's team is playing in A ESKAVDE division and the Wheelchair Basketball team is participating in A2 National Division of the OSEKA league.

== Men's basketball team ==
=== History ===
Ioannina B.C. was founded in 2015 under its first name as Ioannina Sports Club, creating a men's basketball team and youth academies. In 2019 two new sections were established, Women's and Wheelchair basketball teams.

In 2015-16 season the team participated in C ESKAVDE(Northwestern Greek Basketball Clubs Association) division winning its promotion without a loss.

In 2016-17 season IBC merged with the neighbouring basketball club of Asteras Kalpakiou changing to its current name of Ioannina Basketball Club and participated in A ESKAVDE division. The team managed to enter the season's playoffs competing for its promotion to the Greek C Basket League but finished in the 3rd position.

In 2017–18 season IBC participated in A ESKAVDE basketball league managing to make its way to the finals where it lost to fellow city club PAS Giannina thus finishing in the 2nd place.

In 2018–19 season IBC won the A ESKAVDE championship and earned its promotion to Greek C Basket League undefeated with a total score of 22–0. In the finals Ioannina BC defeated G.E. Agriniou.

In 2019–20 season amidst the COVID-19 crisis, IBC earned its promotion to Greek B Basket League finishing 3rd before the league was decided to stop due to the coronavirus outbreak.

=== Players ===
==== Current roster ====
Ioannina B.C. roster
Players
Coaches

Pos.	No.	Nat.	Name	Ht.	Wt.
PG	4	(Greece)	Dimitris Zafeiroudis	1.82 m (6 ft 0 in)	78 kg (172 lb)
PG	8	(Greece)	Dimitris Vasis	1.87 m (6 ft 2 in)	80 kg (176 lb)
SG	11	(Greece)	Giorgos Ksiouras	1.97 m (6 ft 6 in)	87 kg (192 lb)
SG	7	(Greece)	Georgios Papayannis	1.93 m (6 ft 4 in)	89 kg (196 lb)
SF	9	(Greece)	Akis Karampinis	1.93 m (6 ft 4 in)	85 kg (187 lb)
SF	13	(Greece)	Antonis Chrysis	1.97 m (6 ft 6 in)	95 kg (209 lb)
SF	14	(Greece)	Filippos Zapsas	1.99 m (6 ft 6 in)	89 kg (196 lb)
PF	6	(Greece)	Giorgos Sfouggaris	1.96 m (6 ft 5 in)	95 kg (209 lb)
PF	12	(Greece)	Nikos Georgakis	2.04 m (6 ft 8 in)	102 kg (225 lb)
C	10	(Greece)	Spyros Stamiris	2.03 m (6 ft 8 in)	98 kg (216 lb)
C	5	(Greece)	Panagiotis Mpartzokas	2.02 m (6 ft 8 in)	98 kg (216 lb)
C	15	(Greece)	Christos Mpallas (C)	2.06 m (6 ft 9 in)	132 kg (291 lb)

Head coach

- (Greece) Giannis Papadopoulos

Assistant coach(es)

- (Greece) Michael Bathas

Athletic trainer(s)

- (Greece) Stefanos Xantzaras

Team manager

- (Greece) Stavros Vlachos

Legend

- (C) Team captain
- Injured

- Roster
Updated: August 13, 2020

==== Depth chart ====
Pos.	Starting 5	Bench 1	Bench 2
C	Christos Mpallas	Spyros Stamiris	Panagiotis Mpartzokas
PF	Nikos Georgakis	Giorgos Sfouggaris
SF	Antonis Chrysis	Akis Karampinis	Filippos Zapsas
SG	Giorgos Ksiouras	Giorgos Papagiannis
PG	Dimitris Zafeiroudis	Dimitris Vasis

=== Honours ===
- C ESKAVDE: Champions (2016)
- A ESKAVDE: 3rd place (2017)
- A ESKAVDE: 2nd place (2018)
- A ESKAVDE: Champions (2019)
- G ETHNIKI: 3rd place (2020)

=== Season by season ===
Season	Division	Pos.	Postseason	RS record	PO record
2015–16	C ESKAVDE	1st	-	10-0	-
2016–17	A ESKAVDE	3rd	Playoffs	15-3	3-3
2017–18	A ESKAVDE	2nd	Playoffs	16-2	2-2
2018–19	A ESKAVDE	1st	Playoffs	18-0	4-0
2019–20	G EΤΗΝΙΚΙ	3rd	-	12-5	-

== Youth Academy ==
The IBC youth academy is also based in Ioannina, Greece. In 2019-20 season the U16 team won the ESKAVDE regional championship.

=== Program ===
IBC youth system runs year round and offers full-time and short-time boarding that focus on player development. The system will produce improvement in both physical performance and in the understanding of the game. The program also focuses in introducing individuals in a collaborating environment in order for them to build a strong team spirit both on and off the court.

=== Vision ===
IBC has a well established academy branch in Metsovo and has the ambition to further expand in the region of Epirus. The club's vision is to create a solid pool of young athletes which will strengthen the men's team roster in the years to come.

== Women's basketball team ==
=== History ===
The women's team was founded in 2019 and has presence in A ESKAVDE league. The 2019-20 season was interrupted due to the CoVid-19 crisis after only one match.

== Wheelchair basketball team ==
=== History ===
The Wheelchair basketball team was founded in 2019 being the first team of Epirus region to join the OSEKA A2 National Division.

== Management and Personnel ==
=== Presidential history ===
Years	President
2015-2016	Aleksandros Sakkas
2016-2018	Konstantinos Papanikolaou
2018-	Georgios Zaragkas

=== Medical team ===
Position	Name
Club's doctor	(Greece) Konstantinos Ioannou
Physiotherapist	(Greece) Filippos Skordos

=== Staff ===
Position	Name
Men's team Coach	(Greece) Giannis Papadopoulos
Women's team Coach	(Greece) Vaggelis Avgerinos
Wheelchair team Coach	(Greece) Stefanos Xantzaras
Academies Director	(Greece) Giannis Papadopoulos
U20 Team Coach	(Greece) Kostas Krikonis
U16 Team Coach	(Greece) Kostas Krikonis
U14 Team Coach	(Greece) Apostolis Kanelopoulos
Juniors' Coach	(Greece) Thodoris Tsironis

=== Current sponsorships ===
- Gold Sponsor: Protergia
- Official Supporter: Nitsiakos Group, Welcome Stores, Daikkin
- Official Sport Clothing Supporter: CAP Sport
- Official Health Care Service Provider: Ippokrateio Diagnostic Center
- Academies Sponsor: Domaine Glinavos
