= Earl Harrison (basketball) =

American basketball player

Personal information
- Born: August 20, 1961 (age 65) Lindenwold, New Jersey, U.S.
- Listed height: 6 ft 7 in (2.01 m)
- Listed weight: 210 lb (95 kg)

Career information
- College: Gloucester County Community College (1979–1981); Morehead State University (1981–1984)
- NBA draft: 1984: 4th round, 91st overall pick
- Playing career: 1984–1994
- Position: Power forward / center

Career history
- 1984–1986: La Crosse Catbirds
- 1986–1988: Avenir de Rennes
- 1989–1992: Pagrati
- 1992: PAOK
- 1993–1994: APOEL Nicosia

Career highlights
- Greek League All-Star (1991); Cypriot Cup winner (1994); Cypriot Supercup winner (1994)
- Stats at Basketball Reference

Earl Harrison (born August 20, 1961) is an American former professional basketball player. Harrison grew up in Lindenwold, New Jersey. During his pro club career, he played at the power forward and center positions.

== College career ==
Harrison played college basketball at Morehead State University, with the Morehead State Eagles, from 1981 to 1984.

== Professional career ==
Harrison was drafted in the fourth round, with the 91st overall pick, of the 1984 NBA draft, by the Philadelphia 76ers. He played with the La Crosse Catbirds, in the Continental Basketball Association, in the 1985–86 season. Harrison also played with the Greek club Pagrati Athens, from 1989 to 1992.

In the 1991–92 season, he averaged 25.5 points and 13.4 rebounds per game in the Greek Basket League. Harrison transferred from Pagrati to the Greek club PAOK Thessaloniki in 1992, but due to a serious injury that he suffered, he was replaced in the team by Cliff Levingston. In the 1993–94 season, Jones played with the Cypriot League club APOEL Nicosia. With APOEL, he won the Cypriot Cup and the Cypriot Supercup.
