= Ioannis Demertzis (basketball) =

Greek coach and former basketball player

Iraklis Thessaloniki
- Title: Player development coach
- League: Greek A1 National Division

Personal information
- Born: July 20, 1983 (age 43) Panorama, Thessaloniki, Greece
- Listed height: 6 ft 5 in (1.96 m)
- Listed weight: 200 lb (91 kg)

Career information
- Playing career: 2005–2019
- Position: Point guard / Shooting guard
- Coaching career: 2020–present

Career history
- 2005–2006: I.C.B.S. Thessaloniki
- 2006–2007: Iraklis Thessaloniki
- 2007–2010: P.A.O.K. Thessaloniki
- 2010–2011: Iraklis Thessaloniki
- 2011–2012: Marousi
- 2012–2013: Keravnos Strovolos
- 2013: Ikaros Kallithea
- 2013–2014: Keravnos Strovolos
- 2014–2015: Ethnikos Piraeus
- 2015–2016: Kavala
- 2016–2017: Doxa Lefkada
- 2017–2018: Ermis Agia
- 2018–2019: Charilaos Trikoupis Messolonghi

Ioannis Demertzis (alternate spellings: Giannis, Yiannis) (Greek: Γιάννης Δεμερτζής; born July 20, 1983) is a Greek former professional basketball player. He is 1.96 m (6 ft 5 in) tall and is the current player development coach of Greek A1 National Division club Iraklis Thessaloniki.

== Professional career ==
After playing youth basketball with Mantoulidis, Demertzis started his pro playing career in 2005, in the Greek 2nd Division, playing with ICBS. In 2006, he moved to Iraklis, where he stayed only for one year. In 2007, he moved to PAOK Thessaloniki, where he stayed until 2010. He has also played with Marousi, Keravnos, Ikaros Kallitheas, Ethnikos Piraeus and Kavala.

He then moved to Holargos, but left the team without making any appearances in order to join the newly promoted Doxa Lefkadas of the Greek Basket League.

In 2018, he joined Apollon Patras. In 2019-2020 he moved to Harilaos Trikoupis B.C., making a good season.In 2020–2021 season he moved to Keravnos (Aghios Pavlos-Thessaloniki) B.C. Due to the COVID-19 pandemic, the league never started. In July 2021, he signed for Navarchos Votsis (Thessaloniki) B.C.
