= GS Agia Paraskevi =

Greek basketball club

- Founded: 1976
- Location: Agia Paraskevi, Athens
- Team colors: Black and Red
Home	Away

G.S. Agia Paraskevi (Greek: Γυμναστικός Σύλλογος Αγίας Παρασκευής) is a Greek basketball club based in Agia Paraskevi, Athens. It was founded in 1976 and is active in women basketball. The club had earlier long-time presence in A1 Ethniki women. The most successful season of the club was the season 1987-88 when it finished in 2nd place of the championship. The last season (2014–15) the club plays in the first local Attica division.

== History ==
G.S Agia Paraskevi was founded in 1976 by the merge of former minor local clubs. Soon it became one of the protagonists of the Greek Women Championship. In 1998 finished in 2nd place and the season 1992-93 played for first time in Europe in Liliana Ronchetti Cup. But the next seasons the club was weakened and was found in the lower divisions. The last time where it played in A1 Ethniki was the season 2005-06.

== Honours ==
- Greek Women's Basketball League
  - Finalist (1): 1988

== See also ==
Agia Paraskevi F.C., Basketball Agia Paraskevi, Α.Ε. Αγίας Παρασκευής, Α.Σ. Ολυμπιάδα Αγίας Παρασκεύης.
