= Palaio Faliro B.C. =

AOPF ΑΟΠΦ
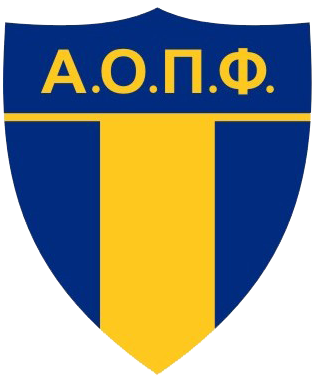
- Leagues: Greek A2 League; Greek Cup
- Founded: 1931
- History: 1931 - Present
- Arena: Sofia Befon Palaio Faliro Indoor Hall
- Capacity: 1,204
- Location: Palaio Faliro, Greece
- Team colors: Yellow and Navy Blue
- Head coach: Giannis Georgikopoulos
- Website: www.aopf.gr
| Home | Away |

Palaio Faliro B.C. (alternate spelling: Paleo Falirou) (Greek: Παλαιού Φαλήρου) is a Greek professional basketball club. The team is located in Palaio Faliro, a suburban town in the Athens agglomeration, Greece. The club has competed in the Greek Second Division. The club's full name is Athlitikos Omilos Palaio Falirou (Αθλητικός Όμιλος Παλαιού Φαλήρου), which is abbreviated as A.O.P.F. (Α.O.Π.Φ.).

== History ==
Palaio Faliro's parent athletic sports club was founded in 1926, with the athletic union's first sporting department being the football club. In 1928, the athletic union added the track and field section, and in 1929, it added swimming and volleyball sections. The basketball club was added in 1931, after the athletic union decided to abandon the football club, in favor of a basketball department.

== Arena ==
Palaio Faliro plays its home games at the Sofia Befon Palaio Faliro Indoor Hall. The seating capacity of the arena is 1,204 people.

== Division history ==
=== Men's team ===
- 1995–96: South Attica ESKANA Regional Championship
- 1996–97: Third National (4th-tier)
- 1997–98: Second National (3rd-tier)
- 1998–2005: A2 Division
- 2005–06: Second National
- 2006–08: A2 Division
- 2008–09: Second National
- 2009–11: Third National
- 2011–12: South Attica (ESKANA) Premier Division
- 2012–13: South Attica (ESKANA) Second Level

== Rankings ==
- 2002–03 Greek 2nd Division: 2nd
- 2007–08 Greek 2nd Division: 15th (7 wins, 23 losses and 30 games) - relegated
- 2009–10 Third National - Group 1 South: 5th
- 2010–11 Third National - Group 2 South: 13th (3 wins, 22 losses and 1 tie) - relegated
- 2012–13: South Attica (ESKANA) Second Division: 6th

== Result history ==
- 1996: South Attica (ESKANA) Cup: tied with Alimos
- 1997: South Attica (ESKANA) Cup: defeated Alimos
- 1999: Greek Cup, Round of 8: Aris - Paleo Faliro: 76–48

== Achievements ==
=== Men's team ===
- Third Division (1):

2006

- Fourth Division (2):

1997, 2020

- ESKANA South Attica Cup (1):

1997

=== Women's team ===
- Greek Women's League (2)

1975, 1982

== Notable players ==
Note: Flags indicate national team eligibility at FIBA-sanctioned events. Players may hold other non-FIBA nationalities not displayed.

Criteria

To appear in this section a player must have either:

- Set a club record or won an individual award while at the club
- Played at least one official international match for their national team at any time
- Played at least one official NBA match at any time.

- (Greece) Giannis Kalampokis
- (Greece) Lazaros Agadakos
- (Greece) Ioannis Gagaloudis
- (Greece) Leonidas Skoutaris
- (Greece) Christoforos Stefanidis

== Former presidents ==
- (Greece) Giorgos Velissarakos (1990s)
- (Greece) Kostas Sorotos (2000s)
