= Pagrati B.C. =

A.O. PAGKRATIOU
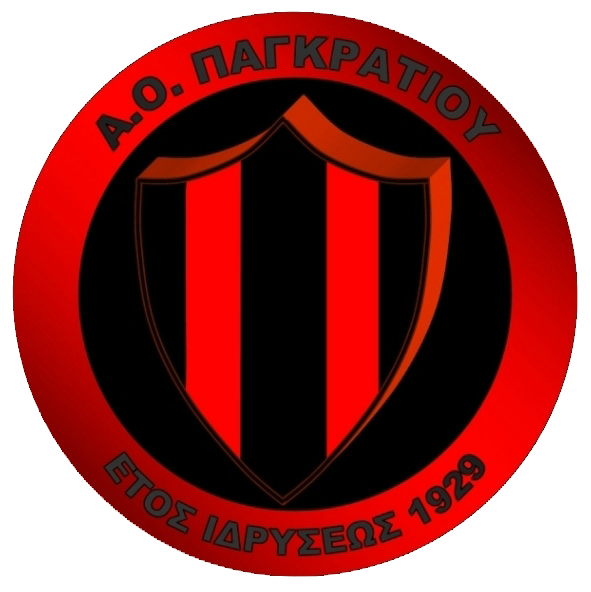
- Leagues: Greek 2nd Division; Greek Cup
- Founded: Parent Athletic Club: 1929; Basketball Club: 1938
- History: Pagrati B.C. 1938 – Present
- Arena: METS Indoor Hall
- Capacity: 1,500
- Location: Pangrati, Athens, Greece
- Team colors: Red and Black
- Head coach: Kostas Antonopoulos
- Website: pagratiao.gr
Home	Away

Pagrati B.C. (alternate spellings: Pagkrati, Pagratiou, Pagkratiou, Pangrati, Pangratiou, Pangkrati, Pangkratiou) is a Greek professional basketball club. The club is located in the Pangrati neighborhood of Athens, Greece. The team competes in the Greek 2nd Division.

== History ==
The A.O. Pagrati Athens parent sports athletic association was founded in 1929. The sport club's basketball department, Pagrati B.C., was founded in 1938. Around the era of 1950, was the basketball club's first peak period, which established it as one of the big Greek clubs of that era. In 1979, the team was in a downward spiral, as it was downgraded to the Greek 3rd Division.

In 1988, the club returned to the top-tier level Greek League, and it stayed in the top Greek Division for the next 6 years. After that 6-year run in the Greek top-tier level (A1), the club again struggled in the lower Greek divisions, until it was promoted up to the Greek 2nd Division, for the 2006–07 season.

== Arena ==
Pagrati B.C. plays its home games at the METS Indoor Hall, which is located in the Pangrati neighborhood of Athens. The arena features two basketball courts, as well as volleyball and handball courts. The arena is used by all of Pagrati's major athletic departments.

The volleyball teams of Panathinaikos VC Men and Panathinaikos VC Women, have also used the venue to host home games. The arena has also been used to judo matches. For basketball games, the arena has a seating capacity of 1,500 people.

== Season by season ==
Pagrati B.C. Athens
1938 · The men's basketball section of A.O. Pagrati Athens was founded.; 1964–65 · Basket League · 3rd; 1965–66 · Basket League · 7th; 1966–67 · Basket League · 7th; 1967–68 · Basket League · 8th; 1968–69 · Basket League · 3rd; 1969–70 · Basket League · 8th; 1970–71 · Basket League · 4th; 1971–72 · Basket League · 6th; 1972–73 · Basket League · 10th; 1973–74 · Basket League · 8th; 1974–75 · Basket League · 12th Relegated to B Basket League; 1975–76 · B Basket League · 3rd; Greek Cup · Phase D: 1976–77 · B Basket League; Greek Cup · Phase C: 1977–78 · B Basket League; Greek Cup · Phase B: 1978–79 · B Basket League; Greek Cup · Phase C: 1979–80 · B Basket League 11th Relegated to Regional League; Greek Cup · Phase B: 1980–81 · Regional League; 1981–82 · Regional League; 1982–83 · Regional League; 1983–84 · Regional League Promoted to B Basket League; 1984–85 · B Basket League · 7th; Greek Cup · Phase B Round 1: 1985–86 · B Basket League · 2nd; Greek Cup · Phase B Round 3: 1986–87 · A2 Basket League · 2nd; Greek Cup · Semifinals: 1987–88 · A2 Basket League · 4th; Greek Cup · Semifinals: 1988–89 · A2 Basket League · 2nd Promoted to Basket League; Greek Cup · Phase A Round 2: 1989–90 · Basket League · 10th; Greek Cup · Quarterfinals: 1990–91 · Basket League · 10th; Greek Cup · Round of 16: 1991–92 · Basket League · 11th; Greek Cup · Round of 16: 1992–93 · Basket League · 9th; Greek Cup · Semifinals: 1993–94 · Basket League · 10th; Greek Cup · Quarterfinals: 1994–95 · Basket League · 13th Relegated to A2 Basket League; Greek Cup · Round of 16: 1995–96 · A2 Basket League · 12th; Greek Cup · Phase A Round 2: 1996–97 · A2 Basket League · 13th Relegated to B Basket League; Greek Cup · Phase A Round 2: 1997–98 · B Basket League · 13th Relegated to C Basket League; Greek Cup · Phase A Round 1: 1998–99 · C Basket League · 2nd; 1999–00 · C Basket League · 2nd; 2000–01 · C Basket League · 2nd; 2001–02 · C Basket League · 2nd; 2002–03 · C Basket League · 2nd; 2003–04 · C Basket League · 2nd; 2004–05 · C Basket League · 4th Promoted to B Basket League; 2005–06 · B Basket League · 7th; Greek Cup · Phase A Round 1: 2006–07 · B Basket League · 3rd Promoted to A2 Basket League; Greek Cup · Phase A Round 2: 2007–08 · A2 Basket League · 8th; Greek Cup · Phase B Round 2: 2008–09 · A2 Basket League · 7th; Greek Cup · Phase B Round 1: 2009–10 · A2 Basket League · 3rd; Greek Cup · Phase A Round 1: 2010–11 · A2 Basket League · 10th; Greek Cup · Phase B Round 1: 2011–12 · A2 Basket League · 11th; Greek Cup · Phase A Round 1: 2012–13 · A2 Basket League · 10th; Greek Cup · Phase A: 2013–14 · A2 Basket League · 5th; Greek Cup · Phase A: 2014–15 · A2 Basket League · 8th; Greek Cup · Phase B Round 1: 2015–16 · A2 Basket League · 5th; Greek Cup · Phase A: 2016–17 · A2 Basket League · 16th Relegated to B Basket League; Greek Cup · Phase A: 2017–18 · B Basket League · 10th; Greek Cup · Phase A Round 3: 2018–19 · B Basket League · 4th Promoted to A2 Basket League; Greek Cup · Round of 16: 2019–20 · A2 Basket League · 13th (Note: Position in the standings at the time of the interruption of the league, due to the spread of the COVID-19 pandemic in Greece.); Greek Cup · Phase A Round 3: 2020–21 · A2 Basket League ·; Greek Cup · Phase A Round 3

== Notable players ==
Note: Flags indicate national team eligibility at FIBA-sanctioned events. Players may hold other non-FIBA nationalities not displayed.

Criteria

To appear in this section a player must have either:

- Set a club record or won an individual award while at the club
- Played at least one official international match for their national team at any time
- Played at least one official NBA match at any time.

Greece:

- Tasos Antonakis
- Efthimis Bakatsias
- Ioannis Chatzinikolas
- Ioannis Dimakos
- Stavros Elliniadis
- Georgios Gasparis
- Giannis Giannopoulos
- Panagiotis Kafkis
- Dinos Kalampakos
- Panagiotis Karatzas
- Ioannis Karamalegkos
- Alekos Kontovounisios
- Antonis Lanthimos
- Yorgos Lanthimos
- Nikos Liakopoulos
- Takis Maglos
- Nikos Michalos
- Filippos Moschovitis
- Spyros Motsenigos
- Stathis Papadionysiou
- - Nick Paulos
- Andreas Petropoulos
- Aris Raftopoulos
- Ioannis Rodostoglou
- Michalis Romanidis
- Vangelis Sakellariou
- Alexandros Sigkounas
- Vangelis Sklavos
- Aris Tatarounis
- Sakis Tzalalis
- Fotis Vasilopoulos
- Dimitris Lolas

Europe:

- - Bryan Bracey
- Slaviša Koprivica

USA:

- Earl Harrison
- John Hudson
- Thomas Jordan
- Richard Rellford
- Wayne Tinkle

Rest of Americas:

- Ian Lockhart

== Head coaches ==
- Mimis Stefanidis
- Aris Raftopoulos
- Johnny Neumann
- Makis Dendrinos
- - Steve Giatzoglou
- Rajko Toroman
- Apostolos Kontos
- Aris Lykogiannis
- Vassilis Fragkias
- Dimitris Papadopoulos
- Dinos Kalampakos
- Dimitris Liogas
- Giannis Giannopoulos
