= Greek C Basket League =

Fourth-tier men's basketball league in Greece

National League 2
- Sport: Basketball
- Founded: 1987
- No. of teams: 53
- Country: Greece
- Continent: (European Union) Europe
- Level on pyramid: 4th-tier (Greece)
- Promotion to: Greek National League 1
- Website: www.basket.gr

The Greek C Basket League, or Greek C Basketball League (Greek: Ελληνική Γ Μπάσκετ Λιγκ), is a national basketball league in Greece. It is the 4th-tier level of the basketball league system in Greece, and was founded in 1985. It is also known as National League 2. It is organized by the Hellenic Basketball Federation (E.O.K.).

It began in the 1987–88 season, and originally took place with a league format of two groups. Currently, the league consists of five groups, with an overall total of 53 teams.

== Champions ==
Season	South Group		North Group	
1987–88	Amyntas Athens		KAOD	
1988–89	Kronos Agiou Dimitriou - Zografou		Pierikos - Apollon Kalamarias	
Season	1st Group	2nd Group	3rd Group	4th Group
1989–90	Porfyras	Irakleio	VAO	Gymnastikos S. Larissas
1990–91	Ethnikos Piraeus	Apollon Athens	Ifaistos	Makedonikos
1991–92	Ionikos NF	Ampelokipoi	Olympiakos Volos	HAN Thessaloniki
1992–93	AGS Ioanninon	Kolossos Rodou	Olympia Larissa	Ikaroi Serron
1993–94	Asteras Exarchion	Chalkida	Niki Volos	VAO
1994–95	Amyntas Athens	GS Ilioupolis	Danaos Trikalon	Ifaistos
1995–96	Oiakas Nafpliou	Arion Athens	Niki Volos	Apollon Kalamarias
1996–97	Palaio Faliro	Alimos	Aias Evosmou	Kavala
1997–98	DAS Ano Liosion	OFI	Danaos Trikalon	Mantoulidis
1998–99	Aigaleo	Near East B.C.	EA Larissas	ICBS
1999–00	Panelefsiniakos	Chalkida	Olympiakos Volos	Xanthi
2000–01	Ilysiakos	Aigaleo	Siatista	Ambelokipi Thessaloniki
2001–02	Doukas School	Kolossos Rodou	Megas Alexandros	Mantoulidis
2002–03	Olympias Patras	Proodeftiki	Trikala 2000	Thermaikos
2003–04	Poseidon Kalamatas	Rethymno	Ermis Lagkada	Ikaroi Serron
2004–05	Pagrati	Ionikos Lamias	Trikala 2000	Panorama
2005–06	Keravnos Aigiou	Panerythraikos	Aiginiakos	Ikaroi Serron
2006–07	Lavrio	Ikaros Nea Smyrni	Goumenissa	Anagennisi Flogas
2007–08	Arkadikos	OFI	Aias Evosmou	Apollon Kalamarias
2008–09	AEK Argos	Panelefsiniakos	Mantoulidis	Megas Alexandros
2009–10	Doxa Lefkadas	Nea Kifissia	Aiolos Trikalon	Stratoni
2010–11	K.A.P.	Filathlitikos	Niki Volos	Chalkidona
2011–12	Esperos Patras	Enosi Iliou	Filippos Verias	Ionikos Ionias
2012–13	Polis Kallitheas	Livadeia	Argonaftis Kalamarias	Evropi Pefkohoriou
2013–14	Phoenix Larissas	Anatolia College	Promitheas Patras	Kymis
2014–15	Esperos Patras	Kronos Agiou Dimitriou	AEL 1964	Polygiros
2015–16	Apollon Smyrnis	Proteas Voulas	Ermis Agias	Gefyra
2016–17	Dafni Dafniou	Diagoras Aigaleo	Titanes Palama	Panathlitikos Sykeon
2017–18	Oiakas Nafpliou	Esperos Kallitheas	Filippos Verias	Eleftheroupoli Kavalas
2018–19	Aigaleo	Melission	PAS Giannina BC	Efkarpias
2019–20	Palaio Faliro	Zografou	Aiolos Trikalon	Lefkippos Xanthis

Season	1st Group	2nd Group	3rd Group	4th Group	5th Group	6th Group
2020–21	interrupted due to the outbreak of the COVID-19 pandemic					
2021–22	Aiolos Agyia	Milon Nea Smyrni	Mykonos	Spartakos Ioannina	Deka	Stavroupoli
2022–23	Near East	Anagennisi Arkalochori	Dafni	Sofades	Aretsou Kalamaria	K.A.O.D.
2023–24	Promitheas 2014	Ilysiakos	Holargos	Trikala	Evropi 87	
2024–25	Glavkos Esperos	Dafni Dafniou	Ionikos Nikaias	Pierikos Archelaos	Panorama	
