= Basketball Agia Paraskevi =

Basketball Agia Paraskevi K.A.P.
- Leagues: Greek C League
- Founded: 1986
- History: OFK Agia Paraskevi; 1986 – 2001; Basketball Agia Paraskevi; 2001 – present
- Arena: Kontopefko Municipal Indoor Hall
- Capacity: 1,000
- Location: Agia Paraskevi, Athens
- Team colors: Black and White
- Website: kapbc.gr
Home	Away

Basketball Agia Paraskevi (Greek: Καλαθοσφαίριση Αγίας Παρασκευής - Kalathosfairisi Agia Paraskevi), officially abbreviated as K.A.P. (Κ.Α.Π.), is a Greek basketball club that is based in Agia Paraskevi, Athens. It was founded in 1986, and so far it has twice played in the Greek 2nd Division.

The club currently plays in the Greek 4th Division.

== History ==
Agia Paraskevi was founded in 1986, with the merger of two of the local clubs of Agia Paraskevi, Keravnos and Pegasus. It was originally named O.F.K. Agia Paraskevi (Omilos Filon Kalathosfairisis Agias Paraskevis), but in 2001, it was renamed to its current name. In 2012, the club earned a league promotion up to the Greek 2nd Division, for first time in its history.

However, it only remained in the Greek 2nd Division for two years, and in 2014, it was relegated down again to the Greek 3rd Division. In the 2014–15 season, Agia Paraskevi finished in 11th place in the Greek 3rd Division, was again relegated down to the Greek 4th Division.

== Recent seasons ==
Season	Division	Tier	Place	Notes
2009–10	B Basket League	3	13th	Relegated to C Basket League
2010–11	C Basket League	4	1st	Promoted to B Basket League
2011–12	B Basket League	3	3rd	Promoted to A2 Basket League
2012–13	A2 Basket league	2	6th	
2013–14	A2 Basket League	2	14th	Relegated to B Basket League
2014–15	B Basket League	3	11th	Relegated to C Basket League
2015–16	C Basket League	4	3rd	Promoted to B Basket League
2016–17	B Basket League	3	16th	Relegated to C Basket League
2017–18	C Basket League	4	6th	
2018–19	C Basket League	4	11th	

== Notable players ==
Note: Flags indicate national team eligibility at FIBA-sanctioned events. Players may hold other non-FIBA nationalities not displayed.

Criteria

To appear in this section a player must have either:

- Set a club record or won an individual award while at the club
- Played at least one official international match for their national team at any time
- Played at least one official NBA match at any time.

- (Greece) Makis Nikolaidis

== Head coaches ==
- (Greece) Kostas Keramidas

== See also ==
- GS Agia Paraskevi
- Agia Paraskevi F.C.
