= Milon B.C. =

Milon
- League: Greek B Basket League
- Founded: 1928
- History: 1928–present
- Arena: Kroisos Persis Indoor Hall
- Capacity: 1,300
- Location: Nea Smyrni, Athens, Greece
- Team colors: Green and Black
- President: Michael Sakellaridis
- Head coach: Antonis Kourmoulis
- Championships: 1 Greek Elite League
- Website: https://www.aonsmilon.gr/
Home	Away

Milon B.C. or Milonas B.C. (Greek: Μίλων) is a professional basketball team, based in Nea Smyrni, Athens, Greece. It is a part of the multisport club AONS Milon. The club's home arena is the Milon Indoor Hall, which is also located in Nea Smyrni. The team's colours are green and black. For the 2026–27 season, the club will be competing in the Greek B Basket League, the third tier in the Greek basketball pyramid. During the club's history, it has competed in the Greek Basketball League, the first tier, three times in its history.

== History ==
The basketball section of the club was founded in the year 1937, nine years after the official founding of the parent athletic club (AONS Milon was founded in 1928). Milon played for many years in the second-tier division of Greece (Greek A2 League), and Greek B National League, in earlier years. The club achieved promotion to the top-tier level Greek Basket League for first time, in the 1993–94 season. That season, Milon had the top scorer of the Greek League championship, Mitchell Wiggins, but didn't achieve to remain in the first division, and was relegated down again to the Greek A2 League.

The club returned to the top Greek division in the 2000–01 season. That was the club's last season in the first division. During those years, several well-known players played in Milon, such as Mitchell Wiggins, Ioannis Sioutis, Vangelis Sklavos, and others. In recent years, the club has played in the lower level tiers of the Greek basketball league system.

In 2010, Milon was relegated to the A ESKANA, the local regional championship of Athens, or the 5th tier of the Greek basketball league system. After almost a decade in the local Athens regional championship, Milon was promoted to the 4th-tier level Greek C National League in 2019. During the 2020–21 season, Milon was leading the Greek C Basket League's 2nd Group, with a record of 3–0. However, the season was canceled due to the COVID-19 pandemic in Greece.

The club was crowned Champion in the C National League (2nd Group) for the 2021–22 season, winning first place, promotion to the Greek B Basket League, The Greek third-tier division. But only one season, they promoted again in the 2022–23 to earn its place to Greek Elite League.

For the 2023–24 season, Milon competed to the Greek Elite League. After finishing 3rd in the regular season, Milon gained the promotion to the Greek Basket League for the first time after 23 years. In 2023–24, it won the A2 championship but ultimately did not declare its participation in the top division. Thus, within two years, it won 3 consecutive champion titles at the national level. Milon will compete in the third-tier Greek B Basket League for 2024–25 after a decision by the administration.

== Arena ==
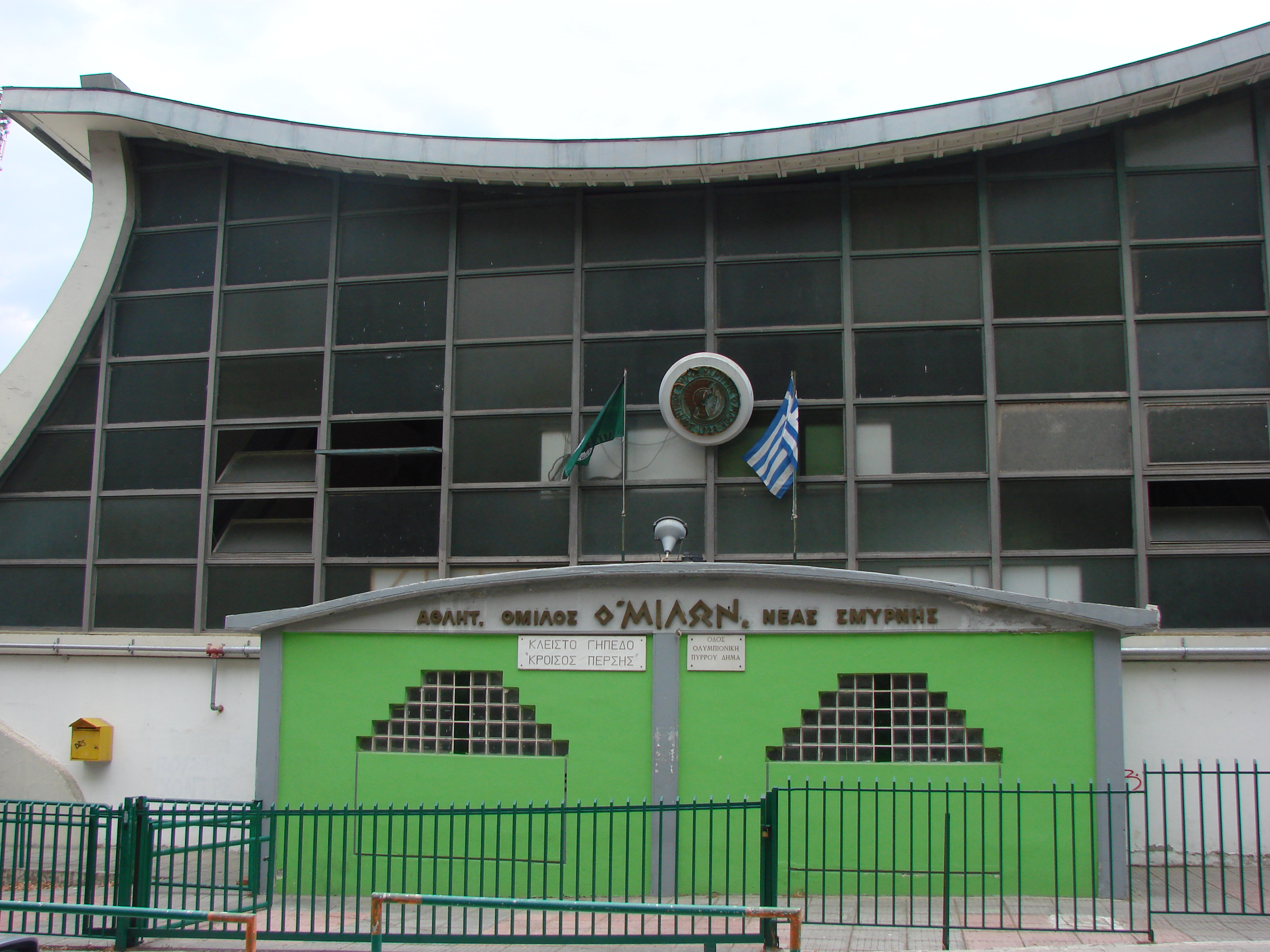
Milon Gymnasium

Milon plays its home games at the 1,300-seat Kroisos Persis Indoor Hall, which is also known as the Milon Indoor Hall.

== Roster ==
Note: Flags indicate national team eligibility at FIBA-sanctioned events. Players may hold other non-FIBA nationalities not displayed.

Milon B.C. roster
Players	Coaches
Pos. / No. / Nat. / Name / Ht. / Wt. / Age	Head coach: Assistant coach(es); Trainer; Physical Therapist; Team Manager; Legend: (C) Team captain; Injured; Roster; Updated: 19 May 2024

== Notable players ==
Note: Flags indicate national team eligibility at FIBA-sanctioned events. Players may hold other non-FIBA nationalities not displayed.

Criteria

To appear in this section a player must have either:

- Set a club record or won an individual award while at the club
- Played at least one official international match for their national team at any time
- Played at least one official NBA match at any time.

- (Greece) Ioannis Sioutis
- (Greece) Vangelis Sklavos
- (United States) Kendrick Johnson
- (United States) Gary Leonard
- (United States) Mitchell Wiggins

== Head coaches ==
- (Greece) Kostas Anastasatos
- (Greece) George Dikaioulakos
- (Greece) Nikos Karagiannis
- (Greece) Takis Panoulias
- (Greece) George Philippakis
- (Greece) Dimitris Aposkitis
- (Greece) Kostas Mourouzis
- (Greece) Phaedon Matthaiou
- (Greece) Achilleas Menzos
- (Greece) Giannis Sgouros
- (Greece) Apostolos Kontos
- (Greece) David Stergakos
- (Greece) Nikos Pavlou
