= 2022–23 AEK B.C. season =

AEK Athens BC 2022-23 basketball season

AEK
2022–23 season
- Chairman: Makis Angelopoulos
- Head coach: Ilias Kantzouris (1–Playoffs)
- Arena: Ano Liosia Olympic Hall
- Greek League: 6th
- Greek Cup: Semifinals
- Champions League: Quarterfinals

The 2022–23 AEK B.C. season is AEK's 66th season in the top-tier level Greek Basket League. AEK competed in three different competitions during the season. The team participated in Trofeo d’Abruzzo, a pre-season tournament, and finished second after losing the final to German side Bayern Munich of the BBL. In December 2022, a BCL single athletic judge imposed sanctions to the Greek basketball club for the incidents that occurred before the start of the second group stage game against the Italian side UnaHotels Reggio Emilia.

== Transfers 2022–23 ==
=== Players In ===
No.	Pos.	Nat.	Name	Age	Moving from		Type	Ends	Transfer fee	Date	Source
12	PF	(Greece)	Panagiotis Filippakos	28			Contract extension	June 30, 2024		July 1, 2022	
24	SG	(United States)	Kenny Williams	25	Kolossos Rodou	(Greece)	Transfer	June 30, 2023	Free	July 10, 2022	
	SF	(Greece)	Nikos Persidis	27	Lavrio	(Greece)	Transfer	June 30, 2023	Free	July 13, 2022	
8	SF	(United States)	Cameron McGriff	24	Capitanes de Arecibo	(Puerto Rico)	Transfer	June 30, 2023	Free	July 19, 2022	
20	C	(Finland)	Alexander Madsen	27	VEF Riga	(Latvia)	Transfer	June 30, 2023	Free	July 25, 2022	
25	PF	(United States)	Akil Mitchell	30	Brose Bamberg	(Germany)	Transfer	June 30, 2023	Free	August 2, 2022	
	PG	(Greece)	Zois Karampelas	21	Larisa	(Greece)	Transfer	June 30, 2025	Free	August 9, 2022	
32	SG	(Latvia)	Jānis Strēlnieks	32	Žalgiris Kaunas	(Lithuania)	Transfer	June 30, 2023	Free	August 10, 2022	
22	C	(Greece)	Dimitrios Mavroeidis	37			Contract extension	June 30, 2023		August 16, 2022	
2	PG	(United States)	Tim Frazier	31	Cleveland Cavaliers	(United States)	Transfer	June 30, 2023	Free	August 24, 2022	
23	PG	(Greece)	Kostas Papadakis	23	Iraklis	(Greece)	Transfer	June 30, 2023	Free	August 26, 2022	
4	PG	(Greece)	Vassilis Xanthopoulos	38	Kolossos Rodou	(Greece)	Transfer	June 30, 2023	Free	August 26, 2022	
15	PF	(United States)	Isaiah Miles	28	Promitheas Patras	(Greece)	Transfer	June 30, 2023	Free	November 18, 2022	
11	SF	(Greece)	Vlado Janković	32	PAOK	(Greece)	Transfer	June 30, 2023	Free	January 20, 2023	
19	C	(Greece)	Costis Gontikas	28	Karditsa	(Greece)	Transfer	June 30, 2023	Free	January 20, 2023	
9	C	(Spain)	Pierre Oriola	30	Bàsquet Girona	(Spain)	Transfer	June 30, 2023	Free	February 22, 2023	
0	SG	(United States)	Brynton Lemar	28	Le Mans	(France)	Transfer	June 30, 2023	Free	February 23, 2023	

=== Players Out ===
No.	Pos.	Nat.	Name	Age	Moving to		Type	Transfer fee	Date	Source
	SG	(United States)	Keith Langford	39	Free agent				June 30, 2022	
	SG	(Canada)	Andy Rautins	35	Free agent				June 30, 2022	
	PF	(United States)	Ian Hummer	32	Galatasaray	(Turkey)			June 30, 2022	
	PF	(United States)	Eric Griffin	32	Hapoel Eilat	(Israel)			June 30, 2022	
	PG	(Spain)	Quino Colom	33	Bàsquet Girona	(Spain)			July 10, 2022	
	SG	(Colombia)	Braian Angola	28	Galatasaray	(Turkey)			July 24, 2022	
	PG	(Greece)	Michalis Karlis	19	Dornbirn Lions	(Austria)			August 4, 2022	
	PG	(Greece)	Zois Karampelas	21	Apollon Patras	(Greece)	Loan		August 9, 2022	
	PF	(Greece)	Ioannis Kouzeloglou	27	Lavrio MEGABOLT	(Greece)			November 24, 2022	
	SG	(Greece)	Nikos Pappas	32	Panathinaikos	(Greece)			December 3, 2022	
	SF	(Greece)	Nikos Persidis	27	Peristeri	(Greece)			December 17, 2022	
	PF	(Greece)	Panagiotis Filippakos	28	Apollon Patras	(Greece)			December 19, 2022	
	PG	(United States)	Tim Frazier	31	SIG Strasbourg	(France)			February 21, 2023	
	SF	(United States)	Cameron McGriff	25	Le Mans	(France)			February 27, 2023	
	PF	(United States)	Akil Mitchell	30	Grises de Humacao	(Puerto Rico)			April 29, 2023	

== Friendlies ==
Win Loss Draw

3 September 2022 Friendly 1	Panathinaikos (Greece)	vs.	(Greece) AEK	Marousi
00:00 (EET)
				Arena: Olympic Indoor Hall

10 September 2022 Friendly 2	AEK (Greece)	77–72	(Greece) Lavrio	Ano Liosia
18:00 (EET)
		Boxscore		Arena: Ano Liosia Olympic Hall

14 September 2022 Friendly 3	PAOK (Greece)	81–79	(Greece) AEK	Pylaia
17:00 (EET)
		Boxscore		Arena: Pylaia Sports Arena

17 September 2022 Fasouras Cup	AEK (Greece)	67–69	(Romania) Cluj-Napoca	Peristeri
15:30 (EET)
		Boxscore		Arena: Andreas Papandreou Indoor Hall

18 September 2022 Fasouras Cup	PAOK (Greece)	59–65	(Greece) AEK	Peristeri
15:00 (EET)
		Boxscore		Arena: Andreas Papandreou Indoor Hall

24 September 2022 Trofeo d'Abruzzo	Tezenis Verona (Italy)	78–81	(Greece) AEK	Teramo
19:00 (EET)
		Boxscore

25 September 2022 Trofeo d'Abruzzo	Bayern Munich (Germany)	76–59	(Greece) AEK	Teramo
21:00 (EET)
		Boxscore

29 September 2022 Friendly 4	AEK (Greece)	82–60	(Greece) Ionikos	Ano Liosia
16:00 (EET)
		Boxscore		Arena: Ano Liosia Olympic Hall

== Competitions ==
=== Overall ===
Competition	Started round	Current position / round	Final position / round	First match	Last match
Greek League	Matchday 1	—	6th	9 October 2022	27 April 2023
Greek Cup	Round of 16	—	Semifinals	16 February 2023	18 February 2023
Champions League	Group Stage	—	Quarterfinals	4 October 2022	19 April 2023

Updated to match played April 27, 2023
Source: GBL Games & Results, BCL Games & Results

=== Overview ===
Competition	Record							
Competition	Pld	W	D	L	PF	PA	PD	Win %
Greek League	24	12	0	12	1,840	1,886	−46	50.00
Greek Cup	2	1	0	1	158	165	−7	50.00
Champions League	17	10	0	7	1,271	1,280	−9	58.82
Total	43	23	0	20	3,269	3,331	−62	53.49

Last updated: April 27, 2023
Source: GBL Games & Results, BCL Games & Results

=== Greek League ===
==== Results summary ====
Overall						Home					Away				
Pld	W	L	PF	PA	PD	W	L	PF	PA	PD	W	L	PF	PA	PD
22	12	10	1668	1686	−18	7	4	860	843	+17	5	6	808	843	−35

Last updated: April 9, 2023.
Source: GBL Rankings

==== Results by round ====
Round	1	2	3	4	5	6	7	8	9	10	11	12	13	14	15	16	17	18	19	20	21	22
Ground	H	H	A	H	A	H	A	H	A	H	A	A	A	H	A	H	A	H	A	H	A	H
Result	W	W	W	L	W	W	L	W	L	L	L	W	W	W	L	L	W	W	L	W	L	L
Position	2	2	2	4	3	3	3	3	3	6	7	6	4	3	3	6	3	3	4	4	6	6

Updated to match(es) played on April 9, 2023. Source: GBL Fixtures
A = Away; H = Home; W = Win; D = Draw; L = Loss

==== Regular season ====
Win Loss

9 October 2022 1	AEK	79–63	Karditsa	Ano Liosia
19:15 (EET)
		Boxscore		Arena: Ano Liosia Olympic Hall

15 October 2022 2	AEK	83–68	Apollon Patras	Ano Liosia
16:00 (EET)
		Boxscore		Arena: Ano Liosia Olympic Hall

23 October 2022 3	Peristeri bwin	80–84	AEK	Peristeri
15:45 (EET)
		Boxscore		Arena: Peristeri Arena

29 October 2022 4	AEK	63–76	Aris	Ano Liosia
15:45 (EET)
		Boxscore		Arena: Ano Liosia Olympic Hall

5 November 2022 5	Lavrio MEGABOLT	67–84	AEK	Lavrio
19:15 (EET)
		Boxscore		Arena: Lavrio Indoor Hall

19 November 2022 6	AEK	92–77	Ionikos	Ano Liosia
17:00 (EET)
		Boxscore		Arena: Ano Liosia Olympic Hall

28 November 2022 7	Kolossos H Hotels	73–67	AEK	Rhodes
15:45 (EET)
		Boxscore		Arena: Kallithea Palais des Sports

3 December 2022 8	AEK	73–70	Promitheas	Ano Liosia
19:15 (EET)
		Boxscore		Arena: Ano Liosia Olympic Hall

11 December 2022 9	Panathinaikos	71–57	AEK	Marousi
19:15 (EET)
		Boxscore		Arena: Nikos Galis Olympic Indoor Hal

27 December 2022 10	AEK	71–83	PAOK mateco	Ano Liosia
19:15 (EET)
		Boxscore		Arena: Ano Liosia Olympic Hall

8 January 2023 11	Olympiacos	111–71	AEK	Piraeus
19:15 (EET)
		Boxscore		Arena: Peace and Friendship Stadium

14 January 2023 12	Karditsa	64–70	AEK	Karditsa
19:15 (EET)
		Boxscore		Arena: Karditsa New Indoor Arena

21 January 2023 13	Apollon Patras	61–69	AEK	Patras
19:15 (EET)
		Boxscore		Arena: Apollon Patras Indoor Hall

28 January 2023 14	AEK	68–64	Peristeri bwin	Ano Liosia
16:00 (EET)
		Boxscore		Arena: Ano Liosia Olympic Hall

4 February 2023 15	Aris	74–64	AEK	Thessaloniki
19:15 (EET)
		Boxscore		Arena: Alexandreio Melathron

11 February 2023 16	AEK	81–95	Lavrio MEGABOLT	Ano Liosia
19:15 (EET)
		Boxscore		Arena: Ano Liosia Olympic Hall

4 March 2023 17	Ionikos	79–98	AEK	Nikaia
17:00 (EET)
		Boxscore		Arena: Nikaias Platonas Indoor Hall

11 March 2023 18	AEK	95–89	Kolossos H Hotels	Ano Liosia
19:15 (EET)
		Boxscore		Arena: Ano Liosia Olympic Hall

30 March 2023 19	Promitheas	85–72	AEK	Patras
19:15 (EET)
		Boxscore		Arena: Dimitris Tofalos Arena

25 March 2023 20	AEK	77–73	Panathinaikos	Ano Liosia
19:15 (EET)
		Boxscore		Arena: Ano Liosia Olympic Hall

1 April 2023 21	PAOK mateco	78–72	AEK	Thessaloniki
19:15 (EET)
		Boxscore		Arena: P.A.O.K. Sports Arena

9 April 2023 22	AEK	78–85	Olympiacos	Ano Liosia
15:45 (EET)
		Boxscore		Arena: Ano Liosia Olympic Hall

==== Results overview ====
Win Loss Draw

Opposition	Home score	Away score	Double
Aris	63–76	74–64	127–150
Apollon Patras	83–68	61–69	152–129
Ionikos	92–77	79–98	190–156
Karditsa	79–63	64–70	149–127
Kolossos H Hotels	95–89	73–67	162–162
Lavrio MEGABOLT	81–95	67–84	165–162
Olympiacos	78–85	111–71	149–196
Panathinaikos OPAP	77–73	71–57	134–144
PAOK mateco	71–83	78–72	143–161
Peristeri bwin	68–64	80–84	152–144
Promitheas Patras	73–70	85–72	145–155

==== Quarterfinals ====
Win Loss

23 April 2023 1st Round	Peristeri bwin	87–73	AEK	Peristeri
19:15 (EET)
		Boxscore		Arena: Peristeri Arena

27 April 2023 2nd Round	AEK	99–113 (OT)	Peristeri bwin	Ano Liosia
19:15 (EET)
		Boxscore		Arena: Ano Liosia Olympic Hall

=== Greek Cup ===
Win Loss

Quarterfinals

16 February 2023 Final-8	Panionios	88–93 (OT)	AEK	Crete
15:45 (EET)
				Arena: Heraklion Indoor Sports Arena

Semifinals

18 February 2023 Final-8	AEK	65–77	Peristeri bwin	Crete
15:45 (EET)
				Arena: Heraklion Indoor Sports Arena

=== FIBA Champions League ===
==== Regular season - Group B ====
Pos	Team	Pld	W	L	PF	PA	PD	Pts	Qualification	BON	AEK	KAR	REG
1	(Germany) Telekom Baskets Bonn	6	5	1	499	443	+56	11	Advance to round of 16	—	80–72	83–71	84–88
2	(Greece) AEK	6	3	3	458	448	+10	9	Advance to play-ins	66–73	—	80–72	68–59
3	(Turkey) Pınar Karşıyaka	6	2	4	467	490	−23	8	Advance to play-ins	80–89	91–88	—	83–76
4	(Italy) Reggiana	6	2	4	436	479	−43	8		66–90	73–84	74–70	—

Source: Groups Standings
Legend: Blue = home team win; Red = away team win.

==== Results summary ====
Overall						Home					Away				
Pld	W	L	PF	PA	PD	W	L	PF	PA	PD	W	L	PF	PA	PD
6	3	3	458	448	+10	2	1	214	204	+10	1	2	244	244	0

Last updated: December 21, 2022.
Source: BCL Group B Results

==== Results by round ====
Round	1	2	3	4	5	6
Ground	A	A	H	A	H	H
Result	L	W	L	L	W	W
Position	3	1	3	4	2	2

Updated to match(es) played on December 21, 2022. Source: BCL Group B Fixtures
A = Away; H = Home; W = Win; D = Draw; L = Loss

==== Regular season ====
Win Loss

4 October 2022 1	Pinar Karşıyaka (Turkey)	91–88	(Greece) AEK Athens	İzmir
18:30 (EET)
		Boxscore		Arena: Karşıyaka Arena

12 October 2022 2	UnaHotels Reggio Emilia (Italy)	73–84	(Greece) AEK Athens	Reggio Emilia
21:30 (EET)
		Boxscore		Arena: PalaBigi

25 October 2022 3	AEK Athens (Greece)	66–73	(Germany) Telekom Baskets Bonn	Ano Liosia
19:30 (EET)
		Boxscore		Arena: Ano Liosia Olympic Hall

23 November 2022 4	Telekom Baskets Bonn (Germany)	80–72	(Greece) AEK Athens	Bonn
21:00 (EET)
		Boxscore		Arena: Telekom Dome

7 December 2022 5	AEK Athens (Greece)	68–59	(Italy) UnaHotels Reggio Emilia	Ano Liosia
19:30 (EET)
		Boxscore		Arena: Ano Liosia Olympic Hall

21 December 2022 6	AEK Athens (Greece)	80–72	(Turkey) Pinar Karşıyaka	Ano Liosia
19:30 (EET)
		Boxscore		Arena: Ano Liosia Olympic Hall

==== Results overview ====
Win Loss

Opposition	Home score	Away score	Double
(Italy) UnaHotels Reggio Emilia	68–59	73–84	152–132
(Germany) Telekom Baskets Bonn	66–73	80–72	138–153
(Turkey) Pinar Karşıyaka	80–72	91–88	168–163

==== Play-ins ====
Win Loss

4 January 2023 1	AEK Athens (Greece)	73–70	(Turkey) Tofaş	Ano Liosia
19:30 (EET)
		Boxscore		Arena: Ano Liosia Olympic Hall

10 January 2023 2	Tofaş (Turkey)	82–85	(Greece) AEK Athens	Bursa
19:00 (EET)
		Boxscore		Arena: Tofaş Nilüfer Spor Salonu

Win Loss

Opposition	1st leg	2nd leg	3rd leg
(Turkey) Tofaş	73–70	82–85	–

==== Round of 16 - Group K ====
Pos	Team	Pld	W	L	PF	PA	PD	Pts	Qualification	UNI	AEK	GAL	CSP
1	(Spain) Unicaja Málaga	6	5	1	494	434	+60	11	Advance to quarter-finals	—	88–66	81–76	99–88
2	(Greece) AEK	6	4	2	455	447	+8	10	Advance to quarter-finals	65–75	—	92–78	82–72
3	(Turkey) Galatasaray Nef	6	2	4	457	463	−6	8		72–67	71–81	—	100–73
4	(France) Limoges CSP	6	1	5	432	494	−62	7		67–84	63–69	69–60	—

Source: Round of 16 Standings
Legend: Blue = home team win; Red = away team win.

==== Results summary ====
Overall						Home					Away				
Pld	W	L	PF	PA	PD	W	L	PF	PA	PD	W	L	PF	PA	PD
6	4	2	455	447	+8	2	1	239	225	+14	2	1	216	222	−6

Last updated: March 21, 2023.
Source: BCL Group K Results

==== Results by round ====
Round	1	2	3	4	5	6
Ground	A	A	H	A	H	H
Result	L	W	W	W	W	L
Position	3	2	2	2	2	2

Updated to match(es) played on March 21, 2023. Source: BCL Group K Fixtures
A = Away; H = Home; W = Win; D = Draw; L = Loss

==== Round of 16 ====
Win Loss

25 January 2023 1	Unicaja Málaga (Spain)	88–66	(Greece) AEK Athens	Málaga
21:30 (EET)
		Boxscore		Arena: Palacio de Deportes José María Martín Carpena

31 January 2023 2	Galatasaray Nef (Turkey)	71–81	(Greece) AEK Athens	Istanbul
19:00 (EET)
		Boxscore		Arena: Sinan Erdem Dome

7 February 2023 3	AEK Athens (Greece)	82–72	(France) Limoges	Ano Liosia
19:30 (EET)
		Boxscore		Arena: Ano Liosia Olympic Hall

7 March 2023 4	Limoges (France)	63–69	(Greece) AEK Athens	Limoges
21:30 (EET)
		Boxscore		Arena: Palais des Sports de Beaublanc

15 March 2023 5	AEK Athens (Greece)	92–78	(Turkey) Galatasaray Nef	Ano Liosia
19:30 (EET)
		Boxscore		Arena: Ano Liosia Olympic Hall

21 March 2023 6	AEK Athens (Greece)	65–75	(Spain) Unicaja Málaga	Ano Liosia
19:30 (EET)
		Boxscore		Arena: Ano Liosia Olympic Hall

==== Results overview ====
Win Loss

Opposition	Home score	Away score	Double
(Spain) Unicaja Málaga	65–75	88–66	131–163
(Turkey) Galatasaray Nef	92–78	71–81	173–149
(France) Limoges	82–72	63–69	151–135

==== Quarterfinals ====
Win Loss

4 April 2023 1	Hapoel Jerusalem (Israel)	64–55	(Greece) AEK Athens	Jerusalem
21:00 (EET)
		Boxscore		Arena: Pais Arena

12 April 2023 2	AEK Athens (Greece)	94–78	(Israel) Hapoel Jerusalem	Ano Liosia
19:30 (EET)
		Boxscore		Arena: Ano Liosia Olympic Hall

19 April 2023 3	Hapoel Jerusalem (Israel)	91–51	(Greece) AEK Athens	Jerusalem
19:00 (EET)
		Boxscore		Arena: Pais Arena

Win Loss

Opposition	1st leg	2nd leg	3rd leg
(Israel) Hapoel Jerusalem	64–55	94–78	91–51
