= Barlos =

Barlos (Greek: Μπάρλος) is a Greek surname. Notable people with the surname include:

- Loukas Barlos (1920–1999), Greek businessman
- Nikos Barlos (born 1979), Greek basketball player and coach
