= Andrea Mazzon =

Italian basketball coach

- Mazzon in March 2026

Reyer Venezia
- Position: Head coach
- League: Lega Basket Femminile; EuroLeague Women

Personal information
- Born: 23 February 1966 (age 60) Venice, Italy
- Coaching career: 1990–present

Career history

Coaching
- 1990–1996: Scaligera Basket Verona (youth & assistant)
- 1996–1998: Scaligera Basket Verona
- 1998–2000: Panionios
- 2000–2001: Aurora Basket Jesi
- 2001–2002: Andrea Costa Imola
- 2002–2004: Basket Napoli
- 2005–2007: Aris Thessaloniki
- 2007–2008: Fortitudo Bologna
- 2008–2009: Aris Thessaloniki
- 2010–2013: Reyer Venezia
- 2015–2016: Delaware 87ers (assistant)
- 2016: Guangzhou Loong Lions
- 2017: Avtodor Saratov
- 2018: Orlandina Basket
- 2018–2019: Basket Ravenna
- 2021–present: Reyer Venezia (women)
- 2022–2023: Italy U-20 (women)
- 2025–2026: Turkey (women)

Career highlights
- FIBA Korać Cup champion (1998); LBF champion (2024); Italian Super Cup champion (2024)

Andrea Mazzon (born 23 February 1966) is an Italian professional basketball coach, currently managing Reyer Venezia of the Lega Basket Femminile (LBF) and the EuroLeague Women. He is also the head coach of the Turkish women's national team.

== Career ==
Mazzon is the second Italian coach, after Ettore Messina, in terms of the number of European finals reached. He won the FIBA Korać Cup in 1998 and also reached the final in 1996 and 2007.

He was voted Italian Coach of the Year in 1997. In 1999 and 2007 he served as head coach of the Greek All-Star Game.

On 12 January 2010, he returned to Italy and was appointed head coach of Reyer Venezia. On 13 November 2013, he was dismissed after recording only one victory in the opening games of the season, being replaced by Zare Markovski.

On 27 October 2015, he became the new assistant coach of the Delaware 87ers.

On 28 October 2025, Mazzon was appointed head coach of the Turkish women's national team. In a statement issued by the Turkish Basketball Federation on October 15, 2026, it was announced that the federation had parted ways with Andrea Mazzon.
