= Makis Nikolaidis =

Greek-Cypriot basketball player

Makis Nikolaidis Μάκης Νικολαΐδης
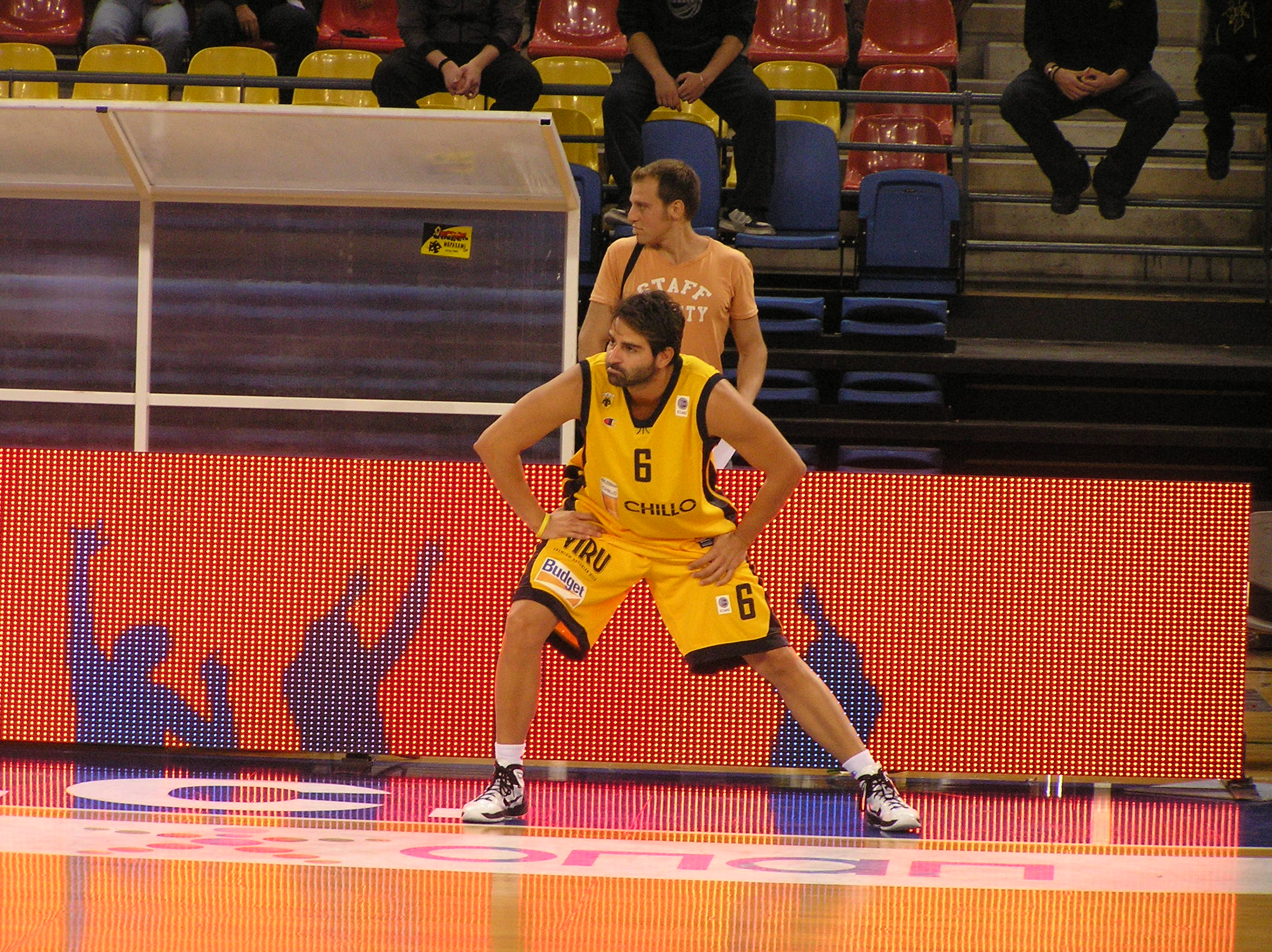
- Nikolaidis, in 2011.

Personal information
- Born: July 13, 1978 (age 48) Kavala, Greece
- Listed height: 6 ft 7 in (2.01 m)
- Listed weight: 225 lb (102 kg)

Career information
- Playing career: 1994–present
- Position: Shooting guard / small forward

Career history
- 1994–1996: GAS Komotini
- 1996–1999: AEK Athens
- 1999–2000: Esperos Kallitheas
- 2000–2001: Apollon Limassol
- 2001–2002: Ionikos NF
- 2002–2003: Aris Thessalaoniki
- 2003–2004: Maroussi
- 2004–2005: Ionikos NF
- 2005–2006: Olympia Larissa
- 2006–2007: AEK Athens
- 2007: Virtus Bologna
- 2007–2008: Aigaleo
- 2008–2009: Trikala 2000
- 2009–2011: AEK Athens
- 2011–2012: Maroussi
- 2012: Apollon Limassol
- 2012: Kavala
- 2012–2013: Apollon Limassol
- 2014: Agia Paraskevi
- 2016–2017: AE Santorinis
- 2018–2019: Ethnikos Piraeus

Career highlights
- 2× Greek League All-Star (2010, 2011); Greek All-Star Game 3 Point Shootout Champion 2008

Prodromos "Makis" Nikolaidis (alternate spelling: Nikolaides) (Greek: Πρόδρομος "Μάκης" Νικολαΐδης; born July 13, 1978) is a former Greek-Cypriot professional basketball player. At a height of 2.01 m (6 ft 7 in) tall, and 102 kg (225 lb) in weight, he could play both the shooting guard and small forward positions. During his playing career, Nikolaidis possessed great shooting ability. In 2008, he won the 3-point shootout competition of the Greek League All-Star Game.

== Professional career ==
In 2003, Nikolaidis won the EuroCup Challenge championship, while playing with Aris Thessaloniki. In 2004, he was a EuroChallenge finalist, while playing with Maroussi. He spent the 2007–08 season with Aigaleo. Nikolaidis moved to Trikala 2000 for the 2008–09 season. He then moved to AEK Athens. In September 2012, he joined New Basket Brindisi, for a trial period.

He joined Ethnikos Piraeus in 2018.

== Awards and accomplishments ==
- FIBA EuroCup Challenge Champion: (2003)
- Greek All-Star Game 3 Point Shootout Champion: (2008)
- 2× Greek League All-Star: (2010, 2011)
