= John Hudson (basketball, born 1966) =

American basketball player (born 1966)

Personal information
- Born: July 6, 1966 Anderson, South Carolina
- Listed height: 205 cm (6 ft 9 in)
- Listed weight: 225 lb (102 kg)

Career information
- College: San Jacinto (1985–1987); South Carolina (1987–1989)
- NBA draft: 1989: undrafted
- Position: Power forward

Career history
- 1990–1992: Panionios
- 1992–1993: Pagrati
- 1993–1996: Bnei Herzlyia
- 1996–1997: Peiraikos Syndesmos
- 1997: Olympique Antibes
- 1997–1999: Sporting
- 2000: Elitzur Ashkelon

Career highlights
- Greek Cup winner (1991); 2× Greek League All-Star (1991, 1996 II); Greek League Slam Dunk Contest Champion (1991); Israeli State Cup winner (1995)

John Henry Hudson (born July 6, 1966) is a retired American professional basketball player. He was a 2.05m (6'8 3/4") tall power forward.

== College career ==
Born in Anderson, South Carolina, Hudson played college basketball at San Jacinto Junior College, and at the University of South Carolina.

== Professional career ==
In 1990, Hudson signed with Panionios of the Greek Basket League. He also played with Pagrati, Bnei Herzliya, Peiraikos, Olympique Antibes, Sporting, and Eltizur Ashkelon. In 1991, he won the Greek Cup title, while playing with Panionios, and in 1995, he won the Israeli State Cup, while playing with Bnei Herzliya. He was also a Greek Cup semifinalist in 1993, while playing with Pagrati, and an Israeli State Cup finalist in 1996, while playing with Bnei Herzliya.

Hudson won the first Greek All-Star Game Slam Dunk Contest on December 28, 1991, where he broke the basketball backboard during the contest.
