= Christos Charissis =

Greek basketball player

Personal information
- Born: July 9, 1976 (age 50) Athens, Greece
- Listed height: 6 ft 3 in (1.91 m)
- Listed weight: 200 lb (91 kg)

Career information
- Playing career: 1996–2012
- Position: Point guard

Career history
- 1996–1997: Arion
- 1997–2002: Irakleio
- 2002: TAU Vitoria
- 2002–2004: Olympiacos
- 2004–2005: Apollon Patras
- 2005–2006: Olympiacos
- 2006: Montepaschi Siena
- 2006–2007: Olympiacos
- 2007–2008: Prokom Trefl Sopot
- 2008–2009: PAOK
- 2009–2010: Kolossos Rodou
- 2010–2012: Irakleio

Career highlights
- Spanish League champion (2002); 3× Greek League All-Star (2002, 2003, 2005); Polish League champion (2008); Polish Cup winner (2008)

Christos Charissis (alternate spellings: Charisis, Harissis, Harisis) (Greek: Χρήστος Χαρίσης; born July 9, 1976) is a retired Greek professional basketball player. At 191 cm or 6'3" in height, he played at the point guard position.

== Professional career ==
In his professional club career, Charissis was a member of the following clubs: Arion, Irakleio, Saski Baskonia, Olympiacos Piraeus, Apollon Patras, Siena, Sopot, PAOK Thessaloniki, and Kolossos Rodou.

With Saski Baskonia, he won the Spanish ACB League championship in the 2001–02 season. With Sopot, he won the Polish League championship and the Polish Cup title, in the 2007–08 season.

== National team career ==
Charissis was a member of the junior national teams of Greece. He played with Greece's Under-20 national team, at the 1998 FIBA Europe Under-20 Championship. Charissis was also a member of the senior men's Greek national team. He played with Greece's senior team at the 2003 FIBA EuroBasket.

== Awards and accomplishments ==
- 3× Greek League All-Star: (2002, 2003, 2005)
- Spanish League Champion: (2002)
- Polish League Champion: (2008)
- Polish Cup Winner: (2008)
