= Henry Turner (basketball) =

American basketball player (born 1966)

Personal information
- Born: August 18, 1966 (age 60) Oakland, California, U.S.
- Listed height: 6 ft 7 in (2.01 m)
- Listed weight: 215 lb (98 kg)

Career information
- High school: Fremont (Oakland, California)
- College: Cal State Fullerton (1984–1988)
- NBA draft: 1988: undrafted
- Playing career: 1988–2002
- Position: Shooting guard / small forward
- Number: 4, 9

Career history
- 1988–1989: Rochester Flyers
- 1989–1990: Sacramento Kings
- 1990–1991: Emmezeta Udine
- 1991–1992: Collado Villalba
- 1992–1993: Panna Firenze
- 1993–1994: Panionios
- 1994–1995: Sacramento Kings
- 1995–1998: Fenerbahçe
- 1998: Ducato Siena
- 1999–2000: Maroussi
- 2000–2001: BingoSNAI Montecatini
- 2001–2002: Müller Verona
- 2002: Adecco Milano

Career highlights
- Greek League Top Scorer (1994); 2× Greek League All-Star (1994 I, 1999); 2× Greek All-Star Game Slam Dunk champion (1994 I, 1999)
- Stats at NBA.com
- Stats at Basketball Reference

Henry Frank Turner (born August 18, 1966) is an American former professional basketball player, who played at the shooting guard and small forward positions. He grew up in Oakland, California.

== College career ==
Turner played college basketball at California State University, Fullerton, with the Cal State Fullerton Titans. He graduated in 1988.

== Professional career ==
Turner had a two-season stint in the NBA, with the Sacramento Kings (1989–90 and 1994–95), he averaged three points and one rebound per game, in 66 regular season games combined.

In Europe, Turner played mainly in Italy in the top-tier Lega Basket Serie A, representing Emmezeta Udine (Italian 2nd Division), Panna Firenze (Italian 2nd Division), Ducato Siena (Jun–Oct 1998), BingoSNAI Montecatini, Müller Verona, and Adecco Milano). He also had spells in Turkey, with the Turkish League club Fenerbahçe, and in Greece, with the Greek Basket League clubs Panionios and Maroussi.

While playing in Greece for Panionios during the 1993–94 season, Turner thrilled the crowds with his slam dunks. Both came together in one memorable first-half performance against PAOK in the semi-final of the Korać Cup. Turner scored 30 points in the first half, including a 360-degree dunk. However, their play declined in the second-half, losing a 20-point lead and eventually the game by a score of 83–85. Turner scored 37 total points in the game.

While playing with Fenerbahçe, Turner was granted Turkish citizenship, and played under the name Hakkı Uzun.

== Post-playing career ==
Turner retired from playing basketball in 2002, at age 36, and went on to work as a basketball analyst for Comcast, with co-hosts Jim Kozimor, Kayte Christensen, and Lafayette Lever, covering Sacramento Kings games.

== Career statistics ==
Legend
| GP | Games played | GS | Games started | MPG | Minutes per game |
| FG% | Field goal percentage | 3P% | 3-point field goal percentage | FT% | Free throw percentage |
| RPG | Rebounds per game | APG | Assists per game | SPG | Steals per game |
| BPG | Blocks per game | PPG | Points per game | **Bold** | Career high |

=== NBA ===
==== Regular season ====
| Year | Team | GP | GS | MPG | FG% | 3P% | FT% | RPG | APG | SPG | BPG | PPG |
|---|---|---|---|---|---|---|---|---|---|---|---|---|
| 1989–90 | Sacramento | **36** | **1** | **8.8** | **.475** | .000 | **.615** | **1.4** | **.6** | **.5** | **.2** | **4.3** |
| 1994–95 | Sacramento | 30 | 0 | 5.0 | .404 | **.400** | .571 | .9 | .2 | .3 | .0 | 2.3 |
| Career | | 66 | 1 | 7.0 | .453 | .250 | .600 | 1.2 | .4 | .4 | .1 | 3.4 |
