= Giannis Giannoulis =

Greek-Canadian basketball player (born 1976)

AEPS Aiolikos Mytilnis
- League: Greek 4th Division

Personal information
- Born: June 5, 1976 (age 50) Toronto, Canada
- Listed height: 6 ft 10 in (2.08 m)
- Listed weight: 255 lb (116 kg)

Career information
- Playing career: 1992–present
- Position: Center / power forward
- Number: 15, 16

Career history
- 1992–2001: PAOK
- 2001–2002: Panathinaikos
- 2002–2003: Yakima SunKings
- 2003: Huntsville Flight
- 2003–2004: Panionios
- 2004: Málaga
- 2004–2005: Kyiv
- 2006: Sevilla
- 2006–2007: Aris
- 2007–2009: Panionios
- 2009–2010: AEL Limassol
- 2010–2011: Vouliagmeni
- 2012–2013: Doukas
- 2013–2014: Vouliagmeni
- 2014–2015: Iraklis Kozanis
- 2015–2016: Argonaftis Kalamarias
- 2017–2018: MENT
- 2018–2019: APAS Ta Fanaria Naxou
- 2019–2020: Akrata Achaias
- 2021–2022: Asteras Ippodromiou
- 2022–present: AEPS Aiolikos Mytilnis

Career highlights
- EuroLeague champion (2002); All-EuroLeague Second Team (2001); FIBA EuroChallenge All-Star (2005); 2× Greek Cup winner (1995, 1999); 5× Greek League All-Star (1996 II, 1997, 1999, 2004, 2008); Ukrainian Super League champion (2005)
Medals
Men's basketball
Representing Greece
FIBA Europe Under-16 Championship
Gold medal – first place	1993 Turkey	Under-16

Giannis Giannoulis (alternate spellings: Gioannis, Yannis, Ioannis, Yiannis [Greek: Γιάννης Γιαννούλης; born June 5, 1976]) is a Greek-Canadian former professional basketball player. During his playing career, at a height of 2.08 m (6 ft 10 in) tall, he played at both the power forward and center positions.

== Early years ==
Giannoulis was born on 5 June 1976, in Toronto, Canada. Considered a great young talent at the center position, Giannoulis began playing youth club basketball in Greece, with the junior youth teams of Filathlitikos Karditsa and Ampelokipoi. After spending time with the youth teams of Esperos Kallitheas in 1992, he joined the junior team of PAOK Thessaloniki, where he played from 1992 to 1994. With PAOK, he won the Greek Under-18 club championship, in 1994.

== Professional career ==
=== Europe ===
Giannoulis began his pro career with the senior men's club of PAOK Thessaloniki. He was an All-EuroLeague Second Team member in the EuroLeague 2000–01 season, while playing with PAOK. In the next season, he won the EuroLeague 2001–02 championship, with Panathinaikos Athens. A failed drug test, at the end of the 2001–02 season, cost Giannoulis a ban from all European continental competitions for 2 years, which was a great blow to his career.

=== United States ===
Giannoulis played with the NBA club the Toronto Raptors, during the 2002–03 NBA preseason, under the name of "Ioannis Giannoulis". He then signed with the Yakima SunKings, of the Continental Basketball Association, in November 2002. He also played with the Huntsville Flight (later known as the Canton Charge), of the NBA D-League, during the 2002–03 season, after joining the club in February 2003. After playing with the Flight in just two games, Giannoulis requested to be waived from the D-League team, and then returned to the Greek League.

=== Return to Europe ===
After playing professionally in the United States during his drug ban, Giannoulis returned to Europe to play in the Greek League, for the 2003–04 season. Giannoulis played with Panionios in the European-wide secondary level EuroCup competition's 2007–08 season, and had a very good individual season; and that same year, in the Greek League 2007–08 season, he helped to lead Panionios to a 3–2 series playoff victory over Maroussi, in the league's next season's 3rd place EuroLeague qualifier series. He then played with Panionios in the following EuroLeague 2008–09 season.

In his club career, Giannoulis played with some of the following European teams: PAOK Thessaloniki, Panathinaikos Athens, Panionios, Málaga, Kyiv, Sevilla, Aris Thessaloniki, AEL Limassol, and Doukas. During his career, he competed at the highest European club level, the EuroLeague, in a total of eight seasons (1994–95, 1997–98, 1998–99, 1999–00, 2000–01, 2001–02, 2006–07, 2008–09). In those eight seasons, he played in a total of 94 EuroLeague games, in which he averaged 6.7 points and 4.1 rebounds per game.

Giannoulis played with the Cypriot League club AEL Limassol in the 2009–10 season. After that, he began a long career playing in the Greek minor leagues, starting with the Greek club Vouliagmeni, in the 2010–11 season.

== National team career ==
=== Greek junior national team ===
Giannoulis was a member of the junior national teams of Greece. With Greece's junior national teams, he played at the 1993 FIBA Europe Under-16 Championship, where he won a gold medal. He also played with Greece at the 1994 FIBA Europe Under-18 Championship, and at the 1996 FIBA Europe Under-20 Championship.

=== Greek senior national team ===
Giannoulis was also a member of the senior men's Greek national team. He competed with Greece at the 1997 EuroBasket, the 1999 EuroBasket, and the 2001 EuroBasket. After being banned from continental competitions for two years, due to a failed drug test, he was removed from the senior Greek national team and he was never recalled to it after that. With Greece's senior national team, he had a total of 63 caps.
