= Dušan Vukčević =

Serbian professional basketball player and assistant coach

Personal information
- Born: 14 November 1975 (age 51) Sarajevo, SR Bosnia and Herzegovina, SFR Yugoslavia
- Listed height: 2.02 m (6 ft 8 in)
- Listed weight: 88 kg (194 lb)

Career information
- NBA draft: 1997: undrafted
- Playing career: 1993–2012
- Position: Shooting guard / small forward
- Number: 6, 14, 20
- Coaching career: 2021–2021

Career history

Playing
- 1993–1994: Aix Maurienne Savoie
- 1994–1995: Red Star Belgrade
- 1995–1996: Apollon Patras
- 1996–1997: Radnički Beograd
- 1997–2001: Olympiacos Piraeus
- 2001–2002: Real Madrid
- 2002–2004: Montepaschi Siena
- 2004: Olympiacos Piraeus
- 2005: Ülkerspor
- 2005–2006: Olimpia Milano
- 2006–2007: Virtus Bologna
- 2007–2008: Olimpia Milano
- 2008–2010: Virtus Bologna
- 2010–2011: Rimini Crabs
- 2011–2012: Scaligera Verona

Coaching
- 2022–2023: Peristeri Athens (assistant)

Career highlights
- As player: FIBA EuroChallenge champion (2009); Spanish League All-Star (2001 II); Italian League champion (2004); 2× Greek League All-Star (1997, 2001); Turkish Cup winner (2005)

Dušan Vukčević (Serbian Cyrillic: Душан Вукчевић; born 14 November 1975) is a Serbian retired professional basketball player and coach who last served as an assistant coach for Peristeri Athens of the Greek Basket League and the Basketball Champions League. He also holds Greek citizenship under the name Ntousan (or Dousan) Tsalikis-Vouktsevits. Being 2.02 m tall, he played at the shooting guard and small forward positions. Vukčević played in the 1999 EuroLague Final Four, the 2003 Euroleague Final Four and the 2004 Euroleague Final Four.

== Professional career ==
Vukčević was born in Sarajevo, and he played in the youth teams of Bosna Sarajevo and Red Star Belgrade. He started his pro club career with Aix Maurienne Savoie, of the French 2nd Division, in the 1993–94 season. He then moved to Red Star Belgrade, for the 1994–95 season.

After that he moved to Greece, where he first played with the Greek Basket League club Apollon Patras, and then later with Olympiacos Piraeus, where he played four years. While he was a member of Olympiacos, he attained a Greek passport. In the 2001–02 season, he joined the Spanish ACB League club Real Madrid.

In 2003, he moved to Montepaschi Siena, where he won the first Italian League championship in the club's history. In 2005, he played with the Turkish Super League club Ülkerspor. He later played in Italy with Olimpia Milano, Virtus Bologna, Basket Rimini, and Scaligera Verona, where he last played in the 2011–12 season.

During his pro career, Vukčević played in the European-wide top-tier level EuroLeague, in a total of 10 seasons, and he made it to the league's Final Four three times, in 1999, 2003, and 2004.

== National team career ==
Vukčević was a member of the senior men's Serbia and Montenegro national team, from 1999 to 2003. With Serbia and Montenegro, he played at the 2003 FIBA EuroBasket, in Sweden. Over seven tournament games played, he averaged 4.0 points, 1.0 rebound and 0.3 assists per game.

== Sportscasting career ==
Since he has Greek citizenship, and speaks Greek fluently, after his playing pro career ended, Vukčević became a basketball game commentator on Greek TV.

== Coaching career ==
Vukčević began working as a basketball coach in 2022, when he joined the Greek Basket League club Peristeri Athens. He was signed to work for the club as an assistant coach, under the team's head coach, Vassilis Spanoulis.

== Personal life ==
Vukčević is married to Swedish businesswoman Jade Cicak. They have two sons. Their older son, Tristan (born 2003), is a professional basketball player that has played in the NBA with the Washington Wizards.
