= Tony White (basketball) =

American basketball player

Personal information
- Born: February 15, 1965 (age 61) Charlotte, North Carolina, U.S.
- Listed height: 6 ft 2 in (1.88 m)
- Listed weight: 170 lb (77 kg)

Career information
- High school: Independence (Charlotte, North Carolina)
- College: Tennessee (1983–1987)
- NBA draft: 1987: 2nd round, 33rd overall pick
- Drafted by: Chicago Bulls
- Playing career: 1987–2000
- Position: Point guard
- Number: 11, 4

Career history
- 1987: Chicago Bulls
- 1987: New York Knicks
- 1987–1988: Golden State Warriors
- 1988: Presto Ice Cream
- 1988–1989: La Crosse Catbirds
- 1989: Reussbühl Rebels
- 1989–1990: La Crosse Catbirds
- 1990–1992: Leuven
- 1992–1993: Castors Braine
- 1993–1994: AEK Athens
- 1994–1995: Aris
- 1995–1996: Olympique Antibes
- 1996–1998: Fórum Filatélico
- 1998: Papagou
- 1998–1999: Maccabi Rishon LeZion
- 2000: TDK Manresa

Career highlights
- Spanish League Top Scorer (1998); 2× Greek League All-Star (1994 I, 1994 II); Greek All-Star Game MVP (1994 I); French League All-Star (1996); French All-Star Game MVP (1996); CBA champion (1990); Third-team All-American – AP, UPI (1987); SEC Player of the Year – UPI (1987)
- Stats at NBA.com
- Stats at Basketball Reference
Medals
Men's basketball
Representing United States
FIBA AmeriCup
Gold medal – first place	1993 San Juan

Tony F. White (born February 15, 1965) is an American former professional basketball player. He was a 6-foot-2-inch (188 cm), 170-pound (77 kg) point guard. He played for three teams in the National Basketball Association (NBA) before pursuing a career in Europe. Born in Charlotte, North Carolina White played for Independence High School of his hometown, before enrolling to Tennessee to play college basketball.

== College career ==
Tony White was born in Charlotte, North Carolina. He played collegiately at the University of Tennessee from 1983 to 1987. He is third all-time leading scorer for Tennessee with 2,219 points. He appeared in 127 games averaging 17.5 points per game. He also holds the school record for most points scored in a single game with 51.

== Professional career ==
White was selected by the Chicago Bulls with the 10th pick in the 2nd round of the 1987 NBA draft. In his only season (1987–88) he played 2 games for the Bulls, registering no statistics. He split the remainder of the season with the New York Knicks and the Golden State Warriors. After he left in NBA, he played for Presto Ice Cream in Philippine Basketball Association in the Philippines.

White won a Continental Basketball Association (CBA) championship with the La Crosse Catbirds in 1990.

He played in Greece with AEK, Aris, and Papagou. He was also signed briefly by Žalgiris Kaunas for the 1998–1999 season, but left the team before the season started. Žalgiris went on to win the Euroleague title in 1999.

== Personal life ==
His son, Tony White Jr. played for the College of Charleston Cougars men's basketball team from 2006 to 2010. In 2019, White was diagnosed with Leukemia.

== Career statistics ==
Legend
GP	Games played	GS	Games started	MPG	Minutes per game
FG%	Field goal percentage	3P%	3-point field goal percentage	FT%	Free throw percentage
RPG	Rebounds per game	APG	Assists per game	SPG	Steals per game
BPG	Blocks per game	PPG	Points per game	**Bold**	Career high

=== NBA ===
==== Regular season ====
Year	Team	GP	GS	MPG	FG%	3P%	FT%	RPG	APG	SPG	BPG	PPG
1987–88	Chicago	2	0	1.0	–	–	–	.0	.0	.0	.0	.0
1987–88	New York	12	0	9.8	.370	.000	.692	.3	.8	.1	.0	3.6
1987–88	Golden State	**35**	0	**13.2**	**.463**	.000	**.732**	**.8**	**1.4**	**.5**	**.1**	**6.2**
Career		49	0	11.9	.446	.000	.722	.6	1.2	.4	.0	5.3
