= HEBA Greek All-Star Game =

Defunct professional men's basketball League in Greece

HEBA All-Star Game
- ΕΣΑΚΕ All-Star Game
- Sport: Basketball
- Founded: 1991
- Folded: 2024
- Country: Greece
- Continent: Europe
- Website: www.esake.gr

The HEBA Greek All-Star Game, also known as the EKO Greek All-Star Game for sponsorship reasons, was the All-Star Game of the Hellenic Basketball Association (HEBA) (Greek: ΕΣΑΚΕ) professional men's basketball competition. The HEBA Greek all-star game includes players that currently play in HEBA's top-tier level Greek Basketball League (GBL). The HEBA Greek all-star game was originally founded and organized by Gus Sarianides.

On 3 July 2024, ESAKE decided that the All-Star Game would no longer continue.

== Format ==
The HEBA Greek men's all-star game has most often been played in a format featuring the Greek All-Stars, versus the Rest of the World All-Stars, although it has also included several other format variations over the years. Only players that play in Greece's first-tier level Greek Basketball League (GBL) are eligible to become official HEBA Greek all-star selections. There is also a men's slam dunk competition, and a men's 3-point shootout competition. Players from lower level divisions are eligible to compete in both the all-star weekend's slam dunk and 3-point shootout contests.

The Greek all-star weekend also features a game between under age 22 players and senior age players (players that are retired professionals), called the Rising Stars versus the All-Time Stars. There are also youth 3-point shootout and youth slam dunk competitions, for the age 22 and under players. In the past, the Greek all-star weekend also featured an age 20 and under all-star game, called the Hopes or Youth All-Star Game.

== Logos ==
(The current official logo of the HEBA Greek All-Star Game.)

(The previous official logo of the HEBA Greek All-Star Game.)

== History ==
The HEBA Greek All-Star Game was held for the first time on December 31, 1991, and in that first game, "The Rest of the World All-Stars" defeated "The Greek All-Stars", by a score of 133–122. Over the next seven all-star games, the format was "The European All-Stars" versus "The American All-Stars". From 2001 until 2019, the format was the same as the original all-star game was, The Greek All-Stars versus The Rest of the World All-Stars. Since 2001, the Greek All-Star Game has been held in various cities in Greece, which is in contrast to the early years of the all-star game, when most of the games were held at either the Peace and Friendship Stadium, or Nikos Galis Olympic Indoor Hall arenas in Athens.

== All-Star Game results ==
Season Date	Winners	Losers	Score	Arena	Location	MVP Team
1991–92; 12/31/91	Rest of the World; All-Stars	Greek; All-Stars	133–122	Peace and Friendship Stadium	Piraeus, Athens	(United States) Brian Vaughns; Peristeri
1992–93; Not Held	Not Held	Not Held	Not Held	Not Held	Not Held	None
1993–94; 4/10/94 (I)	American; All-Stars	European; All-Stars	115–104	Peace and Friendship Stadium	Piraeus, Athens	(United States) Tony White; Aris
1994–95; 12/22/94 (II)	European; All-Stars	American; All-Stars	94–88	Peace and Friendship Stadium	Piraeus, Athens	(Croatia) Stojko Vranković; Panathinaikos
1995–96; 1/6/96 (I)	American; All-Stars	European; All-Stars	124–113	O.A.C.A Olympic Indoor Hall	Maroussi, Athens	(United States) Dominique Wilkins; Panathinaikos
1996–97; 12/14/96 (II)	European; All-Stars	American; All-Stars	83–75	Alexandrio Melathron	Thessaloniki	(Federal Republic of Yugoslavia) Peja Stojaković; PAOK
1997–98; 11/22/97	European; All-Stars	American; All-Stars	127–108	Perivola Indoor Hall	Perivola, Patras	(Federal Republic of Yugoslavia) Peja Stojaković (2×); PAOK
1998–99; 11/21/98	European; All-Stars	American; All-Stars	124–114	O.A.C.A. Olympic Indoor Hall	Maroussi, Athens	(Croatia) Arijan Komazec; Olympiacos
1999–00; 11/20/99	American; All-Stars	European; All-Stars	119–118	O.A.C.A. Olympic Indoor Hall	Maroussi, Athens	(Federal Republic of Yugoslavia) Dejan Bodiroga; Panathinaikos
2000–01; 1/20/01	Greek; All-Stars	Rest of the World; All-Stars	86–85	Perivola Indoor Hall	Perivola, Patras	(Greece) Fragiskos Alvertis; Panathinaikos
2001–02; 2/16/02	Rest of the World; All-Stars	Greek; All-Stars	126–125	Dimitris Krachtidis Indoor Hall	Drama	(Turkey) İbrahim Kutluay; Panathinaikos
2002–03; 3/30/03	Greek; All-Stars	Rest of the World; All-Stars	115–110	Tasos Kambouris Hall	Chalkis	(Greece) Georgios Diamantopoulos; Panionios
2003–04; 3/28/04	Greek; All-Stars	Rest of the World; All-Stars	102–89	Nea Ionia Indoor Hall	Volos	(Greece) Nestoras Kommatos; Aris
2004–05; 4/10/05	Greek; All-Stars	Rest of the World; All-Stars	77–76	Dimitris Tofalos Arena	Patras	(Greece) Nikos Barlos; Apollon Patras
2005–06; 2/26/06	Greek; All-Stars	Rest of the World; All-Stars	97–97 (tie)	Neapolis Indoor Arena	Larissa	(Greece) Sofoklis Schortsanitis; Olympiacos
2006–07; 2/4/07	Rest of the World; All-Stars	Greek; All-Stars	99–87	Chalkiopoulio Sports Hall	Lamia	(United States) Andre Hutson; Panionios
2007–08; 4/12/08	Rest of the World; All-Stars	Greek; All-Stars	111–101	Amaliada Indoor Hall	Amaliada	(North Macedonia) / (United States) Jeremiah Massey; Aris
2008–09; 3/15/09	Greek; All-Stars	Rest of the World; All-Stars	127–93	Xanthi Arena	Xanthi	(Greece) Ioannis Bourousis; Olympiacos
2009–10; 3/14/10	Greek; All-Stars	Rest of the World; All-Stars	147–114	Heraklion Arena	Heraklion	(Greece) Sofoklis Schortsanitis (2×); Olympiacos
2010–11; 3/13/11	Greek; All-Stars	Rest of the World; All-Stars	141–122	Giorgos Vassilakopoulos Indoor Hall	Pyrgos	(Greece) Antonis Fotsis; Panathinaikos
2011–12; Not Held	Not Held	Not Held	Not Held	Not Held	Not Held	None
2012–13; 3/10/13	Rest of the World; All-Stars	Greek; All-Stars	131–125	Perivola Indoor Hall	Perivola, Patras	(United States) Brent Petway; Rethymno
2013–14; 3/9/14	Greek; All-Stars	Rest of the World; All-Stars	123–122	Kladissos Indoor Hall	Chania	(Greece) Nikos Pappas; Panathinaikos
2014–15; Not Held	Not Held	Not Held	Not Held	Not Held	Not Held	None
2015–16; Not Held	Not Held	Not Held	Not Held	Not Held	Not Held	None
2016–17; Not Held	Not Held	Not Held	Not Held	Not Held	Not Held	None
2017–18; 2/11/18	Rest of the World; All-Stars	Greek; All-Stars	144–137	Dimitris Tofalos Arena	Patras	(Greece) Thanasis Antetokounmpo; Panathinaikos
2018–19; 2/10/19	Greek; All-Stars	Rest of the World; All-Stars	149–146	Alexandrio Melathron	Thessaloniki	(Greece) Thanasis Antetokounmpo (2×); Panathinaikos
2019–20; 2/9/20	Team; Mačiulis	Team; Calathes	109–104	Heraklion Arena	Heraklion	(Greece) Dinos Mitoglou; Panathinaikos
2020–21; Not Held	Not Held	Not Held	Not Held	Not Held	Not Held	None
2021–22; Not Held	Not Held	Not Held	Not Held	Not Held	Not Held	None
2022–23; 12/18/22	Team; Vezenkov	Team; Papagiannis	137–112	O.A.C.A. Olympic Indoor Hall	Maroussi, Athens	(Bulgaria) / (Greece) Sasha Vezenkov; Olympiacos
2023–24; 12/17/23	Team; Walkup	Team; Sloukas	177–165	Giannis Bourousis Arena	Karditsa	(United States) Isaiah Canaan; Olympiacos

=== Players with most MVP awards ===
Player	Wins	Editions
(Serbia) (Greece) Predrag Stojakovic	2	1997, 1998
(Greece) Thanasis Antetokounmpo	2	2018, 2019
(Greece) Sofoklis Schortsanitis	2	2006, 2010

== Score sheets ==
- 1st All-Star Game 1991–92:

DATE: 31 December 1991
VENUE: SEF
SCORE: World - Greece 133–122

TEAM GREECE: (Coach: Michalis Kyritsis): Nasos Galakteros 14, Kostas Patavoukas 10, Minas Gekos 3, Lefteris Subotić 6, Panos Fasoulas 17, Bane Prelević 23, Jon Korfas 22, Argiris Papapetrou 4, Liveris Andritsos 6, Fanis Christodoulou 9, Dimitris Papadopoulos 2, Nikos Fasouras 6, Nikos Galis (DNP), Panagiotis Giannakis (DNP).

WORLD TEAM: (Coach: Vlado Djurović): Derrick Hamilton 6, David Ancrum 23, Levertis Robinson 10, Thomas Jordan 14, Antonio Davis 12, John Hudson 16, Melvin Cheatum 2, Ken Barlow 13, Brian Vaughns 19, Edgar Jones 8, Earl Harrison 10.

- 2nd All-Star Game 1993–94:

DATE: April 10, 1994 (I)
VENUE: SEF
SCORE: USA - Europe 115–104

TEAM EUROPE: (Coach: Giannis Ioannidis): Fanis Christodoulou 15, Panagiotis Giannakis 17, Achilleas Demenagas, Žarko Paspalj 23, Angelos Koronios 7, Stavros Elliniadis, Zoran Savić 31, Thodoros Aposkitis, Dimitris Podaras, Georgios Sigalas 7, Georgios Makaras 2, Argiris Papapetrou 2, Nikos Galis (DNP).

TEAM USA: (Coaches: Michalis Kyritsis / Vangelis Alexandris): Tony White 24, Brent Scott 13, Derrick Chievous 19, Todd Mitchell 10, Henry Turner 11, Lance Berwald 2, Gary Plummer 14, Ed Stokes 0, Mitchell Wiggins, 20.

- 3rd All-Star Game 1994–95:

DATE: December 22, 1994 (II)
VENUE: SEF
SCORE: Europe - USA 94–88

TEAM EUROPE: (Coach: Giannis Ioannidis): Efthimis Bakatsias 3, Georgios Sigalas 6, Panagiotis Giannakis 2, Bane Prelević 9, Tzanis Stavrakopoulos 11, Fragiskos Alvertis 7, Panos Fasoulas 10, Stojko Vranković 20, Nasos Galakteros, Zoran Savić 13, Sasha Volkov 7, Jure Zdovc 6.

TEAM USA: (Coach: Lefteris Subotić): Melvin Cheatum 6, Chris King, Lance Berwald 2, Travis Mays 6, Eddie Johnson 8, Tony White 25, Mitchell Wiggins 3, Brent Scott 3, Tony Costner 5, Rolando Blackman 9, Thurl Bailey 14, Richard Rellford 4.

- 4th All-Star Game 1995–96:

DATE: January 6, 1996 (I)
VENUE: OAKA
SCORE: USA - Europe 124–113

TEAM EUROPE: (Coach: Lefteris Subotić): Fragiskos Alvertis 16, Georgios Sigalas 20, Panagiotis Giannakis 2, Bane Prelević 7, Nikos Oikonomou 27, Angelos Koronios 7, Stojan Vranković 9, Dinos Angelidis 6, Lefteris Kakiousis 2, Efthimis Rentzias 14, Georgios Karagkoutis 3.

TEAM USA: (Coach: Dragan Šakota): Byron Dinkins 20, Melvin Cheatum 4, Xavier McDaniel 12, Buck Johnson 2, Richard Rellford 21, Lucius Davis 8, Mitchell Wiggins 12, Priest Lauderdale 1, Dominique Wilkins 19, Dean Garrett 12, José Ortiz 5, Lawrence Funderburke 4, Anthony Pelle 2.

- 5th All-Star Game 1996–97:

DATE: 14 December 1996 (II)
VENUE: Alexandreio Melathron
SCORE: Europe - USA 83–75

TEAM EUROPE: (Coaches: Giannis Ioannidis / Vangelis Alexandris): Angelos Koronios, Jure Zdovc 5, Panagiotis Liadelis 2, Nikos Chatzis 1, Georgios Sigalas 13, Peja Stojaković 20, Fragiskos Alvertis 9, Nikos Oikonomou 12, Dinos Angelidis, Panos Fasoulas 12, Efthimis Rentzias 4, Giannis Giannoulis, Dimitris Papanikolaou 4, Lefteris Kakiousis 1.

TEAM USA: (Coaches: Kostas Missas / Kostas Petropoulos): Alphonso Ford 7, Harold Ellis 11, Byron Dinkins 6, "Dollar "Bill" Edwards, Marlon Maxey 8, Victor Alexander 6, Anthony Bonner 4, Keith Gatlin 4, Andrés Guibert 4, Melvin Cheatum 5, Eric Riley 2, John Hudson.

- 6th All-Star Game 1997–98:

DATE: November 22, 1997
VENUE: EAK Patras
SCORE: Europe - USA 127–108

TEAM EUROPE: (Coach: Giannis Ioannidis): Dragan Tarlać 2, Artūras Karnišovas 32, Nikos Vetoulas, Peja Stojaković 30, Dinos Angelidis 6, Nasos Galakteros 2, Angelos Koronios, Fragiskos Alvertis 12, Alexis Papadatos, Giannis Giannoulis 3, Nikos Chatzis 22, Dušan Vukčević 9, Panagiotis Liadelis (DNP)

TEAM USA: (Coach: Kostas Diamantopoulos): Willie Anderson 5, Samir Gouda 4, Scotty Thurman 8, José Ortiz 9, Byron Scott 29, Michael Hawkins 3, Frankie King 7, Conner Henry 3, Marlon Maxey 17, Brooks Thompson 17, Dyron Nix 3, Antonio Harvey 8.

- 7th All-Star Game 1998–99:

DATE: November 21, 1998
VENUE: OAKA
SCORE: Europe - USA 124–114

TEAM EUROPE: (Coaches: Soulis Markopoulos / Kostas Petropoulos): Fragiskos Alvertis 8, Nikos Chatzis 14, Arijan Komazec 20, Dimitris Papanikolaou 13, Georgios Sigalas 9, Georgios Balogiannis 4, Dejan Bodiroga 9, Nikos Oikonomou 9, Dragan Tarlać 11, Claudio Coldebella 12, Anatoly Zourpenko 2, Mikhail Mikhailov 13.

TEAM USA (Coaches: Zvi Sherf / Argyris Pedoulakis): Andy Toolson 13, Anthony Goldwire 26, Shane Heal 13, Derrick Dial 6, Joe Arlauckas 12, Buck Johnson, Alphonso Ford 4, Frankie King 3, Antonio Harvey 4, Mikki Moore 9, Erik Meek 8, Alvin Sims 17.

- 8th All-Star Game 1999–00:

DATE: November 20, 1999
VENUE: OAKA
SCORE: Europe - USA 119–118

TEAM EUROPE: (Coaches: Giannis Ioannidis / Georgios Zevgolis): Angelos Koronios, Oded Kattash 26, Nikos Chatzis 6, Dimitris Papanikolaou 11, Panagiotis Liadelis 16, Claudio Coldebella 1, Dejan Bodiroga 19, Johnny Rogers 7, Giannis Giannoulis 13, Dimos Dikoudis 9, Michalis Kakiouzis 10.

TEAM USA: (Coaches: Dragan Šakota / Andrea Mazzon): Shane Heal 2, Anthony Bowie 19, Henry Turner 6, Byron Dinkins 9, James Robinson 9, Alphonso Ford 1, Ashraf Amaya 12, Khalid Reeves 10, "Dollar Bill" Edwards 27, James Forrest 19, Andrés Guibert 6, Buck Johnson.

- 9th All-Star Game 2000–01:

DATE: January 20, 2001
VENUE: EAK Patras
SCORE: Greece - World 86–85

TEAM GREECE: (Coaches: Argyris Pedoulakis / Kostas Flevarakis): Fragiskos Alvertis 17, Georgios Kalaitzis 2, Thodoris Papaloukas 10, Dimitris Papanikolaou 13, Georgios Sigalas 3, Georgios Diamantopoulos 6, Dimos Dikoudis 11, Kostas Tsartsaris 5, Lazaros Papadopoulos 9, Christos Tapoutos 6, Nikos Chatzivrettas 2, Michalis Pelekanos (DNP)

WORLD TEAM: (Coaches: Ilias Zouros / Georgios Zevgolis): Vrbica Stefanov 5, Buck Johnson 14, İbrahim Kutluay 1, Stéphane Risacher 10, Byron Dinkins 7, Jimmy Oliver 9, Dušan Vukčević 17, Ashraf Amaya 10, Anatoly Zourpenko, Vladimir Petrović-Stergiou 3, Harper Williams 9.

- 10th All-Star Game 2001–02:

DATE: February 16, 2002
SCORE: World - Greece 126–125
VENUE: Dimitris Krachtidis Indoor Hall

TEAM GREECE: (Coaches: Panagiotis Giannakis / Nikos Pavlou): Christos Charissis 17, Kostas Sdrakas 2, Thodoris Papaloukas 2, Dimitris Papanikolaou 7, Georgios Sigalas 5, Nikos Chatzivrettas 11, Georgios Diamantopoulos 4, Kostas Tsartsaris 2, Dimos Dikoudis 18, Fragiskos Alvertis 16, Lazaros Papadopoulos 17, Michalis Kakiouzis 21, Dimitris Diamantidis 3.

WORLD TEAM: (Coaches: Željko Obradović, Dragan Šakota): Laurent Sciarra 3, İbrahim Kutluay 16, Dejan Bodiroga 11, Jimmy Oliver 3, J.R. Holden 22, Chris Carr 10, Alphonso Ford 8, Torraye Braggs 24, Norman Nolan 21, Ryan Lorthridge 8.

- 11th All-Star Game 2002–03:

DATE: March 30, 2003
SCORE: Greece - World 115–110
VENUE: Kanithou Indoor Hall

TEAM GREECE: (Coaches: Panagiotis Giannakis / Vangelis Alexandris): Christos Charissis 10, Georgios Kalaitzis, Dimitris Diamantidis 7, Dimitris Papanikolaou, Nikos Oikonomou 11, Fragiskos Alvertis 8, Georgios Diamantopoulos 26, Dimos Dikoudis 15, Nestoras Kommatos 5, Lazaros Papadopoulos 2, Michalis Pelekanos 2, Antonis Fotsis 29.

WORLD TEAM: (Coaches: Bane Prelević / Argyris Pedoulakis): Doremus Bennerman 6, Larry Ayuso 13, Jaka Lakovič, Iñaki de Miguel 8, İbrahim Kutluay 17, Mo Evans 13, Tyrone Nesby 22, Kenyon Jones 4, Ryan Stack, Teoman Alibegović 10, Ben Handlogten 8, Andy Betts 9.

- 12th All-Star Game 2003–04:

DATE: March 28, 2004
SCORE: Greece - World 102–89
VENUE: Nea Ionia Indoor Hall

TEAM GREECE: (Coaches: Panagiotis Giannakis / Lefteris Kakiousis): Georgios Kalaitzis 7, Nikos Chatzivrettas 8, Christos Tapoutos 2, Nestoras Kommatos 22, Nikos Chatzis 6, Panagiotis Liadelis 8, Dimitris Diamantidis 9, Kostas Tsartsaris, Giannis Giannoulis 12, Lazaros Papadopoulos 14, Andreas Glyniadakis 2, Fragiskos Alvertis, Nikos Zisis (DNP).

WORLD TEAM: (Coaches: Bane Prelević, Charles Burton): Damir Mulaomerović 15, Roderick Blakney 8, Horace Jenkins, Toby Bailey 6, Jamel Thomas 3, Ryan Stack 4, Smush Parker 8, Ruben Douglas 12, Pete Mickeal 13, Ira Clark 4, Dalibor Bagarić 8, Travis Watson 8, Kasib Powell.

- 13th All-Star Game 2004–05:

DATE: April 10, 2005
SCORE: Greece - World 77–76
VENUE: EAK Patras

TEAM GREECE: (Coaches: Panagiotis Giannakis / Fotis Katsikaris): Nikos Zisis 2, Vassilis Spanoulis 6, Christos Charissis, Kostas Vasileiadis 8, Dimitris Diamantidis 2, Nikos Chatzis 5, Nikos Barlos 18, Nikos Oikonomou 5, Kostas Tsartsaris 9, Panos Vasilopoulos 12, Fragiskos Alvertis 3, Sofoklis Schortsanitis.

WORLD TEAM: (Coaches: Željko Obradović / Bane Prelević): Damir Mulaomerović 6, Jaka Lakovič, Ibrahim Kutluay, DeJuan Collins 14, Gary Trent 4, Travis Watson 13, Sandro Nicević 3, Toby Bailey 8, Ryan Stack 3, Andre Hutson 6, Pete Mickeal 11, Mike Batiste 8.

- 14th All-Star Game 2005–06:

DATE: February 26, 2006
SCORE: Greece - World 97–97
VENUE: Neapolis Indoor Hall

TEAM GREECE: (Coaches: Željko Obradović / Vangelis Alexandris): Ioannis Gagaloudis 9, Vassilis Spanoulis 9, Dimitris Papanikolaou 20, Kostas Vasileiadis 9, Loukas Mavrokefalidis, Fragiskos Alvertis 3, Nikos Oikonomou 4, Kostas Tsartsaris 4, Dimitris Diamantidis 5, Ioannis Bourousis 8, Sofoklis Schortsanitis 20.

WORLD TEAM: (Coaches: Jonas Kazlauskas / Argyris Pedoulakis): Damir Mulaomerović 17, Tyus Edney 4, Jaka Lakovič 3, Larry Stewart 4, Quincy Lewis 10, Mike Batiste 9, Andrija Žižić 2, Nikolay Padius 11, Terrel Castle 12, Ryan Stack 9, Bryan Bracey 16.

- 15th All-Star Game 2006–07:

DATE: Feb. 4, 2007
SCORE: World - Greece 99–87
VENUE: Lamia Indoor Hall

TEAM GREECE: (Coaches: Željko Obradović / Kostas Pilafidis): Fragiskos Alvertis, Dimitris Diamantidis 18, Manos Papamakarios 3, Stratos Perperoglou 8, Georgios Printezis 7, Ioannis Bourousis 10, Savvas Iliadis 9, Dimos Dikoudis 8, Kostas Tsartsaris 4, Panos Vasilopoulos 2, Giannis Kalampokis 8, Sofoklis Schortsanitis 10.

WORLD TEAM: (Coaches: Pini Gershon / Andrea Mazzon): Smush Parker 7, Skills 4, Alex Acker 10, Sani Bečirovič 13, Ramunas Siskauskas 8, Jeremiah Massey 8, Clark 9, Walsh 10, Wilkinson 2, Kennedy Winston 6, Ryan Stack 6, Andre Hutson 16.

- 16th All-Star Game 2007–08:

DATE: 12 April 2008
SCORE: World - Greece 111–101
VENUE: Amaliada Ilida Indoor Hall

TEAM GREECE: (Coaches: Panagiotis Giannakis / Thanasis Skourtopoulos): Georgios Printezis 3, Dimitris Verginis 6, Vassilis Spanoulis 14, Stratos Perperoglou 6, Panos Vasilopoulos 10, Dimitris Diamantidis 13, Dimitris Tsaldaris 8, Dimos Dikoudis 9, Kostas Tsartsaris 8, Georgios Tsiaras 2, Ioannis Bourousis 18, Giannis Giannoulis 4.

WORLD TEAM: (Coaches: Željko Obradović / Gordie Herbert): Anthony Grundy 5, Mike Batiste 4, Wright 3, Klimavicius 9, Jeremiah Massey, 19 Jeremy Gisev 7, Brad Newley 2, Kennedy Winston 9, Qyntel Woods 28, C 14.

- 17th All-Star Game 2008–09:

DATE: March 15, 2009
SCORE: Greece - World 127–93
VENUE: Filippos Amoridis Indoor Hall

TEAM GREECE: (Coaches: Panagiotis Giannakis / Ioannis Sfairopoulos): Thodoris Papaloukas 18, Antonis Fotsis 11, Ioannis Bourousis 23, Panos Vasilopoulos 11, Stratos Perperoglou 6, Dimitris Tsaldaris 2, Kostas Papanikolaou 2, Vassilis Spanoulis 11, Loukas Mavrokefalidis 12, Dimitris Diamantidis 14, Andreas Glyniadakis 14.

WORLD TEAM: (Coaches: Željko Obradović / Andrea Mazzon): Sarunas Jasikevicius 3, Anthony Grundy 2, Mike Batiste 17, Nikola Peković 8, Bryant 8, Bryant M, K, Nikolas 7, Nikola Vujčić 10, Lynn Greer 9, Jannero Pargo 5.

- 18th All-Star Game 2009–10:

DATE: March 14, 2010
SCORE: Greece - World 147–114
VENUE: Heraklion Indoor Arena

TEAM GREECE: (Coaches: Georgios Bartzokas / Ilias Zouros): Makis Nikolaidis 13, Sofoklis Schortsanitis 42, Lazaros Papadopoulos 8, Thodoris Papaloukas 13, Kostas Kaimakoglou 13, Antonis Fotsis 10, Ian Vougioukas 9, Manos Papamakarios 15, Kostas Charalampidis 8, Giannis Kalampokis, Michalis Pelekanos 16, Vassilis Spanoulis (DNP).

WORLD TEAM: (Coaches: David Blatt / Nenad Marković): Harris 2, Nikola Peković, Zoran Erceg 6, Francis 15, Miloš Teodosić 7, Drew Nicholas 16, Josh Childress 8, Linas Kleiza, Mike Batiste 17, Marcus Haislip 4, Jamon Gordon 13, Miles, Gregor 10

- 19th All-Star Game 2010–11:

DATE: March 13, 2011
SCORE: Greece - World 141–122
VENUE: Pyrgos Indoor Hall

TEAM GREECE: (Coaches: Vangelis Alexandris / Ioannis Sfairopoulos): Ian Vougioukas 6, Pat Calathes 24, Loukas Mavrokefalidis 22, Dimitris Diamantidis 13, Vassilis Spanoulis 8, Nick Calathes 11, Kostas Kaimakoglou 4, Antonis Fotsis 18, Makis Nikolaidis 11, Kostas Charissis 15, Stratos Perperoglou 4, Nikos Barlos 5, Thodoris Papaloukas (DNP).

WORLD TEAM: (Coaches: Željko Obradović / Dimitris Priftis): Smith 13, Zoran Erceg 4, Rasho Nesterović 6, Miloš Teodosić 7, Palace 3, Mike Batiste 14, Lonny Baxter 20, Cedric Simmons 4, Marshall 11, Thompson 12.

- 20th All-Star Game 2012–13:

DATE: March 10, 2013
SCORE: World - Greece 131–125
VENUE: Perivola Indoor Hall

TEAM GREECE: (Coaches: Argyris Pedoulakis / Soulis Markopoulos): Kostas Charalampidis 2, Vlado Janković 4, Mike Bramos, Nikos Pappas 10, Kostas Sloukas 2, Kostas Papanikolaou 15, Lazaros Papadopoulos 24, Dimitris Diamantidis 6, Georgios Printezis 11, Vassilis Spanoulis 7, Michalis Tsairelis 4, Giannis Antetokounmpo* 8, Thanasis Antetokounmpo* 18, Sofoklis Schortsanitis (DNP).

WORLD TEAM: (Coaches: Georgios Bartzokas / Ioannis Sfairopoulos): Terrell Stoglin 12, Hunt 9, Errick McCollum 13, Jonas Mačiulis, Landon Milbourne 10, Roko Ukić 18, Acie Law 6, Stephane Lasme 4, Grant 6, James Gist 12, Brent Petway 26, Kyle Hines.

- Giannis Antetokounmpo and Thanasis Antetokounmpo were not voted onto the 2013 Greek League All-Star Game by the fans, nor were they selected to the game by the league's head coaches. However, Giannis' older brother, Thanasis, did compete in the 2013 Greek League Slam Dunk Contest, which took place at the same venue, and on the same day as, the league's All-Star Game. Giannis Antetokounmpo was also at the All-Star event, as he was assisting his older brother Thanasis, with some of his slam dunk contest dunk attempts. Since both of the Antetokounmpo brothers were already in attendance at the event, the All-Star Game's head coaches decided to allow them to both play in the All-Star Game, as a treat for the fans that were in attendance. However, despite the fact that both Antetokounmpo brothers played in the All-Star Game, they were not actually credited with being league All-Stars. At the time, neither of them played in Greece's First Division Greek Basket League, and instead both played in Greece's Second Division Greek A2 Basket League. The HEBA Greek All-Star Game is the all-star game of Greece's first division league, and therefore only players that play in the first division league are eligible to be all-star players of the league.

- 21st All-Star Game 2013–14:

DATE: March 10, 2014
SCORE: Greece - World 123–122
VENUE: Chania Indoor Hall

TEAM GREECE: (Coaches: Soulis Markopoulos / Georgios Kalafatakis): Vangelis Mantzaris, Nikos Pappas 24, Mike Bramos 18, Ioannis Athinaiou 17, Stratos Perperoglou, Antonis Fotsis 7, Georgios Printezis, Loukas Mavrokefalidis 15, Dimitris Diamantidis 5, Michalis Tsairelis 12, Vassilis Kavvadas 8, Georgios Bogris 17, Vassilis Spanoulis (DNP).
WORLD TEAM: (Coaches: Georgios Bartzokas / Ioannis Sfairopoulos): Errick McCollum 14, Brown 11, Ewin 16, D.J. Cooper 6, Jonas Maciulis 12, Matt Lojeski 13, Ivan Aska 2, Bryant Dunston 2, Stephane Lasme 17, James Gist 2, D.J. Stephens 19, Jason Hart 18.

- 22nd All-Star Game 2017–18:

DATE: February 11, 2018
SCORE: World - Greece 144–137
VENUE: EAK Patras

TEAM GREECE: (Coaches: Xavi Pascual / Ilias Papatheodorou): Nick Calathes 11, Vassilis Spanoulis 12, Georgios Printezis 14, Nikos Pappas 17, Vassilis Kavvadas 8, Thanasis Antetokounmpo 22, Nikos Gkikas 9, Lefteris Bochoridis 15, Kostas Papanikolaou 8, Antonis Koniaris 6, Vangelis Margaritis 13, Ian Vougioukas 2, Panos Vasilopoulos (DNP).
WORLD: (Coaches: Ioannis Sfairopoulos / Panagiotis Giannakis): Jason Hart 21, Moore 25, Chris Singleton 8, Milan Milošević 11, Nikola Milutinov 6, Thad McFadden 16, Langston Hall 9, Janis Strelnieks 6, K.C. Rivers 12, James Gist 12, Jamel McLean.

- 23rd All-Star Game 2018–19:

DATE: February 10, 2019
SCORE: World - Greece 149–146
VENUE: Alexandreio Melathron

GREECE: (Coaches: Rick Pitino / Argyris Pedoulakis): Nick Calathes, Vassilis Spanoulis 3, Linos Chrysikopoulos 4, Lefteris Bochoridis 16, Giannoulis Larentzakis 10, Georgios Printezis 7, Thanasis Antetokounmpo 39, Kostas Papanikolaou 17, Ioannis Papapetrou 15, Panos Vasilopoulos 4, Georgios Bogris 12, Georgios Papagiannis 22.
WORLD: (Coaches: David Blatt / Luca Banchi ): Nigel Williams-Goss 10, Sean Kilpatrick 17, Janis Strelnieks 23, Axel Toupane 16, Jonas Maciulis 6, Nikola Milutinov 2, Danny Agbelese 12, William Hatcher 5, Jordan 12

- 24th All-Star Game 2019–20:

DATE: February 9, 2020
SCORE: Team Maciulis - Team Calathes 109–104
VENUE: Heraklion Indoor Arena

TEAM CALATHES: (Coaches: Ilias Papatheodorou / Sotiris Manolopoulos): Conner Frankamp 9, Ras 12, Tomas 15, Nick Calathes 6, Vassilis Kavvadas 8, Dimitris Katsivelis 2, Nikos Pappas 5, Vangelis Mantzaris 6, K. Brown 3, Filler 14, Stephen Gray 2, Panos Filippakos 6, Jacob Wiley 4, Samardo Samuels 12, Sofoklis Schortsanitis.
TEAM MACIULIS: (Coaches: Makis Giatras / Vangelis Ziagkos): Jimmer Fredette 9, Tyrese Rice 6, Jonas Maciulis 11, Danny Agbelese 6, Dinos Mitoglou 19, Kostas Papadakis, Bobby Brown 6, Olivier Hanlan 12, Charis Giannopoulos 6, Lefteris Bochoridis 10, Vangelis Karampoulas 9, Marcus Slaughter 4, Loukas Mavrokefalidis 2, Georgios Papagiannis 9.

- 25th All-Star Game 2022–23:

DATE: December 18, 2022
SCORE: Team Vezenkov - Team Papagiannis 137–112
VENUE: OAKA

TEAM VEZENKOV: (Coaches: Georgios Bartzokas / Ioannis Kastritis): Vassilis Toliopoulos 3, Nikos Gkikas 18, Thomas Walkup 8, Nate Wolters 6, Yannick Franke 4, Omer Netzipoglou 6, Dimitris Agravanis 20, Sasha Vezenkov 18, Akil Mitchell 19, Moustapha Fall 21, Charis Giannopoulos 12, Paris Lee 0.

TEAM PAPAGIANNIS: (Coaches: Vassilis Spanoulis / Dejan Radonjić): Kostas Sloukas 0, Marcus Denmon 11, Giannoulis Larentzakis 12, JD Notae 24, Kostas Papanikolaou 5, Dwayne Bacon 12, Derrick Williams 6, Panos Kalaitzakis 0, Loukas Mavrokefalidis 5, Arnoldas Kulboka 14, Cameron McGriff 2, Georgios Papagiannis 21.

- 26th All-Star Game 2023–24:

DATE: December 17, 2023
SCORE: Team Walkup - Team Sloukas 177–165
VENUE: Karditsa Indoor Arena

TEAM WALKUP: (Coaches: Georgios Bartzokas / Ilias Papatheodorou): Thomas Walkup 7 , Isaiah Canaan 27, Panos Kalaitzakis 9, Mindaugas Kuzminskas 13, Nate Renfro 16, Kostas Papadakis 11, Omer Netzipoglou 17, Leonidas Kaselakis 8, Chris Coffey 14, Kris Bankston 10, Georgios Bogris 20, Luka Brajkovic 25.

TEAM SLOUKAS: (Coaches: Vassilis Spanoulis / Ergin Ataman): Luca Vildoza 3, Giannoulis Larentzakis 23, Kostas Sloukas 5, Kostas Papanikolaou 9, Mfiondu Kabengele 28, Vassilis Toliopoulos 15, Andrew Goudelock 21, Kostas Antetokounmpo 16, Neo Avdalas 12, Michalis Tsairelis 0, Roberto Gallinat 33, Jordan McRae 0.

== All-Star Game events ==
=== Slam Dunk Contest Champions ===
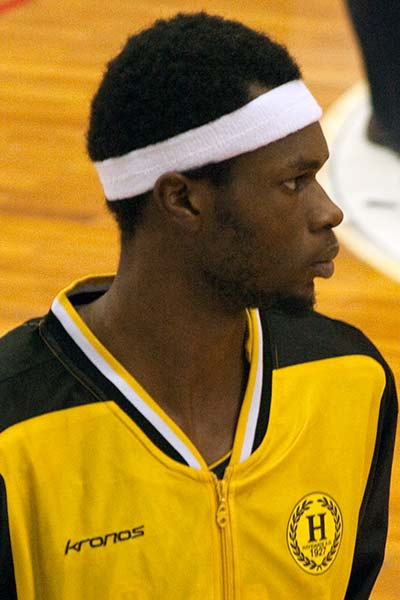
Brent Petway, winner of the slam dunk contest in 2013.

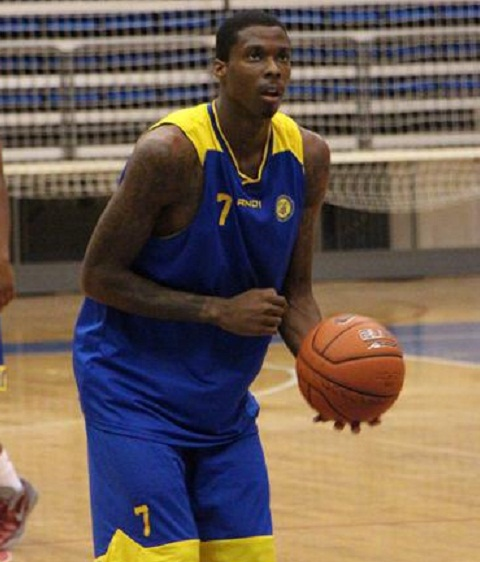
Kenny Gabriel, winner of the slam dunk contest in 2014.

Year Held (Season)	Slam Dunk Champion	Team
1991; 1991–92	(United States) John Hudson	Panionios
1992-93		Not held
1994 (I); 1993–94	(United States) Henry Turner	Panionios
1994 (II); 1994–95	(United States) Chris King	Aris
1996 (I); 1995–96	(United States) Lawrence Funderburke	PAOK
1996 (II); 1996–97	(United States) Harold Ellis	Apollon Patras
1997; 1997–98	(United States) Antonio Harvey	Panionios
1998; 1998–99	(United States) Antonio Harvey (2×)	Irakleio
1999; 1999–00	(United States) Henry Turner (2×)	Maroussi
2001; 2000–01	(Greece) Dimitris Papanikolaou	Olympiacos
2002; 2001–02	(United States) Ryan Lorthridge	KAOD
2003; 2002–03	(United States) Tyrone Nesby	Olympia Larissa
2004; 2003–04	(United States) Kasib Powell	PAOK
2005; 2004–05	(United States) Toby Bailey	AEK Athens
2006; 2005–06	(Greece) Michael Paragyios	Ilysiakos
2007; 2006–07	(Greece) Georgios Printezis	Olympia Larissa
2008; 2007–08	(United States) Qyntel Woods	Olympiacos
2009; 2008–09	(United States) Will Daniels	Kavala
2010; 2009–10	(United States) Lance Harris	Kolossos Rodou
2011; 2010–11	(United States) Lance Harris (2×)	Ikaros Kallitheas
2012; 2011–12	Not held	
2013; 2012–13	(United States) Brent Petway	Rethymno
2014; 2013–14	(United States) Kenny Gabriel	Rethymno
2015; 2014–15	Not held	
2016; 2015–16	Not held	
2017; 2016–17	Not held	
2018; 2017–18	(United States) Stefan Moody	Rethymno
2019; 2018–19	(United States) Octavius Ellis	Promitheas
2020; 2019–20	(Greece) Georgios Papagiannis	Panathinaikos
2020–21	Not Held	Not Held
2021–22	Not Held	Not Held
2022; 2022–23	(United States) Chevez Goodwin	Aris
2023; 2023–24	(United States) Nate Renfro	Peristeri

=== 3-Point Shootout Contest Champions ===
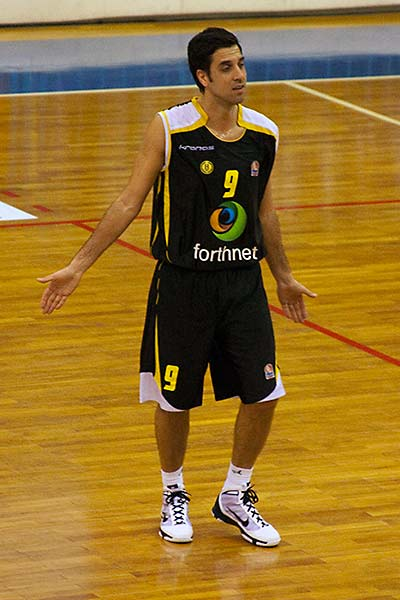
Nikos Chatzis, two-time winner of the 3-point contest (1999, 2003).

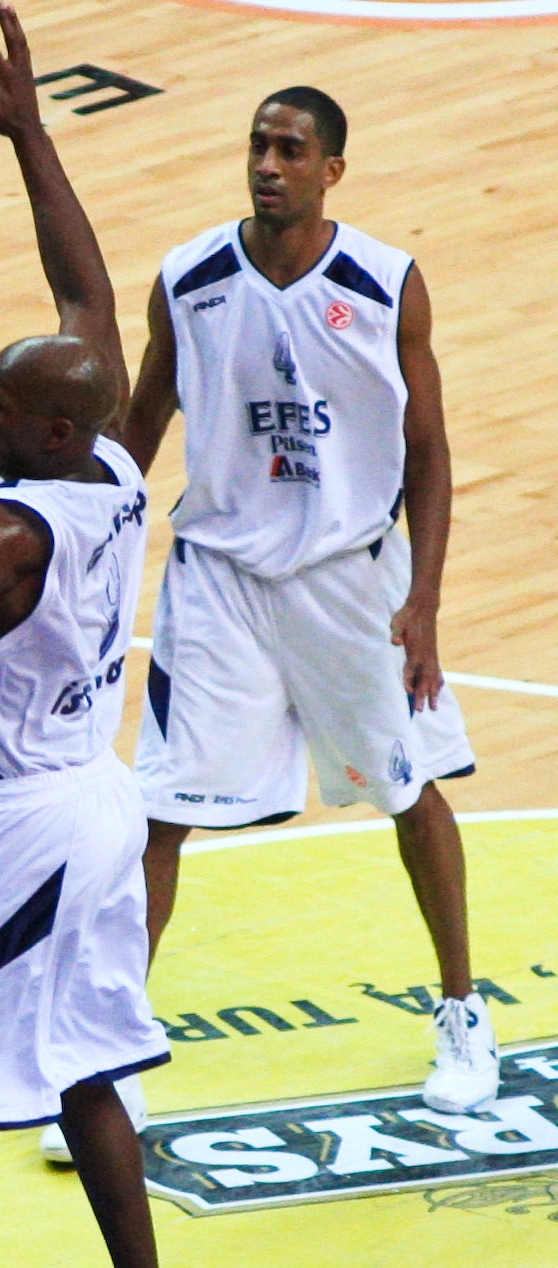
Drew Nicholas, two-time winner of the 3-point contest (2010, 2011).

Year Held (Season)	3 Point Shootout Champion	Team
1991; 1991–92	(Greece) Ioannis Giannopoulos	Pagrati
1992–93	Not Held	Not Held
1994 (I); 1993–94	(Greece) Dimitris Podaras	AEK Athens
1994 (II); 1994–95	(United States) Travis Mays	Panionios
1996 (I); 1995–96	(Greece) Fragiskos Alvertis	Panathinaikos
1996 (II); 1996–97	(Greece) Fragiskos Alvertis (2×)	Panathinaikos
1997; 1997–98	(Greece) Fragiskos Alvertis (3×)	Panathinaikos
1998; 1998–99	(United States) Andy Toolson	Maroussi
1999; 1999–00	(Greece) Nikos Chatzis	AEK Athens
2001; 2000–01	(Greece) Ioannis Kritikos	Peristeri
2002; 2001–02	(Turkey) İbrahim Kutluay	Panathinaikos
2003; 2002–03	(Greece) Nikos Chatzis (2×)	AEK Athens
2004; 2003–04	(Greece) Angelos Koronios	Panionios
2005; 2004–05	(Greece) Dimitris Tsarouchas	Ilysiakos
2006; 2005–06	(Greece) Fotis Vasilopoulos	Panionios
2007; 2006–07	(Slovenia) Sani Bečirovič	Panathinaikos
2008; 2007–08	(Greece) Makis Nikolaidis	Aigaleo
2009; 2008–09	(Greece) Dimitris Karadolamis	AEL
2010; 2009–10	(United States) Drew Nicholas	Panathinaikos
2011; 2010–11	(United States) Drew Nicholas (2×)	Panathinaikos
2012; 2011–12	Not Held	Not Held
2013; 2012–13	(Greece) Georgios Dedas	PAOK
2014; 2013–14	(Bosnia and Herzegovina) Saša Vasiljević	Nea Kifissia
2014–15	Not Held	Not Held
2015–16	Not Held	Not Held
2016–17	Not Held	Not Held
2018; 2017–18	(Greece) Antonis Koniaris	PAOK
2019; 2018–19	(United States) Phil Goss	PAOK
2020; 2019–20	(United States) Bobby Brown	PAOK
2020–21	Not Held	Not Held
2021–22	Not Held	Not Held
2022; 2022–23	(United States) Marcus Denmon	Peristeri
2023; 2023–24	(Lithuania) Laurynas Beliauskas	PAOK

== HEBA Greek Youth All-Star Game ==
The HEBA Greek Hopes, or Youth All-Star Game of basketball, was the all-star game that was played by players from the Greek basketball leagues that were ages 20 and under. The first Hopes game was played on March 29, 2003. The Youth All-Star Game was played over the same all-star weekend as the regular Greek All-Star Game, and was played at the same arena as well.

The game was considered as analogous to the NBA's All-Star Weekend Rising Stars Challenge. There are also the Greek Youth 3 Point Shootout Competition and the Greek Youth Slam Dunk Contest, for Greek players that are ages 20 and under.

=== Youth Under-20 All-Star Game results ===
Season Date	Winners	Losers	Score	Arena	MVP Team
2002–03; 3–29–03	North	South	67–64	Kanithou	(Greece) Christos Tapoutos; AEK Athens
2003–04; 3–27–04	North	South	87–70	Nea Ionia	(Greece) Kostas Vasileiadis; PAOK
2004–05; 4–9–05	South	North	89–87	Tofalos	(Greece) Dimitris Charitopoulos; Aris
2005–06; 2–25–06	South	North	80–79	Larissa	(Greece) Georgios Printezis; Olympia Larissa
2006–07; 2–3–07	South	North	87–83	Lamia	(Greece) Dimitris Verginis; PAOK
2007–08; 4–11–08	South	North	93–69	Amaliada	(Greece) Dimitris Karadolamis; Aris
2008–09; 3–14–09	North	South	65–53	Amiridis	(Greece) Kostas Papanikolaou; Aris
2009–10; 3–13–10	Under 20s	Under 22s	91–89	Alikarnassou	(Greece) Michalis Tsairelis; Trikala 2000
2010–11; 3–13–11	Under 22s	Under 20s	69–68	Vassilakopoulos	(Greece) Linos Chrysikopoulos; Aris
2011–12; Not Held	Not Held	Not Held	Not Held	Not Held	Not Held
2012–13; 3–9–13	Under 21s	Under 18s	104–80	Perivola	(Greece) Lefteris Bochoridis; Aris
2013–14; 3–8–14	Young Stars	Rising Stars	82–77	Chania	(Greece) Ioannis Papapetrou; Olympiacos
2014–15 to 2023–24; Not Held	Not Held	Not Held	Not Held	Not Held	Not Held

=== Youth Under-22 3 Point Shootout Contest Champions ===
Season	3 Point Shootout Champion	Team
2002–03	(Greece) Panagiotis Katranas	Olympiacos
2003–04	(Greece) Sotiris Manolopoulos	PAOK
2004–05	(Greece) Panagiotis Katranas	Olympiacos
2005–06	(Greece) / (Serbia) Dušan Šakota	Panathinaikos
2006–07	(Greece) Fotis Vasilopoulos	Panionios
2007–08	(Greece) / (Serbia) Vlado Janković	Panionios
2008–09	(Greece) Dimitris Karadolamis	AEL
2009–10	(Greece) Kostas Sloukas	Olympiacos
2010–11	(Greece) Kostas Sloukas	Aris
2011–12	Not Held	Not Held
2012–13	(Greece) Fotis Zoumpos	Peristeri
2013–14	(Greece) Panagiotis Zanidakis	Nea Kydonia
2014–15	Not Held	Not Held
2015–16	Not Held	Not Held
2016–17	Not Held	Not Held
2017–18	(Greece) Antonis Koniaris	PAOK
2018–19	(Greece) Dimitris Flionis	Aris
2019–20	(Greece) Kostas Papadakis	Panathinaikos
2020–21 to 2023–24; Not Held	Not Held	Not Held

=== Youth Under-22 Slam Dunk Contest Champions ===
Season	Slam Dunk Champion	Team
2012–13	(Greece) Vassilis Kavvadas	Panionios
2013–14	(Greece) Vassilis Charalampopoulos	Panathinaikos
2014–15	Not Held	Not Held
2015–16	Not Held	Not Held
2016–17	Not Held	Not Held
2017–18	(Greece) Georgios Tsalmpouris	Kolossos Rodou
2018–19	(Greece) Ioannis Agravanis	Peristeri
2019–20	(Greece) Lefteris Mantzoukas	Promitheas Patras
2020–21 to 2023–24; Not Held	Not Held	Not Held

== Rising Stars versus All-Time Stars ==
The Rising Stars versus the All-Time Stars, is the all-star game that is played between players from the Greek basketball leagues that are ages 22 and under, and retired former professional Greek players. The first game was played on February 10, 2018. The game is played over the same all-star weekend as the regular Greek All-Star Game, and is played at the same arena as well.

=== Rising Stars versus All-Time Stars results ===
Season Date	Winners	Losers	Score	Arena	Location	MVP Team
2017–18; 2–10–18	All-Time Stars	Rising Stars	108–92	Dimitris Tofalos Arena	Patras	(Greece) Thodoris Papaloukas retired
2018–19; 2–9–19	Rising Stars	All-Time Stars	120–115	Alexandrio Melathron	Thessaloniki	(Greece) Dimitris Flionis
2019–20; 2–8–20	Rising Stars	All-Time Stars	103–90	Heraklion Sports Arena	Heraklion	(Greece) Nikos Rogkavopoulos
2020–21 to 2023–24; Not Held	Not Held	Not Held	Not Held	Not Held	Not Held	Not Held

== Players with most All-Star appearances (1991–2023) ==
Player	All-Star Appearances	Years	MVP	Notes
(Greece) Fragiskos Alvertis	12×	(1994 (II), 1996 (I), 1996 (II), 1997, 1998, 2001–2007)	(2001)	3× Greek All-Star Game Three-Point Contest Champion (1996 I, 1996 II, 1997)
(Greece) Dimitris Diamantidis	11×	(2002–2009, 2011, 2013, 2014)	-	FIBA EuroStar (2007)
(Greece) Vassilis Spanoulis	10×	(2005, 2006, 2008–2011, 2013, 2014, 2018, 2019)	-	FIBA EuroStar (2007)
(Greece) Georgios Sigalas	7×	(1994 (I), 1994 (II), 1996 (I), 1996 (II), 1998, 2001, 2002)	-	FIBA European Selection (1995); FIBA EuroStar (1996)
(Greece) Dimitris Papanikolaou	7×	(1996 (II), 1998, 1999, 2001, 2002, 2003, 2006)	-	Greek All-Star Game Slam-Dunk Contest Champion (2001)
(Greece) Kostas Tsartsaris	7×	(2001, 2002, 2004–2008)	-	FIBA EuroStar (2007)
(Greece) Panos Vasilopoulos	7×	(2005–2009, 2018, 2019)	-	FIBA EuroStar (2007)
(Greece) Nikos Oikonomou	6×	(1996 (I), 1996 (II), 1998, 2003, 2005, 2006)	-	4x FIBA EuroStar (1996–1999)
(Greece) Nikos Chatzis	6×	(1996 (II), 1997, 1998, 1999, 2004, 2005)	-	2× Greek All-Star Game Three-Point Contest Champion (1999, 2003)
(Greece) Dimos Dikoudis	6×	(1999, 2001–2003, 2007, 2008)	-	FIBA EuroStar (2007)
(Greece) Lazaros Papadopoulos	6×	(2001–2004, 2010, 2013)	-	FIBA EuroStar (2007)
(Greece) Antonis Fotsis	6×	(2001, 2003, 2009, 2010, 2011, 2014)	(2011)	FIBA EuroStar (2007)
(United States) Mike Batiste	6×	(2005, 2006, 2008–2011)	-	
(Greece) Sofoklis Schortsanitis	6×	(2005, 2006, 2007, 2010, 2013, 2020)	(2006, 2010)	FIBA EuroStar (2007)
(Greece) Ioannis Bourousis	6×	(2006, 2007, 2008, 2009, 2010, 2011)	-	FIBA EuroStar (2007)
(Greece) Loukas Mavrokefalidis	6×	(2006, 2009, 2011, 2014, 2020, 2022)	-	
(Greece) Georgios Printezis	6×	(2007, 2008, 2013, 2014, 2018, 2019)	-	Greek All-Star Game Slam-Dunk Contest Champion (2007)
(Greece) Angelos Koronios	5×	(1994 (I), 1996 (I), 1996 (II), 1997, 1999)	-	Greek All-Star Game Three-Point Contest Champion (2004)
(Greece) Giannis Giannoulis	5×	(1996 II, 1997, 1999, 2004, 2008)	-	FIBA EuroChallenge All-Star (2005)
(Greece) Thodoris Papaloukas	5×	(2001, 2002, 2009, 2010, 2011)	-	FIBA EuroStar (2007)

== Distinctions ==
=== FIBA Hall of Fame ===
- (United States) (Greece) Nikos Galis
- (Greece) Panagiotis Giannakis
- (Greece) Panagiotis Fassoulas
- (Slovenia) Jure Zdovc
- (Socialist Federal Republic of Yugoslavia) (Greece) Peja Stojaković
- (Socialist Federal Republic of Yugoslavia) Dušan Ivković
- (Soviet Union) (Ukraine) Alexander Volkov
- (Puerto Rico) José Ortiz

=== Basketball Hall of Fame ===
- (United States) (Greece) Nikos Galis
- (Croatia) Dino Radja
- (United States) Dominique Wilkins

=== FIBA's 50 Greatest Players (1991) ===
- (United States) (Greece) Nikos Galis

=== ULEB Euroleague Hall of Fame ===
- (Greece) Dimitris Diamantidis
- (Lithuania) Šarūnas Jasikevičius
- (Greece) Theo Papaloukas
- (Greece) Vassilis Spanoulis
- (Lithuania) Ramūnas Šiškauskas
- (Croatia) Nikola Vujčić
- (Socialist Federal Republic of Yugoslavia) Dušan Ivković

=== Collegiate Basketball Hall of Fame ===
- (United States) Xavier McDaniel
- (United States) Dominique Wilkins
- (United States) (Panama) Rolando Blackman

== See also ==
- Cyprus Basketball All-Star Day
- Greek Basketball League
- Greek A2 Basketball League
- Greek Cup
- Greek Super Cup
- HEBA
