= Michalis Karlis =

Greek basketball player

Doxa Pyrrou Artas
- Position: Combo guard
- League: Greek C Basket League

Personal information
- Born: 8 January 2003 (age 23) Nea Alikarnassos, Heraklion
- Listed height: 6 ft 1 in (1.85 m)
- Listed weight: 186 lb (84 kg)

Career information
- Playing career: 2021–present

Career history
- 2021–2022: AEK Athens
- 2022–2023: Raiffeisen Dornbirn Lions
- 2023-2024: Anagennisi Arkalochoriou
- 2024-2025: Asteras Temenis
- 2025: N.O. Saronidas
- 2026: Doxa Pyrrou Artas

Michalis Karlis (Greek: Μιχάλης Καρλής; born 8 January 2003) is a Greek professional basketball player for the Doxa Pyrrou Artas of the National League 2 . He is a 1.86 m (6 ft 1 in) tall point guard.

== Awards and achievements ==
• 1st in Steals in Basketball Zweite Liga (2.5 per game)

• 1st scorer for his team Asteras Temenis for 2024–2025 season (16.1 ppg)

== Professional career ==
Karlis joined the youth programm of AEK Athens in 2018. On 18 August 2021 Karlis signed his first professional contract with AEK. In 7 league games, he averaged 0.9 points in under 4 minutes per contest.

On 25 September 2022 Michalis signed with Raiffeisen Dornbirn Lions. He averaged 11.9 points, 4.8 assists, 4.5 rebounds and 2.5 steals in 32 minutes per game.

Michalis Karlis signed with Anagennisi Arkalochoriou for the 2023–2024 season.

Next season, he decided to play for Asteras Temenis and finished the season with explosive numbers and leading role.

On 30 May 2025, Michalis Karlis signed for N.O. Saronidas.

Karlis moved to Doxa Pyrrou Artas on 1 December 2025.
