= Kostas Papadakis (basketball) =

Greek basketball player (born 1998)

Kostas Papadakis Κώστας Παπαδάκης
No. 23 – Peristeri
- Position: Shooting guard / point guard
- League: Greek Basketball League

Personal information
- Born: September 27, 1998 (age 28)
- Listed height: 6 ft 3 in (1.91 m)
- Listed weight: 185 lb (84 kg)

Career information
- NBA draft: 2020: undrafted
- Playing career: 2015–present

Career history
- 2015–2021: Panathinaikos
- 2016–2019: →Kolossos Rodou
- 2020–2021: →Larisa
- 2021–2022: Iraklis Thessaloniki
- 2022–2023: AEK Athens
- 2023: Lavrio
- 2023–2024: Kolossos Rodou
- 2024–2025: PAOK Thessaloniki
- 2025–present: Peristeri

Career highlights
- Greek League champion (2020); Greek Cup winner (2016); Greek All-Star (2023)

Konstantinos "Kostas" Papadakis (Greek: Κωνσταντίνος "Κώστας" Παπαδάκης; born September 27, 1998) is a Greek professional basketball player for Peristeri of the Greek Basketball League. He is a 1.91 m (6 ft 3 in) tall combo guard.

== Professional career ==
Papadakis began his club career with Panathinaikos, in 2015. He was loaned to Kolossos, prior to the 2016–17 Greek Basket League season. He spent three seasons there, appearing in 22, 24 and 35 games, respectively, and averaging around 2.4 points per game.

On August 11, 2020, Papadakis was once again loaned to Larisa. With Larisa, Papadakis averaged 6.5 points, 1.9 rebounds, and 2.3 assists, playing 17.3 minutes per contest.

Papadakis spent the 2021-22 campaign with Iraklis and in 23 games, he averaged 7 points, 2.3 rebounds and 3.3 assists, shooting 33% from the 3-point line and playing around 23 minutes per contest.

On August 26, 2022, Papadakis signed a one-year contract with AEK Athens. In 23 league games, he averaged 3 points, 1 rebound and 0.6 assists in 9 minutes per contest.

On August 1, 2023, Papadakis signed with Lavrio. On December 11, 2023, he returned to Kolossos Rodou in an unofficial trade for Costis Gontikas.

On June 25, 2024, Papadakis moved back to Thessaloniki for PAOK.

On July 11, 2025, Papadakis signed with Peristeri.

== National team career ==
As a member of the junior national team of Greece, Papadakis played at the 2016 FIBA Europe Under-18 Championship.

== Awards and accomplishments ==
- Greek League champion: 2020
- Greek Cup Winner: 2016
