= Nikos Barlos =

Greek professional basketball player

Nikos Barlos Νίκος Μπάρλος
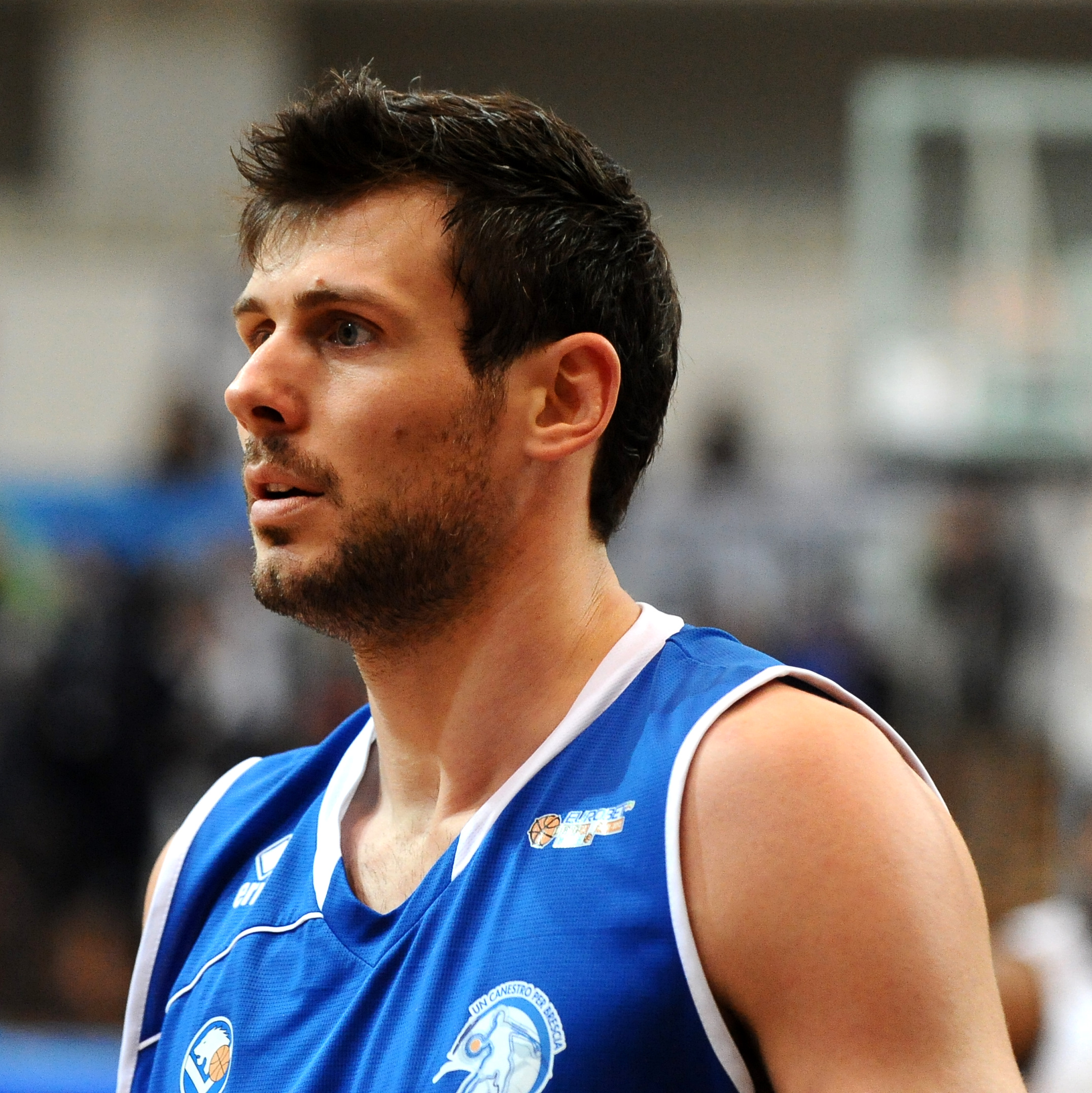
- Barlos with Brescia in 2013

Personal information
- Born: July 12, 1979 (age 47) Patras, Greece
- Listed height: 2.03 m (6 ft 8 in)
- Listed weight: 109 kg (240 lb)

Career information
- Playing career: 1998–2018
- Position: Small forward / Power forward

Career history

Playing
- 1998–2005: Apollon Patras
- 2005–2007: Olympiacos Piraeus
- 2007–2008: AEK Athens
- 2008–2010: Aris Thessaloniki
- 2010–2012: Panionios
- 2012–2013: Brescia
- 2013–2015: Nea Kifissia
- 2015–2016: Lavrio
- 2016–2017: Panionios
- 2017–2018: Kymis

Coaching
- 2018–present: Olympiacos (academies)
- 2019–2021: Olympiacos B (assistant)
- 2024: Maroussi (assistant)

Career highlights
- As player: 2× Greek 2nd Division champion (2003, 2017); 2× Greek League All-Star (2005, 2011); Greek All-Star Game MVP (2005)
Medals
Representing Greece
Men's basketball
Mediterranean Games
Silver medal – second place	2005 Almería	Under-26

Nikolaos "Nikos" Barlos (alternate spelling: Mparlos) (Greek: Νικόλαος "Νίκος" Μπάρλος; born July 12, 1979) is a Greek retired professional basketball player and coach. During his playing career, at a height of 2.03 m (6 ft 8 in) tall, he played at both the small forward and power forward positions.

== Professional playing career ==
Barlos won the Greek 2nd Division championship with Apollon Patras in 2003. He was named the MVP of the 2005 Greek All-Star Game. In the next season, he moved to Olympiacos, and with them he played in the EuroLeague. In 2015, he signed with Lavrio.

On November 12, 2017, Barlos joined Kymis of the top-tier level Greek Basket League.

== National team playing career ==
Barlos was a member of Greece's under-26 national selection that won the silver medal at the 2005 Mediterranean Games.

== Coaching career ==
After he retired from playing professional basketball, Barlos began his basketball coaching career in 2018, as he became a head coach of the Olympiacos youth academies. In 2019, he became the assistant coach of the reserve team of Olympiacos, Olympiacos B, of the Greek 2nd Division.

== Awards and accomplishments ==
=== Playing career ===
- 2× Greek 2nd Division Champion: (2003, 2017)
- 2× Greek League All-Star: (2005, 2011)
- Greek All-Star Game MVP: (2005)
