= Panagiotis Filippakos =

Greek basketball player

Keflavík
- Position: Power forward
- League: Úrvalsdeild karla

Personal information
- Born: April 9, 1994 (age 32) Maroussi, Greece
- Listed height: 6 ft 7.5 in (2.02 m)
- Listed weight: 225 lb (102 kg)

Career information
- Playing career: 2013–present

Career history
- 2013–2014: Psychiko
- 2014–2015: Koroivos Amaliadas
- 2015–2016: Panionios
- 2016–2017: Faros Keratsiniou
- 2017–2018: Papagou
- 2018–2019: Peristeri
- 2019–2020: Dafni Dafniou
- 2020–2021: Panerithraikos
- 2021–2022: AEK Athens
- 2022–2023: Apollon Patras
- 2023: Team Cali
- 2023: Apollon Patras
- 2023–2024: Maroussi
- 2024–2025: Mykonos
- 2025: Vikos Falcons
- 2025–2026: Dafni
- 2026–present: Keflavík

Career highlights
- Greek League All-Star (2020); Greek 2nd Division Top rebounder (2021)

Panagiotis "Panos" Filippakos (Greek: Παναγιώτης "Πάνος" Φιλλιπάκος; born April 9, 1994) is a Greek professional basketball player. He is a 2.02 m (6 ft 8 in) tall power forward.

== Professional career ==
On August 4, 2019, he signed with Panerithraikos of the Greek 2nd division. With Panerithraikos he was the Top Rebounder of the league that season.

On August 13, 2021, Filippakos signed a one-year contract with AEK Athens. In 24 league games, he averaged 3.6 points and 2.5 rebounds in under 10 minutes per contest. On July 1, 2022, Filippakos renewed his contract with AEK through 2024. On December 19 of the same year, he mutually parted ways with the club. In 6 league games, he averaged 2.5 points per contest.

On December 25, 2022, Filippakos signed with Apollon Patras for the rest of the season. In 12 league games, he averaged 5.6 points and 4.4 rebounds, playing around 17 minutes per contest. On April 22, 2023, Filippakos moved overseas to Colombian club Team Cali for the rest of the season.

On August 12, 2023, Filippakos returned to Apollon. On November 30, 2023, he left Apollon and joined Maroussi of the Greek Basket League.

On June 23, 2024, he joined Mykonos of the Greek A2 Elite League.
