= 2023 EuroLeague Playoffs =

European basketball postseason play

The 2023 EuroLeague Playoffs, known as the 2023 Turkish Airlines EuroLeague Playoffs for sponsorship purposes, were the first postseason portion of the 2022–23 EuroLeague basketball competition. They began on 25 April 2023 and were played through 10 May 2023. The top eight finishers in the regular season qualified for the playoffs, which consist of four series of two teams each, to be played in a best-of-five format. The winners of each of the playoffs series advanced to the Final Four, which determined the EuroLeague champion for the 2022–23 season.

== Qualified teams ==
Pos	Team	Pld	W	L	PF	PA	PD	Qualification
1	(Hellenic Basketball Federation) Olympiacos	34	24	10	2857	2578	+279	Higher seed in playoffs series
2	(Spanish Basketball Federation) Barcelona	34	23	11	2723	2580	+143	Higher seed in playoffs series
3	(Spanish Basketball Federation) Real Madrid	34	23	11	2877	2666	+211	Higher seed in playoffs series
4	(French Federation of Basketball) AS Monaco	34	21	13	2802	2749	+53	Higher seed in playoffs series
5	(Israeli Basketball Association) Maccabi Playtika Tel Aviv	34	20	14	2827	2743	+84	Lower seed in playoffs series
6	(Basketball Federation of Serbia) Partizan Mozzart Bet	34	20	14	2877	2781	+96	Lower seed in playoffs series
7	(Lithuanian Basketball Federation) Žalgiris	34	19	15	2591	2626	−35	Lower seed in playoffs series
8	(Turkish Basketball Federation) Fenerbahçe Beko	34	19	15	2823	2745	+78	Lower seed in playoffs series

Source: EuroLeague
Rules for classification: All points scored in extra period(s) were not counted in the standings, nor for any tie-break situation.

=== Tiebreakers ===
When more than two teams are tied, the ranking will be established taking into account the victories obtained in the games played only among them. Should the tie persist among some, but not all, of the teams, the ranking of the teams still tied will be determined by again taking into account the victories in the games played only among them, and repeating this same procedure until the tie is entirely resolved. If a tie persists, the ranking will be determined by the goal difference in favour and against in the games played only among the teams still tied.

== Series ==
The first playoff series was determined on 13 April 2023, in the last round of the regular season. Maccabi Playtika Tel Aviv won against Real Madrid, which ensured them the 5th place and a matchup against AS Monaco, who were already guaranteed to finish 4th. The remaining three series were determined a day later. Žalgiris, who started the round outside the playoffs, won against Bayern Munich to clinch 7th place and a matchup against Barcelona, who in the meantime defeated Valencia Basket to overtake Real Madrid for the 2nd place. By beating Panathinaikos at home in a dramatic fashion, Partizan Mozzart Bet finished 6th, with Real Madrid emerging as their opponent. Thus, Fenerbahçe Beko, who started the round at 5th place, dropped to 8th due to worse head-to-head record with Žalgiris, ensuring a matchup against regular season winners Olympiacos.

The schedule for the first four games of the series, with dates and times, was announced on 14 April 2023. Salle Gaston Médecin in Fontvieille hosted the playoffs' opening game, when AS Monaco played Maccabi Playtika Tel Aviv on 25 April 2023 at 20:15 CEST, and two games were played on each match day. The games were played in a 2–2–1 series format, wherein the higher seed hosted the first two games, the lower seed hosted the third and fourth games, and the higher seed returned to host the fifth and final game of each series; the fourth and fifth games of each series were played if necessary. The four series winners advanced to the 2023 EuroLeague Final Four, to be played in Kaunas between 19 and 21 May 2023.

Team 1	Series	Team 2	Game 1	Game 2	Game 3	Game 4	Game 5
Olympiacos (Greece)	3–2	(Turkey) Fenerbahçe Beko	79–68	78–82	72–71	69–73	84–72
AS Monaco (France)	3–2	(Israel) Maccabi Playtika Tel Aviv	67–79	86–74	83–78	69–104	97–86
Real Madrid (Spain)	3–2	(Serbia) Partizan Mozzart Bet	87–89	80–95	82–80	85–78	98–94
Barcelona (Spain)	3–0	(Lithuania) Žalgiris	91–69	89–81	77–66	–	–

=== Olympiacos vs. Fenerbahçe Beko ===
26 April 2023 Game 1	Olympiacos (Hellenic Basketball Federation)	79–68 (Series: 1–0)	(Turkish Basketball Federation) Fenerbahçe Beko	Piraeus
20:45 (CEST)	Scoring by quarter: 19–21, 18–14, 26–16, 16–17
	Pts: Vezenkov 19; Rebs: Vezenkov 6 Asts: Papanikolaou, Walkup 4 PIR: Fall 20	Boxscore	Pts: Motley 15; Rebs: Motley 7 Asts: Gudurić 6 PIR: Gudurić 20	Arena: Peace and Friendship Stadium; Attendance: 11,677; Referees: Miguel Ángel Pérez, Mehdi Difallah, Tomislav Hordov

28 April 2023 Game 2	Olympiacos (Hellenic Basketball Federation)	78–82 (Series: 1–1)	(Turkish Basketball Federation) Fenerbahçe Beko	Piraeus
20:30 (CEST)	Scoring by quarter: 24–10, 13–24, 19–17, 22–31
	Pts: Sloukas, Vezenkov 18; Rebs: Fall 9 Asts: Walkup 6 PIR: Vezenkov 27	Boxscore	Pts: Edwards 16; Rebs: Pierre 7 Asts: Hayes 5 PIR: Hayes 21	Arena: Peace and Friendship Stadium; Attendance: 11,677; Referees: Robert Lottermoser, Damir Javor, Gytis Vilius

3 May 2023 Game 3	Fenerbahçe Beko (Turkish Basketball Federation)	71–72 (Series: 1–2)	(Hellenic Basketball Federation) Olympiacos	Istanbul
19:45 (CEST)	Scoring by quarter: 21–15, 14–23, 16–7, 20–27
	Pts: Dorsey 21; Rebs: Jekiri 7 Asts: Calathes 6 PIR: Jekiri 26	Boxscore	Pts: Sloukas 25; Rebs: Walkup 8 Asts: Sloukas 6 PIR: Sloukas 34	Arena: Ülker Sports and Event Hall; Attendance: 12,678; Referees: Matej Boltauzer, Ilija Belošević, Emilio Pérez

5 May 2023 Game 4	Fenerbahçe Beko (Turkish Basketball Federation)	73–69 (Series: 2–2)	(Hellenic Basketball Federation) Olympiacos	Istanbul
19:45 (CEST)	Scoring by quarter: 18–17, 14–16, 16–16, 25–20
	Pts: Pierre 17; Rebs: Jekiri 5 Asts: Calathes, Motley 4 PIR: Dorsey 16	Boxscore	Pts: McKissic 20; Rebs: Fall 7 Asts: three players 3 PIR: McKissic 23	Arena: Ülker Sports and Event Hall; Attendance: 12,437; Referees: Miguel Ángel Pérez, Saša Pukl, Mehdi Difallah

9 May 2023 Game 5	Olympiacos (Hellenic Basketball Federation)	84–72 (Series: 3–2)	(Turkish Basketball Federation) Fenerbahçe Beko	Piraeus
20:30 (CEST)	Scoring by quarter: 20–15, 24–18, 21–19, 19–20
	Pts: Sloukas 22; Rebs: Papanikolaou 11; Asts: Sloukas 6 PIR: Sloukas 27	Boxscore	Pts: Gudurić 26; Rebs: Hayes 5 Asts: five players 2 PIR: Gudurić 17	Arena: Peace and Friendship Stadium; Attendance: 11,677; Referees: Juan Carlos García, Tomislav Hordov, Milan Nedović

=== AS Monaco vs. Maccabi Playtika Tel Aviv ===
25 April 2023 Game 1	AS Monaco (French Federation of Basketball)	67–79 (Series: 0–1)	(Israeli Basketball Association) Maccabi Playtika Tel Aviv	Fontvieille
20:15 (CEST)	Scoring by quarter: 16–18, 17–18, 17–24, 17–19
	Pts: Diallo, James 15; Rebs: Motiejūnas, James 6 Asts: Diallo 6 PIR: Diallo 20	Boxscore	Pts: Baldwin 20; Rebs: Nebo 8 Asts: Baldwin 6 PIR: Baldwin 26	Arena: Salle Gaston Médecin; Attendance: 4,899; Referees: Saša Pukl, Oļegs Latiševs, Emilio Pérez

27 April 2023 Game 2	AS Monaco (French Federation of Basketball)	86–74 (Series: 1–1)	(Israeli Basketball Association) Maccabi Playtika Tel Aviv	Fontvieille
20:15 (CEST)	Scoring by quarter: 22–18, 20–23, 25–13, 19–20
	Pts: Loyd 33; Rebs: Hall 9 Asts: James 6 PIR: Loyd 35	Boxscore	Pts: Baldwin 17; Rebs: Colson, Nebo 7 Asts: Brown 6 PIR: Brown 16	Arena: Salle Gaston Médecin; Attendance: 4,927; Referees: Juan Carlos García, Borys Ryzhyk, Uroš Nikolić

2 May 2023 Game 3	Maccabi Playtika Tel Aviv (Israeli Basketball Association)	78–83 (Series: 1–2)	(French Federation of Basketball) AS Monaco	Tel Aviv
20:05 (CEST)	Scoring by quarter: 16–22, 16–19, 25–19, 21–23
	Pts: Colson 17; Rebs: Baldwin 8 Asts: Baldwin 6 PIR: Baldwin 24	Boxscore	Pts: James 21; Rebs: Hall 8 Asts: Okobo 5 PIR: James, Motiejūnas 16	Arena: Menora Mivtachim Arena; Attendance: 10,850; Referees: Miguel Ángel Pérez, Carmelo Paternicò, Anne Panther

4 May 2023 Game 4	Maccabi Playtika Tel Aviv (Israeli Basketball Association)	104–69 (Series: 2–2)	(French Federation of Basketball) AS Monaco	Tel Aviv
20:05 (CEST)	Scoring by quarter: 17–24, 30–12, 32–17, 25–16
	Pts: Brown 22; Rebs: three players 6 Asts: Baldwin, Brown 6 PIR: Brown 25	Boxscore	Pts: James 13; Rebs: James 8 Asts: Loyd 4 PIR: James 17	Arena: Menora Mivtachim Arena; Attendance: 10,850; Referees: Juan Carlos García, Emin Moğulkoç, Milan Nedović

10 May 2023 Game 5	AS Monaco (French Federation of Basketball)	97–86 (Series: 3–2)	(Israeli Basketball Association) Maccabi Playtika Tel Aviv	Fontvieille
20:00 (CEST)	Scoring by quarter: 26–33, 27–16, 19–21, 25–16
	Pts: James, Loyd 21; Rebs: Hall 6 Asts: Okobo 6 PIR: Loyd 24	Boxscore	Pts: Baldwin 27; Rebs: Baldwin, Colson 6 Asts: Baldwin 7 PIR: Baldwin 35	Arena: Salle Gaston Médecin; Attendance: 4,923; Referees: Miguel Ángel Pérez, Damir Javor, Luka Kardum

=== Real Madrid vs. Partizan Mozzart Bet ===
25 April 2023 Game 1	Real Madrid (Spanish Basketball Federation)	87–89 (Series: 0–1)	(Basketball Federation of Serbia) Partizan Mozzart Bet	Madrid
20:45 (CEST)	Scoring by quarter: 22–22, 22–26, 20–15, 23–26
	Pts: Deck 24; Rebs: Deck 8 Asts: Musa 3 PIR: Deck 33	Boxscore	Pts: Punter 26; Rebs: LeDay 4 Asts: Punter 6 PIR: Punter 33	Arena: WiZink Center; Attendance: 9,813; Referees: Robert Lottermoser, Gytis Vilius, Emin Moğulkoç

27 April 2023 Game 2	Real Madrid (Spanish Basketball Federation)	80–95 (Series: 0–2)	(Basketball Federation of Serbia) Partizan Mozzart Bet	Madrid
20:45 (CEST)	Scoring by quarter: 21–31, 16–20, 25–24, 18–20
	Pts: Fernández, Hezonja 16; Rebs: Deck, Poirier 7 Asts: Rodríguez 5 PIR: Musa 16	Boxscore	Pts: Exum 19; Rebs: Lessort 9 Asts: three players 3 PIR: Lessort 21	Arena: WiZink Center; Attendance: 10,267; Referees: Sreten Radović, Oļegs Latiševs, Fernando Rocha

2 May 2023 Game 3	Partizan Mozzart Bet (Basketball Federation of Serbia)	80–82 (Series: 2–1)	(Spanish Basketball Federation) Real Madrid	Belgrade
20:30 (CEST)	Scoring by quarter: 32–19, 16–26, 15–21, 17–16
	Pts: Smailagić, LeDay 15; Rebs: LeDay 8 Asts: Nunnally, Madar 3 PIR: LeDay 21	Boxscore	Pts: Tavares 26; Rebs: Hezonja 14; Asts: Musa, Rodríguez 4 PIR: Tavares 41	Arena: Štark Arena; Attendance: 20,091; Referees: Borys Ryzhyk, Mehdi Difallah, Emin Moğulkoç

4 May 2023 Game 4	Partizan Mozzart Bet (Basketball Federation of Serbia)	78–85 (Series: 2–2)	(Spanish Basketball Federation) Real Madrid	Belgrade
20:30 (CEST)	Scoring by quarter: 15–27, 27–18, 13–16, 23–24
	Pts: LeDay 25; Rebs: Lessort 7 Asts: Anđušić, Exum 3 PIR: LeDay 25	Boxscore	Pts: Tavares, Hanga 15; Rebs: Musa 8 Asts: Rodríguez 7 PIR: Tavares 30	Arena: Štark Arena; Attendance: 19,440; Referees: Gytis Vilius, Robert Lottermoser, Carmelo Paternicò

10 May 2023 Game 5	Real Madrid (Spanish Basketball Federation)	98–94 (Series: 3–2)	(Basketball Federation of Serbia) Partizan Mozzart Bet	Madrid
21:00 (CEST)	Scoring by quarter: 22–23, 17–32, 30–21, 29–18
	Pts: Musa 20; Rebs: Tavares 7 Asts: Rodríguez 6 PIR: Rodríguez 26	Boxscore	Pts: Punter 28; Rebs: Madar 4 Asts: Nunnally 5 PIR: Punter 26	Arena: WiZink Center; Attendance: 12,867; Referees: Borys Ryzhyk, Oļegs Latiševs, Mehdi Difallah

=== Barcelona vs. Žalgiris ===
26 April 2023 Game 1	Barcelona (Spanish Basketball Federation)	91–69 (Series: 1–0)	(Lithuanian Basketball Federation) Žalgiris	Barcelona
20:00 (CEST)	Scoring by quarter: 25–13, 23–18, 18–22, 25–16
	Pts: Şanlı 17; Rebs: Tobey, Satoranský 7 Asts: Satoranský 5 PIR: Şanlı 20	Boxscore	Pts: Brazdeikis 14; Rebs: three players 4 Asts: six players 1 PIR: Polonara 12	Arena: Palau Blaugrana; Attendance: 6,731; Referees: Ilija Belošević, Milan Nedović, Luka Kardum

28 April 2023 Game 2	Barcelona (Spanish Basketball Federation)	89–81 (Series: 2–0)	(Lithuanian Basketball Federation) Žalgiris	Barcelona
20:00 (CEST)	Scoring by quarter: 20–21, 25–23, 23–22, 21–15
	Pts: Veselý 26; Rebs: Veselý 6 Asts: Laprovíttola 11; PIR: Veselý 33	Boxscore	Pts: Brazdeikis 20; Rebs: Polonara, Šmits 4 Asts: six players 2 PIR: Brazdeikis 16	Arena: Palau Blaugrana; Attendance: 7,041; Referees: Saša Pukl, Anne Panther, Tomislav Hordov

3 May 2023 Game 3	Žalgiris (Lithuanian Basketball Federation)	66–77 (Series: 0–3)	(Spanish Basketball Federation) Barcelona	Kaunas
19:00 (CEST)	Scoring by quarter: 10–13, 16–16, 22–32, 18–16
	Pts: Ulanovas 13; Rebs: Ulanovas 9 Asts: Polonara 3 PIR: Ulanovas 14	Boxscore	Pts: Satoranský, Veselý 14; Rebs: Jokubaitis 4 Asts: Satoranský 5 PIR: Veselý 20	Arena: Žalgirio Arena; Attendance: 15,293; Referees: Damir Javor, Tomislav Hordov, Uroš Nikolić
