= 2022–23 Greek Basket League =

83rd season of the Greek Basket League

Basket League
- Season: 2022–23
- Dates: 24 October 2022 - 15 June 2023
- Games played: 156
- Teams: 12

Regular season
- Season MVP: (Bulgaria) Sasha Vezenkov
- Relegated: Ionikos

Finals
- Champions: Olympiacos (14th title)
- Runners-up: Panathinaikos
- Finals MVP: (United States) Thomas Walkup

Statistical leaders
Points	(United States) Marcus Denmon	375
Rebounds	(Croatia) Miro Bilan	176
Assists	(United States) Anthony Cowan Jr.	129
Index Rating	(Bulgaria) Sasha Vezenkov	430

The 2022–23 Basket League season was the 31st season of the top-tier Greek professional basketball league, since its establishment in 1992, and the 83rd season of top-flight Greek basketball overall.

The season began on 8 October 2022, and concluded on 15 June 2023 with Olympiacos being crowned champions for the second year in a row, and 14th time in their history, after defeating eternal rivals Panathinaikos 3–1 in the Finals series.

== Teams ==
=== Promotion and relegation (pre-season) ===
Relegated from the 2021–22 Basket League

- Larisa

Note: Although Larisa finished 4th in the 2021–22 season, the team withdrawn from the league due to financial issues.

Promoted from the 2021–22 A2 League

- Karditsa
- Psychiko

Note: Psychiko will not participate in the 2022–23 Greek Basket League for financial reasons.

=== Locations and arenas ===
Locations of the 2022–23 Basket League teams

Club	Location	Arena	Capacity
AEK	Athens (Ano Liosia)	Ano Liosia Olympic Hall	9,327
Apollon	Patras	Apollon Patras Indoor Hall	3,500
Aris	Thessaloniki	Alexandrio Melathron	5,138
Ionikos	Piraeus (Nikaia)	Platon Indoor Hall	1,206
Karditsa	Karditsa	Karditsa New Indoor Hall	3,000
Kolossos	Rhodes	Kallithea Palais des Sports	1,400
Lavrio	Lavrio	Lavrio Indoor Hall	1,700
Olympiacos	Piraeus	Peace and Friendship Stadium	11,319
Panathinaikos	Athens (Marousi)	OAKA Indoor Hall	19,443
PAOK	Thessaloniki (Pylaia)	PAOK Sports Arena	8,500
Peristeri	Athens (Peristeri)	Peristeri Arena	4,000
Promitheas	Patras	Dimitris Tofalos Arena	4,150

== Regular season ==
=== League table ===
Pos	Team	Pld	W	L	PF	PA	PD	Pts	Qualification or relegation
1	Olympiacos	22	22	0	2029	1567	+462	44	Advanced to playoffs
2	Panathinaikos	22	16	6	1862	1571	+291	38	Advanced to playoffs
3	Peristeri bwin	22	14	8	1852	1731	+121	36	Advanced to playoffs
4	PAOK mateco	22	13	9	1764	1701	+63	35	Advanced to playoffs
5	Promitheas Patras	22	12	10	1687	1708	−21	34	Advanced to playoffs
6	AEK	22	12	10	1668	1686	−18	34	Advanced to playoffs
7	Kolossos H Hotels	22	11	11	1718	1735	−17	33	Advanced to playoffs
8	Aris Thessaloniki	22	11	11	1735	1679	+56	33	Advanced to playoffs
9	Lavrio Megabolt	22	7	15	1677	1817	−140	29	
10	Karditsa	22	5	17	1584	1800	−216	27	
11	Apollon Patras	22	5	17	1530	1745	−215	27	
12	Ionikos	22	4	18	1623	1989	−366	26	Relegated to Greek A2 Basket League

Updated to match(es) played on 11 April 2023. Source: ESAKE

=== Results ===
Home \ Away	AEK	APO	ARI	ION	KAR	KOL	LAV	OLY	PAN	PAOK	PER	PRO
AEK	—	83–68	63–76	92–77	79–63	95–89	81–95	78–85	77–73	71–83	68–64	73–70
Apollon	61–69	—	74–82	93–66	78–72	85–66	71–54	61–87	65–96	65–88	71–77	68–57
Aris Thessaloniki	74–64	70–57	—	103–64	85–68	68–74	87–61	66–83	69–65	77–70	78–83	95–79
Ionikos	79–98	79–75	90–97	—	78–71	89–84	82–90	81–107	62–86	74–71	75–102	66–74
Karditsa	64–70	80–65	78–77	85–83	—	59–57	70–85	75–89	82–99	63–92	86–80	68–81
Kolossos	73–67	88–68	96–90	89–48	73–62	—	90–87	79–80	59–96	80–76	88–82	69–67
Lavrio	67–84	74–68	81–70	95–63	81–80	83–97	—	75–103	84–86	70–75	79–85	80–90
Olympiacos	111–71	97–60	89–75	100–68	92–61	99–64	98–61	—	68–66	100–70	101–79	89–77
Panathinaikos	71–57	108–75	96–79	102–70	91–75	77–67	93–70	74–76	—	87–63	72–71	87–79
PAOK	78–72	97–60	88–66	82–78	87–79	89–82	93–68	68–88	81–73	—	70–81	97–92
Peristeri	80–84	75–69	92–90	96–67	102–77	88–78	77–66	86–87	96–89	85–77	—	88–68
Promitheas	85–72	80–71	64–61	97–84	76–66	80–76	74–71	72–100	44–75	90–69	91–83	—

Legend: Blue = home team win; Red = away team win.
Matches with lighter background shading were decided after overtime.

== Playoffs ==
The eight highest ranked teams in the regular season qualify for the playoffs. Quarterfinals are being played in a "best of 3" format, while the rest of the series are being played in a "best of 5" format.

=== Bracket ===
Quarter-finals
Olympiacos	2
Aris	0
PAOK	2
Promitheas	1
Panathinaikos	2
Kolossos	0
Peristeri	2
AEK	0

Semi-finals
Olympiacos	3
PAOK	0
Panathinaikos	3
Peristeri	2

Final
Olympiacos	3
Panathinaikos	1
Third place
Peristeri	3
PAOK	0

=== Quarterfinals (best of 3) ===
Team 1	Series	Team 2	Game 1	Game 2	Game 3
Olympiacos	2–0	Aris	97–73	82–58	
PAOK	2–1	Promitheas	78–75	63–77	81–78
Panathinaikos	2–0	Kolossos	85–76	89–47	
Peristeri	2–0	AEK	87–73	113–99	

=== Semifinals (best of 5) ===
Team 1	Series	Team 2	Game 1	Game 2	Game 3	Game 4	Game 5
Olympiacos	3–0	PAOK	83–65	97–77	75–54		
Panathinaikos	3–2	Peristeri	101–57	58–73	89–80	71–76	81–67

==== Third place series (best of 5) ====
Team 1	Series	Team 2	Game 1	Game 2	Game 3	Game 4	Game 5
Peristeri	3–0	PAOK	71–65	81–64	73–51		

== Finals ==
Team 1	Series	Team 2	Game 1	Game 2	Game 3	Game 4	Game 5
Olympiacos	3–1	Panathinaikos	73–70	65–67	75–52	63–35	

=== Game 1 ===
4 June 2023	Olympiacos	73–70	Panathinaikos
21:15	Scoring by quarter: 26–14, 15–19, 20–15, 12–22
	Pts: Vezenkov 20; Walkup 13; Rebs: Vezenkov 7 Asts: Walkup 7 Fall 5	Boxscore	Pts: Grigonis 17; Lee 14; Rebs: Papagiannis 9 Agravanis 7 Asts: Lee 8 Ponitka 3	Arena: Peace and Friendship Stadium; Referees: Poursanidis; Tsaroucha; Tsimpouris

=== Game 2 ===
8 June 2023	Panathinaikos	67–65	Olympiacos
21:15	Scoring by quarter: 25–13, 8–22, 18–15, 16–15
	Pts: Ponitka 12; Lee 12; Rebs: Ponitka 6 Gudaitis 5 Asts: Lee 5	Boxscore	Pts: Papanikolaou 15; Walkup 14; Rebs: Fall 6 Bolomboy 5 Asts: Papanikolaou 7 Fall 3	Arena: O.A.C.A. Olympic Indoor Hall; Referees: Papapetrou; Tsolakos; Tiganis

=== Game 3 ===
11 June 2023	Olympiacos	75–52	Panathinaikos
21:15	Scoring by quarter: 18–19, 18–9, 21–13, 18–11
	Pts: Sloukas 14; Fall 11; McKissic 11; Rebs: Bolomboy 6 Peters 5 Fall 5 Asts: Sloukas 7 Walkup 6	Boxscore	Pts: Grigonis 13; Lee 11; Rebs: Papagiannis 4 Gudaitis 4 Asts: Lee 6 Grigonis 2	Arena: Peace and Friendship Stadium; Referees: Koromilas; Theonas; Karpanos

=== Game 4 ===
15 June 2023	Panathinaikos	35–63	Olympiacos
21:15	Scoring by quarter: 15–24, 11–24, 9–15(forfeited), (forfeited)
	Pts: Mantzoukas 6 Papagiannis 6 Rebs: Gudaitis 5 Asts: Lee 5 Kalaitzakis 3	Boxscore	Pts: Peters 11; Vezenkov 11; Rebs: Walkup 6 Asts: Walkup 5	Arena: O.A.C.A. Olympic Indoor Hall; Referees: Koromilas; Papapetrou; Theonas

== Final standings ==
Pos	Team	Pld	W	L	Qualification or Relegation
1	Olympiacos	31	30	1	Qualification to the EuroLeague
2	Panathinaikos	33	22	11	Qualification to the EuroLeague
3	Peristeri	32	21	11	Qualification to the Basketball Champions League
4	PAOK	31	15	16	Qualification to the Basketball Champions League
5	Promitheas Patras	25	13	12	Qualification to the Basketball Champions League
6	AEK	24	12	12	Qualification to the Basketball Champions League
7	Kolossos	24	11	13	
8	Aris	24	11	13	Qualification to the EuroCup
9	Lavrio	22	7	15	
10	Karditsa	22	5	17	
11	Apollon Patras	22	5	17	
12	Ionikos	22	4	18	Relegation to the Greek A2 League

== Awards ==
All official awards of the 2022–23 Greek Basket League.

=== Greek League MVP ===
Player	Team
(Bulgaria) Sasha Vezenkov	Olympiacos

=== Greek League Finals MVP ===
Player	Team
(United States) Thomas Walkup	Olympiacos

=== All-Greek League Team ===
Pos.	Player	Team
G	(Greece) Kostas Sloukas	Olympiacos
G	(France) Sylvain Francisco	Peristeri
F	(Greece) Kostas Papanikolaou	Olympiacos
F	(Bulgaria) Sasha Vezenkov	Olympiacos
C	(France) Moustapha Fall	Olympiacos

=== Best Coach ===
Player	Team
(Greece) Giorgos Bartzokas	Olympiacos

=== Defensive Player of the Year ===
Player	Team
(United States) Thomas Walkup	Olympiacos

=== Best Young Player ===
Player	Team
(Greece) Lefteris Mantzoukas	Panathinaikos

=== Most Improved Player ===
Player	Team
(Greece) Lefteris Mantzoukas	Panathinaikos

=== Most Popular Player ===
Player	Team
(Bulgaria) Sasha Vezenkov	Olympiacos

=== Most Spectacular Player ===
Player	Team
(United States) Nate Renfro	PAOK

== Statistical leaders ==
The Greek Basket League counts official stats leaders by stats totals, and not by per game averages. It also counts the total stats for both regular season combined.

=== Performance Index Rating ===
Pos	Player	Club	PIR
1	(Bulgaria) Sasha Vezenkov	Olympiacos	430
2	(Croatia) Miro Bilan	Peristeri	389
3	(Greece) Loukas Mavrokefalidis	Ionikos	371
4	(Greece) Giorgos Papagiannis	Panathinaikos	358
5	(France) Sylvain Francisco	Peristeri	354

=== Points ===
Pos	Player	Club	Total Points
1	(United States) Marcus Denmon	Peristeri	375
2	(United States) Jaylen Hands	PAOK	361
3	(Netherlands) Yannick Franke	PAOK	359
4	(Bulgaria) Sasha Vezenkov	Olympiacos	358
5	(Greece) Loukas Mavrokefalidis	Ionikos	358

=== Rebounds ===
Pos	Player	Club	Total Rebounds
1	(Croatia) Miro Bilan	Peristeri	176
2	(United States) Akil Mitchell	AEK	163
3	(United States) Chevez Goodwin	Aris	162
4	(United States) Deontae Hawkins	Ionikos	152
5	(United States) Savion Flagg	Lavrio	151

=== Assists ===
Pos	Player	Club	Total Assists
1	(United States) Anthony Cowan Jr.	Promitheas Patras	129
2	(United States) Thomas Walkup	Olympiacos	124
3	(France) Sylvain Francisco	Peristeri	113
4	(Greece) Zois Karampelas	Apollon Patras	100
5	(United States) Rayshawn Simmons	Ionikos	94

== Clubs in international competitions ==
Team	Competition	Result
Olympiacos	EuroLeague	Final Four, 2nd place
Panathinaikos	EuroLeague	Regular season, 17th place
Promitheas	EuroCup	Playoffs, Quarterfinals
AEK	Champions League	Playoffs, Quarterfinals
Peristeri	Champions League	Play-ins
PAOK	Champions League	Play-ins
Aris	FIBA Europe Cup	Qualification rounds, Quarterfinals

== See also ==
- 2022 Greek Basketball Super Cup
- 2022–23 Greek Basketball Cup
