= 2023 EuroLeague Final Four =

Basketball tournament in Kaunas

- Season: 2022–23 EuroLeague

Tournament details
- Arena: Žalgirio Arena; Kaunas, Lithuania
- Dates: 19–21 May 2023

Final positions
- Champions: (Spanish Basketball Federation) Real Madrid (11th title)
- Runners-up: (Hellenic Basketball Federation) Olympiacos
- Third place: (French Federation of Basketball) AS Monaco
- Fourth place: (Spanish Basketball Federation) Barcelona

Awards and statistics
- MVP: (Cape Verde) Edy Tavares
- Top scorer(s): (Bulgaria) Sasha Vezenkov (48 points)

The 2023 EuroLeague Final Four was the concluding EuroLeague Final Four tournament of the 2022–23 EuroLeague season, the 66th season of Europe's premier club basketball tournament, and the 23rd season since it was first organised by Euroleague Basketball. It was the 36th Final Four of the modern EuroLeague Final Four era (1988–present), and the 38th time overall that the competition has concluded with a final four format. Euroleague Basketball announced that the Final Four would be played at the Žalgirio Arena in Kaunas, Lithuania, on 19–21 May 2023.

Real Madrid won a record-extending 11th title in the final against Olympiacos.

== Venue ==
On 19 December 2022, it was announced that the Final Four would be played at the Žalgirio Arena in Kaunas, Lithuania, on 19–21 May 2023.

Kaunas	2023 EuroLeague Final Four (Europe)
Žalgirio Arena	2023 EuroLeague Final Four (Europe)
Capacity: 15,415	2023 EuroLeague Final Four (Europe)

== Teams ==
Team	Qualified date	Participations (bold indicates winners)
(Hellenic Basketball Federation) Olympiacos	9 May 2023	11 (1994, 1995, **1997**, 1999, 2009, 2010, **2012**, **2013**, 2015, 2017, 2022)
(French Federation of Basketball) AS Monaco	10 May 2023	0 (debut)
(Spanish Basketball Federation) Barcelona	3 May 2023	16 (1989, 1990, 1991, 1994, 1996, 1997, 2000, **2003**, 2006, 2009, **2010**, 2012, 2013, 2014, 2021, 2022)
(Spanish Basketball Federation) Real Madrid	10 May 2023	12 (**1967**, 1993, **1995**, 1996, 2011, 2013, 2014, **2015**, 2017, **2018**, 2019, 2022)

== Bracket ==
Semifinals
19 May
**(Hellenic Basketball Federation) Olympiacos**	**76**
(French Federation of Basketball) AS Monaco	62
19 May
(Spanish Basketball Federation) Barcelona	66
**(Spanish Basketball Federation) Real Madrid**	**78**

Championship game
21 May
(Hellenic Basketball Federation) Olympiacos	78
**(Spanish Basketball Federation) Real Madrid**	**79**
Third place game
21 May
**(French Federation of Basketball) AS Monaco**	**78**
(Spanish Basketball Federation) Barcelona	66

== Semifinals ==
=== Semifinal A ===
19 May 2023	**Olympiacos** (Hellenic Basketball Federation)	**76**–62	(French Federation of Basketball) AS Monaco	Kaunas, Lithuania
17:00 (CEST)	Scoring by quarter: 14–**20**, 15–**21**, **27**–2, **20**–19
	Pts: Vezenkov 19; Rebs: Papanikolaou 8 Asts: Sloukas, Walkup 7 PIR: Papanikolaou 21	Boxscore	Pts: Okobo, James 17; Rebs: Loyd, Hall 7 Asts: Okobo 5 PIR: Loyd 15	Arena: Žalgirio Arena; Attendance: 11,673; Referees: (Basketball Federation of Ukraine) Borys Ryzhyk, (Latvian Basketball Association) Oļegs Latiševs, (Lithuanian Basketball Federation) Gytis Vilius

Starters:			Pts	Reb	Ast
PG	0	(Greece) Thomas Walkup	0	3	7
SG	3	(United States) Isaiah Canaan	7	1	1
SF	16	(Greece) Kostas Papanikolaou	15	8	0
PF	14	(Bulgaria) Sasha Vezenkov	19	6	3
C	10	(France) Moustapha Fall	12	4	4
Reserves:					
G	4	(Greece) Michalis Lountzis	0	0	0
SG	5	(Greece) Giannoulis Larentzakis	4	3	0
G	11	(Greece) Kostas Sloukas	9	1	7
PF	21	(Russia) Joel Bolomboy	2	5	0
F	25	(Bosnia and Herzegovina) Alec Peters	0	1	0
C	28	(United States) Tarik Black	3	1	0
G	77	(Azerbaijan) Shaquielle McKissic	5	1	1
Head coach:
(Hellenic Basketball Federation) Georgios Bartzokas

**Olympiacos**	**Monaco**

Olympiacos	Statistics	Monaco
18/29 (62.1%)	2-pt field goals	15/31 (48.4%)
7/19 (36.8%)	3-pt field goals	5/24 (20.8%)
19/33 (57.6%)	Free throws	17/24 (70.8%)
9	Offensive rebounds	10
28	Defensive rebounds	23
37	Total rebounds	33
23	Assists	10
12	Turnovers	12
7	Steals	5
1	Blocks	1
21	Fouls	24

Starters:			Pts	Reb	Ast
PG	55	(United States) Mike James	17	3	2
SG	3	(United States) Jordan Loyd	11	7	2
SF	24	(Ghana) Yakuba Ouattara	0	1	0
PF	00	(United States) John Brown	4	3	0
C	20	(Lithuania) Donatas Motiejūnas	7	5	0
Reserves:					
G	0	(France) Élie Okobo	17	1	5
PF	1	(Nigeria) Chima Moneke	2	1	1
F	4	(United States) Jaron Blossomgame	DNP		
PF	5	(France) Yoan Makoundou	DNP		
SF	11	(United States) Alpha Diallo	2	4	0
PG	32	(France) Matthew Strazel	DNP		
C	45	(United States) Donta Hall	2	7	0
Head coach:
(Basketball Federation of Serbia) Saša Obradović

=== Semifinal B ===
19 May 2023	Barcelona (Spanish Basketball Federation)	66–**78**	(Spanish Basketball Federation) **Real Madrid**	Kaunas, Lithuania
20:00 (CEST)	Scoring by quarter: 18–18, **24**–18, 13–**22**, 11–**20**
	Pts: Abrines 16; Rebs: Satoranský 11; Asts: three players 3 PIR: Abrines 14	Boxscore	Pts: Tavares 20; Rebs: Tavares 15; Asts: Rodríguez, Llull 5 PIR: Tavares 39	Arena: Žalgirio Arena; Attendance: 11,411; Referees: (Basketball Federation of Slovenia) Saša Pukl, (Turkish Basketball Federation) Emin Moğulkoç, (French Federation of Basketball) Mehdi Difallah

Starters:			Pts	Reb	Ast
PG	13	(Czech Republic) Tomáš Satoranský	7	11	3
SG	20	(Argentina) Nicolás Laprovíttola	12	3	3
SF	21	(Spain) Álex Abrines	16	4	0
PF	33	(Spain) Nikola Mirotić	3	1	1
C	5	(Turkey) Sertaç Şanlı	0	3	0
Reserves:					
C	6	(Czech Republic) Jan Veselý	4	6	1
SF	8	(Spain) Sergi Martínez	0	1	1
F	10	(Serbia) Nikola Kalinić	6	2	0
C	23	(Slovenia) Mike Tobey	DNP		
SG	24	(Slovakia) Kyle Kuric	11	2	0
PG	31	(Lithuania) Rokas Jokubaitis	6	2	3
C	46	(Nigeria) James Nnaji	1	2	1
Head coach:
(Lithuanian Basketball Federation) Šarūnas Jasikevičius

**Barcelona**	**Real Madrid**

Barcelona	Statistics	Real Madrid
10/30 (33.3%)	2-pt field goals	21/45 (46.7%)
14/39 (35.9%)	3-pt field goals	7/22 (31.8%)
4/11 (36.4%)	Free throws	15/19 (78.9%)
14	Offensive rebounds	13
29	Defensive rebounds	32
43	Total rebounds	45
13	Assists	17
14	Turnovers	11
8	Steals	6
3	Blocks	6
23	Fouls	21

Starters:			Pts	Reb	Ast
PG	0	(United States) Nigel Williams-Goss	10	1	2
SG	31	(Bosnia and Herzegovina) Džanan Musa	7	2	2
SF	8	(Hungary) Ádám Hanga	0	6	2
PF	30	(Senegal) Eli Ndiaye	2	2	0
C	22	(Cape Verde) Edy Tavares	20	15	1
Reserves:					
SG	1	(France) Fabien Causeur	0	0	0
C	3	(Slovenia) Anthony Randolph	6	2	0
SG	5	(Spain) Rudy Fernández	2	4	0
SF	6	(Spain) Alberto Abalde	DNP		
F	11	(Croatia) Mario Hezonja	14	9	0
PG	13	(Spain) Sergio Rodríguez	12	0	5
G	23	(Spain) Sergio Llull	5	0	5
Head coach:
(Spanish Basketball Federation) Chus Mateo

== Third place game ==
21 May 2023	**AS Monaco** (French Federation of Basketball)	**78**–66	(Spanish Basketball Federation) Barcelona	Kaunas, Lithuania
16:00 (CEST)	Scoring by quarter: **24**–13, **20**–15, 16–**17**, 18–**21**
	Pts: Strazel 14; Rebs: Hall 11; Asts: Loyd 6 PIR: Hall 17	Boxscore	Pts: Mirotić 15; Rebs: Nnaji, Veselý 4 Asts: three players 4 PIR: Mirotić 14	Arena: Žalgirio Arena; Attendance: 9,333; Referees: (Basketball Federation of Ukraine) Borys Ryzhyk, (German Basketball Federation) Anne Panther, (Croatian Basketball Federation) Tomislav Hordov

Starters:			Pts	Reb	Ast
PG	55	(United States) Mike James	3	0	1
SG	3	(United States) Jordan Loyd	9	2	6
SF	11	(United States) Alpha Diallo	10	6	2
PF	00	(United States) John Brown	2	3	0
C	20	(Lithuania) Donatas Motiejūnas	2	2	1
Reserves:					
G	0	(France) Élie Okobo	10	3	4
PF	1	(Nigeria) Chima Moneke	4	3	0
F	4	(United States) Jaron Blossomgame	9	1	0
PF	5	(France) Yoan Makoundou	4	1	0
SF	24	(Ghana) Yakuba Ouattara	2	1	1
PG	32	(France) Matthew Strazel	14	2	1
C	45	(United States) Donta Hall	9	11	1
Head coach:
(Basketball Federation of Serbia) Saša Obradović

**Monaco**	**Barcelona**

Monaco	Statistics	Barcelona
28/44 (63.6%)	2-pt field goals	18/34 (52.9%)
3/15 (20%)	3-pt field goals	8/27 (29.6%)
13/18 (72.2%)	Free throws	6/8 (75%)
9	Offensive rebounds	8
28	Defensive rebounds	21
37	Total rebounds	29
17	Assists	21
14	Turnovers	13
8	Steals	10
3	Blocks	2
18	Fouls	20

Starters:			Pts	Reb	Ast
PG	13	(Czech Republic) Tomáš Satoranský	7	3	4
SG	20	(Argentina) Nicolás Laprovíttola	5	0	4
SF	21	(Spain) Álex Abrines	9	3	2
PF	33	(Spain) Nikola Mirotić	15	2	1
C	5	(Turkey) Sertaç Şanlı	2	1	0
Reserves:					
C	6	(Czech Republic) Jan Veselý	6	4	1
SF	8	(Spain) Sergi Martínez	2	0	0
F	10	(Serbia) Nikola Kalinić	4	2	2
C	23	(Slovenia) Mike Tobey	2	3	1
SG	24	(Slovakia) Kyle Kuric	7	2	1
PG	31	(Lithuania) Rokas Jokubaitis	0	0	4
C	46	(Nigeria) James Nnaji	7	4	1
Head coach:
(Lithuanian Basketball Federation) Šarūnas Jasikevičius

== Championship game ==
21 May 2023	Olympiacos (Hellenic Basketball Federation)	78–**79**	(Spanish Basketball Federation) **Real Madrid**	Kaunas, Lithuania
19:00 (CEST)	Scoring by quarter: **24**–17, 21–**28**, **18**–14, 15–**20**
	Pts: Vezenkov 29; Rebs: Vezenkov 9 Asts: Walkup 6 PIR: Vezenkov 34	Boxscore	Pts: Rodríguez 15; Rebs: Tavares 10; Asts: Rodríguez 9 PIR: Rodríguez 23	Arena: Žalgirio Arena; Attendance: 11,066; Referees: (Basketball Federation of Slovenia) Saša Pukl, (Lithuanian Basketball Federation) Gytis Vilius, (French Federation of Basketball) Mehdi Difallah

Starters:			Pts	Reb	Ast
PG	0	(Greece) Thomas Walkup	0	2	6
SG	3	(United States) Isaiah Canaan	21	2	2
SF	16	(Greece) Kostas Papanikolaou	6	3	2
PF	14	(Bulgaria) Sasha Vezenkov	29	9	4
C	10	(France) Moustapha Fall	0	5	1
Reserves:					
G	4	(Greece) Michalis Lountzis	DNP		
SG	5	(Greece) Giannoulis Larentzakis	0	0	1
G	11	(Greece) Kostas Sloukas	6	2	3
PF	21	(Russia) Joel Bolomboy	2	1	0
F	25	(Bosnia and Herzegovina) Alec Peters	DNP		
C	28	(United States) Tarik Black	0	0	0
G	77	(Azerbaijan) Shaquielle McKissic	14	0	2
Head coach:
(Hellenic Basketball Federation) Georgios Bartzokas

**Olympiacos**	**Real Madrid**

Olympiacos	Statistics	Real Madrid
16/26 (61.5%)	2-pt field goals	17/29 (58.6%)
12/36 (33.3%)	3-pt field goals	12/33 (36.4%)
10/15 (66.7%)	Free throws	9/11 (81.8%)
10	Offensive rebounds	13
20	Defensive rebounds	24
30	Total rebounds	37
21	Assists	19
6	Turnovers	10
1	Steals	6
1	Blocks	0
17	Fouls	18

2022–23 EuroLeague champions

**Real Madrid**
(11th title)

Starters:			Pts	Reb	Ast
PG	0	(United States) Nigel Williams-Goss	9	2	2
SG	31	(Bosnia and Herzegovina) Džanan Musa	6	1	4
SF	8	(Hungary) Ádám Hanga	2	3	0
PF	30	(Senegal) Eli Ndiaye	3	0	0
C	22	(Cape Verde) Edy Tavares	13	10	2
Reserves:					
SG	1	(France) Fabien Causeur	11	2	0
C	3	(Slovenia) Anthony Randolph	3	2	0
SG	5	(Spain) Rudy Fernández	3	2	2
SF	6	(Spain) Alberto Abalde	DNP		
F	11	(Croatia) Mario Hezonja	12	3	0
PG	13	(Spain) Sergio Rodríguez	15	4	9
G	23	(Spain) Sergio Llull	2	1	0
Head coach:
(Spanish Basketball Federation) Chus Mateo

- Team captains (C): (Greece) Kostas Papanikolaou (Olympiacos) and (Spain) Sergio Llull (Real Madrid)
