= Thomas Walkup =

Greek-American basketball player (born 1992)

- Walkup with Olympiacos in 2026

No. 44 – Dubai Basketball
- Position: Point guard / shooting guard
- League: ABA League; EuroLeague

Personal information
- Born: December 30, 1992 (age 33) Pasadena, Texas, U.S.
- Listed height: 6 ft 4 in (1.93 m)
- Listed weight: 203 lb (92 kg)

Career information
- High school: Deer Park (Deer Park, Texas)
- College: Stephen F. Austin (2012–2016)
- NBA draft: 2016: undrafted
- Playing career: 2016–present

Career history
- 2016–2017: Windy City Bulls
- 2017–2018: Riesen Ludwigsburg
- 2018–2021: Žalgiris Kaunas
- 2021–2026: Olympiacos
- 2026–present: Dubai Basketball

Career highlights
- EuroLeague champion (2026); EuroLeague Best Defender (2024); EuroLeague steals leader (2023); 4× Greek League champion (2022, 2023, 2025, 2026); 3× Greek Cup winner (2022–2024); 4× Greek Super Cup winner (2022–2025); Greek League Finals MVP (2023); 2× Greek All-Star (2022, 2023); 3× Greek League Defensive Player of the Year (2022, 2023, 2026); 3× LKL champion (2019–2021); 2× Lithuanian Cup winner (2020, 2021); LKL Finals MVP (2021); All-LKL Team (2020); 3× LKL Defensive Player of the Year (2019–2021); All-Bundesliga First Team (2018); Bundesliga Best Defender (2018); German All Star (2018); Lou Henson Award (2016); 2× Southland Player of the Year (2015, 2016); 2× Honorable mention All-American – AP (2015, 2016); 2× First-team All-Southland (2015, 2016); 3× All-Southland Defensive Team (2014–2016); 3× Southland tournament MVP (2014–2016)
- Stats at Basketball Reference

Thomas Ryan Walkup (Greek: Τόμας Γουόκαπ, born December 30, 1992) is a Greek-American professional basketball player for Dubai Basketball of the ABA League and the EuroLeague. He also represents the Greek national team in international competition. Widely considered one of the premier defensive players in European basketball, he was named the EuroLeague Best Defender in 2024.

Walkup played college basketball for Stephen F. Austin State University, before being named Southland Conference Player of the Year for two consecutive seasons (2015 and 2016). He reached five consecutive EuroLeague Final Four tournaments with Olympiakos between 2022 and 2026, including the competition's final in 2023 & winning it in 2026.

== High school career ==
Born in Pasadena, Texas, Walkup attended Deer Park High School in nearby Deer Park. He was a point guard in his junior season for the varsity basketball team and averaged 10.1 points, 5.0 blocks, 4.6 assists, and 1.9 steals per game. Walkup also earned all-district honors after helping the Deer finish the season with a 24–11 record. He also lifted them to a bi-district round victory at the Class 5A playoffs. As a senior, Walkup averaged 25.9 points and 8.9 rebounds with Deer Park. In his years with the school, he faced two ACL injuries and a broken foot.

In November 2010, Walkup committed to play college basketball at Stephen F. Austin State University for the Lumberjacks. He chose the school because he aspired to compete in the NCAA Division I tournament and they ran a successful program. Houston Baptist was the only other school that offered him a scholarship. Walkup later said, "There was a reason I didn’t have any other scholarship offers besides those two—I wasn't any good." His father commented on Walkup's recruitment, "I'm sure scouts looked at him and said, 'Well, he's a 6–4 white guy and he can't shoot and he plays the four. And we don't need that.'"

== College career ==
Walkup immediately assumed a big role with the Lumberjacks as the team's sixth man during his freshman season. In 18.5 minutes per game, he averaged 4.4 points and 3.6 rebounds. He recorded a season-best 11 points twice, against Tulsa on November 24, 2012, and versus McNeese State on January 5, 2013. That season, the Lumberjacks won a school-record 27 games, winning their third Southland Conference title of all-time and qualifying for the National Invitation Tournament (NIT).

As a junior at Stephen F. Austin, Walkup averaged 15.5 points and 6.5 rebounds per game. His teammates began referring to him as "The Snake", after establishing his ability for rebounds, consistently drawing fouls for opposing players, and providing scrappy defense for the Lumberjacks. He was named Southland Conference Player of the Year in 2015.

In the first round of the 2016 NCAA Tournament, Walkup scored 33 points in a 70–56 upset over third-seeded West Virginia. He shot 19-for-20 on free throws.

== Professional career ==
=== Windy City Bulls (2016–2017) ===
After going undrafted in the 2016 NBA draft, Walkup joined the Golden State Warriors for the 2016 NBA Summer League. On September 26, 2016, he signed with the Chicago Bulls. However, he was later waived by the Bulls on October 21 after appearing in four preseason games. On October 30, he was acquired by the Windy City Bulls of the NBA Development League as an affiliate player of Chicago.

=== Riesen Ludwigsburg (2017–2021) ===
On August 10, 2017, Walkup signed with MHP Riesen Ludwigsburg of the German Basketball Bundesliga for the 2017–18 season. In April 2018, he was named to the All-German BBL First Team. On June 21, 2018, Walkup signed with Žalgiris Kaunas of the Lithuanian Basketball League. Walkup received the LKL Defensive Player of the Year Award in 2019. On 27 November 2019, Walkup extended his contract with Žalgiris until the summer of 2021.

=== Olympiacos (2021–2026) ===
On June 11, 2021, Walkup signed a three-year deal with Greek club Olympiacos of the EuroLeague. On April 12, 2023, he agreed on a three-year contract extension through 2027.

On May 24, 2026, he won the Euroleague with Olympiacos after defeating Real Madrid 92–85 in the final.

In August 2026 he requested his release from Olympiacos citing his role has been diminished after recent transfers to the roster and wanted to join Dubai. Olympiacos rejected his request. He did not join the team for preseason practice. Euroleague started an investigation into the issue.

=== Dubai Basketball (2026–present) ===
On September 7, 2026, Walkup signed with Dubai Basketball of the ABA League and the EuroLeague.

== Greek national team career ==
On April 18, 2023, Walkup received Greek citizenship through honorary naturalization, which was signed by the Minister of the Interior, Makis Voridis, and the President of Greece, Katerina Sakellaropoulou. This citizenship enabled him to play for the senior Greece national basketball team in major FIBA international competitions and to compete as a native player in Greece's top-tier domestic basketball competitions, including the Greek Basket League, the Greek Basketball Cup, and the Greek Basketball Super Cup.

Walkup played with Greece at the 2024 Olympic Games, where the Greek national team reached the quarterfinals.

== Career statistics ==
Legend
GP	Games played	GS	Games started	MPG	Minutes per game
FG%	Field-goal percentage	3P%	3-point field-goal percentage	FT%	Free-throw percentage
RPG	Rebounds per game	APG	Assists per game	SPG	Steals per game
BPG	Blocks per game	PPG	Points per game	PIR	Performance index rating
**Bold**	Career high

=== EuroLeague ===
†	Denotes season in which Walkup won the EuroLeague
*	Led the league

Year	Team	GP	GS	MPG	FG%	3P%	FT%	RPG	APG	SPG	BPG	PPG	PIR
2018–19	Žalgiris	34	18	16.8	.486	.295	.806	2.6	2.2	.5	—	5.2	5.6
2019–20	Žalgiris	28*	21	25.8	**.495**	**.467**	.857	**3.6**	5.5	1.0	**.1**	**9.6**	**12.7**
2020–21	Žalgiris	34	34	24.1	.423	.371	**.906**	3.0	4.5	1.1	—	8.2	10.6
2021–22	Olympiacos	37	37	22.4	.416	.297	.739	2.3	2.7	1.1	**.1**	6.3	7.5
2022–23	Olympiacos	**41***	**41***	25.1	.443	.333	.854	2.8	5.6	**1.8***	**.1**	7.3	11.5
2023–24	Olympiacos	40	40	**26.4**	.376	.302	.767	3.0	4.8	1.6	**.1**	7.9	9.3
2024–25	Olympiacos	26	20	20.1	.426	.340	.615	2.3	4.6	1.0	**.1**	4.0	7.2
2025–26†	Olympiacos	37	37	24.0	.412	.367	.769	2.6	**5.7**	.9	—	5.3	9.5
Career		277	248	23.3	.430	.341	.801	2.8	4.5	1.1	.1	6.8	9.3

=== Basketball Champions League ===
Year	Team	GP	GS	MPG	FG%	3P%	FT%	RPG	APG	SPG	BPG	PPG
2017–18	Riesen Ludwigsburg	20	20	28.3	.468	.365	.841	4.5	4.5	1.9	.2	11.9
Career		20	20	28.3	.468	.365	.841	4.5	4.5	1.9	.2	11.9

=== Domestic leagues ===
†	Denotes season in which Walkup won a League title

Year	Team	League	GP	MPG	FG%	3P%	FT%	RPG	APG	SPG	BPG	PPG
2016–17	(United States) Windy City Bulls	D-League	**40**	24.4	.457	.282	**.845**	3.9	3.4	1.0	**.1**	7.6
2017–18	(Germany) Riesen Ludwigsburg	BBL	39	**27.6**	**.500**	**.418**	.828	**5.1**	4.5	**1.7**	**.1**	**11.8**
2018–19†	(Lithuania) Žalgiris	LKL	43	18.7	.478	.291	.787	3.1	2.9	1.2	.0	6.6
2019–20†	(Lithuania) Žalgiris	LKL	22	17.1	.490	.395	.826	3.2	4.2	.9	—	7.1
2020–21†	(Lithuania) Žalgiris	LKL	38	21.9	.480	.403	.833	3.4	5.7	**1.7**	**.1**	9.4
2021–22†	(Greece) Olympiacos	GBL	31	18.2	.414	.286	.775	2.4	3.6	1.2	.0	6.0
2022–23†	(Greece) Olympiacos	GBL	31	20.7	.476	.325	.688	2.4	5.5	1.4	**.1**	5.5
2023–24	(Greece) Olympiacos	GBL	31	23.4	.487	.410	.717	3.2	4.7	1.0	**.1**	6.9
2024–25†	(Greece) Olympiacos	GBL	18	21.1	.483	.379	.692	2.6	4.2	1.1	**.1**	4.2
2025–26†	(Greece) Olympiacos	GBL	24	20.4	.390	.342	.750	2.5	**6.1**	1.3	.0	5.6

=== College ===
Year	Team	GP	GS	MPG	FG%	3P%	FT%	RPG	APG	SPG	BPG	PPG
2011–12	Stephen F. Austin	Redshirt										
2012–13	Stephen F. Austin	32	0	18.5	.505	**.455**	.605	3.6	1.3	.8	.1	4.4
2013–14	Stephen F. Austin	**35**	**34**	28.4	.568	.359	.733	5.3	2.1	1.1	.3	13.1
2014–15	Stephen F. Austin	34	**34**	27.7	**.613**	.262	.744	6.5	3.7	1.2	.2	15.6
2015–16	Stephen F. Austin	34	**34**	**29.5**	.588	.256	**.818**	**6.9**	**4.5**	**2.1**	**.5**	**18.1**
Career		135	102	26.2	.568	.305	.759	5.6	2.9	1.3	.3	12.9

== Awards and accomplishments ==
=== Club career ===
Riesen Ludwigsburg

- FIBA Champions League Final Four Participation: (2018)

Žalgiris Kaunas

- 3× Lithuanian LKL Champion: (2019, 2020, 2021)
- 2× King Mindaugas Cup Winner: (2020, 2021)

Olympiacos

- EuroLeague Champion (2026)
- EuroLeague Finals Finalist: (2023)
- 5× EuroLeague Final Four Participation: (2022, 2023, 2024, 2025, 2026)
- 4× Greek League Champion: (2022, 2023, 2025, 2026)
- 3× Greek Cup Winner: (2022, 2023, 2024)
- 4× Greek Super Cup Winner: (2022, 2023, 2024, 2025)

=== Individual ===
- EuroLeague Best Defender: (2024)
- EuroLeague steals leader: (2023)
- Greek League Finals MVP: (2023)
- 3× Greek League Defensive Player of the Year: (2022, 2023, 2026)
- 2× Greek League All-Star: (2022, 2023)
- Lithuanian League Finals MVP: (2021)
- 3× Lithuanian League Defensive Player of the Year: (2019, 2020, 2021)
- All-Lithuanian League Team (2020)
- German League Best Defender: (2018)
- All-German League Team: (2018)
- German League All-Star: (2018)
- 2× AP Honorable Mention All-American: (2015, 2016)
- 2× Southland Player of the Year: (2015, 2016)
- 2× All-Southland First Team: (2015, 2016)
- 3× All-Southland Defensive Team: (2014, 2015, 2016)
- 3× Southland tournament MVP: (2014, 2015, 2016)
- Lou Henson Award: (2016)

== Personal life ==
Walkup was born on December 30, 1992, to Lisa and Raymond Walkup and was brought up in Pasadena, Texas. He has an older brother named Nathan who played as a forward for the Texas A&M Aggies men's basketball team from the 2007–08 season to 2010–11 season. Both players graduated at Deer Park High School and played under Coach Louis Means. Walkup has often been known for his beard, which drew the attention of several media outlets during the 2016 NCAA Tournament. Entering that year's tournament, he had not shaved since November 1, 2015. Walkup claimed that he had been asked to shave it, but he felt that it fit in with Stephen F. Austin's mascot, the Lumberjacks. His appearance has also been compared with Philadelphia Phillies baseball player Bryce Harper. He has also been nicknamed "Fresh Cut" by Barry Knight.

In September 2024, in a civil ceremony on the Greek island of Milos, Walkup married his girlfriend Estrella Nouri, a Swedish-born-and-raised model and actress of Iranian parentage.
