= Greek Basketball League Most Popular Player =

The Greek Basketball League Most Popular Player, or Greek League Most Popular Player, is an annual award for the "most popular player" of each season of Greece's top-tier level professional basketball club league, the Greek Basketball League (GBL).

== Most Popular Players ==
Most Popular Player
Season	Player	Team	Ref.
2014–15	(Greece) Vassilis Spanoulis	Olympiacos	
2015–16	(Greece) Dimitris Diamantidis	Panathinaikos	
2016–17	(Greece) Vassilis Spanoulis (2×)	Olympiacos	
2017–18	(Greece) / (United States) Nick Calathes	Panathinaikos	
2018–19	(Greece) / (United States) Nick Calathes (2×)	Panathinaikos	
2020–21	(Croatia) Mario Hezonja	Panathinaikos	
2021–22	(Bulgaria) / (Greece) Sasha Vezenkov	Olympiacos	
2022–23	(Bulgaria) / (Greece) Sasha Vezenkov (2×)	Olympiacos	
2023–24	(United States) Kendrick Nunn	Panathinaikos	
