= Joel Bolomboy =

Ukrainian-Russian-American basketball player (born 1994)

Joel Bolomboy Джоэл Боломбой
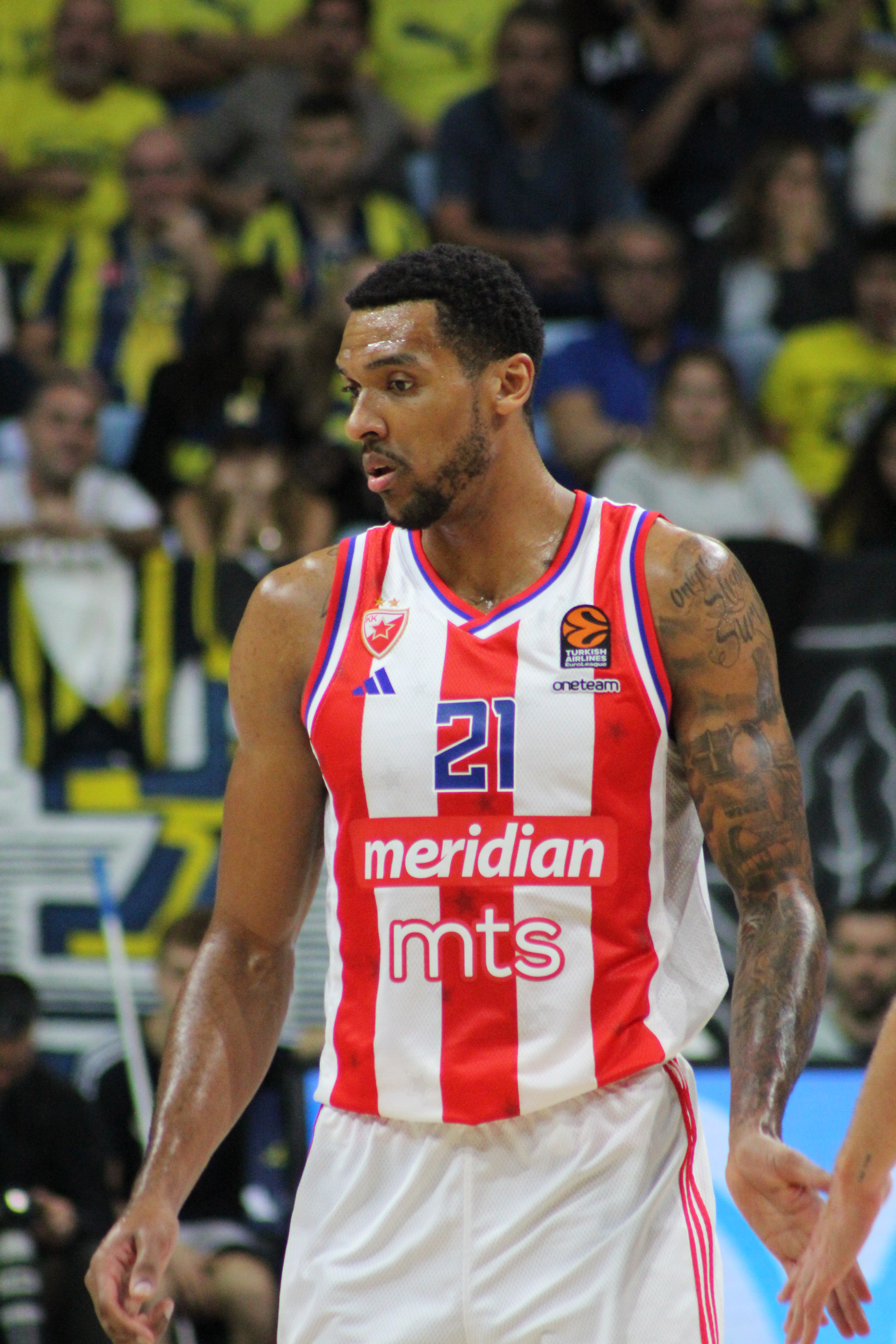
- Bolomboy with Crvena zvezda in 2024

No. 21 – ASVEL
- Position: Center / power forward
- League: LNB Élite; EuroLeague

Personal information
- Born: January 28, 1994 (age 32) Donetsk, Ukraine
- Listed height: 2.06 m (6 ft 9 in)
- Listed weight: 104 kg (229 lb)

Career information
- High school: Keller Central (Fort Worth, Texas)
- College: Weber State (2012–2016)
- NBA draft: 2016: 2nd round, 52nd overall pick
- Drafted by: Utah Jazz
- Playing career: 2016–present

Career history
- 2016–2017: Utah Jazz
- 2016–2017: →Salt Lake City Stars
- 2017–2018: Milwaukee Bucks
- 2017–2018: →Wisconsin Herd
- 2018–2022: CSKA Moscow
- 2022–2023: Olympiacos
- 2023–2026: Crvena zvezda
- 2026–present: ASVEL

Career highlights
- EuroLeague champion (2019); 2× VTB United League champion (2019, 2021); ABA League champion (2024); Serbian League champion (2024); Greek League champion (2023); Greek Cup winner (2023); 2× Serbian Cup winner (2024, 2025); Greek Supercup winner (2022); Big Sky Player of the Year (2016); First-team All-Big Sky (2016); AP Honorable Mention All-American (2016); 2× Big Sky Defensive Player of the Year (2014, 2016)
- Stats at NBA.com
- Stats at Basketball Reference

Joel Bolomboy (Russian: Джоэл Боломбой, romanized: Joel Bolomboy) (born January 28, 1994) is a Ukrainian-Russian-American professional basketball player for ASVEL of the LNB Élite and the EuroLeague. He played college basketball for the Weber State Wildcats, where he was named Big Sky Conference Player of the Year in 2016. Bolomboy was born in Ukraine but received Russian citizenship in 2018.

== Early life and college career ==
Bolomboy was born in Donetsk, Ukraine to a Congolese father and a Russian mother. The family moved to Fort Worth, Texas when Bolomboy was less than three years old. While in college, he told the Standard-Examiner that he did not "remember anything" about Ukraine and felt like he had "never been there."

He went to high school at Keller Central High School in Fort Worth, and chose Weber State for college despite interest from larger schools such as Clemson, Auburn and Florida State. During his college career, Bolomboy became the all-time leading rebounder in Weber State and Big Sky Conference history.

While always a strong rebounder, Bolomboy increased his scoring average in the 2015–16 season, averaging 17.9 points per game to go along with 12.8 rebounds per game. Following the season, Bolomboy was named first-team All-Big Sky Conference, as well as the league's Player of the Year and Defensive Player of the Year.

== Professional career ==
=== Utah Jazz (2016–2017) ===
On June 23, 2016, Bolomboy was selected by the Utah Jazz with the 52nd pick in the 2016 NBA draft. On August 19, 2016, he signed with the Jazz. He made his NBA debut on October 30, 2016, recording three points, one rebound, one assist, one steal and one block in four minutes off the bench in an 88–75 loss to the Los Angeles Clippers. During his rookie season, Bolomboy had multiple assignments with the Salt Lake City Stars, Utah's D-League affiliate. In 26 games with the Stars, he averaged 16.5 points and 13.3 rebounds per contest.

On October 16, 2017, Bolomboy was waived by the Jazz.

=== Milwaukee Bucks (2017–2018) ===
On October 20, 2017, Bolomboy signed a two-way contract with the Milwaukee Bucks via their NBA G League affiliate the Wisconsin Herd. Throughout the length of his deal, he would split his playing time between the Bucks and their G League affiliate. However, Bolomboy would be waived from the team on January 7, 2018, after signing Xavier Munford to a two-way contract of his own accord.

=== Wisconsin Herd (2018) ===
On January 10, 2018, Bolomboy re-signed with the Wisconsin Herd.

=== CSKA Moscow (2018–2022) ===
Bolomboy was signed by CSKA Moscow of the VTB United League on August 8, 2018, on a three-year deal. On March 2, 2020, he signed a two-year extension with the club.

On 28 February 2022, Bolomboy left CSKA Moscow for personal reasons related to the Russian invasion of Ukraine.

=== Olympiacos (2022–2023) ===
On 6 July 2022, Bolomboy signed a one-year deal with Olympiacos of the Greek Basket League and the Euroleague. In 35 EuroLeague matches, he averaged 3.8 points and 3 rebounds, playing around 11 minutes per contest. Additionally, in 32 domestic games, he averaged 5.6 points and 4.9 rebounds, playing around 15 minutes per contest. On July 5, 2023, he was released from the Greek club.

=== Crvena zvezda (2023–2026) ===
On 14 July 2023, Bolomboy signed a one-year contract with Crvena zvezda of the Serbian KLS, the Adriatic League and the EuroLeague.

=== ASVEL (2026–present) ===
On 11 August 2026, Bolomboy was waived by Crvena zvezda. He signed a two-year contract with LDLC ASVEL of the French LNB Élite and the EuroLeague.

== International career ==
Bolomboy was invited to try out for the Ukraine national basketball team in advance of the 2014 FIBA Basketball World Cup. He was injured while practicing for the tournament and was unable to appear in any games. He was named to the Ukrainian team's preliminary roster in advance of EuroBasket 2017 but did not appear on the final roster.

In November 2018, Bolomboy became a Russian citizen. Bolomboy played for the Russia national basketball team during the 2019 FIBA Basketball World Cup qualifiers and the EuroBasket 2022 qualifiers. He missed the 2019 FIBA Basketball World Cup due to injury.

== Career statistics ==
Legend
GP	Games played	GS	Games started	MPG	Minutes per game
FG%	Field-goal percentage	3P%	3-point field-goal percentage	FT%	Free-throw percentage
RPG	Rebounds per game	APG	Assists per game	SPG	Steals per game
BPG	Blocks per game	PPG	Points per game	PIR	Performance index rating
**Bold**	Career high

=== NBA ===
==== Regular season ====
Year	Team	GP	GS	MPG	FG%	3P%	FT%	RPG	APG	SPG	BPG	PPG
2016–17	Utah	**12**	0	4.4	**.563**	**.250**	**.500**	1.4	**.2**	.1	**.2**	**1.8**
2017–18	Milwaukee	6	0	**6.3**	.500	.000	**.500**	**1.7**	—	**.3**	—	1.5
Career		18	0	5.1	.545	.200	.500	1.5	.1	.2	.1	1.7

==== Playoffs ====
Year	Team	GP	GS	MPG	FG%	3P%	FT%	RPG	APG	SPG	BPG	PPG
2017	Utah	2	0	4.5	.667	—	—	1.0	—	—	.5	2.0
Career		2	0	4.5	.667	—	—	1.0	—	—	.5	2.0

=== EuroLeague ===
†	Denotes seasons in which Bolomboy won the EuroLeague

Year	Team	GP	GS	MPG	FG%	3P%	FT%	RPG	APG	SPG	BPG	PPG	PIR
2018–19†	CSKA Moscow	28	5	9.3	.538	.462	.600	1.9	.4	.1	.3	2.6	2.9
2019–20	CSKA Moscow	27	1	16.9	.478	.325	.743	4.0	.5	.3	.4	5.4	7.6
2020–21	CSKA Moscow	25	9	16.9	.559	.250	.771	3.8	.3	.6	.5	5.4	7.2
2021–22	CSKA Moscow	23	4	15.7	.528	.261	.750	4.1	.3	.3	**.7**	5.9	7.7
2022–23	Olympiacos	**35**	1	11.3	.600	**.500**	.674	3.0	.5	.2	.3	3.8	5.4
2023–24	Crvena zvezda	33	**31**	**25.5**	**.616**	.333	**.812**	**6.0**	**.8**	**.8**	**.7**	**10.2**	**14.6**
Career		171	51	16.0	.562	.325	.748	3.8	.5	.4	.5	5.6	7.7

=== Domestic leagues ===
Year	Team	League	GP	MPG	FG%	3P%	FT%	RPG	APG	SPG	BPG	PPG
2016–17	(United States) Salt Lake City Stars	D-League	24	34.5	.540	.457	.705	13.2	1.8	.6	1.2	16.4
2017–18	(United States) Wisconsin Herd	G League	30	33.2	.558	.313	.800	9.6	1.1	.8	.7	16.3
2018–19	(Russia) CSKA Moscow	VTBUL	26	16.2	.640	.333	.771	4.3	.5	.3	.5	7.1
2019–20	(Russia) CSKA Moscow	VTBUL	17	19.9	.607	.455	.682	4.0	.3	.5	.5	8.3
2020–21	(Russia) CSKA Moscow	VTBUL	20	19.3	.545	.318	.789	3.9	.3	.4	.9	8.7
2021–22	(Russia) CSKA Moscow	VTBUL	15	18.9	.603	.476	.842	3.6	.3	.5	.4	7.2
2022–23	(Greece) Olympiacos	HEBA A1	30	14.2	.610	.333	.720	4.7	1.1	.3	.7	5.3
2023–24	(Serbia) Crvena zvezda	KLS	1	7.0	1.000	1.000	—	3.0	—	—	2.0	5.0
2023–24	(Serbia) Crvena zvezda	ABA	28	18.3	.633	.222	.696	4.1	1.0	.5	.8	6.9

=== College ===
Year	Team	GP	GS	MPG	FG%	3P%	FT%	RPG	APG	SPG	BPG	PPG
2012–13	Weber State	**37**	0	21.7	**.578**	—	.695	7.1	.4	.4	**1.7**	7.0
2013–14	Weber State	30	28	30.1	.488	**1.000**	.729	11.0	.6	.5	.8	8.7
2014–15	Weber State	30	29	**33.2**	.473	.366	**.735**	10.2	.8	**.7**	**1.7**	13.3
2015–16	Weber State	33	**33**	31.5	.573	.364	.697	**12.6**	**1.1**	**.7**	1.2	**17.1**
Career		130	90	28.8	.528	.371	.713	10.1	.7	.6	1.4	11.4
