= Greek Basketball League Most Improved Player =

The Greek Basketball League Most Improved Player, or Greek League Most Improved Player, is an annual award for the Most Improved Player of each season of Greece's top-tier level professional basketball club league, the Greek Basket League (GBL).

== Winners ==
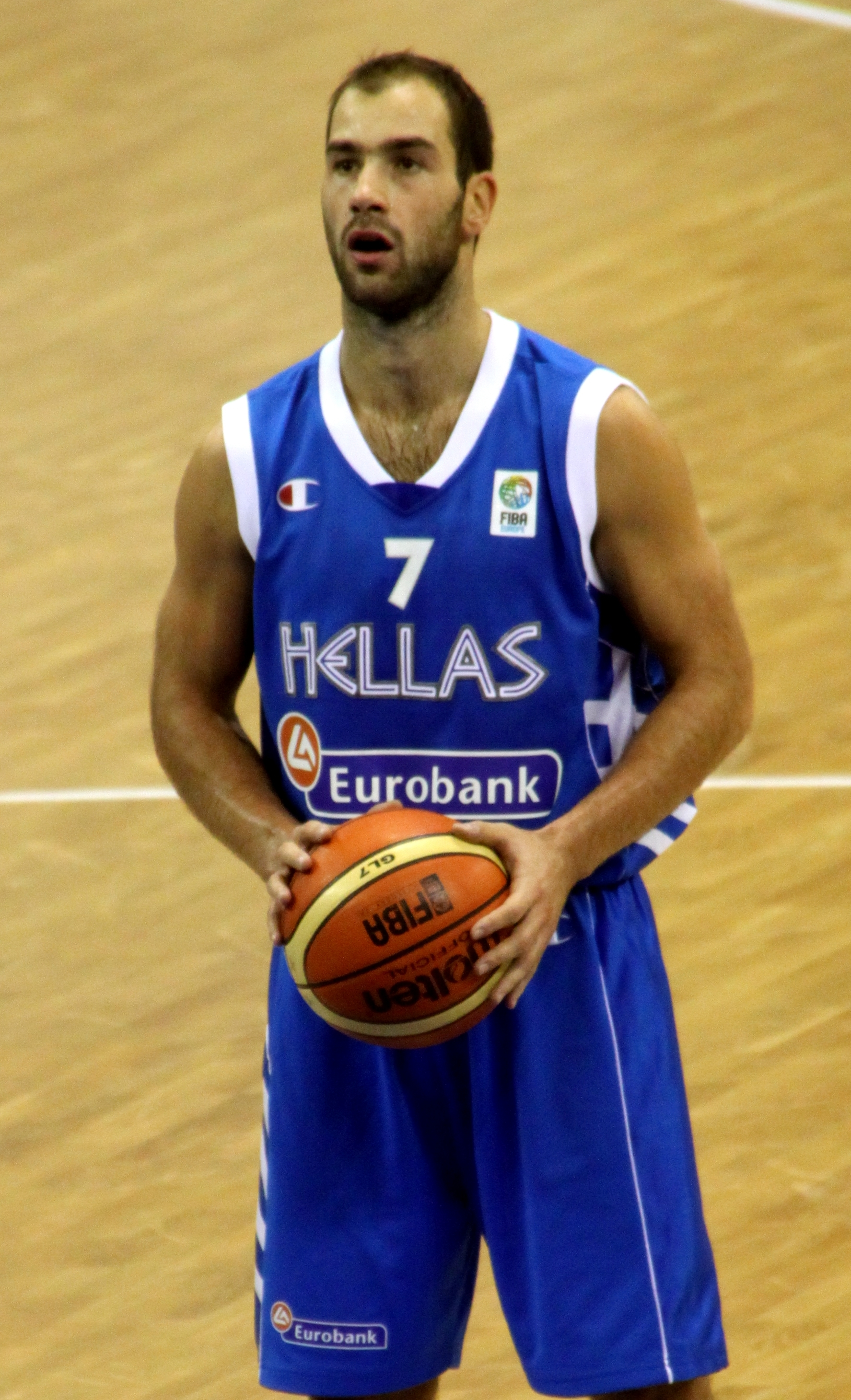
Vassilis Spanoulis was the Greek League Most Improved Player in 2004.

Season	Most Improved Player	Club	Ref.
2003–04	(Greece) Vassilis Spanoulis	Maroussi	
2005–06	(Greece) Loukas Mavrokefalidis	PAOK	
2009–10	(Greece) Kostas Kaimakoglou	Maroussi	
2010–11	(Greece) / (United States) Nick Calathes	Panathinaikos	
2011–12	(Greece) Giorgos Printezis	Olympiacos	
2012–13	(Greece) / (Serbia) Vlado Janković	Panionios	
2013–14	(Greece) Georgios Bogris	PAOK	
2014–15	(Bulgaria) / (Greece) Sasha Vezenkov	Aris	
2015–16	(Greece) Leonidas Kaselakis	Nea Kifissia	
2016–17	(Serbia) Nikola Milutinov	Olympiacos	
2017–18	(Greece) Christos Saloustros	Promitheas Patras	
2018–19	(Greece) Dimitris Kaklamanakis	Lavrio	
2019–20	Cancelled due to COVID-19		
2020–21	(Greece) Vassilis Mouratos	Lavrio	
2021–22	(Bulgaria) / (Greece) Sasha Vezenkov (2×)	Olympiacos	
2022–23	(Greece) Lefteris Mantzoukas	Panathinaikos	
2023–24	(Greece) Vassilis Toliopoulos	Aris	
2024–25	(Greece) Neoklis Avdalas	Karditsa	
2025–26	(Greece) Tyler Dorsey	Olympiacos	
