= 2021–22 Greek Basketball Cup =

2021–22 Greek Cup
- Season: 2021–22
- Duration: 4 September 2021–20 February 2022
- Teams: 29

Finals
- Champions: Olympiacos (10th title)
- Runners-up: Panathinaikos OPAP
- Finals MVP: (United States) (Greece) Tyler Dorsey

Statistical leaders
Points	(Bulgaria) Sasha Vezenkov	16.5
Rebounds	(Bulgaria) Sasha Vezenkov	9.0
Assists	(Spain) Quino Colom	12.0

The 2021–22 Greek Basketball Cup was the 47th edition of Greek top-tier level professional domestic basketball cup competition. The previous winner of the cup was Panathinaikos. The cup competition started on 4 September 2021 and ended on 20 February 2022. Olympiacos won the competition.

== Format ==
The top six placed teams from the top-tier level Greek Basket League's 2020–21 season, gained an automatic bye to the 2021–22 Greek Cup quarterfinals. While the seven lower-placed teams from the 2020–21 Greek Basket League season also gained an automatic bye to the 2021–22 Greek Cup phase two, competing for two quarterfinals spots with phase one winners. All sixteen teams from the second-tier level Greek A2 Basket League's 2020–21 season will start from phase one, competing for one spot in phase two of the cup. All rounds were played under a single elimination format.

== Preliminary rounds ==
=== Phase 1 ===
==== Round 1 ====
Psychiko	60 – 64	Panerythraikos
Triton Athens	69 – 79	Maroussi
Amyntas	101 – 52	Pagrati
Filippos Verias	72 – 84	Karditsa
Eleftheroupolis	81 – 87	Kavala
AO Agrinio	58 – 86	Charilaos Trikoupis
Oiakas Nafpliou	55 – 102	Koroivos Amaliadas

==== Round 2 ====
GS Dafni Dafniou	43 – 100	Maroussi
Amyntas	70 – 68	Panerythraikos
Karditsa	76 – 71	Kavala
Koroivos Amaliadas	75 – 60	Charilaos Trikoupis

==== Round 3 ====
Amyntas	66 – 58	Koroivos Amaliadas
Maroussi	83 – 70	Karditsa

==== Round 4 ====
Maroussi	75 – 60	Amyntas

=== Phase 2 ===
==== Round 1 ====
Ionikos Nikaias	76 – 69	Apollon Patras
Kolossos Rodou	67 – 94	Olympiacos
Larissa	68 – 67	Aris
Maroussi	65 – 76	Iraklis

==== Round 2 ====
Ionikos Nikaias	74 – 66	Larissa
Iraklis	55 – 90	Olympiacos

== Final rounds ==
Quarterfinals; 26 December 2021; 5 February 2022
Olympiacos	110
Ionikos Nikaias	85
AEK	90
Peristeri	77
Panathinaikos OPAP	93
Lavrio	69
Promitheas	100
PAOK	86

Semifinals; 18 February 2022
Olympiacos	76
AEK	70
Panathinaikos OPAP	85
Promitheas	68

Final; 20 February 2022
Olympiacos	81
Panathinaikos OPAP	73

== Final ==
20 February 2022	Olympiacos	81–73	Panathinaikos
16:00 (CET)	Scoring by quarter: 21–17, 18–28, 19–22, 23–6
	Pts: Dorsey 21; Vezenkov 18; Rebs: Vezenkov 13; Fall 6 Asts: Sloukas 5	Boxscore	Pts: Nedovic 23; White 15; Rebs: Papagiannis 12; Asts: Nedovic 5	Arena: Heraklion Indoor Sports Arena

== Awards ==
=== Finals Most Valuable Player ===
Player	Team
(United States) (Greece) Tyler Dorsey	Olympiacos

=== Finals Top Scorer ===
Player	Team
(Serbia) Nemanja Nedović	Panathinaikos
