= Aleksandar Vezenkov =

Cypriot-Greek-Bulgarian basketball player (born 1995)

Sasha Vezenkov
- Vezenkov with Olympiacos in 2026

No. 14 – Olympiacos
- Position: Power forward
- League: GBL; EuroLeague

Personal information
- Born: 6 August 1995 (age 31) Nicosia, Cyprus
- Listed height: 2.06 m (6 ft 9 in)
- Listed weight: 102 kg (225 lb)

Career information
- NBA draft: 2017: 2nd round, 57th overall pick
- Drafted by: Brooklyn Nets
- Playing career: 2011–present

Career history
- 2011–2015: Aris Thessaloniki
- 2015–2018: FC Barcelona
- 2018–2023: Olympiacos
- 2023–2024: Sacramento Kings
- 2024–present: Olympiacos

Career highlights
- EuroLeague champion (2026); 2× EuroLeague MVP (2023, 2026); 4× All-EuroLeague First Team (2022, 2023, 2025, 2026); EuroLeague Playoffs MVP (2025); 2× Alphonso Ford EuroLeague Top Scorer Trophy (2023, 2026); 4× Greek League champion (2022, 2023, 2025, 2026); 2× Greek Cup winner (2022, 2023); 4× Greek Super Cup winner (2022, 2024–2026); 4× Greek League MVP (2015, 2022, 2023, 2025); 2× Greek League Finals MVP (2022, 2025); 5× All-Greek League Team (2015, 2022, 2023, 2025, 2026); 2× Greek League Top Scorer (2015, 2025); 2× Greek League Most Improved Player (2015, 2022); 3× Greek League Best Young Player (2013–2015); 2× Greek League Most Popular Player (2022, 2023); Greek All-Star (2022); Greek All-Star Game MVP (2022); Greek Cup Finals MVP (2023); 2× Greek Super Cup Finals MVP (2024, 2026); Spanish Cup winner (2018); Spanish Supercup winner (2015); All-Liga ACB Young Team (2017); 2× Bulgarian Athlete of the Year (2022, 2023)
- Stats at NBA.com
- Stats at Basketball Reference

Aleksandar Vezenkov (Bulgarian: Александър Везенков; Greek: Αλέξανδρος Βεζένκοφ; born 6 August 1995), most commonly known as Sasha Vezenkov, nicknamed as Sasha (Bulgarian: Саша Везенков; Greek: Σάσα Βεζένκοφ), is a Bulgarian professional basketball player for Olympiacos of the Greek Basketball League (GBL) and the EuroLeague.

Standing at 2.06 m (6 ft 9 in), Vezenkov is a stretch power forward. A four-time All-EuroLeague First Team selection, he was elected EuroLeague MVP twice in the 2022–23 and 2025–26 seasons.

== Early career ==
Vezenkov was born in Nicosia to Bulgarian parents and was raised in Cyprus and Greece. He holds triple citizenship for Bulgaria, Cyprus and Greece.

Vezenkov, who was always considered to be one of the best youth players in Europe in his age group, began playing youth club basketball in Cyprus in 2005 with APOEL Nicosia's youth teams. In 2009, at the age of 14, he moved to Greece and began playing youth club basketball with Aris' youth teams, until 2011, when he joined Aris' senior men's club. He trained for several years at Nick Galis Hall, located near the center of Thessaloniki, Greece.

On 16 May 2013, Vezenkov committed to play American college basketball in the Big East Conference, at Xavier University, with the Xavier Musketeers. However, he ultimately decided to stay in Greece with his club team Aris instead.

== Professional career ==
=== Aris (2011–2015) ===
Vezenkov began his pro career with the senior men's team of Aris, in the Greek League, in 2011, appearing in 10 games, with an average of 2.5 minutes on the floor. In the 2012–13 season, he appeared in 21 games, averaging 3.9 points and 2.5 rebounds per game. He was named the Greek League Best Young Player in 2013.

In August 2013, he re-signed with Aris for 3 years. In the next season, he established himself in the team, appeared in 26 games and averaged 11.1 points, 5.8 rebounds, 2.1 assists, and 0.9 steals per game. He was named the Greek League Best Young Player again in 2014. In the local derby against rivals PAOK, during the 2014–15 season, Vezenkov achieved Greek League career-highs in scoring and rebounding, with 29 points and 14 rebounds respectively.

During 26 regular season games, Vezenkov led the league in total points scored, with 469, and was second in total rebounds grabbed, with 201. In total, he played in 37 games during the 2014–15 Greek Basket League season, averaging 16.8 points, 7.3 rebounds, and 1.6 assists per game. He was the league's official full-season leader in scoring and rebounding. He was also named the league's MVP, Most Improved Player, and Best Young Player that season. Vezenkov had originally planned to enter the 2015 NBA draft, but later withdrew his name from it before the deadline that was set for international players in June.

=== Barcelona (2015–2018) ===
On 31 July 2015, Vezenkov signed a four-year deal (with the 4th year being optional) worth €2 million net income, with the Spanish ACB League club FC Barcelona. FC Barcelona also paid a €315,000 buyout fee to Vezenkov's former club, Aris. Vezenkov's contract with FC Barcelona also included a buyout option for the NBA, set at the amount of €1 million. The Spanish League club Valencia Basket, and the Greek League club Panathinaikos, were also interested in signing Vezenkov to a contract at the time. Vezenkov would then put his name in the 2016 NBA draft, after his first season with Barcelona ended. However, he ultimately removed his name from the draft on the 13 June 2016, the deadline for international players.

With Barcelona, Vezenkov won the Spanish Supercup title in 2015, and was named to the all Spanish League All-Young Players Team of the 2016–17 season. On 29 June 2018, Barcelona parted ways with him.

=== Olympiacos (2018–2023) ===
On 12 July 2018, Vezenkov signed a two-year deal with Olympiacos of the EuroLeague.

On 10 July 2020, Vezenkov signed a two-year extension with the team. He recorded his EuroLeague career-high on 18 March 2021, scoring 31 points in an 80–84 win at Alba Berlin.

In the 2021–22 season, Vezenkov established himself as a regular starter at Olympiacos. On 20 February 2022, he recorded 18 points and 13 rebounds in the Greek Cup Final against arch-rivals Panathinaikos, helping the club win its first title after 6 years. He was also named EuroLeague February MVP, playing an important role in Olympiacos finishing second in the Euroleague Regular Season with a 19–9 record, the club's best ever finish. On 27 April 2022, he scored 17 points and grabbed 9 rebounds in the 83–87 road win, in Game 3 of the playoff series against Monaco, helping his team regain homecourt advantage and eventually qualify for the EuroLeague Final Four, for the first time since 2017. He finished the EuroLeague season averaging 13.7 points, 5.9 rebounds and a Performance Index Rating of 17.8. His performance earned him a spot in the All-EuroLeague First Team. On 17 June 2022, in Game 3 of the Greek League Finals against Panathinaikos, he recorded 25 points, 6 rebounds and 3 assists, with Olympiacos completing the domestic Double, having swept their rivals.

Vezenkov won the Bulgarian Sportsperson of the Year award in 2022, which made him the second basketball player to win the award after Vanya Voynova in 1958.

In the 2022–23 EuroLeague season, Vezenkov was chosen as the EuroLeague MVP and won the Alphonso Ford EuroLeague Top Scorer Trophy, which made him only the second player to win both accolades in the same season, after Nando de Colo in 2016. In 40 EuroLeague games, he averaged 17.6 points (66% from the field, 38% from beyond the arc, 88% from the free throw line), 6.8 rebounds, 1.9 assists, with a 21.5 PIR (Performance Index Rating), playing around 29 minutes per contest.

=== Sacramento Kings (2023–2024) ===
On 22 June 2017, Vezenkov was selected with the 57th overall pick in the 2017 NBA draft by the Brooklyn Nets. On 14 January 2021, the Cleveland Cavaliers acquired his draft rights from the Nets in a multi-team trade involving James Harden. On 23 June 2022, his rights were traded to the Sacramento Kings for the 49th pick in the 2022 draft, which was used to pick Isaiah Mobley.

On 18 July 2023, Vezenkov signed a three-year, $20 million deal with the Kings. He played one season with the Kings, averaging 12 minutes per game and 5.4 points per game.

On 28 June 2024, Vezenkov, Davion Mitchell, the draft rights to Jamal Shead, and a 2025 second-round draft pick were traded to the Toronto Raptors in exchange for Jalen McDaniels. On 22 July 2024, he was bought out by the Raptors before being waived.

=== Second stint with Olympiacos (2024–present) ===
On 25 July 2024, Vezenkov returned to Olympiacos of the Greek Basket League. On 31 October, he received a Hoops Agents Player of the Week award for Round 6. Vezenkov had 23 points, eight rebounds, and two assists.

On January 10, 2025, Vezenkov recorded his career-high performance, scoring 45 points against Bayern Munich. On February 6, he named the Most Valuable Player of Round 25 of the 2024-2025 Turkish Airlines Euroleague Regular Season. Vezenkov had 23 points in the game. At the end of the season, Sasha Vezenkov was named Euroleague Playoff MVP.

With Olympiacos, Vezenkov won the EuroLeague title in 2026, and was named Euroleague MVP of the 2025–2026 season.

On October 17, 2026, he was named the EuroLeague Regular Season Round 6 MVP following a dominant performance against FC Barcelona Bàsquet. He had 25 points, 6 rebounds, and 1 assist. This is the 18th of his career.

== National team career ==
=== Junior national team ===
Vezenkov was a member of the Bulgarian junior national teams. With Bulgaria's junior national teams, he played at the following tournaments: the 2010 FIBA Europe Under-16 Championship, the 2011 FIBA Europe Under-16 Championship, the 2012 FIBA Europe Under-18 Championship, the 2012 FIBA Europe Under-20 Division B Championship, and the 2013 FIBA Europe Under-18 Championship. He led the 2011 FIBA Europe Under-16 Championship in scoring, with an average of 27.1 points per game.

He led the 2013 FIBA Europe Under-18 Championship in scoring, with an average of 22.4 points per game. He also led the 2014 FIBA Europe Under-20 Championship in scoring, averaging 19.3 points per game, and rebounds, averaging 11.2 rebounds per game. He was also named to the tournament's All-Tournament Team.

=== Senior national team ===
Vezenkov represented the senior men's Bulgarian national team in the second qualification tournament for FIBA EuroBasket 2015, averaging 17.3 points per game, and also being the highest scoring player for the team, in 5 of their 6 games, as well as the team's overall top scorer. He also played at the EuroBasket 2017 qualification as well as the team's successful qualification for EuroBasket 2022 and the actual tournament, during which he was the leading scorer for Bulgaria.

== Club career statistics ==
Legend
GP	Games played	GS	Games started	MPG	Minutes per game
FG%	Field-goal percentage	3P%	3-point field-goal percentage	FT%	Free-throw percentage
RPG	Rebounds per game	APG	Assists per game	SPG	Steals per game
BPG	Blocks per game	PPG	Points per game	PIR	Performance index rating
**Bold**	Career high

=== NBA stats ===
==== Regular season ====
Year	Team	GP	GS	MPG	FG%	3P%	FT%	RPG	APG	SPG	BPG	PPG
2023–24	Sacramento	42	0	12.2	.440	.375	.800	2.3	.5	.5	.2	5.4
Career		42	0	12.2	.440	.375	.800	2.3	.5	.5	.2	5.4

=== EuroLeague stats ===
†	Denotes season in which Vezenkov won the EuroLeague
*	Led the league

Year	Team	GP	GS	MPG	FG%	3P%	FT%	RPG	APG	SPG	BPG	PPG	PIR
2015–16	Barcelona	22	1	8.9	.457	.444	**1.000**	1.2	.3	.2	.0	2.7	2.6
2016–17	Barcelona	30	6	18.4	**.577**	**.479**	.848	3.2	1.1	.7	.2	7.5	9.7
2017–18	Barcelona	13	1	11.4	.429	.222	.923	2.5	.5	.4	.1	3.5	5.2
2018–19	Olympiacos	28	3	10.2	.488	.207	.810	2.2	.4	.4	.1	3.8	4.8
2019–20	Olympiacos	26	3	13.4	.540	.459	.808	2.0	.5	.3	.2	7.1	6.9
2020–21	Olympiacos	31	13	23.3	.463	.430	.887	5.4	1.1	.7	**.5**	11.5	14.8
2021–22	Olympiacos	38	38*	30.1	.530	.370	.833	5.9	1.5	**1.0**	.2	13.7	17.8
2022–23	Olympiacos	**40**	**39**	29.1	.536	.378	.879	**6.8**	**1.9**	.9	.1	17.6*	21.5*
2024–25	Olympiacos	38	38	**30.2**	.542	.382	.886	6.6	1.8	.9	.2	**19.8**	**23.7***
2025–26†	Olympiacos	39	**39**	27.5	.541	.405	.890	6.4	1.3	.6	.1	19.0*	22.1*
2026–27	Olympiacos	12	12	27.8	.591	.375	.879	6.1	1.0	.7	.1	20.7	24.7
Career		317	193	22.6	.531	.393	.874	4.8	1.2	.7	.2	12.4	15.1

=== Domestic leagues stats ===
†	Denotes season in which Vezenkov won the Greek Basketball League championship

Year	Team	League	GP	MPG	FG%	3P%	FT%	RPG	APG	SPG	BPG	PPG
2011–12	(Greece) Aris	HEBA A1	9	2.7	.333	.000	.000	.2	.2	.1	.0	.4
2012–13	(Greece) Aris	GBL	21	13.8	.440	.261	.750	2.5	.8	.5	.0	3.9
2013–14	(Greece) Aris	GBL	26	27.9	.495	.385	.756	5.8	**2.1**	.8	.2	11.1
2014–15	(Greece) Aris	GBL	37	**32.4**	.479	.387	.775	**7.2**	1.7	**1.1**	.3	16.8
2015–16	(Spain) Barcelona	ACB	**43**	13.2	.482	.350	.793	2.5	.2	.1	.1	4.3
2016–17	(Spain) Barcelona	ACB	35	18.8	.528	.356	**.843**	3.1	.8	.5	.3	8.7
2017–18	(Spain) Barcelona	ACB	21	15.4	.538	.429	.714	3.3	.9	.4	**.5**	6.9
2018–19	(Greece) Olympiacos	GBL	23	18.9	.526	.381	.813	4.8	1.1	.5	.2	7.9
2021–22†	(Greece) Olympiacos	GBL	29	24.0	.569	**.434**	.807	7.1	1.9	.9	.4	15.5
2022–23†	(Greece) Olympiacos	GBL	30	23.6	.580	.394	.803	5.7	2.0	1.0	.3	16.7
2024–25†	(Greece) Olympiacos	GBL	27	25.5	**.639**	.394	.826	6.1	2.0	.9	.2	**18.4**
2025–26†	(Greece) Olympiacos	GBL	26	24.8	.572	.301	.848	4.8	1.7	.8	.3	16.4

== Bulgaria national team career statistics ==
Year	Tournament	National Team	GP	GS	MPG	FG%	3P%	FT%	RPG	APG	SPG	BPG	PPG
2015	EuroBasket QT	Bulgaria Men	6	6	34.0	.506	.371	.722	6.3	1.5	1.2	.2	17.3
2017	EuroBasket QT	Bulgaria Men	4	4	35.8	.440	.357	.933	4.3	3.3	1.8	.3	17.0
2018	World Cup QT	Bulgaria Men	5	5	34.4	.397	.355	.821	8.2	2.0	.8	.6	16.8
2019	World Cup QT	Bulgaria Men	2	2	35.5	.367	.308	.625	10.0	1.5	.5	1.0	15.5
2022	World Cup QT	Bulgaria Men	1	1	38.0	.478	.333	.800	11.0	2.0	2.0	.0	29.0
2022	EuroBasket	Bulgaria Men	5	5	37.0	.495	.400	.929	12.2	2.2	.8	.2	26.8

=== Youth National Team ===
Year	Tournament	National Team	GP	GS	MPG	FG%	3P%	FT%	RPG	APG	SPG	BPG	PPG
2011	U16 EuroBasket	. Bulgaria Under-16	9	9	37.7	.536	.429	.773	9.9	3.6	1.8	1.8	27.1
2013	U18 EuroBasket	. Bulgaria Under-18	8	8	38.0	.475	.404	.787	9.5	2.9	1.5	.5	22.4
2014	U20 EuroBasket	. Bulgaria Under-20	9	9	35.9	.454	.264	.762	11.2	2.6	1.0	.0	19.3

== Awards and accomplishments ==
=== Titles won ===
- EuroLeague Champion 2026 (with Olympiacos Piraeus)
- 4× Greek League Champion: 2022, 2023, 2025, 2026 (with Olympiacos Piraeus)
- 3× Catalan League Champion: 2015, 2016, 2017 (with FC Barcelona)
- 2× Greek Cup Winner: 2022, 2023 (with Olympiacos Piraeus)
- Spanish Cup Winner: 2018 (with FC Barcelona)
- 4× Greek Super Cup Winner: 2022, 2024, 2025, 2026 (with Olympiacos Piraeus)
- Spanish Supercup Winner: 2015 (with FC Barcelona)

=== Other honors ===
- EuroLeague Final Runner-up: 2023 (with Olympiacos Piraeus)
- 4× EuroLeague Final Four Participation: 2022, 2023, 2025, 2026 (with Olympiacos Piraeus)
- EuroLeague SuperCup Runner-up: 2026 (with Olympiacos Piraeus)
- Liga ACB Runner-up: 2016 (with FC Barcelona)
- 3× Greek Cup Runner-up: 2014 (with Aris Thessaloniki), 2025, 2026 (with Olympiacos Piraeus)
- Spanish Supercup Runner-up: 2016 (with FC Barcelona)

=== Individual awards and accomplishments ===
==== European awards ====
- 2× EuroLeague MVP: 2023, 2026
- 4× All-EuroLeague First Team: 2022, 2023, 2025, 2026
- 2× Alphonso Ford EuroLeague Top Scorer Trophy: 2023, 2026
- EuroLeague Playoffs MVP: 2025
- 3× EuroLeague PIR Leader: 2023, 2025, 2026
- EuroLeague Championship Game Top Scorer: 2023
- 5× EuroLeague MVP of the Month: February 2022, November 2022, February 2023, January 2025, January 2026
- 19× EuroLeague MVP of the Round
- 3× NBA Best Player in the World Outside of the NBA: 2024, 2025, 2026
- 4× Eurobasket.com's All-Europe First Team: 2022, 2023, 2024, 2025
- BasketNews.com's All-EuroLeague Best Player: 2024
- 2× Eurobasket.com's All-EuroLeague Player of the Year: 2023, 2026
- 3× Eurobasket.com's All-EuroLeague European Player of the Year: 2023, 2025, 2026
- 3× Eurobasket.com's All-EuroLeague Forward of the Year: 2023, 2025, 2026

==== Domestic awards ====
- 4× Greek League MVP: 2015, 2022, 2023, 2025
- 2× Greek League Finals MVP: 2022, 2025
- 5× All-Greek League Team: 2015, 2022, 2023, 2025, 2026
- 2× Greek League Top Scorer: 2015, 2025
- 3× Greek League Full Season Top Scorer: 2015, 2022, 2025
- 4× Greek League PIR Leader: 2015, 2022, 2023, 2025
- 4× Greek League Full Season RIP Leader: 2015, 2022, 2023, 2025
- Greek League Full Season Rebounding Leader: 2015
- Greek All-Star MVP: 2022
- Greek All-Star: 2022
- 2× Greek League Most Popular Player: 2022, 2023
- 2× Greek League Most Improved Player: 2015, 2022
- 3× Greek League Best Young Player: 2013, 2014, 2015
- Greek Cup Finals MVP: 2023
- 2× Greek Cup Finals Top Scorer: 2025, 2026
- 2× Greek Super Cup Finals MVP: 2024, 2026
- 3× Greek Super Cup Finals Top Scorer: 2022, 2024, 2026
- 14× Greek League MVP of the Week
- 4× Eurobasket.com's All-Greek League Player of the Year: 2022, 2023, 2025, 2026
- 5× Eurobasket.com's All-Greek League Forward of the Year: 2015, 2022, 2023, 2025, 2026
- 2× Eurobasket.com's All-Greek League Defensive Player of the Year: 2025, 2026
- 2× Eurobasket com's All-Greek League Bosman Player of the Year: 2025, 2026
- 2× Greek Youth All-Star Game: 2013, 2014
- All-Liga ACB Youth Team: 2017
- Panhellenic Youth Championship MVP: 2011
- Panhellenic Youth Championship Top Scorer: 2011
- All-Panhellenic Youth Championship Team: 2011
- 2× Best Young Basketball Player of Bulgaria: 2013–14, 2014–15
- Second place in the Viasport.bg "Best Young Sportsperson of Bulgaria" rankings: 2014
- Bulgarian Athlete of the Year: 2022, 2023

==== Club team awards ====
- Olympiacos Piraeus' All-Time EuroLeague RIP Leader
- Olympiacos Piraeus' All-Time EuroLeague Top Scorer
- He holds the record for the most PIR in the history of Olympiacos Piraeus in one game in the EuroLeague with 52 PIR.
- He holds the record for the most points in the history of Olympiacos Piraeus in one game in the EuroLeague with 45 points.

==== Bulgarian national team tournaments awards ====
- EuroBasket rebounding leader: 2022

==== Bulgarian youth national team tournaments awards ====
- All-U20 EuroBasket Team: 2014
- U20 EuroBasket rebounding leader: 2014
- U20 EuroBasket Top Scorer: 2014
- U16 EuroBasket Top Scorer: 2011
- U18 EuroBasket Top Scorer: 2013

== Personal life ==
Vezenkov is the son of Yanka Vezenkova (née Gerginova) and Sashko "Sasho" Vezenkov, who has served as both head coach and director of sports of Lukoil Academic. He is also a former international basketball player, who played at EuroBasket 1985, EuroBasket 1989, and EuroBasket 1991. Sasho was also the captain of the senior men's Bulgarian national basketball team. Sasho moved to Cyprus in account of his signing with 3-times Champions, PAEEK Kyrenia B.C., after he played and coached basketball there in the Cypriot Basketball League for many years.

Vezenkov's older sister, Michaela Vezenkova, played college basketball at UNC Wilmington, and also played professionally in the Cypriot women's league. Vezenkova decided to represent Cyprus, rather than Bulgaria, and she eventually became the captain of the Cypriot women's national basketball team.

While living in Cyprus as a youth, Vezenkov attended Greek schools. He is fluent in both Greek and Bulgarian.

Vezenkov officially received Greek citizenship on 30 December 2015, under the official name of Alexander "Alex" Vezenkof (Greek: Αλεξάντερ "Αλέξ" Βεζένκοφ), with his common Greek name being Sasha Vezenkof (Greek: Σάσα Βεζένκοφ). Before acquiring Greek citizenship, Vezenkov had gone on record to say that he felt like a member of Greek society, since he was born and raised in Greek communities in both Cyprus and Greece. He was in a relationship with Greek waterpolo player Nikoleta Eleftheriadou; the couple separated in December 2025.

In July 2026, Vezenkov earned his master's degree from National Sports Academy "Vasil Levski" with the ultimate goal of becoming a basketball coach.
