= 2022–23 EuroLeague =

European basketball competition

2022–23 Turkish Airlines EuroLeague^{1}
- Season: 2022–23
- Duration: 6 October 2022 – 14 April 2023 (Regular season); 25 April 2023 – 10 May 2023 (Playoffs); 19 May 2023 – 21 May 2023 (Final Four)
- Games played: 328
- Teams: 18

Regular season
- Top seed: (Greece) Olympiacos
- Season MVP: (Bulgaria) Sasha Vezenkov

Final Four
- Champions: (Spain) Real Madrid (11th title)
- Runners-up: (Greece) Olympiacos
- Third place: (France) AS Monaco
- Fourth place: (Spain) Barcelona
- Final Four MVP: (Cape Verde) Edy Tavares

Statistical leaders
Points	(Bulgaria) Sasha Vezenkov	17.6
Rebounds	(France) Mathias Lessort	7.1
Assists	(United States) Darius Thompson	6.7
Index Rating	(Bulgaria) Sasha Vezenkov	21.5

Records
- Biggest home win: Olympiacos 117–71 Virtus Bologna (9 December 2022)
- Biggest away win: ALBA Berlin 60–93 Olympiacos (8 February 2023)
- Highest scoring: Baskonia 114–111 Anadolu Efes (27 January 2023)
- Winning streak: 7 games Olympiacos
- Losing streak: 13 games ASVEL
- Highest attendance: 20,091; Partizan 80–82 Real Madrid (2 May 2023)
- Lowest attendance: 2,340; Panathinaikos 86–76 Bayern Munich (28 March 2023)
- Attendance: 2,909,769 (8,871 per game)
- All statistics correct as of 21 May 2023.^{1} Sponsored league name, referring to Turkish Airlines.

The 2022–23 Turkish Airlines EuroLeague was the 23rd season of the modern era of the EuroLeague, and the 13th under the title sponsorship of Turkish Airlines. Including the competition's previous incarnation as the FIBA Europe Champions Cup, it was the 66th season of the premier basketball competition for European men's clubs.

For a second straight season, CSKA Moscow had their EuroLeague license rescinded for the season following the Russian invasion of Ukraine.

Real Madrid returned to the final after losing to Anadolu Efes the previous year to claim a record-extending eleventh title against Olympiacos at the Žalgirio Arena in Kaunas, ending a five-year drought since their last triumph in 2018. Madrid's Sergio Llull scored the winning shot with 3.1 seconds left on the clock in the championship game. Anadolu Efes were the defending champions, having won two straight titles, but were eliminated after finishing eleventh in the regular season.

== Team allocation ==
=== Distribution ===
The following is the access list for this season.

Access list for 2022–23 EuroLeague
	Teams entering in this round	Teams advancing from previous round
Regular season (18 teams)	12 licensed clubs with a long-term licence; 6 associated clubs with an annual licence; 1 two-year wild card; 3 one-year wild cards; 2 EuroCup Finalists	
Playoffs (8 teams)		8 highest-placed teams from the regular season
Final Four (4 teams)		4 series winners from the playoffs

=== Qualified teams ===
The labels in the parentheses show how each team qualified for the place of its starting round:

Qualified teams for 2022–23 EuroLeague Licensed clubs
(Spain) Barcelona	(Greece) Olympiacos	(Turkey) Anadolu Efes	(Lithuania) Žalgiris
(Spain) Baskonia	(Greece) Panathinaikos	(Turkey) Fenerbahçe	(Germany) Bayern Munich
(Spain) Real Madrid	(Israel) Maccabi Tel Aviv	(Italy) Olimpia Milano	(France) ASVEL

Associated clubs
(Germany) ALBA Berlin (WC)	(France) Monaco (EC)	(Italy) Virtus Bologna (EC)	(Serbia) Crvena zvezda (ABA)
(Spain) Valencia (WC)	(Serbia) Partizan (WC)		

Notes

1. France (FRA): AS Monaco is a club based in Monaco (which does not qualify for European competitions), but participate in European competitions through one of the berths for France (any coefficient points it earns count toward France)

== Teams ==
=== Venues and locations ===
Location of teams in 2022–23 EuroLeague

Team	Home city	Arena	Capacity	Kit manufacturer
(Germany) ALBA Berlin	Berlin	Mercedes-Benz Arena	14,500	Adidas
(Turkey) Anadolu Efes	Istanbul	Sinan Erdem Dome	16,000	Bilcee
(Spain) Barcelona	Barcelona	Palau Blaugrana	7,585	Nike
(Germany) Bayern Munich	Munich	Audi Dome	6,500	Adidas
(Spain) Cazoo Baskonia	Vitoria-Gasteiz	Buesa Arena	15,504	Puma
(Basketball Federation of Serbia) Crvena Zvezda Meridianbet	Belgrade	Aleksandar Nikolić Hall	8,000	Adidas
(Italy) EA7 Emporio Armani Milan	Milan	Mediolanum Forum	12,700	EA7
(Turkey) Fenerbahçe Beko	Istanbul	Ülker Sports and Event Hall	13,059	Own Brand
(France) LDLC ASVEL	Villeurbanne	Astroballe	5,556	Adidas
(Israel) Maccabi Playtika Tel Aviv	Tel Aviv	Menora Mivtachim Arena	10,383	Puma
(France) AS Monaco	Monaco	Salle Gaston Médecin	5,000	Errea
(Greece) Olympiacos	Piraeus	Peace and Friendship Stadium	11,847	GSA
(Greece) Panathinaikos	Athens	OAKA Altion	18,989	Adidas
(Basketball Federation of Serbia) Partizan Mozzart Bet	Belgrade	Štark Arena	19,394	Under Armour
(Spain) Real Madrid	Madrid	WiZink Center	13,109	Adidas
(Spain) Valencia Basket	Valencia	La Fonteta	8,500	Luanvi
(Italy) Virtus Segafredo Bologna	Bologna	Segafredo Arena	9,980	Macron
(Italy) Virtus Segafredo Bologna	Bologna	PalaDozza	5,570	Macron
(Lithuania) Žalgiris	Kaunas	Žalgirio Arena	15,415	GSA

=== Managerial changes ===
Team	Outgoing manager	Manner of departure	Date of vacancy	Position in table	Replaced with	Date of appointment
(Spanish Basketball Federation) Baskonia	(Croatian Basketball Federation) Neven Spahija	Mutual agreement	9 June 2022	Pre-season	(Spanish Basketball Federation) Joan Peñarroya	13 June 2022
(Spanish Basketball Federation) Valencia	(Spanish Basketball Federation) Joan Peñarroya	Signed by Baskonia	12 June 2022	Pre-season	(Spanish Basketball Federation) Álex Mumbrú	13 June 2022
(Hellenic Basketball Federation) Panathinaikos	(Hellenic Basketball Federation) Dimitris Priftis	Signed by Tofaş	16 June 2022	Pre-season	(Basketball Federation of Montenegro) Dejan Radonjić	30 June 2022
(Turkish Basketball Federation) Fenerbahçe	(Basketball Federation of Serbia) Aleksandar Đorđević	Mutual agreement	17 June 2022	Pre-season	(Hellenic Basketball Federation) Dimitris Itoudis	19 June 2022
(Israeli Basketball Association) Maccabi Tel Aviv	(Israeli Basketball Association) Avi Even	End of caretaker spell	19 June 2022	Pre-season	(Israeli Basketball Association) Oded Kattash	19 June 2022
(Basketball Federation of Serbia) Crvena zvezda	(Basketball Federation of Montenegro) Dejan Radonjić	Signed by Panathinaikos	30 June 2022	Pre-season	(Basketball Federation of Serbia) Vladimir Jovanović	8 July 2022
(Spanish Basketball Federation) Real Madrid	(Spanish Basketball Federation) Pablo Laso	Sacked	4 July 2022	Pre-season	(Spanish Basketball Federation) Chus Mateo	5 July 2022
(Basketball Federation of Serbia) Crvena zvezda	(Basketball Federation of Serbia) Vladimir Jovanović	Mutual agreement	13 November 2022	18th (1–6)	(Basketball Federation of Montenegro) Duško Ivanović	14 November 2022
(Hellenic Basketball Federation) Panathinaikos	(Basketball Federation of Montenegro) Dejan Radonjić	Sacked	21 February 2023	16th (8–16)	(Hellenic Basketball Federation) Christos Serelis	21 February 2023

=== Referees ===
A total of 70 Euroleague Basketball officials are set to work on the 2022–23 season in EuroLeague and EuroCup:

- (Albanian Basketball Association) Gentian Cici
- (Argentine Basketball Confederation) Leandro Lezcano
- (Basketball Belgium) Nick van den Broeck
- (Basketball Federation of Bosnia and Herzegovina) Dragan Porobić
- (Croatian Basketball Federation) Denis Hadžić
- (Croatian Basketball Federation) Josip Radojković
- (Croatian Basketball Federation) Luka Kardum
- (Croatian Basketball Federation) Sreten Radović
- (Croatian Basketball Federation) Tomislav Hordov
- (Czech Basketball Federation) Robert Vyklický
- (Estonian Basketball Association) Aare Halliko
- (Estonian Basketball Association) Rain Peerandi
- (French Federation of Basketball) Hugues Thépénier
- (French Federation of Basketball) Joseph Bissang
- (French Federation of Basketball) Maxime Boubert
- (French Federation of Basketball) Mehdi Difallah
- (French Federation of Basketball) Thomas Bissuel
- (German Basketball Federation) Anne Panther
- (German Basketball Federation) Robert Lottermoser
- (German Basketball Federation) Steve Bittner
- (British Basketball) Eduard Udyanskyy
- (Hellenic Basketball Federation) Elias Koromilas
- (Hellenic Basketball Federation) Ioannis Foufis
- (Hellenic Basketball Federation) Vassilis Pitsilkas
- (Hellenic Basketball Federation) Vasiliki Tsaroucha
- (Israeli Basketball Association) Adar Peer
- (Israeli Basketball Association) Amit Balak
- (Israeli Basketball Association) Noam Gordon
- (Israeli Basketball Association) Seffi Shemmesh
- (Italian Basketball Federation) Carmelo Paternicò
- (Italian Basketball Federation) Guido Giovannetti
- (Italian Basketball Federation) Michele Rossi
- (Latvian Basketball Association) Kristaps Konstantinovs
- (Latvian Basketball Association) Oļegs Latiševs
- (Lithuanian Basketball Federation) Artūras Šukys
- (Lithuanian Basketball Federation) Gytis Vilius
- (Lithuanian Basketball Federation) Jurgis Laurinavičius
- (Basketball Federation of Montenegro) Igor Dragojević
- (Basketball Federation of Montenegro) Miloš Koljenšić
- (Polish Basketball Federation) Jakub Zamojski
- (Polish Basketball Federation) Marcin Kowalski
- (Polish Basketball Federation) Piotr Pastusiak
- (Polish Basketball Federation) Tomasz Trawicki
- (Portuguese Basketball Federation) Fernando Rocha
- (Portuguese Basketball Federation) Sérgio Silva
- (Basketball Federation of Serbia) Ilija Belošević
- (Basketball Federation of Serbia) Marko Juras
- (Basketball Federation of Serbia) Milivoje Jovčić
- (Basketball Federation of Serbia) Uroš Nikolić
- (Basketball Federation of Serbia) Uroš Obrknežević
- (Basketball Federation of Slovenia) Damir Javor
- (Basketball Federation of Slovenia) Mario Majkić
- (Basketball Federation of Slovenia) Matej Boltauzer
- (Basketball Federation of Slovenia) Milan Nedović
- (Basketball Federation of Slovenia) Saša Pukl
- (Basketball Federation of Slovenia) Sašo Petek
- (Spanish Basketball Federation) Alberto Baena
- (Spanish Basketball Federation) Benjamín Jiménez
- (Spanish Basketball Federation) Carlos Cortés
- (Spanish Basketball Federation) Carlos Peruga
- (Spanish Basketball Federation) Daniel Hierrezuelo
- (Spanish Basketball Federation) Emilio Pérez
- (Spanish Basketball Federation) Jordi Aliaga
- (Spanish Basketball Federation) Juan Carlos García
- (Spanish Basketball Federation) Miguel Ángel Pérez
- (Swedish Basketball Federation) Saulius Račys
- (Swiss Basketball) Sébastien Clivaz
- (Turkish Basketball Federation) Emin Moğulkoç
- (Turkish Basketball Federation) Hüseyin Çelik
- (Basketball Federation of Ukraine) Borys Ryzhyk

== Regular season ==
=== League table ===
Pos	Team	Pld	W	L	PF	PA	PD	Qualification
1	(Hellenic Basketball Federation) Olympiacos	34	24	10	2857	2578	+279	Qualification to playoffs
2	(Spanish Basketball Federation) Barcelona	34	23	11	2723	2580	+143	Qualification to playoffs
3	(Spanish Basketball Federation) Real Madrid	34	23	11	2877	2666	+211	Qualification to playoffs
4	(French Federation of Basketball) AS Monaco	34	21	13	2802	2749	+53	Qualification to playoffs
5	(Israeli Basketball Association) Maccabi Playtika Tel Aviv	34	20	14	2827	2743	+84	Qualification to playoffs
6	(Basketball Federation of Serbia) Partizan Mozzart Bet	34	20	14	2877	2781	+96	Qualification to playoffs
7	(Lithuanian Basketball Federation) Žalgiris	34	19	15	2591	2626	−35	Qualification to playoffs
8	(Turkish Basketball Federation) Fenerbahçe Beko	34	19	15	2823	2745	+78	Qualification to playoffs
9	(Spanish Basketball Federation) Cazoo Baskonia	34	18	16	2919	2836	+83	
10	(Basketball Federation of Serbia) Crvena zvezda Meridianbet	34	17	17	2591	2613	−22	
11	(Turkish Basketball Federation) Anadolu Efes	34	17	17	2800	2736	+64	
12	(Italian Basketball Federation) EA7 Emporio Armani Milan	34	15	19	2534	2611	−77	
13	(Spanish Basketball Federation) Valencia Basket	34	15	19	2756	2891	−135	
14	(Italian Basketball Federation) Virtus Segafredo Bologna	34	14	20	2644	2801	−157	
15	(German Basketball Federation) Bayern Munich	34	11	23	2605	2739	−134	
16	(German Basketball Federation) ALBA Berlin	34	11	23	2704	2851	−147	
17	(Hellenic Basketball Federation) Panathinaikos (Note: Panathinaikos were docked two wins as a punishment by Euroleague Basketball for breaching Financial Fair Play regulations.)	32	9	23	2649	2773	−124	
18	(French Federation of Basketball) LDLC ASVEL	34	8	26	2527	2787	−260	

Source: EuroLeague
Rules for classification: All points scored in extra period(s) were not counted in the standings, nor for any tie-break situation.

=== Regulations ===
When more than two teams are tied, the ranking is established taking into account the victories obtained in the games played only among them. Should the tie persist among some, but not all, of the teams, the ranking of the teams still tied is determined by again taking into account the victories in the games played only among them, and repeating this same procedure until the tie is entirely resolved. If a tie persists, the ranking is determined by the point difference in favour and against in the games played only among the teams still tied.

=== Results ===
Home \ Away	BER	EFS	BAR	BAY	BKN	CZV	EAM	FNB	ASV	MTA	ASM	OLY	PAO	PAR	RMB	VAL	VIR	ZAL
ALBA Berlin	—	95–93	86–88	77–79	85–84	84–88	83–63	75–104	88–71	70–83	84–102	60–93	94–65	100–84	77–84	88–94	74–96	63–66
Anadolu Efes	78–74	—	96–86	81–89	78–83	72–59	89–69	79–88	78–72	64–86	87–72	82–71	88–69	84–97	90–89	91–92	86–67	80–70
Barcelona	72–56	75–80	—	72–70	96–84	85–79	74–56	81–80	74–75	83–78	80–70	70–80	74–68	79–68	75–73	85–71	75–83	93–74
Bayern Munich	75–76	81–78	73–84	—	92–79	87–80	81–83	62–74	76–72	98–89	81–84	71–82	84–68	71–82	64–68	97–92	91–84	80–83
Cazoo Baskonia	93–87	114–111	78–85	78–53	—	92–75	78–62	92–69	120–100	116–87	93–102	92–97	95–90	103–96	92–86	114–75	90–79	93–73
Crvena zvezda Meridianbet	72–87	94–75	94–99	78–72	74–63	—	67–71	91–89	71–67	69–68	92–68	87–79	75–77	78–79	59–79	92–73	83–74	77–73
EA7 Emporio Armani Milan	74–80	51–80	84–76	99–74	89–83	74–68	—	72–82	73–79	71–77	79–71	83–62	78–76	76–62	77–83	90–79	59–64	61–66
Fenerbahçe Beko	101–86	103–86	81–73	79–71	70–76	93–79	75–82	—	84–63	86–71	98–94	73–93	107–77	72–73	71–85	79–77	104–72	87–79
LDLC ASVEL	79–91	89–90	75–82	74–75	87–61	60–76	62–69	91–77	—	67–85	75–84	77–75	82–86	91–87	71–75	79–83	64–77	76–93
Maccabi Playtika Tel Aviv	87–74	80–72	79–86	90–82	93–79	86–89	85–66	78–74	88–69	—	78–70	90–84	85–74	90–81	100–96	84–68	111–80	84–83
AS Monaco	92–89	95–92	63–69	80–79	79–74	85–77	101–88	93–96	87–75	86–67	—	64–60	84–70	84–88	91–95	90–79	81–68	84–82
Olympiacos	86–76	76–70	77–70	102–74	86–78	86–90	82–66	94–67	81–55	95–89	76–81	—	81–73	87–58	73–60	82–83	117–71	90–80
Panathinaikos	84–88	82–87	74–88	86–76	98–83	75–66	90–77	88–94	77–58	88–86	80–83	71–95	—	89–91	68–71	91–92	88–85	89–65
Partizan Mozzart Bet	88–74	82–79	80–89	83–77	83–65	73–76	75–80	94–97	92–71	96–88	100–80	90–75	83–81	—	104–90	96–100	90–62	87–76
Real Madrid	90–72	94–85	91–86	79–67	81–85	72–56	91–87	90–75	92–73	98–65	94–95	87–89	83–68	105–97	—	95–91	91–95	96–69
Valencia Basket	87–73	81–71	84–83	82–73	71–81	75–77	84–88	82–80	76–77	93–94	89–84	85–92	94–91	89–81	73–80	—	79–68	76–80
Virtus Segafredo Bologna	85–76	80–85	75–92	66–63	88–83	84–72	89–84	92–88	79–84	78–73	66–83	83–85	74–64	79–88	79–96	89–59	—	77–87
Žalgiris	88–81	60–86	73–72	75–67	79–75	71–66	71–62	86–66	85–67	68–67	79–70	72–74	67–81	74–88	81–72	95–74	68–65	—

Source: EuroLeague
Legend: Blue = home team win; Red = away team win.
Matches with lighter background shading were decided after overtime.

== Playoffs ==
Playoffs series are best-of-five. The first team to win three games wins the series. A 2–2–1 format is used – teams with home-court advantage play games 1, 2, and 5 at home, while their opponents host games 3 and 4. Games 4 and 5 are only played if necessary. The four winning teams advance to the Final Four.

=== Series ===
Team 1	Series	Team 2	Game 1	Game 2	Game 3	Game 4	Game 5
Olympiacos (Greece)	3–2	(Turkey) Fenerbahçe Beko	79–68	78–82	72–71	69–73	84–72
AS Monaco (France)	3–2	(Israel) Maccabi Playtika Tel Aviv	67–79	86–74	83–78	69–104	97–86
Real Madrid (Spain)	3–2	(Serbia) Partizan Mozzart Bet	87–89	80–95	82–80	85–78	98–94
Barcelona (Spain)	3–0	(Lithuania) Žalgiris	91–69	89–81	77–66	–	–

== Final Four ==
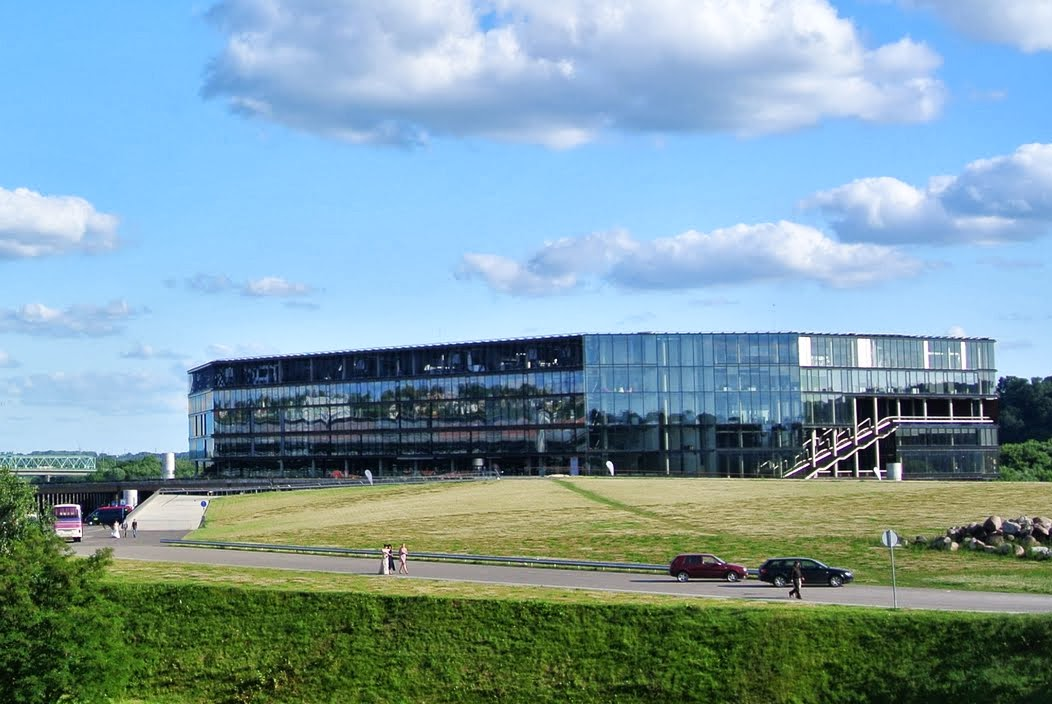
Žalgirio Arena in Kaunas, Lithuania

The Final Four, held over a single weekend, is the last phase of the season. The four remaining teams play a single knockout round on Friday evening, with the two winners advancing to the championship game. Sunday starts with the third-place game, followed by the championship game. The 2023 EuroLeague Final Four was played at the Žalgirio Arena in Kaunas, Lithuania, on 19–21 May 2023.

Semifinals
19 May
(Hellenic Basketball Federation) Olympiacos	76
(French Federation of Basketball) AS Monaco	62
19 May
(Spanish Basketball Federation) Barcelona	66
(Spanish Basketball Federation) Real Madrid	78

Championship game
21 May
(Hellenic Basketball Federation) Olympiacos	78
(Spanish Basketball Federation) Real Madrid	79
Third place game
21 May
(French Federation of Basketball) AS Monaco	78
(Spanish Basketball Federation) Barcelona	66

== Awards ==
All official awards of the 2022–23 EuroLeague.

=== EuroLeague MVP ===
- (Bulgaria) Sasha Vezenkov ( (Greece) Olympiacos)

=== EuroLeague Final Four MVP ===
- (Cape Verde) Edy Tavares ( (Spain) Real Madrid)

=== All-EuroLeague Teams ===
Pos.	First Team		Second Team	
G	(Spain) Lorenzo Brown	(Israel) Maccabi Playtika Tel Aviv	(United States) Darius Thompson	(Spain) Cazoo Baskonia
G	(Bosnia and Herzegovina) Džanan Musa	(Spain) Real Madrid	(United States) Kevin Punter	(Serbia) Partizan Mozzart Bet
F	(Bulgaria) Sasha Vezenkov	(Greece) Olympiacos	(United States) Wade Baldwin	(Israel) Maccabi Playtika Tel Aviv
F	(France) Mathias Lessort	(Serbia) Partizan Mozzart Bet	(United States) Mike James	(France) AS Monaco
C	(Cape Verde) Edy Tavares	(Spain) Real Madrid	(Spain) Nikola Mirotić	(Spain) Barcelona

=== Alphonso Ford Top Scorer Trophy ===
- (Bulgaria) Sasha Vezenkov ( (Greece) Olympiacos)

=== Best Defender ===
- (Cape Verde) Edy Tavares ( (Spain) Real Madrid)

=== Rising Star ===
- (Israel) Yam Madar ( (Serbia) Partizan Mozzart Bet)

=== Coach of the Year ===
- (Greece) Georgios Bartzokas ( (Greece) Olympiacos)

=== MVP of the Round ===
Regular season

Round	Player	Team	PIR	Ref.
1	(Estonia) Maik Kotsar	(Spain) Cazoo Baskonia	31	
2	(Bulgaria) Sasha Vezenkov	(Greece) Olympiacos	37	
3	(United States) Luke Sikma	(Germany) ALBA Berlin	33	
4	(United States) Mike James	(France) AS Monaco	29	
4	(Bulgaria) Sasha Vezenkov (2)	(Greece) Olympiacos	29	
4	(Italy) Nicolò Melli	(Italy) EA7 Emporio Armani Milan	29	
5	(Spain) Lorenzo Brown	(Israel) Maccabi Playtika Tel Aviv	33	
6	(Bosnia and Herzegovina) Džanan Musa	(Spain) Real Madrid	31	
7	(United States) Johnathan Motley	(Turkey) Fenerbahçe Beko	33	
7	(Armenia) Chris Jones	(Spain) Valencia Basket	33	
8	(Bulgaria) Sasha Vezenkov (3)	(Greece) Olympiacos	43	
9	(Bosnia and Herzegovina) Džanan Musa (2)	(Spain) Real Madrid	32	
10	(Bulgaria) Sasha Vezenkov (4)	(Greece) Olympiacos	34	
11	(Serbia) Vasilije Micić	(Turkey) Anadolu Efes	31	
12	(United States) Dwayne Bacon	(Greece) Panathinaikos	28	
12	(Senegal) Pierriá Henry	(Spain) Cazoo Baskonia	28	
13	(Montenegro) Bojan Dubljević	(Spain) Valencia Basket	33	
14	(Uganda) Brandon Davies	(Italy) EA7 Emporio Armani Milan	30	
15	(United States) Keenan Evans	(Lithuania) Žalgiris	39	
16	(France) Élie Okobo	(France) AS Monaco	35	
17	(Serbia) Filip Petrušev	(Serbia) Crvena zvezda Meridianbet	36	
18	(Cape Verde) Edy Tavares	(Spain) Real Madrid	35	
19	(United States) Johnathan Motley (2)	(Turkey) Fenerbahçe Beko	38	
20	(United States) Wade Baldwin	(Israel) Maccabi Playtika Tel Aviv	35	
21	(United States) Darius Thompson	(Spain) Cazoo Baskonia	36	
22	(United States) Will Clyburn	(Turkey) Anadolu Efes	27	
23	(United States) Nigel Hayes	(Turkey) Fenerbahçe Beko	37	
24	(Bulgaria) Sasha Vezenkov (5)	(Greece) Olympiacos	40	
25	(Serbia) Marko Gudurić	(Turkey) Fenerbahçe Beko	35	
26	(United States) Will Clyburn (2)	(Turkey) Anadolu Efes	32	
27	(Australia) Dante Exum	(Serbia) Partizan Mozzart Bet	33	
28	(Argentina) Gabriel Deck	(Spain) Real Madrid	26	
28	(Nigeria) Chima Moneke	(France) AS Monaco	26	
29	(Bosnia and Herzegovina) Džanan Musa (3)	(Spain) Real Madrid	38	
30	(France) Guerschon Yabusele	(Spain) Real Madrid	30	
31	(Estonia) Maik Kotsar (2)	(Spain) Cazoo Baskonia	40	
31	(Greece) Georgios Papagiannis	(Greece) Panathinaikos	40	
32	(Greece) Thomas Walkup	(Greece) Olympiacos	32	
33	(United States) Darius Thompson (2)	(Spain) Cazoo Baskonia	36	
34	(Italy) Daniel Hackett	(Italy) Virtus Segafredo Bologna	36	

Playoffs

Round	Player	Team	PIR	Ref.
1	(United States) Kevin Punter	(Serbia) Partizan Mozzart Bet	33	
2	(United States) Jordan Loyd	(France) AS Monaco	35	
3	(Cape Verde) Edy Tavares (2)	(Spain) Real Madrid	41	
4	(Cape Verde) Edy Tavares (3)	(Spain) Real Madrid	30	
5	(Greece) Kostas Sloukas	(Greece) Olympiacos	27	

=== MVP of the Month ===
Month	Round	Player	Team	Ref.
2022
October	1–5	(United States) Mike James	(France) AS Monaco	
November	6–10	(Bulgaria) Sasha Vezenkov	(Greece) Olympiacos	
December	11–16	(Argentina) Luca Vildoza	(Serbia) Crvena zvezda Meridianbet	
2023
January	17–21	(United States) Augustine Rubit	(Germany) Bayern Munich	
February	22–25	(Bulgaria) Sasha Vezenkov (2)	(Greece) Olympiacos	
March	26–32	(United States) Wade Baldwin	(Israel) Maccabi Playtika Tel Aviv	
April/May	33–PO5	(Cape Verde) Edy Tavares	(Spain) Real Madrid	

== Statistics ==
=== Individual statistics ===
==== Rating ====
Rank	Name	Team	Games	Rating	PIR
1.	(Bulgaria) Sasha Vezenkov	(Greece) Olympiacos	40	859	21.5
2.	(France) Mathias Lessort	(Serbia) Partizan Mozzart Bet	38	727	19.1
3.	(United States) Will Clyburn	(Turkey) Anadolu Efes	34	633	18.6

Source: EuroLeague

==== Points ====
Rank	Name	Team	Games	Points	PPG
1.	(Bulgaria) Sasha Vezenkov	(Greece) Olympiacos	40	703	17.6
2.	(United States) Wade Baldwin	(Israel) Maccabi Playtika Tel Aviv	34	584	17.2
3.	(United States) Will Clyburn	(Turkey) Anadolu Efes	34	567	16.7

Source: EuroLeague

==== Rebounds ====
Rank	Name	Team	Games	Rebounds	RPG
1.	(France) Mathias Lessort	(Serbia) Partizan Mozzart Bet	38	268	7.1
2.	(Cape Verde) Edy Tavares	(Spain) Real Madrid	40	276	6.9
3.	(Bulgaria) Sasha Vezenkov	(Greece) Olympiacos	40	274	6.8

Source: EuroLeague

==== Assists ====
Rank	Name	Team	Games	Assists	APG
1.	(United States) Darius Thompson	(Spain) Cazoo Baskonia	34	227	6.7
2.	(Serbia) Miloš Teodosić	(Italy) Virtus Segafredo Bologna	26	155	6.0
3.	(Greece) Thomas Walkup	(Greece) Olympiacos	41	231	5.6

Source: EuroLeague

==== Blocks ====
Rank	Name	Team	Games	Blocks	BPG
1.	(Cape Verde) Edy Tavares	(Spain) Real Madrid	40	88	2.2
2.	(Greece) Georgios Papagiannis	(Greece) Panathinaikos	33	40	1.2
3.	(Chad) Christ Koumadje	(Germany) ALBA Berlin	31	32	1.0

Source: EuroLeague

==== Other statistics ====
Category	Player	Team	Games	Average
Steals	(Greece) Thomas Walkup	(Greece) Olympiacos	41	1.8
Turnovers	(Serbia) Miloš Teodosić	(Italy) Virtus Segafredo Bologna	26	3.3
Fouls drawn	(United States) Mike James	(France) AS Monaco	38	5.1
Minutes	(United States) Will Clyburn	(Turkey) Anadolu Efes	34	33:07
FT %	(Israel) John DiBartolomeo	(Israel) Maccabi Playtika Tel Aviv	39	98.2%
2-Point %	(United States) Donta Hall	(France) AS Monaco	41	72.9%
3-Point %	(France) Amath M'Baye	(Turkey) Anadolu Efes	33	51.7%

=== Individual game highs ===
Category	Player	Team	Statistic	Opponent
Rating	(Bulgaria) Sasha Vezenkov	(Greece) Olympiacos	43	(Germany) Bayern Munich (Nov 17, 2022)
Rating	(Spain) Lorenzo Brown	(Israel) Maccabi Playtika Tel Aviv	43	(Germany) Bayern Munich (Dec 2, 2022)
Points	(United States) Wade Baldwin	(Israel) Maccabi Playtika Tel Aviv	38	(Serbia) Crvena zvezda Meridianbet (Feb 9, 2023)
Rebounds	(France) Youssoupha Fall	(France) LDLC ASVEL	18	(Spain) Barcelona (Dec 9, 2022)
Assists	(United States) Darius Thompson	(Spain) Cazoo Baskonia	16	(Turkey) Anadolu Efes (Jan 27, 2023)
Steals	(Greece) Thomas Walkup	(Greece) Olympiacos	6	(Germany) Bayern Munich (Nov 17, 2022)
Blocks	(Chad) Christ Koumadje	(Germany) ALBA Berlin	6	(Turkey) Anadolu Efes (Oct 21, 2022)
Blocks	(Cape Verde) Edy Tavares	(Spain) Real Madrid	6	(Germany) Bayern Munich (Dec 13, 2022)

=== Team statistics ===
Category	Team	Average
Rating	(Spain) Real Madrid	100.7
Points	(Spain) Cazoo Baskonia	86.7
Rebounds	(Spain) Real Madrid	36.7
Assists	(Greece) Olympiacos	21
Steals	(Greece) Olympiacos	7.3
Blocks	(Spain) Real Madrid	4
Turnovers	(Germany) ALBA Berlin	14.5
Turnovers	(Italy) Virtus Segafredo Bologna	14.5
FT %	(Serbia) Partizan Mozzart Bet	82.4%
2-Point %	(Greece) Olympiacos	60.2%
3-Point %	(Spain) Barcelona	40.3%

== Attendances ==
As of 21 May 2023

Pos	Team	Total	High	Low	Average	Change
1	(Basketball Federation of Serbia) Partizan Mozzart Bet	340,816	20,091	13,779	17,938	n/a^{1}
2	(Lithuanian Basketball Federation) Žalgiris	266,917	15,293	11,024	14,829	+94.4%
3	(Turkish Basketball Federation) Anadolu Efes	222,940	15,290	9,974	13,114	−4.1%
4	Final Four in Kaunas	43,483	11,673	9,333	10,871	−22.0%
5	(Hellenic Basketball Federation) Olympiacos	198,621	11,677	0	10,454	+70.7%
6	(Israeli Basketball Association) Maccabi Playtika Tel Aviv	187,768	10,575	10,151	10,432	+1.3%
7	(Turkish Basketball Federation) Fenerbahçe Beko	197,494	15,760	7,932	10,394	+87.4%
8	(Italian Basketball Federation) EA7 Emporio Armani Milan	155,595	11,942	6,027	9,153	+105.3%
9	(Spanish Basketball Federation) Cazoo Baskonia	151,893	15,554	6,081	8,935	+29.8%
10	(German Basketball Federation) ALBA Berlin	149,936	13,166	6,545	8,820	+130.6%
11	(Spanish Basketball Federation) Real Madrid	162,569	12,867	6,381	8,128	+43.3%
12	(Basketball Federation of Serbia) Crvena zvezda Meridianbet	120,442	8,300	5,893	7,085	+17.3%
13	(Spanish Basketball Federation) Barcelona	120,714	7,511	5,066	6,353	+30.4%
14	(Hellenic Basketball Federation) Panathinaikos	105,137	17,885	2,340	6,185	+59.3%
15	(Italian Basketball Federation) Virtus Segafredo Bologna	104,258	8,900	3,648	6,133	n/a^{1}
16	(Spanish Basketball Federation) Valencia Basket	103,114	7,906	4,978	6,066	n/a^{1}
17	(German Basketball Federation) Bayern Munich	93,322	6,500	3,071	5,490	+158.1%
18	(French Federation of Basketball) LDLC ASVEL	88,102	5,498	4,422	5,182	+22.3%
19	(French Federation of Basketball) AS Monaco	87,831	4,927	3,655	4,392	+27.0%
	League total	2,900,952	20,091	2,340	8,899	+58.0%

Source: EuroLeague
Notes:
1: Team did not participate in the last EuroLeague regular season.

1. Olympiacos played their inaugural regular season home match behind closed doors due to suspension. Turkish Airlines Euroleague does not count this match in the club's average attendance. Thus in the official publication on average attendances during the 2022–23 regular season, the average of the total attendance (163,590) of Olympiacos is calculated in 16, not in 17 home matches, giving 10,224. This table's average includes play-off.

== See also ==
- 2022–23 EuroCup Basketball
- 2022–23 Basketball Champions League
- 2022–23 FIBA Europe Cup
