= Salle Gaston Médecin =

Sports arena in Monaco

- Salle Omnisports
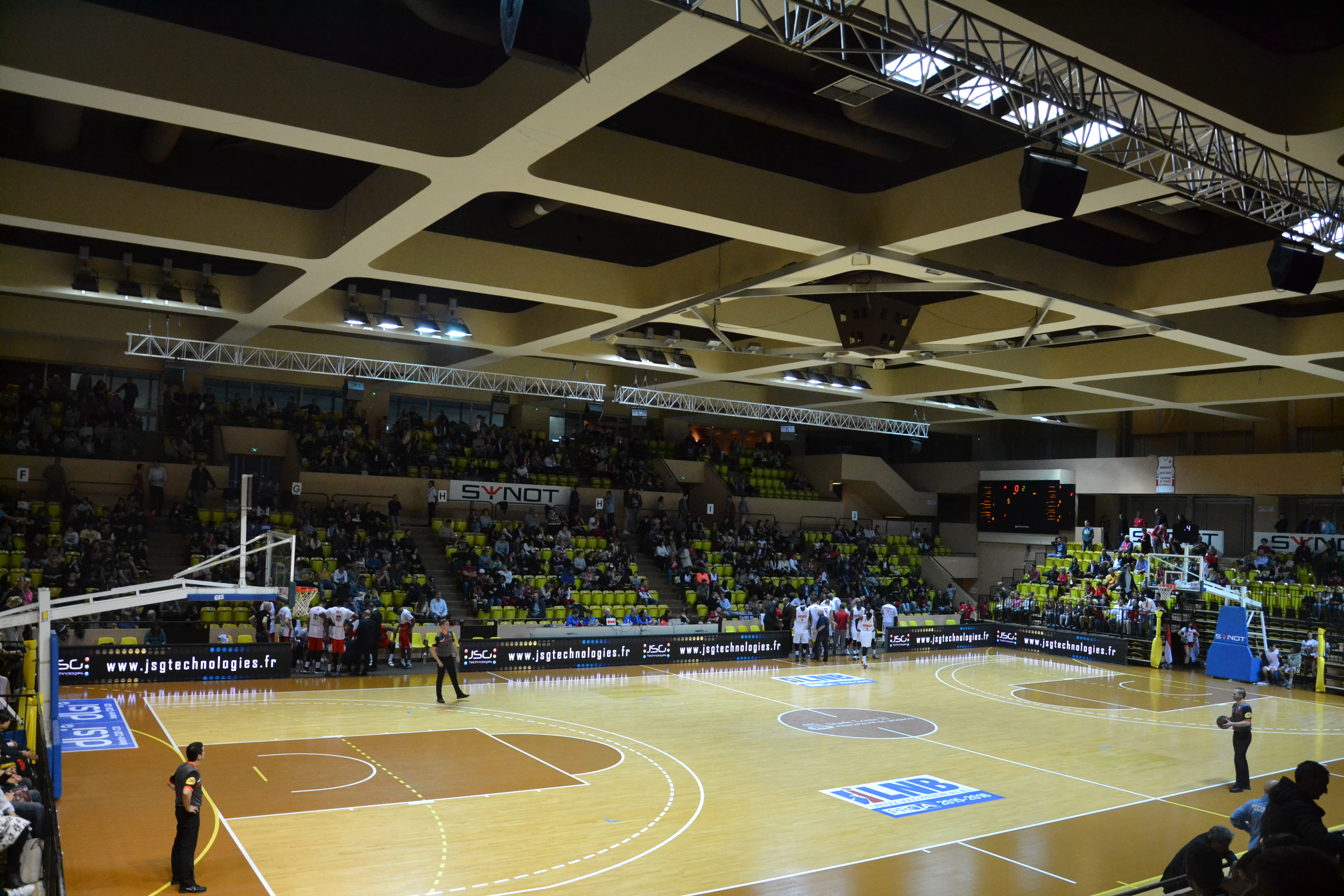
- Salle Gaston Médecin, in 2016, when the arena's seating capacity was 3,200.
- Interactive map of Salle Gaston Médecin
- Full name: Stade Louis II Salle Omnisports Gaston Médecin
- Location: Monaco, Monaco
- Coordinates: 43°43′39.38″N 7°24′56.21″E
- Capacity: Basketball: 5,000
- Surface: Parquet

Construction
- Opened: 1985
- Renovated: 2014–2016, 2018, 2021–2022
- Expanded: 2014, 2015, 2016, 2017, 2021, 2022
- Cost: €14 million (2021–2022 renovation)

Tenant
- AS Monaco (1985–present)

Salle Gaston Médecin, or Salle Omnisports, is a multi-purpose indoor sports arena, that is located in the Fontvieille district, within the Principality of Monaco. It is primarily used to host basketball, volleyball, and handball games, judo and fencing matches, and weightlifting and gymnastics competitions. The arena is a part of the Stade Louis II multi-sports complex, and is owned by the Monaco-based multi-sports club AS Monaco. The arena is named after Gaston Médécin, a Monegasque athlete who died in 1983. The arena's seating capacity is 5,000 people for basketball games.

== History ==
The Salle Gaston Médecin was originally opened in the year 1985, with Prince Rainier III being in attendance at its opening. Over the years, it has been used as the main home venue of the professional basketball club AS Monaco Basket. The arena was subject to a renovation and modernization process between 2014 and 2016, and again in 2018. It then underwent yet another renovation modernization project, at a cost of €14 million, between 2021 and 2022.

In 2014, the arena's seating capacity was increased from 2,500 to 2,840. In 2015, the arena's seating capacity was increased again, from 2,840 to 3,000. In 2016, there was yet another seating capacity increase, from 3,000 to 3,200. In 2017, the arena's seating capacity was increased once more, from 3,200 to 3,700. In 2021, the arena's seating capacity was further increased, from 3,700 to 4,090.

Its capacity was then increased in 2022 in four increments. First to 4,600, then to 4,700, then to 4,950, and eventually, to 5,000, in order to meet the minimum arena size requirements for non A license EuroLeague teams.

== Seating capacity history ==
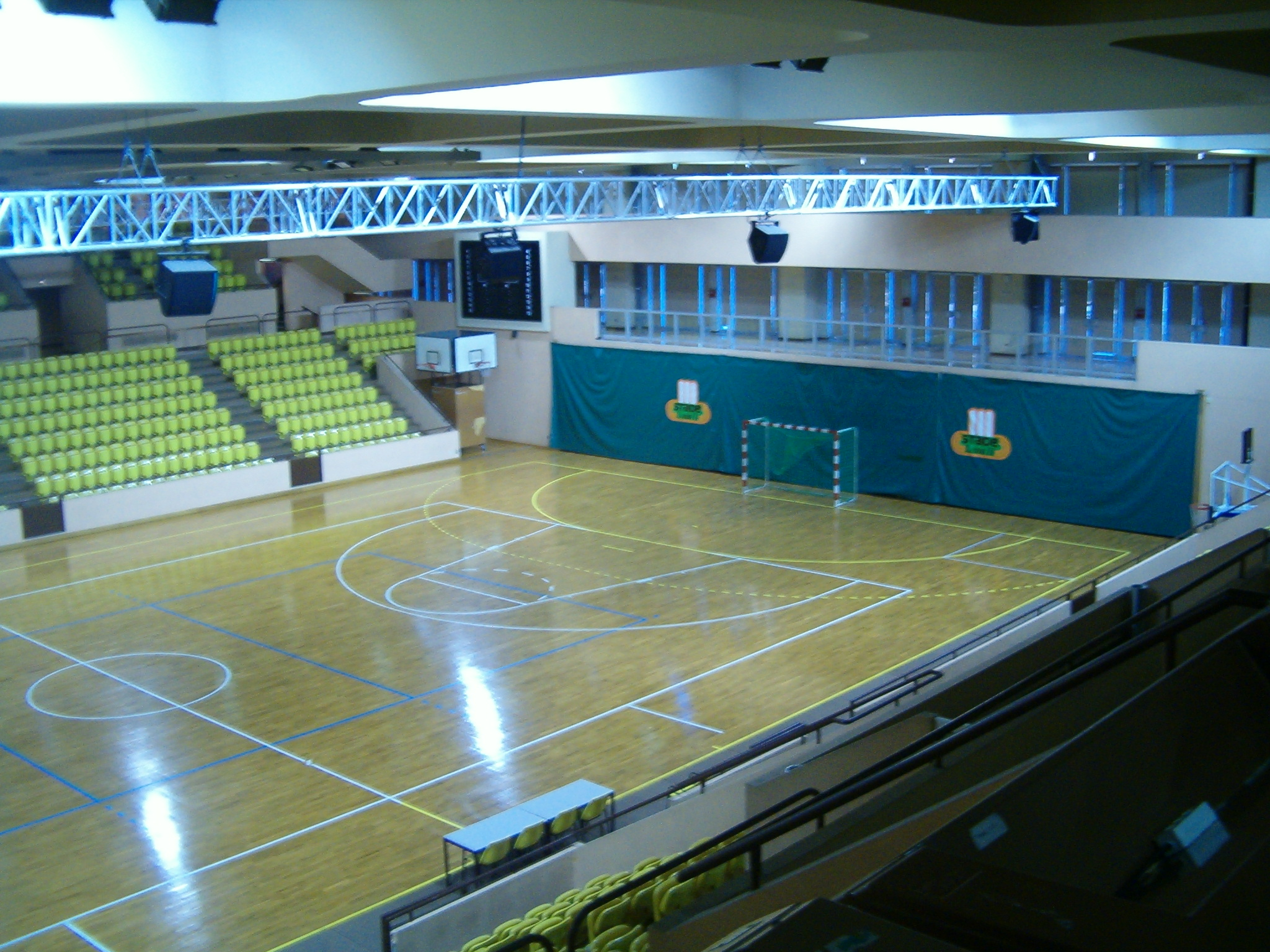
Salle Gaston Médecin in 2007, when the arena's seating capacity was 2,500.

- The Salle Gaston Médecin arena's seating capacity history.

| Years | Seating Capacity |
|---|---|
| 1985–2014 | 2,500 |
| 2014 Expansion | 2,840 |
| 2015 Expansion | 3,000 |
| 2016 Expansion | 3,200 |
| 2017 Expansion | 3,700 |
| 2021 Expansion | 4,090 |
| 2022 Stage I Expansion | 4,600 |
| 2022 Stage II Expansion | 4,700 |
| 2022 Stage III Expansion | 4,950 |
| 2022 Stage IV Expansion | 5,000 |
