= 2020–21 AEK B.C. season =

AEK
2020–21 season
- Chairman: Makis Angelopoulos
- Head coach: Ilias Papatheodorou (1–21); Vangelis Angelou (22–Playoffs)
- Arena: Nikos Galis Olympic Indoor Hall
- Greek League: 3rd
- Greek Cup: QF
- Greek Super Cup: 4th
- Champions League: Playoffs
GBL Home	GBL Away	BCL

The 2020–21 AEK B.C. season is AEK's 64th season in the top-tier level Greek Basket League. AEK competed in four different competitions during the season.

== Transfers 2020–21 ==
=== Players In ===
No.	Pos.	Nat.	Name	Age	Moving from		Type	Ends	Transfer fee	Date	Source
2	C	(Angola)	Yanick Moreira	29	Peristeri	(Greece)		July 1, 2021	Free	June 18, 2019	
24	SF	(Belgium)	Matt Lojeski	35	Tofaş	(Turkey)		July 1, 2021	Free	July 27, 2020	
19	C	(Greece)	Costis Gontikas	26	Peristeri	(Greece)		July 1, 2021	Free	August 1, 2020	
13	PG	(Greece)	Dimitrios Katsivelis	28	Promitheas	(Greece)		July 1, 2021	Free	August 8, 2020	
4	PG	(Montenegro)	Tyrese Rice	33	Panathinaikos	(Greece)		October 1, 2020	Free	August 17, 2020	
42	PF	(United States)	Darion Atkins	28	Brose Bamberg	(Germany)		July 1, 2021	Free	September 22, 2020	
4	G	(United States)	Daryl Macon	25	Galatasaray	(Turkey)		July 1, 2021	Free	February 2, 2021	

=== Players Out ===
No.	Pos.	Nat.	Name	Age	Moving to		Type	Transfer fee	Date	Source
45	PF	(United States)	Jerai Grant	31	Maccabi Haifa	(Israel)		Free	May 24, 2020	
0	SG	(United States)	Kendrick Ray	26	Petkim Spor	(Turkey)		Free	July 18, 2020	
14	C	(Greece)	Dimitris Kaklamanakis	26	PAOK	(Greece)		Free	July 28, 2020	
31	SG	(Greece)	Charis Giannopoulos	31	Promitheas	(Greece)		Free	July 28, 2020	
11	SF	(Greece)	Ioannis Agravanis	21	Peristeri	(Greece)		Free	August 1, 2020	
4	PG	(Greece)	Vassilis Toliopoulos	24	Ionikos	(Greece)	Loan	Free	August 31, 2020	
1	PG	(United States)	Mario Chalmers	34	Aris	(Greece)		Free	September 21, 2020	
42	PF	(United States)	Darion Atkins	28	L.H.Fethiye Belediyespor	(Turkey)		Free	October 15, 2020	

== Friendlies ==
Win Loss

5 September 2020 1	Aris	59–66	AEK	Thessaloniki
(EET)
				Arena: Alexandreio

7 September 2020 2	PAOK	77–83	AEK	Thessaloniki
(EET)
				Arena: Pylaia

16 September 2020 3	AEK	80–69	PAOK	Athens
(EET)

17 September 2020 4	AEK	87–84	Ionikos	Athens
(EET)

19 September 2020 5	AEK	87–77	Panathinaikos	Athens
(EET)

20 February 2021 6	AEK	86–71	Peristeri Vikos Cola	Athens
15:00 (EET)

== Competitions ==
=== Overall ===
Competition	Started round	Current position / round	Final position / round	First match	Last match
Greek League	Matchday 1	—	3rd	24 October 2020	9 June 2021
Greek Cup	Round of 16	—	QF	11 November 2020	10 February 2021
Greek Super Cup	Final-4	—	4th	23 September 2020	24 September 2020
Champions League	Group Stage	—	Playoffs	4 November 2020	7 April 2021

Updated to match played June 10, 2021
Source: GBL Games & Results, BCL Games & Results

=== Overview ===
Competition	Record							
Competition	Pld	W	D	L	PF	PA	PD	Win %
Greek League	33	20	0	13	2,750	2,577	+173	60.61
Greek Cup	1	0	0	1	85	90	−5	0.00
Greek Super Cup	2	0	0	2	161	177	−16	0.00
Champions League	12	7	0	5	943	960	−17	58.33
Total	48	27	0	21	3,939	3,804	+135	56.25

Last updated: June 10, 2021
Source: GBL Games & Results, BCL Games & Results

=== Greek League ===
==== League table ====
Pos	Team	Pld	W	L	PF	PA	PD	Pts	Qualification or relegation
1	Panathinaikos OPAP	22	20	2	1949	1578	+371	42	Advanced to playoffs
2	Lavrio Megabolt	22	17	5	1810	1722	+88	39	Advanced to playoffs
3	Promitheas Patras	22	16	6	1768	1677	+91	38	Advanced to playoffs
4	AEK Athens	22	14	8	1813	1666	+147	36	Advanced to playoffs
5	PAOK	22	13	9	1736	1729	+7	35	Advanced to playoffs
6	Peristeri	22	11	11	1615	1634	−19	33	Advanced to playoffs
7	Kolossos H Hotels	22	8	14	1720	1703	+17	30	Advanced to playoffs
8	Ionikos Hellenic Coin	22	8	14	1699	1789	−90	30	Advanced to playoffs
9	Aris Thessaloniki	22	7	15	1622	1704	−82	29	
10	Iraklis	22	7	15	1617	1769	−152	29	
11	Larisa Bread factory	22	6	16	1633	1785	−152	28	
12	Messolonghi BAXI	22	5	17	1594	1820	−226	27	Relegated to Greek A2 Basket League

Updated to match(es) played on 10 April 2021. Source: ESAKE

==== Results summary ====
Overall						Home					Away				
Pld	W	L	PF	PA	PD	W	L	PF	PA	PD	W	L	PF	PA	PD
22	14	8	1813	1666	+147	8	3	970	852	+118	6	5	843	814	+29

Last updated: April 28, 2021.
Source: GBL Rankings

==== Results by round ====
Round	1	2	3	4	5	6	7	8	9	10	11	12	13	14	15	16	17	18	19	20	21	22
Ground	A	H	A	H	A	H	A	H	A	H	A	H	A	H	A	H	A	H	A	H	A	H
Result	W	W	W	L	W	W	W	W	L	W	L	W	W	W	W	W	W	W	L	L	L	L
Position	2	1	1	3	2	2	2	2	2	2	3	2	3	3	2	2	2	2	3	3	4	4

Updated to match(es) played on April 28, 2021. Source: GBL Fixtures
A = Away; H = Home; W = Win; D = Draw; L = Loss

==== Regular season ====
Win Loss

24 October 2020 1	Ionikos	68–81	AEK	Athens
(EET)
		Boxscore

31 October 2020 2	AEK	87–68	Larisa	Athens
(EET)
		Boxscore

7 November 2020 3	Peristeri	62–66	AEK	Athens
(EET)
		Boxscore

16 January 2021 4	AEK	75–82	Promitheas	Athens
17:00 (EET)
		Boxscore

21 November 2020 5	Messolonghi BAXI	66–87	AEK	Patras
19:30 (EET)
		Boxscore		Arena: Dimitris Tofalos Arena

27 January 2021 6	AEK	76–56	PAOK	Athens
21:00 (EET)
		Boxscore

12 December 2020 7	Iraklis	72–79	AEK	Thessaloniki
17:00 (EET)
		Boxscore

20 December 2020 8	AEK	84–67	Aris	Athens
17:00 (EET)
		Boxscore

27 December 2020 9	Lavrio	78–70	AEK	Lavrio
20:00 (EET)
		Boxscore

2 January 2021 10	AEK	89–72	Kolossos Rodou	Athens
20:00 (EET)
		Boxscore

10 January 2021 11	Panathinaikos	80–75	AEK	Athens
20:00 (EET)
		Boxscore

23 January 2021 12	AEK	81–74	Ionikos	Athens
(EET)
		Boxscore

30 January 2021 13	Larisa	76–75	AEK	Larissa
20:00 (EET)
		Boxscore		Arena: Neapolis Arena

6 February 2021 14	AEK	91–59	Peristeri	Athens
20:00 (EET)
		Boxscore

6 March 2021 15	AEK	98–76	Messolonghi BAXI	Athens
17:00 (EET)
		Boxscore

13 March 2021 16	PAOK	85–87	AEK	Athens
18:30 (EET)
		Boxscore

20 March 2021 17	AEK	100–97	Iraklis	Athens
17:30 (EET)
		Boxscore

27 March 2021 18	Aris	68–73	AEK	Athens
17:00 (EET)
		Boxscore

3 April 2021 19	AEK	94–97	Lavrio	Athens
19:30 (EET)
		Boxscore

10 April 2021 20	Kolossos Rodou	79–72	AEK	Rhodes
17:00 (EET)
		Boxscore		Arena: Kallithea Palais des Sports

14 April 2021 21	Promitheas	80–78	AEK	Patras
20:00 (EET)
		Boxscore		Arena: Dimitris Tofalos Arena

28 April 2021 22	AEK	95–104	Panathinaikos	Athens
20:00 (EET)
		Boxscore

==== Results overview ====
Win Loss

Opposition	Home score	Away score	Double
Aris	84–67	68–73	157–135
Charilaos Trikoupis	98–76	66–87	185–142
Kolossos H Hotels	89–72	79–72	161–151
Peristeri Vikos Cola	91–59	62–66	157–121
Larisa	87–68	76–75	162–144
Lavrio Aegean Cargo	94–97	78–70	164–175
Ionikos	81–74	68–81	162–142
Panathinaikos	95–104	80–75	170–184
PAOK	76–56	85–87	163–141
Promitheas Patras	75–82	80–78	153–162
Iraklis	100–97	72–79	179–169

==== Quarterfinals ====
Win Loss

11 May 2021 1st Round	AEK	102–89	PAOK	Athens
20:00 (EET)
		Boxscore		Arena: Nikos Galis Olympic Indoor Hall

13 May 2021 2nd Round	PAOK	81–73	AEK	Thessaloniki
20:00 (EET)
		Boxscore		Arena: PAOK Sports Arena

16 May 2021 3rd Round	AEK	87–81	PAOK	Athens
17:00 (EET)
		Boxscore		Arena: Nikos Galis Olympic Indoor Hall

==== Semifinals ====
Win Loss

19 May 2021 1st Round	Panathinaikos	78–72	AEK	Athens
21:15 (EET)
		Boxscore		Arena: Nikos Galis Olympic Indoor Hall

21 May 2021 2nd Round	AEK	92–80	Panathinaikos	Athens
21:15 (EET)
		Boxscore		Arena: Nikos Galis Olympic Indoor Hall

23 May 2021 3rd Round	Panathinaikos	94–83	AEK	Athens
21:00 (EET)
		Boxscore		Arena: Nikos Galis Olympic Indoor Hall

26 May 2021 4th Round	AEK	71–78	Panathinaikos	Athens
20:00 (EET)
		Boxscore		Arena: Nikos Galis Olympic Indoor Hall

==== Consolation finals ====
Win Loss

2 June 2021 1st Round	Promitheas	77–73	AEK	Patras
19:00 (EET)
		Boxscore		Arena: Dimitris Tofalos Arena

4 June 2021 2nd Round	AEK	113–101	Promitheas	Athens
19:00 (EET)
		Boxscore		Arena: Nikos Galis Olympic Indoor Hall

6 June 2021 3rd Round	Promitheas	80–81	AEK	Patras
19:00 (EET)
		Boxscore		Arena: Dimitris Tofalos Arena

9 June 2021 4th Round	AEK	95–72	Promitheas	Athens
20:00 (EET)
		Boxscore		Arena: Nikos Galis Olympic Indoor Hall

=== Greek Cup ===
Win Loss

Quarterfinals

10 February 2021 Quarterfinal	Lavrio	90–85	AEK	Lavrio
21:00 (EET)
		Boxscore

=== Greek Super Cup ===
Win Loss

Final-4

23 September 2020 Semi-final	Promitheas	98–88	AEK	Athens
16:30 (EET)
		Boxscore

24 September 2020 Consolation final	AEK	73–79	Panathinaikos	Athens
16:30 (EET)
		Boxscore

=== FIBA Champions League ===
==== Regular season - Group C ====
Pos	Team	Pld	W	L	PF	PA	PD	Pts	Qualification	HOL	AEK	CHO	TSM
1	(Israel) Hapoel Holon	6	4	2	479	455	+24	10	Advance to Playoffs	—	77–71	73–63	69–79
2	(Greece) AEK	6	4	2	514	492	+22	10	Advance to Playoffs	100–96	—	83–81	95–69
3	(France) Cholet	6	2	4	458	468	−10	8		71–89	79–70	—	89–71
4	(Belarus) Tsmoki-Minsk	6	2	4	462	498	−36	8		71–75	90–95	82–75	—

Source: Champions League
Legend: Blue = home team win; Red = away team win.

==== Results summary ====
Overall						Home					Away				
Pld	W	L	PF	PA	PD	W	L	PF	PA	PD	W	L	PF	PA	PD
6	4	2	514	492	+22	3	0	278	246	+32	1	2	236	246	−10

Last updated: January 20, 2021.
Source: BCL Group C Results

==== Results by round ====
Round	1	2	3	4	5	6
Ground	H	H	H	A	A	A
Result	W	W	W	L	L	W
Position	1	1	1	1	2	2

Updated to match(es) played on January 20, 2021. Source: BCL Group C Fixtures
A = Away; H = Home; W = Win; D = Draw; L = Loss

==== Regular season ====
Win Loss

11 November 2020 1	AEK Athens (Greece)	95–69	(Belarus) Tsmoki-Minsk	Athens
19:30 (EET)
		Boxscore

4 November 2020 2	AEK Athens (Greece)	100–96	(Israel) Hapoel Holon	Athens
19:30 (EET)
		Boxscore		Arena: Nikos Galis Olympic Indoor Hall

17 November 2020 3	AEK Athens (Greece)	83–81	(France) Cholet	Athens
19:30 (EET)
		Boxscore		Arena: Nikos Galis Olympic Indoor Hall

15 December 2020 4	Cholet (France)	79–70	(Greece) AEK Athens	Cholet
19:00 (EET)
		Boxscore		Arena: La Meilleraie

5 January 2021 5	Hapoel Holon (Israel)	77–71	(Greece) AEK Athens	Holon
18:00 (EET)
		Boxscore		Arena: Holon Toto Hall

20 January 2021 6	Tsmoki-Minsk (Belarus)	90–95	(Greece) AEK Athens	Minsk
19:30 (EET)
		Boxscore		Arena: Minsk-Arena

==== Results overview ====
Win Loss

Opposition	Home score	Away score	Double
(Israel) Hapoel Holon	100–96	77–71	171–175
(Belarus) Tsmoki-Minsk	95–69	90–95	190–159
(France) Cholet Basket	83–81	79–70	153–160

==== Playoffs - Group K ====
Pos	Team	Pld	W	L	PF	PA	PD	Pts	Qualification	NIZ	SIG	AEK	TTE
1	(Russia) Nizhny Novgorod	6	4	2	506	457	+49	10	Advance to Final Eight	—	87–97	88–60	96–82
2	(France) SIG Strasbourg	6	3	3	491	474	+17	9	Advance to Final Eight	68–73	—	91–73	91–81
3	(Greece) AEK	6	3	3	429	468	−39	9		79–78	77–68	—	74–65
4	(Turkey) Türk Telekom	6	2	4	460	487	−27	8		71–84	83–76	78–66	—

Source: Champions League
Legend: Blue = home team win; Red = away team win.

==== Results summary ====
Overall						Home					Away				
Pld	W	L	PF	PA	PD	W	L	PF	PA	PD	W	L	PF	PA	PD
6	3	3	429	468	−39	3	0	230	211	+19	0	3	199	257	−58

Last updated: April 7, 2021.
Source: BCL Group K Results

==== Results by round ====
Round	1	2	3	4	5	6
Ground	A	H	H	A	A	H
Result	L	W	W	L	L	W
Position	4	1	2	2	4	3

Updated to match(es) played on April 7, 2021. Source: BCL Group K Fixtures
A = Away; H = Home; W = Win; D = Draw; L = Loss

==== Playoffs ====
Win Loss

25 March 2021 1	Nizhny Novgorod (Russia)	88–60	(Greece) AEK Athens	Nizhny Novgorod
18:00 (EET)
		Boxscore		Arena: CEC Nagorny

10 March 2021 2	AEK Athens (Greece)	74–65	(Turkey) Türk Telekom	Athens
20:00 (EET)
		Boxscore		Arena: Nikos Galis Olympic Indoor Hall

16 March 2021 3	AEK Athens (Greece)	77–68	(France) SIG Strasbourg	Athens
19:30 (EET)
		Boxscore		Arena: Nikos Galis Olympic Indoor Hall

23 March 2021 4	SIG Strasbourg (France)	91–73	(Greece) AEK Athens	Strasbourg
21:30 (EET)
		Boxscore		Arena: Rhénus Sport

31 March 2021 5	Türk Telekom (Turkey)	78–66	(Greece) AEK Athens	Ankara
19:00 (EET)
		Boxscore		Arena: Ankara Arena

7 April 2021 6	AEK Athens (Greece)	79–78	(Russia) Nizhny Novgorod	Athens
19:30 (EET)
		Boxscore		Arena: Nikos Galis Olympic Indoor Hall

==== Results overview ====
Win Loss

Opposition	Home score	Away score	Double
(Russia) Nizhny Novgorod	79–78	88–60	139–170
(France) SIG Strasbourg	77–68	91–73	150–159
(Turkey) Türk Telekom	74–65	78–66	140–143
