= Dinos Mitoglou =

Greek basketball player (born 1996)

Dinos Mitoglou Ντίνος Μήτογλου
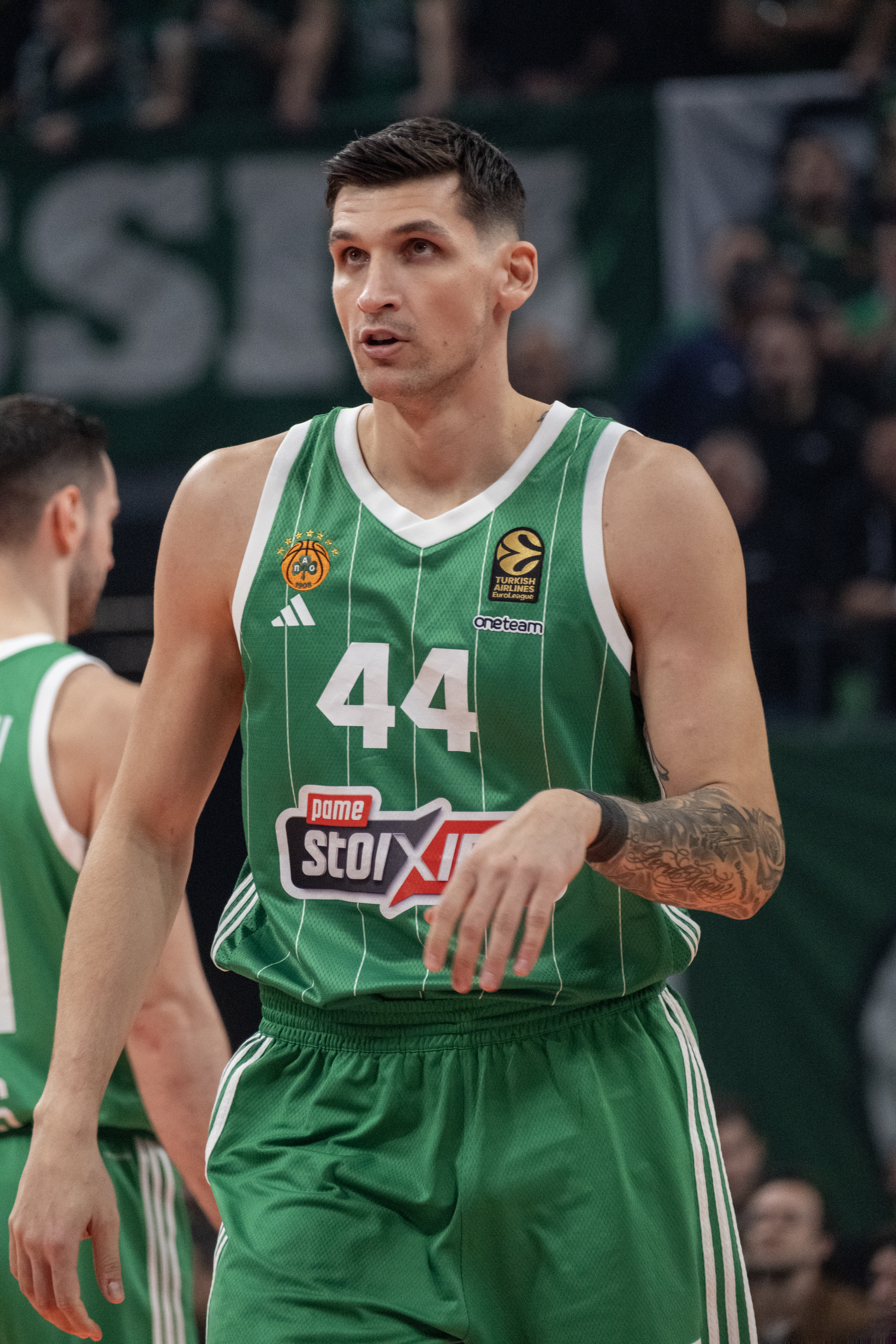
- Mitoglou with Panathinaikos in 2025

No. 44 – Panathinaikos
- Position: Center / power forward
- League: Greek Basketball League; EuroLeague

Personal information
- Born: June 11, 1996 (age 30) Thessaloniki, Greece
- Listed height: 2.10 m (6 ft 11 in)
- Listed weight: 110 kg (243 lb)

Career information
- High school: Aristoteleio College (Thessaloniki, Greece)
- College: Wake Forest (2014–2017)
- NBA draft: 2018: undrafted
- Playing career: 2013–present

Career history
- 2013–2014: Aris Thessaloniki
- 2017–2021: Panathinaikos
- 2021–2022: Olimpia Milano
- 2023–present: Panathinaikos

Career highlights
- EuroLeague champion (2024); Lega Serie A champion (2022); Italian Cup winner (2022); 5× Greek League champion (2018–2021, 2024); 4× Greek Cup winner (2019, 2021, 2025, 2026); All-Greek League Team (2021); Greek League All-Star (2020); Greek All-Star Game MVP (2020); Greek Cup Finals Top Scorer (2024)
Medals
Event	1st	2nd	3rd
FIBA EuroBasket	0	0	1
Total	0	0	1
Men's basketball
Representing Greece
EuroBasket
Bronze medal – third place	2025 Cyprus–Finland–Poland–Latvia	

Konstantinos "Dinos" Mitoglou (Greek: Κωνσταντίνος "Ντίνος" Μήτογλου; born June 11, 1996) is a Greek professional basketball player for Panathinaikos of the Greek Basketball League (GBL) and the EuroLeague. He played college basketball at Wake Forest University. He is a 2.10 m (6 ft 10 3/4 in) tall power forward, who can occasionally play as a center.

== Early career ==
After playing with the youth teams of the Greek clubs Asteria Academy and Aris, Mitoglou played for the first time in Greece's top-tier level, the Greek Basket League, with the senior men's team of Aris Thessaloniki, during the 2013–14 season. He made his debut in the Greek Basket League, on 30 November 2013, in a game against Olympiacos. With Aris, he played in a total of 3 games, during the Greek Basket League 2013–14 season.

Despite playing in Greece's top-tier level professional basketball league, Mitoglou was able to retain his amateur status, thus making him eligible to play college basketball.

== College career ==
Mitoglou played 3 years of NCAA Division I college basketball at Wake Forest from 2014 to 2017. In 3 years at Wake Forest, he appeared in 96 games, of which 75 were starts, and averaged 9.3 points and 5.4 rebounds per game.

== Professional career ==
=== Aris Thessaloniki (2013–2014) ===
Mitoglou played with the Greek Basket League club Aris, during the 2013–14 season.

=== Wake Forest (2014–2017) ===
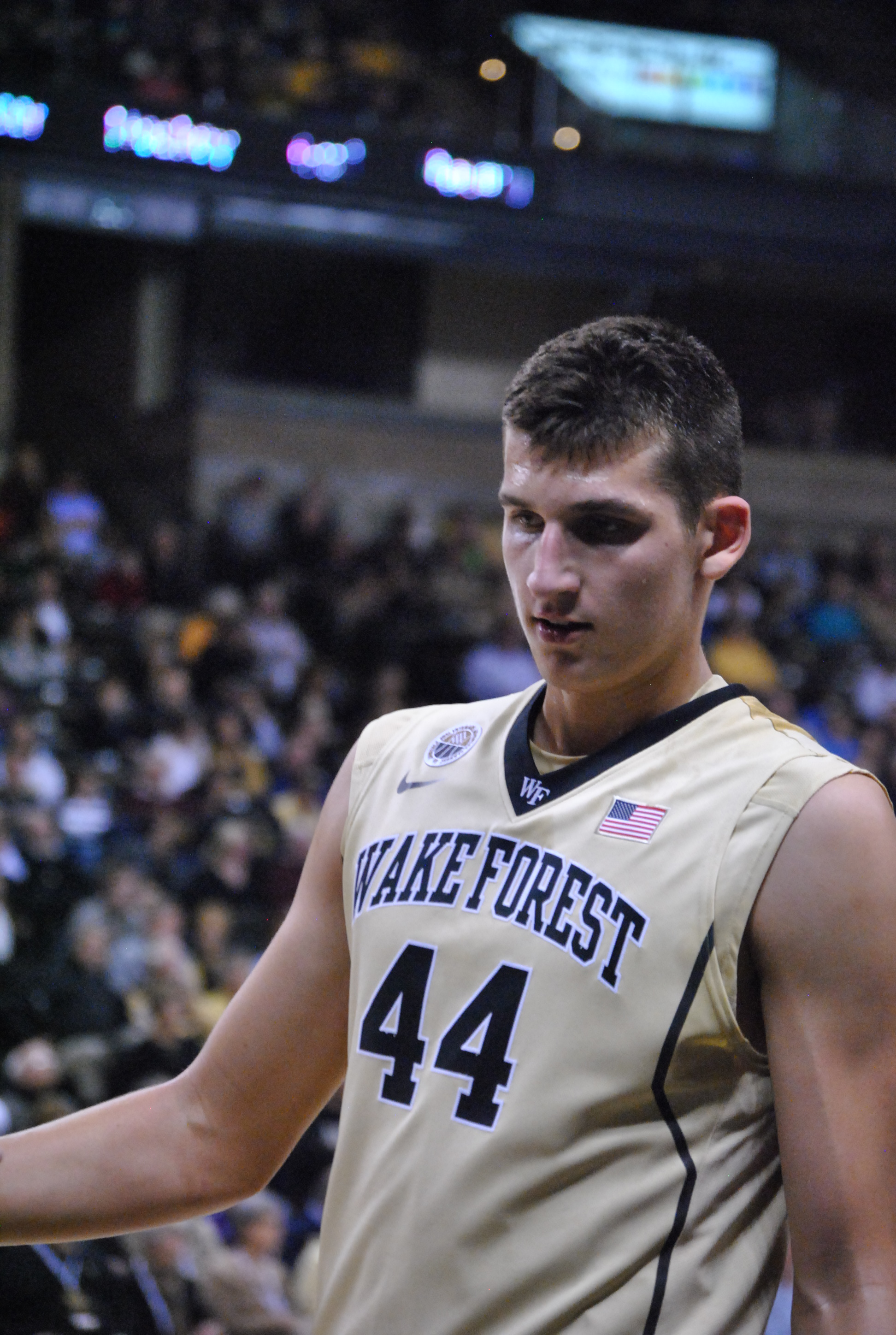
Mitoglou with Wake Forest in 2014

He then moved to Wake Forest University, but Aris retained his club rights, through the year 2017. Mitoglou spent the next 3 seasons playing D1 college basketball. He left Wake Forest after his junior season, to turn professional.

=== Panathinaikos (2017–2021) ===
After leaving Wake Forest, Mitoglou signed a 4-year contract with the Greek club Panathinaikos. The contract was worth $2 million in net income.

=== Olimpia Milano (2021–2022) ===
On June 25, 2021, Mitoglou signed a two-year deal with Italian powerhouse Olimpia Milano worth 1.8 million Euros.

From March 2022 until July 2023, Mitoglou was involved in a major doping scandal involving unlicensed pharmaceuticals. On March 9, 2023, Dinos Mitoglou officially received a 32-month suspension from FIBA. On July 5, 2023, the Court of Arbitration for Sport convened in Switzerland and reduced his sentence to 16 months, i.e. Mitoglou would be available to participate in FIBA sporting events from July 28, 2023, and henceforth.

=== Doping Suspension (2022) ===
In March 2022, while playing for EA7 Emporio Armani Milan, Dinos Mitoglou tested positive for the banned substance metandienone following an anti-doping control after a EuroLeague game against Panathinaikos. As a result, he was initially handed a 32-month suspension by FIBA, effective until November 2024. Mitoglou appealed the decision, and in July 2023, the Court of Arbitration for Sport (CAS) reduced his suspension to 16 months, allowing him to return to professional basketball on July 28, 2023.

Mitoglou claimed that he had been administered the substance by a Greek doctor who assured him it was a "miracle drug from Russia" that would help cleanse his body. The doctor was later arrested by Greek police for involvement in several doping cases.

=== Panathinaikos (2023–present) ===
On July 6, 2023, Dinos Mitoglou officially rejoined Panathinaikos on a multi-year deal, marking his return to the club after a season with EA7 Emporio Armani Milan. The announcement came shortly after a reduction in his antidoping suspension, making him eligible to return to practice.

Since his return, Mitoglou has been a pivotal figure for Panathinaikos, contributing significantly to both domestic and European successes. In the 2023–24 season, he played a crucial role in the team's EuroLeague championship victory, showcasing his versatility and leadership on the court.

One of his standout performances came during a EuroLeague playoff game against Anadolu Efes in April 2025. Responding to a public challenge from head coach Ergin Ataman, Mitoglou delivered a season-high performance, contributing significantly to Panathinaikos' 81–77 victory, which gave them a 2–1 lead in the series.

On October 29, 2025, Mitoglou renewed his contract with Panathinaikos through 2029.

== National team career ==
=== Greek junior national team ===
Mitoglou played with the junior national teams of Greece. With Greece's junior national teams, he played at the 2012 FIBA Europe Under-16 Championship, the 2013 FIBA Europe Under-18 Championship, the 2014 FIBA Europe Under-18 Championship, and the 2015 FIBA Under-19 World Cup.

=== Greek senior national team ===
Mitoglou became a member of the senior Greek national basketball team in 2017. He played at the 2019 FIBA World Cup qualification, the 2020 Victoria FIBA World Olympic Qualifying Tournament as well as the 2024 Olympic Games .

== Career statistics ==
Legend
GP	Games played	GS	Games started	MPG	Minutes per game
FG%	Field-goal percentage	3P%	3-point field-goal percentage	FT%	Free-throw percentage
RPG	Rebounds per game	APG	Assists per game	SPG	Steals per game
BPG	Blocks per game	PPG	Points per game	PIR	Performance index rating
**Bold**	Career high

=== EuroLeague ===
†	Denotes season in which Mitoglou won the EuroLeague
*	Led the league
§	Partially suspended due to a doping violation

Year	Team	GP	GS	MPG	FG%	3P%	FT%	RPG	APG	SPG	BPG	PPG	PIR
2017–18	Panathinaikos	4	0	3.0	.000	.000	.500	.8	.5	.3	—	.8	.5
2018–19	Panathinaikos	27	10	13.8	**.510**	.200	.550	3.0	.3	.3	.1	4.2	4.0
2019–20	Panathinaikos	28*	5	13.9	.508	.296	.761	3.7	.5	**.9**	.3	5.8	7.2
2020–21	Panathinaikos	34	23	20.3	.504	.295	.713	5.4	.9	.7	.3	9.3	11.3
2021–22^{§}	Olimpia Milano	13	1	17.5	.471	.296	**.818**	4.2	**1.2**	.8	.4	7.6	9.2
2023–24†	Panathinaikos	38	**35**	**28.2**	.483	.345	.745	**6.2**	.9	.8	.4	**11.3**	**13.4**
2024–25	Panathinaikos	**39**	13	16.2	.497	**.430**	.666	2.9	.6	.5	.1	6.0	5.6
Career		183	87	18.5	.429	.331	.714	4.2	.7	.6	.2	7.4	8.4

=== Domestic leagues ===
Year	Team	League	GP	MPG	FG%	3P%	FT%	RPG	APG	SPG	BPG	PPG
2013–14	(Greece) Aris Thessaloniki	GBL	3	3.1	.250	—	**1.000**	1.0	—	.3	—	1.3
2017–18	(Greece) Panathinaikos	GBL	**32**	12.8	.569	**.464**	.607	3.8	.5	.3	.3	5.6
2018–19	(Greece) Panathinaikos	GBL	27	14.3	.535	.353	.593	4.4	.7	.5	.4	6.4
2019–20	(Greece) Panathinaikos	GBL	20	19.9	.541	.441	.753	**7.4**	.9	.9	**1.0**	**11.5**
2020–21	(Greece) Panathinaikos	GBL	29	20.0	.568	.440	.788	6.4	**1.2**	**1.1**	.7	11.3
2021–22^{§}	(Italy) Olimpia Milano	LBA	11	20.5	**.575**	.353	.792	6.3	**1.2**	.8	.3	11.4
2023–24	(Greece) Panathinaikos	GBL	**32**	**22.1**	.502	.354	.775	6.1	1.1	.8	.5	10.2
2023–24	(Greece) Panathinaikos	GBL	29	17.4	.534	.298	.618	4.8	1.4	.8	.5	9.1

=== College ===
Year	Team	GP	GS	MPG	FG%	3P%	FT%	RPG	APG	SPG	BPG	PPG
2014–15	Wake Forest	32	13	22.3	**.442**	**.385**	.718	4.6	.4	.5	.6	**9.7**
2015–16	Wake Forest	31	30	23.8	.427	.318	.767	5.4	.7	.5	**.8**	9.2
2016–17	Wake Forest	**33**	**32**	**24.6**	.421	.333	**.792**	**6.1**	**.9**	**.6**	.7	8.9
Career		96	75	23.6	.430	.347	.763	5.4	.7	.5	.7	9.3

== Personal life ==
Mitoglou's father, Dimitrios Mitoglou, was a professional football player, that played with PAOK and Doxa Drama. His brother, Gerasimos Mitoglou is also a professional football player.
