= Georgios Kalaitzakis =

Greek basketball player (born 1999)

Georgios Kalaitzakis Γιώργος Καλαϊτζάκης
No. 16 – Promitheas Patras
- Position: Small forward
- League: GBL; BCL

Personal information
- Born: January 2, 1999 (age 27) Heraklion, Crete, Greece
- Listed height: 6 ft 7 in (2.01 m)
- Listed weight: 209 lb (95 kg)

Career information
- NBA draft: 2021: 2nd round, 60th overall pick
- Drafted by: Indiana Pacers
- Playing career: 2016–present

Career history
- 2016–2021: Panathinaikos
- 2019–2020: →Nevėžis
- 2021: Milwaukee Bucks
- 2021: →Wisconsin Herd
- 2021–2022: Oklahoma City Blue
- 2022: Oklahoma City Thunder
- 2022–2023: Panathinaikos
- 2023–2024: Tigers Tübingen
- 2024–2025: Lietkabelis
- 2025–2026: Maroussi
- 2026–present: Promitheas Patras

Career highlights
- 4× Greek League champion (2017–2019, 2021); 4× Greek Cup winner (2016, 2017, 2019, 2021)
- Stats at NBA.com
- Stats at Basketball Reference

Georgios Kalaitzakis (Greek: Γιώργος Καλαϊτζάκης [ʝeˈoɾʝi.os kala.iˈd͡zacis]; born January 2, 1999) is a Greek professional basketball player for Promitheas Patras of the Greek Basketball League (GBL) and the Basketball Champions League (BCL). He is a 2.01 m (6 ft 7 in) tall small forward. As a teenager, Kalaitzakis used to be regarded as one of the top young European prospects in his age range.

== Professional career ==
=== Panathinaikos (2016–2021) ===
After playing with the junior youth clubs of Aris, Kalaitzakis began his professional career in 2016, with the Greek club Panathinaikos. With Panathinaikos, he won the Greek Cup title in 2016, 2017, and 2019, and also the Greek League championship, in 2017, 2018 and 2019.

In March 2018, Kalaitzakis announced his intention to declare for the 2018 NBA draft. He later withdrew from the draft before the draft's withdrawal deadline.

==== Nevėžis (2019–2020) ====
On August 28, 2019, Kalaitzakis signed with Nevėžis Kėdainiai of the Lithuanian Basketball League, on a loan deal from Panathinaikos. In 23 games played in the Lithuanian league's 2019–20 season, he averaged 12.2 points, 4.3 rebounds, 2.3 assists and 1 steal in 28.7 minutes per game.

In April 2020, Kalaitzakis declared for the 2020 NBA draft. However, he withdrew before the draft took place.

==== Return to Panathinaikos (2020–2021) ====
On August 11, 2020, Kalaitzakis re-signed with Panathinaikos through the end of the 2021–2022 season. With Panathinaikos, he went on to win both the 2020–21 Greek Cup title and the 2020–21 Greek Basket League championship.

=== Milwaukee Bucks (2021) ===
Kalaitzakis was selected by the NBA's Indiana Pacers, with the 60th overall pick of the 2021 NBA draft. His draft rights were then traded to the Milwaukee Bucks, along with the draft rights of the 54th pick, Sandro Mamukelashvili, and two second-round draft picks, for Isaiah Todd. Kalaitzakis' contract with Panathinaikos had a buyout amount of $300,000, which was paid by the Bucks.

On August 11, 2021, the Milwaukee Bucks announced that they had signed Kalaitzakis. Kalaitzakis made his debut in the NBA on October 19, coming-off from bench with two rebounds in a 127–104 win over the Brooklyn Nets. On December 3, he was waived by the Bucks after nine appearances.

=== Oklahoma City Thunder / Blue (2021–2022) ===
On December 30, 2021, Kalaitzakis was claimed off waivers by the Oklahoma City Blue of the NBA G League where he played in 31 regular season games and averaged 10.1 points, 3.9 rebounds and 2.1 assists in 19.6 minutes per game. On April 5, 2022, he signed with the Oklahoma City Thunder for the rest of the season. Kalaitzakis played four games (all starts) for the Thunder, averaging 41.5 minutes and 17.5 points per game.

=== Second stint with Panathinaikos (2022–2023) ===
On July 25, 2022, Kalaitzakis signed a two-year contract with Panathinaikos, returning to Greece and reuniting with his twin brother Panos. In 26 EuroLeague games (16 starts), he averaged 2 points and 1.1 rebounds in 10 minutes per contest. Additionally, in 29 domestic league matches, he averaged 6.4 points, 1.8 rebounds and 1.2 assists in 13 minutes per contest.

On September 4, 2023, Kalaitzakis was released from the Greek powerhouse.

=== Tigers Tübingen (2023–2024) ===
On December 7, 2023, Kalaitzakis signed a one-year contract with Tigers Tübingen of the German Basketball Bundesliga.

=== Lietkabelis Panevėžys (2024–2025) ===
On July 5, 2024, Kalaitzakis signed a one-year deal with Lietkabelis Panevėžys of the Lithuanian Basketball League (LKL) and the EuroCup.

=== Maroussi (2025–2026) ===
On July 28, 2025, Kalaitzakis returned to Greece, signing a two-year deal with Maroussi.

=== Promitheas Patras (2026–present) ===
On August 24, 2026, Kalaitzakis signed with Promitheas Patras of the Greek Basketball League (GBL) and the Basketball Champions League (BCL).

== National team career ==
Kalaitzakis was a member of the junior national teams of Greece. With Greece's junior national teams, he played at the 2015 FIBA Europe Under-16 Championship, the 2016 FIBA Europe Under-18 Championship, and the 2017 FIBA Europe Under-18 Championship. He also played at the 2018 FIBA Europe Under-20 Championship, and the 2019 FIBA Europe Under-20 Championship, which he led in scoring, with an average of 19.7 points per game.

== Career statistics ==
Legend
GP	Games played	GS	Games started	MPG	Minutes per game
FG%	Field goal percentage	3P%	3-point field goal percentage	FT%	Free throw percentage
RPG	Rebounds per game	APG	Assists per game	SPG	Steals per game
BPG	Blocks per game	PPG	Points per game	**Bold**	Career high

=== NBA ===
Year	Team	GP	GS	MPG	FG%	3P%	FT%	RPG	APG	SPG	BPG	PPG
2021–22	Milwaukee	**9**	0	5.3	.455	**.500**	.444	.9	.0	.1	.1	1.8
2021–22	Oklahoma City	4	**4**	**41.4**	**.464**	.364	**.476**	**3.3**	**3.0**	**2.5**	**.3**	**17.5**
Career		13	4	16.4	.463	.385	.467	1.6	.9	.8	.2	6.6

=== EuroLeague ===
Year	Team	GP	GS	MPG	FG%	3P%	FT%	RPG	APG	SPG	BPG	PPG	PIR
2017–18	Panathinaikos	1	0	1.0	—	—	—	—	—	—	—	0.0	0.0
2018–19	Panathinaikos	1	0	2.0	.000	.000	—	—	—	—	—	0.0	-3.0
2020–21	Panathinaikos	14	3	4.4	**.462**	**.500**	**.909**	.6	.1	.2	**.1**	1.6	1.1
2022–23	Panathinaikos	**26**	**16**	**9.8**	.347	.211	.636	**1.1**	**.3**	**.6**	**.1**	**2.0**	**1.5**
Career		42	19	7.6	.359	.227	.727	.9	.3	.4	.1	1.8	1.2

== Personal life ==
Kalaitzakis' twin brother Panos is a professional basketball player and had been Georgios' teammate in both the Lithuanian club Nevėžis Kėdainiai as well as Panathinaikos. Their younger sibling Alexandros (born 2003) also plays basketball professionally.
