= Promitheas Patras B.C. =

Greek basketball club

Promitheas Patras
- Leagues: Greek Basketball League; Europe Cup
- Founded: 1985; 41 years ago (Parent Athletic Club); 1986; 40 years ago (Men's Basketball Club)
- History: Promitheas Patras B.C. 1986–present
- Arena: Dimitris Tofalos Arena
- Capacity: 5,500
- Location: Patras, Greece
- Team colors: Black, White, and Orange
- Main sponsor: Coffee Island
- President: Christos Milas
- Head coach: Georgios Vovoras
- Ownership: Evangelos Liolios
- Championships: 1 Greek Super Cup
- Website: promitheasbc.gr
Home	Away	EC Home
EC Away

Promitheas Patras B.C. (Greek: Προμηθέας Πατρών K.A.E.) is a Greek professional basketball club that is based in Patras, Greece. The club currently competes in the Greek Basket League and the Basketball Champions League. Promitheas also previously competed in the EuroCup for four seasons, reaching the quarter-finals twice. It is one of Patras' prominent basketball clubs, along with Apollon.

The basketball club is the main part of the Greek multi-sports club A.S. Promitheas Patras. The club's full name can be rendered as either A.S.P. Promitheas B.C., or A.S. Promitheas Patras B.C. With the acronym "A.S." standing for "Athlitikos Syllogos" (meaning: Athletic Club / Sports Club, in Greek: Αθλητικός Σύλλογος).

The club is named after Prometheus, one of the most well-known Greek mythological Titans, and the flame representing the fire knowledge he gave to people is the club's emblem (logo). The club is owned by Dr. Evangelos Liolios, who is also the owner of the Greek coffee company, Coffee Island, and managed by Christos Milas.

== History ==
=== Rise of the club ===
The parent athletic club of A.S. Promitheas Patras was founded in 1985. The men's basketball section of the club was started in the 1986–87 season. From 1986 to 2013, the club competed in the local and regional basketball leagues of Greece.

Promitheas competed in one of Greece's national categories for the first time, in the 2013–14 season, when the club played in the Greek C League (4th Division). In that season, the team won the 4th Division's 3rd Group, with a record of 21–3, and thus earned a league promotion to the next higher league level. Prometheus competed in the Greek B League (3rd Division) in the 2014–15 season. That season, they won the 3rd Division's 2nd Group, with a record of 24–2, and thus once again earned a league promotion.

=== 2015–16 season ===
Promitheas Patras played in the Greek A2 League (2nd Division), during the 2015–16 season. They finished the season with a record of 24–14 (regular season & playoffs), and finished in 3rd place overall in the league. After the season, they were granted a league promotion to the first tier Greek League, for the following 2016–17 season.

In the 2015–16 edition of the Greek Cup, Promitheas made it to the Last 16 stage.

=== 2016–17 season ===
Promitheas Patras played in the top-tier level Greek Basket League for the first time, in the 2016–17 season. They finished the season in 9th place in the league standings, with a record of 10–16. During that same season, the club also participated in the 2016–17 Greek Cup competition, in which they finished in 10th place, after defeating Trikala Aries and Doukas on the road, and then losing to Koroivos, on the road, in Amaliada.

=== 2017–18 season ===
In the 2017–18 Greek Basket League season, the technical leadership of Promitheas Patras was taken over by the club's sports director Makis Giatras. Giatras was flanked by the team's assistant coaches Eleftheriadis, Douvas and Souflias, the team's trainer Lapsanis, and the team's manager Kostas Rakintzis. For that season, the team also renewed its contracts with players Gkikas, Geromichalos, Gravas, and Faye.

The club also signed several new players: Toutziarakis, Saloustros, Dimakos, Releford, Evans, Lypovyy, Milošević, Hall, Ellis, Murry, and Prather. They finished the season in 4th place overall in the league standings, with a record of 19–15 (regular season & playoffs). That same season, the team also participated in the 2017–18 Greek Cup competition, in which they again finished in 10th place, after beating Koroivos and Lavrio, but then losing to Kolossos Rodou.

=== 2018–19 season ===
Promitheas Patras directly joined the last 16 stage of the 2018–19 Greek Cup competition, where they faced Aris Thessaloniki. They won that game in Patras, by a score of 86–65, and thus proceeded to the Greek Cup's Top 8 phase. At that phase, they came up against Panathinaikos Athens - the eventual winners of the Greek Cup, and were defeated by a score of 76–68.

After completing the 2018–19 Greek Basket League's regular season, Promitheas finished in 4th place in the league's regular season standings. In the league's playoff quarterfinals, Promitheas beat PAOK Thessaloniki twice (81–66 and 76–68), and they qualified to the league's semifinals. In a dramatic five game semifinals playoff series, Promitheas earned a memorable victory against AEK Athens, by beating them on their home court, in the series' final game (85–84 in O.T.). After winning the series 3–2, Promitheas became the first Greek provincial team to qualify to the league's finals, and also managed to make it to the Greek League's playoff finals, for the first time in the club's history. In the Greek League Finals, they played against Panathinaikos Athens, and lost the series 3–0.

Moreover, also in the 2018–19 season, Promitheas debuted in European-wide club competitions by participating in the European secondary level FIBA Champions League, and making it to the competition's Round of 16. The Italian club Virtus Bologna, the Turkish club Beşiktaş İstanbul, the Lithuanian club Neptūnas Klaipėda, the French club SIG Strasbourg, the Belgian club Oostende, the German club Medi Bayreuth and the Slovenian club Olimpija Ljubljana were drawn as the opponents of Promitheas for the Champions League's phase of 32. With a record of 8 wins and 6 losses, Promitheas finished in 4^{th} place in the group standings, and booked a ticket to the competition's knockout phase of 16.

At the knockout phase of 16, Promitheas faced the Spanish club Iberostar Tenerife, and managed to grab a 69–57 win in the first phase of the two-legged playoff series. After losing the first game of the series by 12 points in Patras, the Spanish club had an admirable reaction in the next game, and prevailed over Promitheas by 22 points (79–57) in the second game, and thus won the series by an aggregate score of 136–126.

The most productive scorers for Promitheas Patras in the FIBA Champions League were Rion Brown (214 points in 14 games, 15.3 on average), Tony Meier (193 points in 16 games, 12.1 on average), Leonidas Kaselakis (109 points in 12 games, 9.1 on average), Nikos Gkikas (134 points in 15 games, 8.9 on average), Oleksandr Lypovyy (104 points in 14 games, 7.4 on average), and Michalis Tsairelis (109 points in 16 games, 6.8 on average). Overall, the team recorded 79.3 points, 32.9 rebounds, and 18.8 assists per game on average.

=== 2019–20 season ===
Promitheas competed in the European secondary level EuroCup, for the first time in the EuroCup 2019–20 season. They are the Super Cup winners of 2020, beating Peristeri BC in the final.

== Arenas and training facilities ==
=== Dimitris Tofalos Arena ===
Promitheas Patras previously played their home games at the 1,500 seat A.E.P. Indoor Hall. The club currently plays its home games at the Dimitris Tofalos Arena, an indoor sports arena that is located in the Proastio neighborhood of Patras. It is also known by its original official name, which is PEAK, which stands for Pampeloponnisiako Ethniko Athlitiko Kentro Patron. The arena has a seating capacity of 4,200 people for basketball games.

=== Kastellokampos Training Center ===
Promitheas Patras' training facility, the Kastellokampos Training Center, was opened to the club's athletes and fans in September 2018. It is located in the Patras suburb of Kastellokampos. It is considered to be one of the most modern and complete basketball training centers in Europe, and is also home to one of the top level basketball academies in Europe. It comprises an area of 2,500 square meters, and contains three basketball courts, a state-of-the-art fitness center, and an ergo-metrics laboratory (Promitheas Lab). The training center is also regularly used to host youth basketball competitions and cultural events.

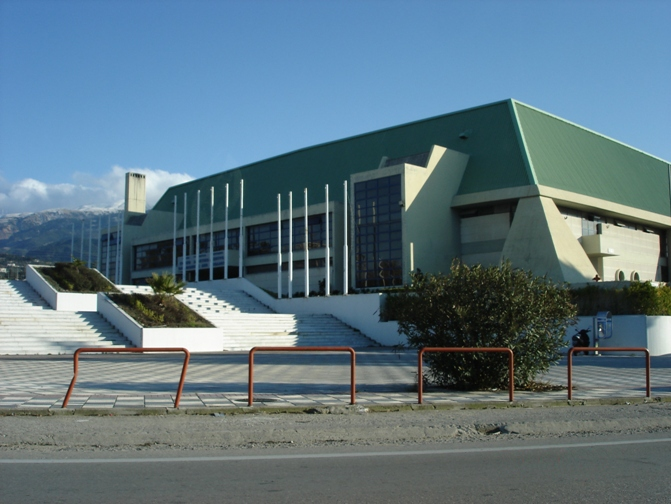
Dimitris Tofalos Arena Exterior

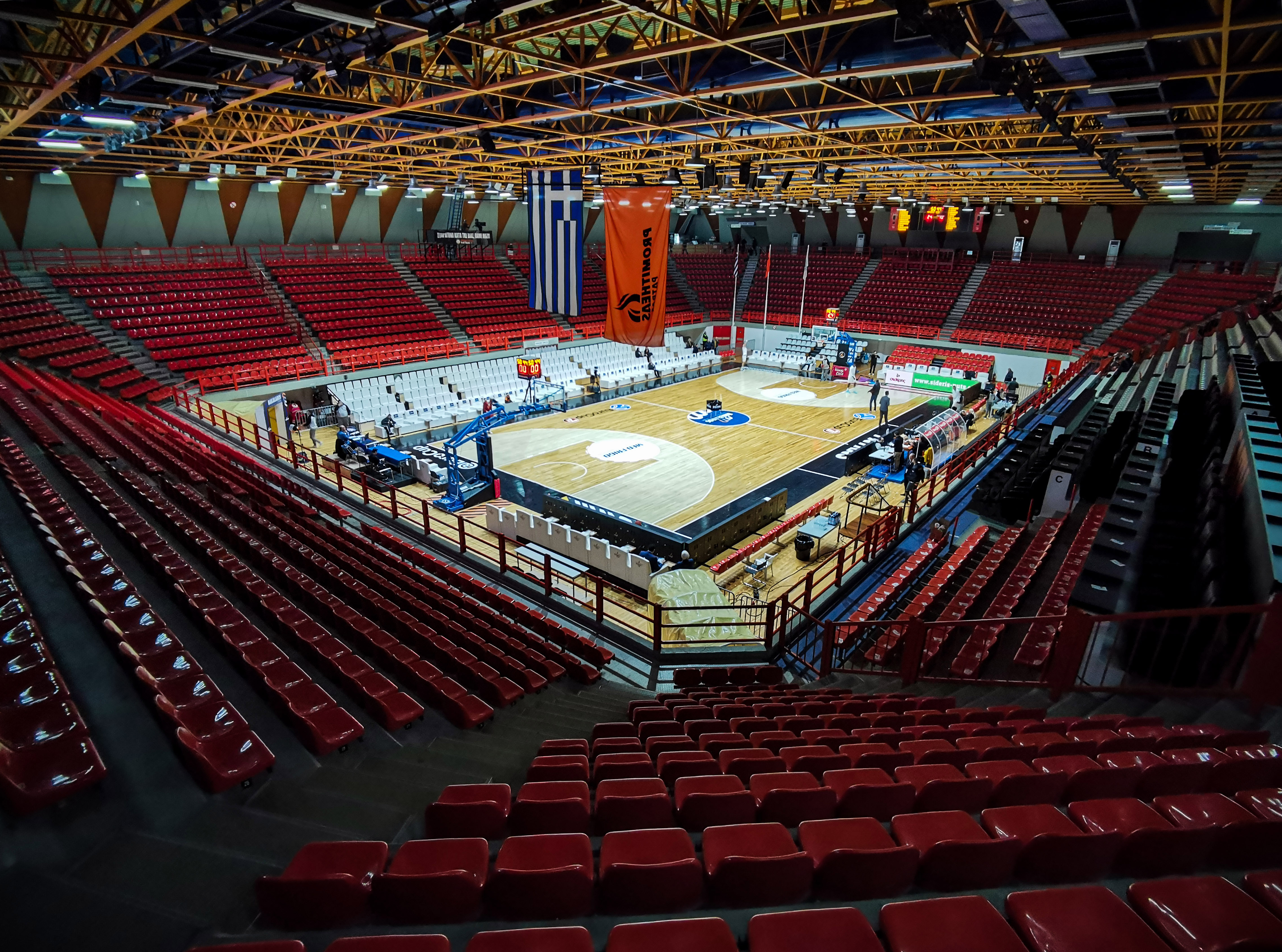
Dimitris Tofalos Arena Interior

== Promitheas Patras Youth Development Program ==
Since the summer of 2014, Promitheas Patras has run a "Youth Development Program" of sports scholarships. The program's aim is to combine sports with education, and to help children with sports talent, physical and athletic skills, and a willingness to compete in sports, to be able to combine both sports and education; by using and maximizing their athletic capabilities, while at the same time, maintaining their school performance. It includes children who are at secondary school age, and that have special abilities in the sport of basketball.

For the club's youth academy athletes, diligence in their school lessons is a prerequisite. For those children, ASP Promitheas created the "NOUS" scholarship program. The program's scholarship includes full financial coverage of the expenses by the club's association for: the athlete's accommodations in Patras (in the hostel of Dim. & Lilis Stavropoulou, located in Kastellokampos, Patras, in air conditioned student dormitories), their daily nutritional needs, their transportation needs, their sports clothing, and their education. The club also covers the tuition fees of the youth athletes, at Kotronis Schools, in Nafpaktos, which is the region's top secondary level educational institution.

The Promitheas Youth Development Program has enjoyed multiple successes, having finished in 2nd place in the Panou Schools competition in Kavala, in 2016, in 3rd place in the 2017 Nicosia Schools competition, and in 1st place in the 2018 Archaia Olympia Schools competition, at the Panhellenic Lyceum Championships. In total, they have earned one gold medal, one silver medal, and one bronze medal, while competing against the Lyceums of all of Greece.

== Season by season ==
Season	Tier	Division	Pos.	W–L	Greek Cup	European competitions	
2013–14	4	C Basket League	1st	21–3			
2014–15	3	B Basket League	1st	24–2			
2015–16	2	A2 Basket League	3rd	24–14	Round of 16		
2016–17	1	Basket League	9th	10–16	Round of 16		
2017–18	1	Basket League	4th	19–15	Round of 16		
2018–19	1	Basket League	2nd	21–15	Quarterfinalist	2 Champions League	R16
2019–20	1	Basket League	4th	12–7	Runners-up	2 EuroCup	QF
2020–21	1	Basket League	4th	21–13	Runners-up	2 EuroCup	R24
2021–22	1	Basket League	3rd	17–17	Semifinalist	2 EuroCup	R24
2022–23	1	Basket League	5th	13–12		2 EuroCup	QF
2023–24	1	Basket League	4th	18–12	Semifinalist	3 Champions League	QF
2024–25	1	Basket League	4th	13–15	Semifinalist	3 Champions League	R16
2025–26	1	Basket League	10th	8–16	Play-in	3 Champions League	PI

== Titles and honors ==
=== Domestic competitions ===
- Greek League

Runners-up (1): 2018–19

- Greek Cup

Runners-up (2): 2020, 2021

- Greek Super Cup

Winners (1): 2020
Runners-up (2): 2021, 2025

- Greek 3rd Division

Winners (2nd Group) (1): 2014–15

- Greek 4th Division

Winners (3rd Group) (1): 2013–14

=== Friendly competitions ===
- Mavroskoufia Basketball Tournament

Winners (2): 2019 (shared), 2024

== Players ==
=== Current roster ===
Note: Flags indicate national team eligibility at FIBA-sanctioned events. Players may hold other non-FIBA nationalities not displayed.

Promitheas Patras roster
Players
Coaches

Pos.	No.	Nat.	Name	Ht.	Wt.	Age
PG	1	(Greece)	Nikolaidis, Apostolos	1.85 m (6 ft 1 in)		20 – 31 March 2006
F/C	4	(United States)	Coleman, Kendal	2.07 m (6 ft 9 in)	104 kg (229 lb)	24 – 21 August 2002
G/F	8	(Greece)	Kapetakis, Evdoxios	2.00 m (6 ft 7 in)		21 – 9 June 2005
PF	10	(Greece)	Paraskevopoulos, Charilaos	2.01 m (6 ft 7 in)		21 – 3 January 2005
PG	11	(Guinea)	Mouratos, Vassilis	1.94 m (6 ft 4 in)	93 kg (205 lb)	32 – 19 July 1994
PG	12	(Greece)	Diplaros, Nikos	1.90 m (6 ft 3 in)	82 kg (181 lb)	29 – 28 June 1997
G/F	15	(Greece)	Rallis, Ioannis	1.98 m (6 ft 6 in)		19 – 23 October 2007
SF	16	(Greece)	Kalaitzakis, Georgios	2.01 m (6 ft 7 in)	95 kg (209 lb)	27 – 2 January 1999
C	21	(Greece)	Kouroupakis, Periklis	2.06 m (6 ft 9 in)		24 – 12 August 2002
SF	25	(United States)	Arms, Adonis	1.98 m (6 ft 6 in)	93 kg (205 lb)	28 – 26 June 1998
G	26	(United States)	Williams, New	1.83 m (6 ft 0 in)	79 kg (174 lb)	29 – 10 December 1996
F	29	(Greece)	Antetokounmpo, Alex	2.03 m (6 ft 8 in)	97 kg (214 lb)	25 – 27 August 2001
SF	40	(United States)	Cuthbertson, Zac	2.01 m (6 ft 7 in)	84 kg (185 lb)	29 – 27 December 1996
PG	88	(Greece)	Poulos, Dimitris	1.86 m (6 ft 1 in)		18 – 14 May 2008
PF	98	(Lithuania)	Kulboka, Arnoldas	2.08 m (6 ft 10 in)	104 kg (229 lb)	28 – 4 January 1998

Head coach

- (Greece) Georgios Vovoras

Assistant coach(es)

- (Greece) Michalis Michelakos
- (Greece) Vaggelis Spyridis
- (Greece) Giannis Ntagios

Legend

- (C) Team captain
- Injured

- Roster
Updated: 30 September 2026

=== Depth chart ===
Pos.	Starting 5	Bench 1	Bench 2	Bench 3
C	Kendal Coleman	Periklis Kouroupakis
PF	Arnoldas Kulboka	Alex Antetokounmpo	Charilaos Paraskevopoulos
SF	Zac Cuthbertson	Adonis Arms	Evdoxios Kapetakis
SG	New Williams	Marcus Tsochonis		Ioannis Rallis
PG	Nikos Diplaros	Vassilis Mouratos	Apostolos Nikolaidis	Dimitris Poulos

== Notable players ==
Note: Flags indicate national team eligibility at FIBA-sanctioned events. Players may hold other non-FIBA nationalities not displayed.

Criteria

To appear in this section a player must have either:

- Set a club record or won an individual award while at the club
- Played at least one official international match for their national team at any time
- Played at least one official NBA match at any time.

- Dimitris Agravanis
- Giannis Agravanis
- Giannis Athinaiou
- Giorgos Bogris
- Linos Chrysikopoulos
- Nikos Gkikas
- Dimitris Kaklamanakis
- Antonis Karagiannidis
- Leonidas Kaselakis
- Dimitris Katsivelis
- Antonis Koniaris
- Michalis Lountzis
- Vangelis Mantzaris
- Lefteris Mantzoukas
- Loukas Mavrokefalidis
- Vassilis Mouratos
- Nondas Papantoniou
- George Papas
- Nikos Rogkavopoulos
- Christos Saloustros
- Zisis Sarikopoulos
- Georgios Tanoulis
- Michalis Tsairelis
- Antreas Christodoulou
- Fahro Alihodžić
- Simisola Shittu
- Arnoldas Kulboka
- Oleksandr Lypovyy
- Milan Milošević
- Miroslav Todić
- Mihajlo Andrić
- Nemanja Dangubić
- Jaime Echenique
- Gian Clavell
- George Conditt IV
- Delroy James
- Danny Agbelese
- Mouhammad Faye
- Kee Kee Clark
- Chris Babb
- James Bell
- Rion Brown
- Chris Coffey
- Anthony Cowan Jr.
- Octavius Ellis
- Chase Fieler
- Marcus Foster
- Diante Garrett
- Jerai Grant
- Jerian Grant
- Hunter Hale
- Langston Hall
- Bryce Hamilton
- Dustin Hogue
- Dario Hunt
- Wes Iwundu
- Jamal Jones
- Lucky Jones
- Marvin Jones
- J. P. Macura
- Tony Meier
- Ian Miller
- McKenzie Moore
- Toure' Murry
- Zamal Nixon
- Terell Parks
- Pauly Paulicap
- Casey Prather
- Kendrick Ray
- Isaiah Reese
- Cameron Reynolds
- Gerald Robinson
- Deshawn Stephens
- Trevis Simpson
- Joe Thomasson
- Jordan Walker
- Kenny Williams
- KJ Williams
- Joe Young

== Head coaches ==
Head Coach	Years
(Greece) Giannis Kotsonis	2007–2010
(Greece) Nikos Karagiannis	2010–2012
(Greece) Kostas Douvas	2012–2013
(Greece) Christos Milas	2013
(Greece) Makis Giatras	2013–2016
(Greece) Nikos Vetoulas	2016
(Greece) Vangelis Angelou	2016–2017
(Greece) Makis Giatras	2017–2021
(Spain) Luis Casimiro	2021
(Greece) Ilias Zouros	2021–2022
(Greece) Makis Giatras	2022
(Greece) Yannis Christopoulos	2022–2023
(Greece) Ilias Papatheodorou	2023–2025

== Ownership and management ==
Executive	Position
(Greece) Dr. Evangelos Liolios	Owner and Chairman
(Greece) Christos Milas	President and CEO

== Sponsors ==
- Coffee Island
