= Kalaitzakis =

Kalaitzakis is a surname. Notable people with the surname include:

- Georgios Kalaitzakis
- Panagiotis Kalaitzakis
