= Nikos Diplaros =

Greek basketball player (born 1997)

No. 21 – Promitheas Patras
- Position: Point guard / shooting guard
- League: Greek Basketball League

Personal information
- Born: June 28, 1997 (age 29) Patras, Greece
- Listed height: 6 ft 2.75 in (1.90 m)
- Listed weight: 180 lb (82 kg)

Career information
- Playing career: 2015–present

Career history
- 2015–2017: Aris Thessaloniki
- 2016–2017: →Machites Doxas Pefkon
- 2017–2019: Panionios
- 2019: Lovćen
- 2019–2020: Batumi
- 2020–2021: Panathinaikos
- 2021–2022: Apollon Patras
- 2022–2023: Balkan Botevgrad
- 2023–2026: Karditsa
- 2026—present: Promitheas Patras

Career highlights
- Greek League champion (2021); Greek Cup winner (2021); Greek League assists leader (2025); Bulgarian League champion (2023)
Medals
Representing Greece
Men's basketball
FIBA Europe Under-20 Championship
Gold medal – first place	2017 Greece	Under-20
FIBA Europe Under-18 Championship
Gold medal – first place	2015 Greece	Under-18
FIBA Europe Under-20 Championship B
Bronze medal – third place	2016 Greece	Under-20

Nikolaos "Nikos" Diplaros (Greek: Νικόλαος "Νίκος" Δίπλαρος; born June 28, 1997) is a Greek professional basketball player for Promitheas Patras of the Greek Basketball League. He is a 1.90 m (6 ft 2 3/4 in) tall combo guard.

== Professional career ==
Diplaros spent the 2014–15 season with the Greek club Esperos Patras, playing in the amateur level 4th tier division of Greek basketball, the Greek C League. In 2015, he signed a 5-year contract with the Greek 1st Division club AEK. However, he was then released by AEK, before he played any games with them, after he told the press that he wanted to play for an even bigger club than AEK Athens in the future.

A few days after, Aris Thessaloniki approached the player and signed him to a 3-year contract. He then began his professional career with Aris in 2015. In September 2016, Aris loaned him to the Greek 2nd Division club Machites Doxas Pefkon.

He joined the Greek club Panionios in 2017. On September 3, 2018, Diplaros renewed his contract for another season. He subsequently spent the next season and a half between Montenegro (Lovćen) and Georgia (Batumi).

On September 10, 2020, Diplaros signed a two-year (1+1) contract with Panathinaikos as an auxiliary player. In 13 games in the Greek Basket League, he averaged 3 points, 0.5 rebounds and 0.6 assists, playing around 8 minutes per contest. He also appeared in 3 EuroLeague matches with the Greens. Diplaros won both the Greek League and the Greek Cup titles during his short tenure. On July 26, 2021, his contract option was not picked up and he parted ways with the historic club.

Diplaros spent the 2021-22 campaign with Apollon Patras and in 24 league games, he averaged 8.5 points, 2.6 rebounds, 4.7 assists and 1 steal, playing around 27 minutes per contest.

For the 2022–2023 season, Diplaros signed with Bulgarian club Balkan Botevgrad, where he averaged 7.9 points, 4.6 assists and 1.8 steals in the domestic league, as well as 10.8 points, 6 assists and 1.6 steals in the FIBA Europe Cup.

On July 26, 2023, Diplaros returned to Greece, signing with Karditsa.

== National team career ==
Diplaros was a member of the Greek junior national teams. With the junior national teams of Greece, Diplaros played at the 2014 FIBA Under-17 World Cup, the 2015 FIBA Europe Under-18 Championship, where he won a gold medal, and at the 2nd division 2016 FIBA Europe Under-20 Championship Division B, where he won a bronze medal.

He also played at the 2017 FIBA Europe Under-20 Championship, where he won a gold medal.
