= 2020–21 Greek Basketball Cup =

2020–21 Greek Cup
- Season: 2020–21
- Duration: 13 September 2020–9 May 2021
- Teams: 29

Finals
- Champions: Panathinaikos OPAP (20th title)
- Runners-up: Promitheas
- Finals MVP: (Greece) Ioannis Papapetrou

The 2020–21 Greek Basketball Cup was the 46th edition of Greek top-tier level professional domestic basketball cup competition. The previous winner of the cup was AEK. The cup competition started on 13 September 2020 and ended on 9 May 2021. Panathinaikos won the competition.

== Format ==
The top six teams from the top-tier level Greek Basket League's 2019–20 season, gained an automatic bye to the 2020–21 Greek Cup quarterfinals. While the seven lower-placed teams from the 2019–20 Greek Basket League season also gained an automatic bye to the 2020–21 Greek Cup phase two, competing for two quarterfinals spots with phase one winners. All sixteen teams from the second-tier level Greek A2 Basket League's 2019–20 season will start from phase one, competing for one spot in phase two of the cup. All rounds were played under a single elimination format.

== Preliminary rounds ==
=== Phase 1 ===
==== Round 1 ====
Koroivos Amaliadas	66 – 93	Karditsa
Eleftheroupolis	57 – 71	Psychiko
Dafni Dafniou	72 – 96	Olympiacos
Kavala	70 – 75	Amyntas
Triton Athens	54 – 70	Panerythraikos
Oiakas Nafpliou	73 – 57	Apollon Patras
Pagrati	87 – 72	Filippos Verias
Maroussi	92 – 54	Agrinio

==== Round 2 ====
Amyntas	88 – 73	Oiakas Nafpliou
Karditsa	75 – 79	Panerythraikos
Maroussi	87 – 92	Olympiacos
Pagrati	83 – 74	Psychiko

==== Round 3 ====
Amyntas	71 – 61	Panerythraikos
Pagrati	68 – 81	Olympiacos

==== Round 4 ====
Amyntas	79 – 80	Olympiacos

=== Phase 2 ===
==== Round 1 ====
PAOK	20 – 0 (forfeit)	Panionios
Ionikos Nikaias	85 – 73	Aris
Olympiacos	71 – 78	Kolossos Rodou
Larissa	92 – 70	Charilaos Trikoupis

==== Round 2 ====
PAOK	93 – 71	Larissa
Ionikos Nikaias	74 – 86	Kolossos Rodou

== Final rounds ==
Quarterfinals; 10 February 2021; 4 May 2021
Panathinaikos OPAP	88
Peristeri	62
Lavrio	90 (OT)
AEK	85
Iraklis	61
PAOK	63
Kolossos	68
Promitheas	73

Semifinals; 12 February 2021; 6 May 2021
Panathinaikos OPAP	108
Lavrio	71
PAOK	69
Promitheas	76 (OT)

Final; 9 May 2021
Panathinaikos OPAP	91
Promitheas	79

Greek Basketball Cup Final
46th Final
9 May 2021 – O.A.C.A. Olympic Indoor Hall

Panathinaikos OPAP – Promitheas Patras 91–79 (45–41), Quarters: 20–15, 45–41, 68–58, 91–79. Referees: Anastopoulos, Koromilas, Manos

Panathinaikos OPAP (Kattash): Mack, Papagiannis 6, Bochoridis, Papapetrou 25, Hezonja 18, Diplaros, Kaselakis, White 6, Mitoglou 17, Bentil 3, Sant-Roos 16.

Promitheas Patras (Giatras): Agbelese 2, Jerai Grant 18, Clavell 23, Lountzis 9, Agravanis D. 5, Agravanis G. 5, Ford, Christodoulou, Jerian Grant 17, Giannopoulos, Bazinas, Tanoulis.

== Awards ==
=== Finals Most Valuable Player ===
Player	Team
(Greece) Ioannis Papapetrou	Panathinaikos OPAP

=== Finals Top Scorer ===
Player	Team
(Greece) Ioannis Papapetrou	Panathinaikos OPAP
