= Vassilis Mouratos =

Greek basketball player

No. 7 – Iraklis Thessaloniki
- Position: Point guard
- League: Greek Basketball League; FIBA Europe Cup

Personal information
- Born: November 24, 1997 (age 28) Maroussi, Greece
- Listed height: 6 ft 4 in (1.93 m)
- Listed weight: 220 lb (100 kg)

Career information
- Playing career: 2014–present

Career history
- 2014–2017: Olympiacos
- 2016–2017: →Psychiko
- 2017–2018: Faros Larissas
- 2018–2019: Peristeri
- 2019–2022: Lavrio
- 2022–2023: Promitheas Patras
- 2023: Apollon Patras
- 2024–2025: Lavrio
- 2025–2026: Peristeri
- 2026: Iraklis Thessaloniki

Career highlights
- 2× Greek League champion (2015, 2016); All-Greek League First Team (2021); Greek League assists leader (2022); Greek League Most Improved Player (2021)
Medals
Representing Greece
Men's basketball
TBF Under-16 World Cup
Gold medal – first place	2013 Sakarya	Under-16
FIBA Europe Under-16 Championship
Bronze medal – third place	2013 Ukraine	Under-16
FIBA Europe Under-18 Championship
Gold medal – first place	2015 Greece	Under-18
FIBA Europe Under-20 Championship B
Bronze medal – third place	2016 Greece	Under-20
FIBA Europe Under-20 Championship
Gold medal – first place	2017 Greece	Under-20

Vassilis Mouratos (alternate spellings: Vasileios, Vasilis) (Greek: Βασίλης Μουράτος; born November 24, 1997) is a Greek professional basketball player. He is a 1.93 m (6 ft 4 in) tall and 100 kg (220 lb) point guard. His current agent is Konstantinos Oikonomopoulos.

== Professional career ==
After playing with the basketball team of Agioi Anargyroi in the Greek minors, Mouratos began his professional career in 2014, with the Greek League club Olympiacos, after he signed a 5-year contract with the Greek club. He was loaned to the Greek 2nd Division club Psychiko, for the 2016–17 season. Mouratos was released out of his 5-year contract with Olympiacos on June 19, 2017.

He then signed a 2-year contract with the Greek club GSL Faros.

On July 6, 2018, Mouratos signed a three-year deal with Peristeri. On June 30, 2019, Peristeri and Mouratos mutually parted ways.

On August 6, 2019, Mouratos signed a two-year deal with Lavrio. During the very successful 2020–21 season, where the club reached the Greek Basket League finals for the first time, Mouratos averaged 11.5 points, 2.5 rebounds, 5 assists, and 1.1 steals, in 33 games. On July 19, 2021, he officially renewed his contract with Lavrio. In 24 league games as the team's captain, he averaged 11.3 points, 3 rebounds, 6.3 assists and 1 steal, playing around 27 minutes per contest.

On July 1, 2022, Mouratos signed with Promitheas Patras of the Greek Basket League and the EuroCup. In 27 domestic league matches, he averaged 6.2 points, 3.2 rebounds and 2.3 assists in 19 minutes per contest.

On September 12, 2023, Mouratos moved to Apollon Patras. On December 29 of the same year, he made his return to Lavrio. On September 24, 2026, Mouratos moved to Iraklis Thessaloniki.

== National team career ==
=== Greek junior national team ===
Mouratos has been a member of the Greek junior national teams. With the junior national teams of Greece, he played at the 2013 TBF Under-16 World Cup in Sakarya, Turkey, where he helped Greece win the gold medal. He also played at the 2013 FIBA Europe Under-16 Championship, where he helped Greece win a bronze medal.

He also played at the 2014 FIBA Europe Under-18 Championship, the 2014 FIBA Under-17 World Cup, the 2015 FIBA Under-19 World Cup, and the 2nd division 2016 FIBA Europe Under-20 Championship Division B, where he won a bronze medal. He also played at the 2017 FIBA Europe Under-20 Championship, where he won a gold medal.

=== Greek senior national team ===
Mouratos became a member of the senior men's Greek national basketball team in 2017. He played at the 2019 FIBA World Cup qualification.

== Awards and accomplishments ==
=== Pro career ===
- 2× Greek League Champion: (2015), (2016)

=== Greek junior national team ===
- 2013 TBF Under-16 World Cup: Gold
- 2013 FIBA Europe Under-16 Championship: Bronze
- 2015 FIBA Europe Under-18 Championship: Gold
- 2016 FIBA Europe Under-20 Championship Division B: Bronze
- 2017 FIBA Europe Under-20 Championship: Gold
