= New Williams =

American basketball player (born 1996)

No. 26 – Promitheas Patras
- Position: Point guard / Shooting guard
- League: GBL; BCL

Personal information
- Born: December 10, 1996 (age 29) Santa Monica, California, U.S.
- Listed height: 6 ft 1 in (1.85 m)
- Listed weight: 190 lb (86 kg)

Career information
- High school: Santa Monica (Santa Monica, California)
- College: Auburn (2015–2017); Fresno State (2017–2020)
- NBA draft: 2020: undrafted
- Playing career: 2020–present

Career history
- 2021: Rebeldes Del Enriquillo
- 2021–2022: Cupes de Los Pepines
- 2022: Correcaminos de la Parte Baja
- 2022: Leones de Santo Domingo
- 2022: Club San Martín de Corrientes
- 2022: CPN Pueblo Nuevo
- 2022–2023: Cocodrilos de Caracas
- 2023–2024: Apollon Limassol
- 2024: Kazma
- 2024–2026: Konya BBSK
- 2026–present: Promitheas Patras

Nuwr'iyl Elijah "New" Williams (born January 31, 1996) is an American professional basketball player for Promitheas Patras B.C. of the Greek Basketball League and the Basketball Champions League. He is a 1.85 m (6 ft 1 in) tall guard who plays at both the point guard and shooting guard positions.

== Early life and college career ==
Williams was born in Santa Monica, California. He attended Santa Monica High School before beginning his collegiate basketball career at Auburn. After two seasons with the Tigers, he transferred to Fresno State, where he played from 2017 to 2020 and earned All-Mountain West honorable mention recognition during his senior season.

== Professional career ==
After going undrafted in the 2020 NBA draft, Williams played with multiple teams in Argentina, Venezuela, Cyprus, Kuwait, and the Dominican Republic before establishing himself as one of the top guards in the Turkish second division.

=== Konya BBSK (2024–2026) ===
Williams joined Konya BBSK of the Turkish TBL in 2024. During the 2025–26 season, he averaged 20.6 points, 3.8 rebounds and 4.5 assists per game.

=== Promitheas Patras (2026–present) ===
On June 17, 2026, Williams signed with Promitheas Patras of the Greek Basketball League.
