= Pauly Paulicap =

American basketball player (born 1997)

No. 22 – Bàsquet Manresa
- Position: Power forward
- League: Liga ACB

Personal information
- Born: May 7, 1997 (age 29) Elmont, New York, U.S.
- Listed height: 6 ft 8 in (2.03 m)
- Listed weight: 220 lb (100 kg)

Career information
- High school: Elmont Memorial (Elmont, New York)
- College: Harcum College (2015–2017); Manhattan (2017–2020); DePaul (2020–2021); West Virginia (2021–2022)
- NBA draft: 2022: undrafted
- Playing career: 2022–present

Career history
- 2022–2023: Anorthosis Famagusta
- 2023–2025: Treviso
- 2025: Changwon LG Sakers
- 2025–2026: Promitheas Patras
- 2026–present: Manresa

Career highlights
- MAAC Defensive Player of the Year (2018)

Pauly Paulicap (born May 9, 1997) is an American professional basketball player for Bàsquet Manresa of the Spanish Liga ACB. He played college basketball for Harcum College, Manhattan College, DePaul University, and West Virginia University.

== Early life and high school ==
Paulicap grew up homeless at times. He would walk around carrying a duffle bag and barely had any clothes. Growing up in Elmont, New York he didn't play sports and was frequently in trouble at Elmont Memorial High School. When his mother, Marie, and his stepfather separated, the family struggled to pay rent and was forced to move multiple times. A landlord evicted him from his brother's apartment when he learned Paulicap was staying there without paying. A friend's uncle demanded Paulicap leave their house believing him to be a bad influence. The school suggested the Nassau Haven group home, which provides housing for runaway and homeless youth. The family of one of Paulicap's closest childhood friends opened their home to him. His junior year of high school, Paulicap picked up a basketball for the first time in his life. As a senior in high school, he was an All-County selection. In high school, Paulicap also threw the discus for the track team. As a senior, he also began playing volleyball.

== College career ==
=== Harcum College (2015–2017) ===
After high school, Paulicap joined Harcum College where he was sixth in the nation in blocked shots.

=== Manhattan College (2017–2020) ===
In May 2017, Steve Masiello announced the addition of Paulicap for the 2017–2018 season where he would have three years eligibility.

On December 19, 2017, Paulicap received a Manhattan College ATAX Student-Athlete of the Week award alongside Courtney Warley after scoring 16 points with a career and game-high rebounds at University of Tulsa. On January 30, 2020, he was named an ATAX Student-Athlete of the Week alongside women's basketball player Emily LaPointe. He averaged 12.5 points, 8.5 rebounds and 3 blocks per game. On February 13, 2020, he was named an ATAX Student-Athlete of the Week alongside Ashley Gambardella who was a freshman goalie on the women's lacrosse team. He averaged 17.5 points, 8 rebounds and 1.5 blocks per game. He was also featured as the number six play on SportsCenter Top 10 with a block at Quinnipiac University.

On March 2, 2018, Paulicap was named MAAC Defensive Player of the Year. He averaged 2.6 blocks per game while ranking fourth in the circuit with 6.7 rebounds per game.

On October 23, 2018, Paulicap was named to the Preseason All-MAAC Second Team. He was ranked 16 nationally with a MAAC best 2.6 blocks per game to go along with 10 points and 6.9 rebounds.

On October 22, 2019, he was named to the Preseason All-MAAC Third Team. He averaged 8.5 points per game in limited action.

On March 9, 2020, he earned All-MAAC Third Team honors. He ranked among the MAAC leaders in scoring, rebounding, and blocks. He became the 13 student-athlete under Steve Masiello to be named to an All-MAAC team.

On March 26, 2020, Paulicap was named to the 2020 MAAC All-Championship team alongside Jesse Boyce and Tyler Reynolds.

=== DePaul University (2020–2021) ===
On July 17, 2020, Paulicap joined DePaul University as a graduate transfer. He finished his undergraduate career at Manhattan College after averaging 10.4 points, 6.6 rebounds, and 1.9 blocks per game. He joined a newcomer class that included Javon Freeman-Liberty.

=== West Virginia University (2021–2022) ===
In April 2021, Paulicap signed a grant-in aid to attend and play basketball for West Virginia University under Coach Bob Huggins. He would be a graduate transfer and have one year of eligibility remaining. He joined Malik Curry as a transfer.

== Professional career ==
=== Anorthosis Famagusta (2022–2023) ===
After going undrafted, Paulicap started his professional career in the Cyprus Basketball Division A and averaged 14.4 points and 12.2 rebounds.

=== Nutribullet Treviso Basket (2023–2025) ===
On June 2, 2024, Paulicap signed with Universo Treviso Basket after arriving with the team in the summer of 2023 and signed a two-year contract. He had finished the previous season as the fourth-best rebounder in the league and the best shot blocker in Lega Basket Serie A. On January 3, 2024, Paulicap was named Defensive Player of the Month and had 9.4 rebounds and 1.8 blocks in five straight wins in five games.

=== Changwon LG Sakers (2025) ===
In May 2025, Paulicap signed with the Changwon LG Sakers of the Korean Basketball League for the 2025 Basketball Champions League Asia.

=== ASP Promitheas Patras (2025–2026) ===
On July 6, 2025, Paulicap signed with Promitheas of the Greek Basketball League.

=== Bàsquet Manresa (2026–present) ===
On January 13, 2026, Paulicap signed with Bàsquet Manresa of the Liga ACB and EuroCup.

== Personal life ==
In his free time, he runs an Instagram page where he features some of his best culinary creations. He used to watch House Kitchen and was always intrigued with the idea of food and putting different things together. In 2022, Paulicap started a small business making home-cooked meals and would post the menus to his Instagram story.

Paulicap is the youngest of four brothers and three sisters.
