= Apostolos Nikolaidis =

Apostolos Nikolaidis may refer to:

- Apostolos Nikolaidis (athlete), Greek athlete and Panathinaikos ex president
  - Apostolos Nikolaidis Stadium, a stadium named for the above athlete located in Athens, Greece
- Apostolos Nikolaidis (singer), Greek singer
