= Coffee Island =

Greek coffee house chain

- Type: Franchise
- Industry: Food and Beverage
- Genre: Coffee house
- Founded: 1999
- Headquarters: Patras, Greece
- Number of locations: 491 (2024)
- Area served: Greece, Cyprus, United Kingdom, Canada, Romania, Switzerland, Egypt, Spain, India, Iraq, France, Jordan
- Key people: Konstantinos Konstantinopoulos (CEO)
- Products: Coffee, Tea
- Website: https://www.coffeeisland.com

Coffee Island is one of the largest European coffeehouse companies headquartered in Greece. The chain offers over 62 different varieties of coffee.

== History ==
The company was founded in 1999, in Patras by a doctor. The business is a franchise specialising in coffee, in-house food and coffee making equipment.

In 2009, Coffee Island expanded and introduced its first coffee shop in Cyprus.

In 2014 the chief executive officer of the company was Konstantinos Konstantinopoulos and the chain had 135 outlets in Greece and 27 in Cyprus.

By 2015 the company had expanded further with 256 stores that employed around 1,300 people in Greece alone.

In November 2016, Coffee Island expanded to the United Kingdom opening its first store in Covent Garden, London in the United Kingdom while in May 2017 another store opened in Toronto, Canada.

== Stores ==
As of December 2019 the chain consists of 432 coffee shops, mostly in Greece, but also in Cyprus, UK, Dubai, and Canada, while it has established its own coffee production and processing units. As of 2018 2017 the company was ranked as the sixth largest coffee chain network in Europe.

== Locations ==
As of September 2025 there were 451 stores in the following 11 countries

| Country | Number of stores |
|---|---|
| Greece | 395 |
| Cyprus | 40 |
| Egypt | 9 |
| United Kingdom | 2 |
| Canada | 2 |
| Romania | 1 |
| India | 9 |
| Spain | 2 |
| Switzerland | 1 |
| Iraq | 1 |
| France | 1 |
| Jordan | 1 |

== See also ==
- List of coffee companies
- List of coffeehouse chains
