= Jerian Grant =

American basketball player (born 1992)

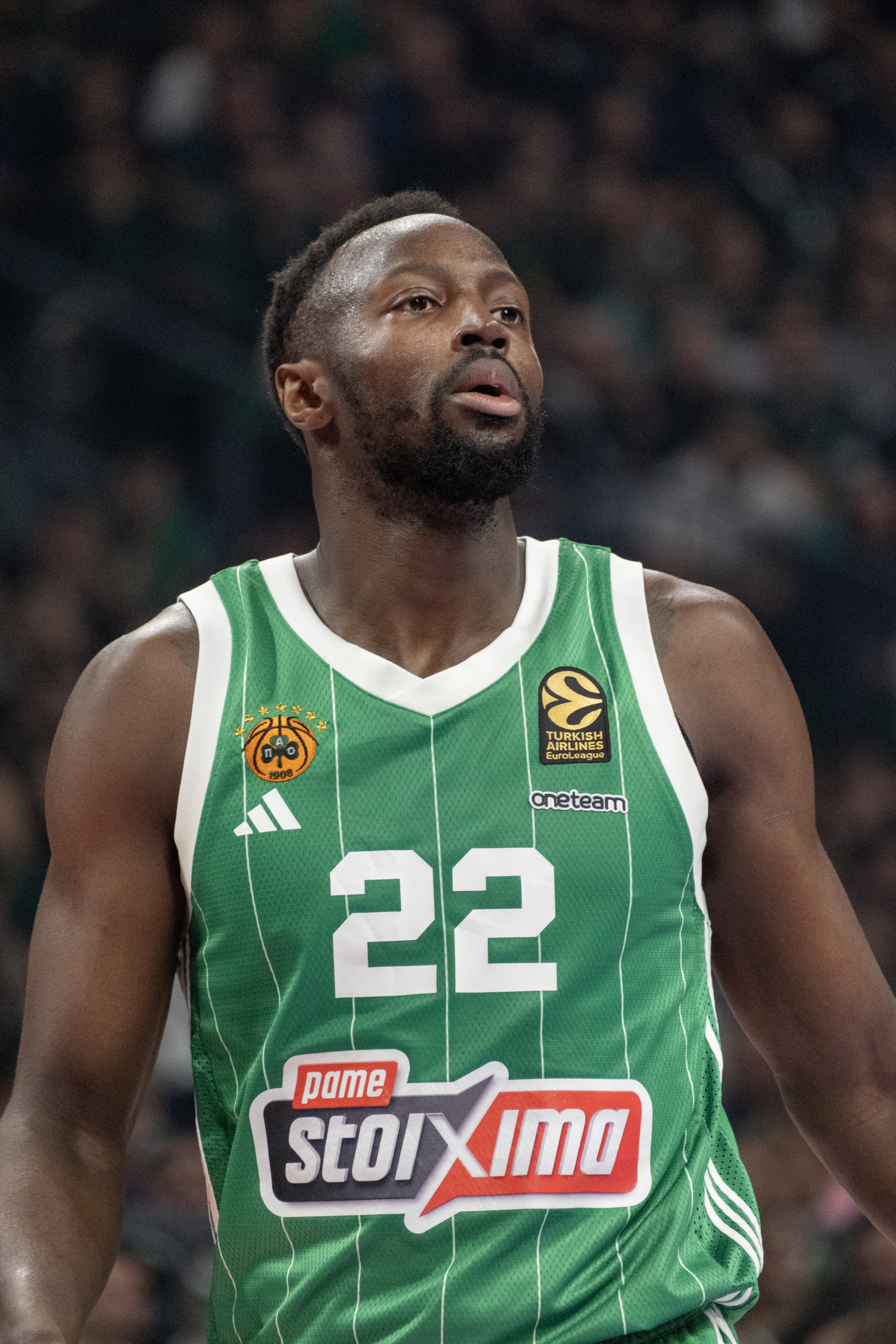
- Grant with Panathinaikos in 2025

No. 22 – Panathinaikos
- Position: Point guard / shooting guard
- League: Greek Basketball League; EuroLeague

Personal information
- Born: October 9, 1992 (age 34) Silver Spring, Maryland, U.S.
- Listed height: 1.96 m (6 ft 5 in)
- Listed weight: 205 lb (93 kg)

Career information
- High school: DeMatha (Hyattsville, Maryland)
- College: Notre Dame (2011–2015)
- NBA draft: 2015: 1st round, 19th overall pick
- Drafted by: Washington Wizards
- Playing career: 2015–present

Career history
- 2015–2016: New York Knicks
- 2016–2018: Chicago Bulls
- 2016: →Windy City Bulls
- 2018–2019: Orlando Magic
- 2019–2020: Capital City Go-Go
- 2020: Washington Wizards
- 2020–2021: Promitheas Patras
- 2021–2022: Olimpia Milano
- 2022–2023: Türk Telekom
- 2023–present: Panathinaikos

Career highlights
- EuroLeague champion (2024); EuroCup MVP (2023); All-EuroCup First Team (2023); Greek League champion (2024); 2× Greek Cup winner (2025, 2026); Lega Serie A champion (2022); Italian Cup winner (2022); All-Turkish Super League First Team (2023); 2× Greek League Defensive Player of the Year (2024, 2025); Consensus first-team All-American (2015); First-team All-ACC (2015); Second-team All-Big East (2013); ACC tournament MVP (2015)
- Stats at NBA.com
- Stats at Basketball Reference
Medals
Men's basketball
Representing the United States
FIBA AmeriCup
Bronze medal – third place	2025 Managua

Holdyn Jerian Grant (born October 9, 1992) is an American professional basketball player for Panathinaikos of the Greek Basketball League (GBL) and the EuroLeague. He played college basketball with the University of Notre Dame and was considered one of the top college players in the nation for the 2014–15 season. After being selected with the 19th overall pick by the Washington Wizards in the 2015 NBA draft, his rights were sent to the Atlanta Hawks and then moved to the New York Knicks on draft night. Grant is widely considered as one of the best defenders in the EuroLeague.

== College career ==
After a high school career at prep power DeMatha Catholic High School, Grant came to Notre Dame to play for coach Mike Brey. After redshirting his freshman season, Grant was named to the Big East Conference All-Rookie team after averaging 12.3 points and 4.97 assists per game. In his second season with the Irish, Grant was named second-team All-Big East after averaging 13.3 points and 5.5 assists per game.

After the 2012–13 season, Notre Dame moved from the Big East to the Atlantic Coast Conference (ACC). Based on his strong sophomore campaign, Grant was voted onto the preseason All-ACC team. Grant had a strong start to the season, leading the Fighting Irish at 19.01 points per game during their 8–4 start. But on December 23, 2013, Grant was ruled academically ineligible for the rest of the season and forced to withdraw from Notre Dame. Grant chose to return to Notre Dame rather than declare his eligibility for the 2014 NBA draft.

Grant returned to Notre Dame for the 2014–15 season. Grant immediately helped the Fighting Irish to a 20–3 start and Grant personally had a breakout season as the leader of the team's highly efficient offense. He was named to the midseason watch lists for the John R. Wooden Award and the Oscar Robertson Trophy. The Grant-led Irish finished the year with a 32–6 record and an ACC Tournament championship; they advanced to the Elite 8 in the Midwest Region, where they lost to an undefeated Kentucky team by 2 points.

== Professional career ==
=== New York Knicks (2015–2016) ===
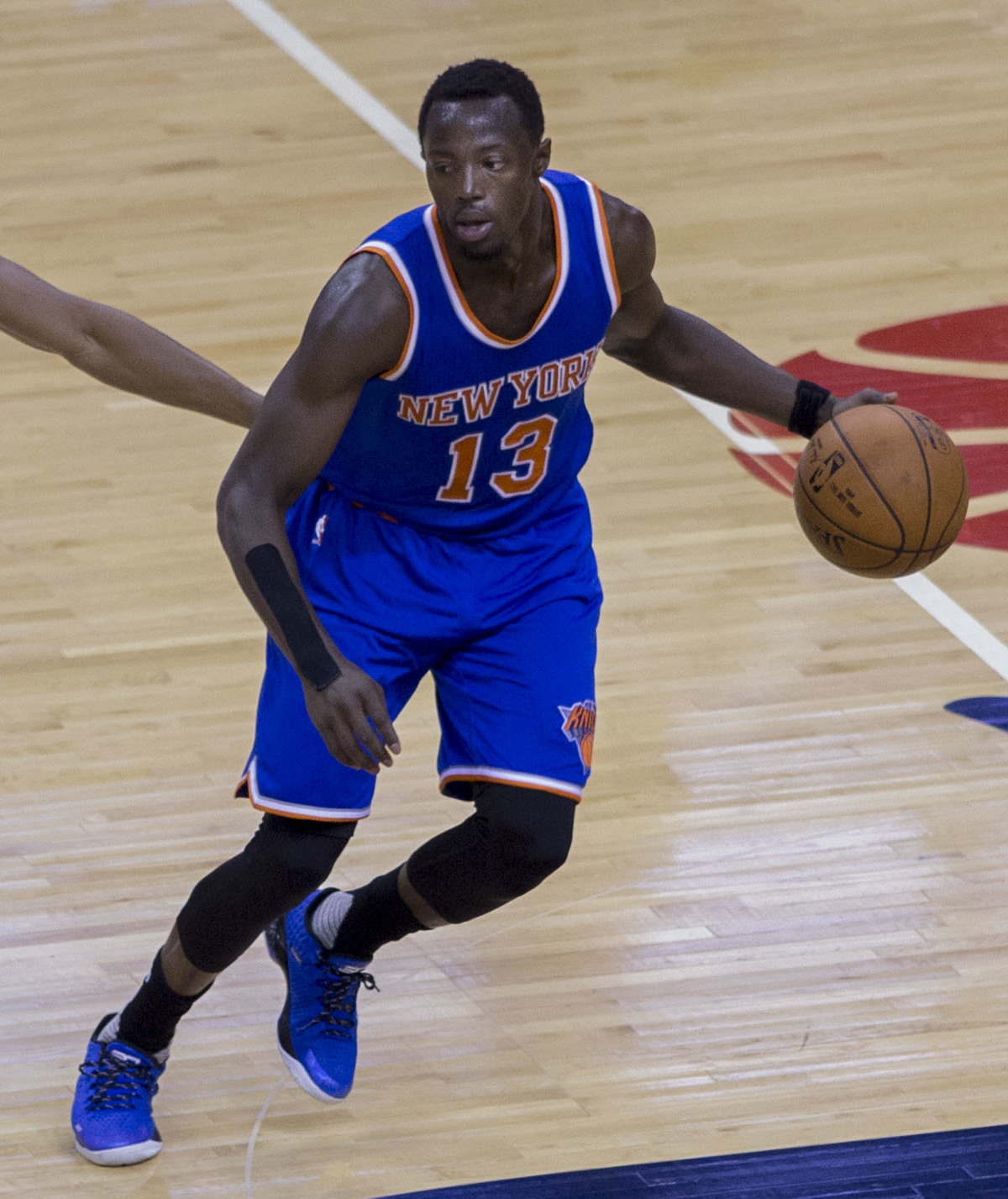
Grant dribbles the ball in 2015

Grant was selected the 19th overall pick by the Washington Wizards in the 2015 NBA draft. His rights were subsequently traded to the Atlanta Hawks before finally being traded to the New York Knicks in exchange for Tim Hardaway Jr. He later joined the Knicks for the 2015 NBA Summer League where he averaged 11.8 points, 3.2 rebounds and 4.8 assists in five games. On July 30, 2015, he signed his rookie scale contract with the Knicks. On December 2, he tied his season-high of 12 points in a win over his brother Jerami and the Philadelphia 76ers. On January 12, 2016, he had a season-best game with 16 points and 8 assists in a 120–114 win over the Boston Celtics.

=== Chicago Bulls (2016–2018) ===
On June 22, 2016, Grant was traded, along with José Calderón and Robin Lopez, to the Chicago Bulls in exchange for Derrick Rose, future teammate Justin Holiday and a 2017 second-round draft pick. The following month, he helped the Bulls win the Las Vegas Summer League championship game and earned MVP honors for his 24 points, 10 rebounds, and five assists. On November 15, 2016, he made his first start of the season and had 18 points and five steals in a 113–88 win over the Portland Trail Blazers. On November 26, he was assigned to the Windy City Bulls, Chicago's D-League affiliate. He was recalled on November 27, reassigned on December 9, and recalled again on December 10. On April 10, 2017, he had 17 points and a career-high 11 assists in a 122–75 win over the Orlando Magic.

On November 26, 2017, Grant scored a career-high 24 points in a 100–93 loss to the Miami Heat. On December 29, 2017, he had 11 points, 12 assists and seven rebounds as a starter in a 119–107 win over the Indiana Pacers. On January 22, 2018, he had 22 points and 13 assists in a 132–128 double overtime loss to the New Orleans Pelicans.

=== Orlando Magic (2018–2019) ===
On July 7, 2018, Grant was traded to the Orlando Magic in a three-team deal. On June 30, 2019, Grant did not receive a qualifying offer from the Magic, making him an unrestricted free agent.

=== Capital City Go-Go (2019–2020) ===
On November 18, 2019, Capital City Go-Go announced that they had added Grant off of waivers. On January 15, 2020, Grant scored 28 points and added seven rebounds, seven assists and one block in a win over Raptors 905. Grant averaged 16.3 points and 5.9 assists per game.

=== Washington Wizards (2020) ===
On July 1, 2020, Grant was signed by the Washington Wizards.

On December 1, 2020, Grant was signed by the Houston Rockets. He was waived on December 16.

=== Promitheas Patras (2020–2021) ===
On December 31, 2020, Greek club Promitheas Patras announced that they had signed Grant. There, he would be joining his older brother, Jerai. In 27 games in the Greek Basket League, Grant averaged 14.8 points, 4.2 rebounds and 6.7 assists.

=== Olimpia Milano (2021–2022) ===
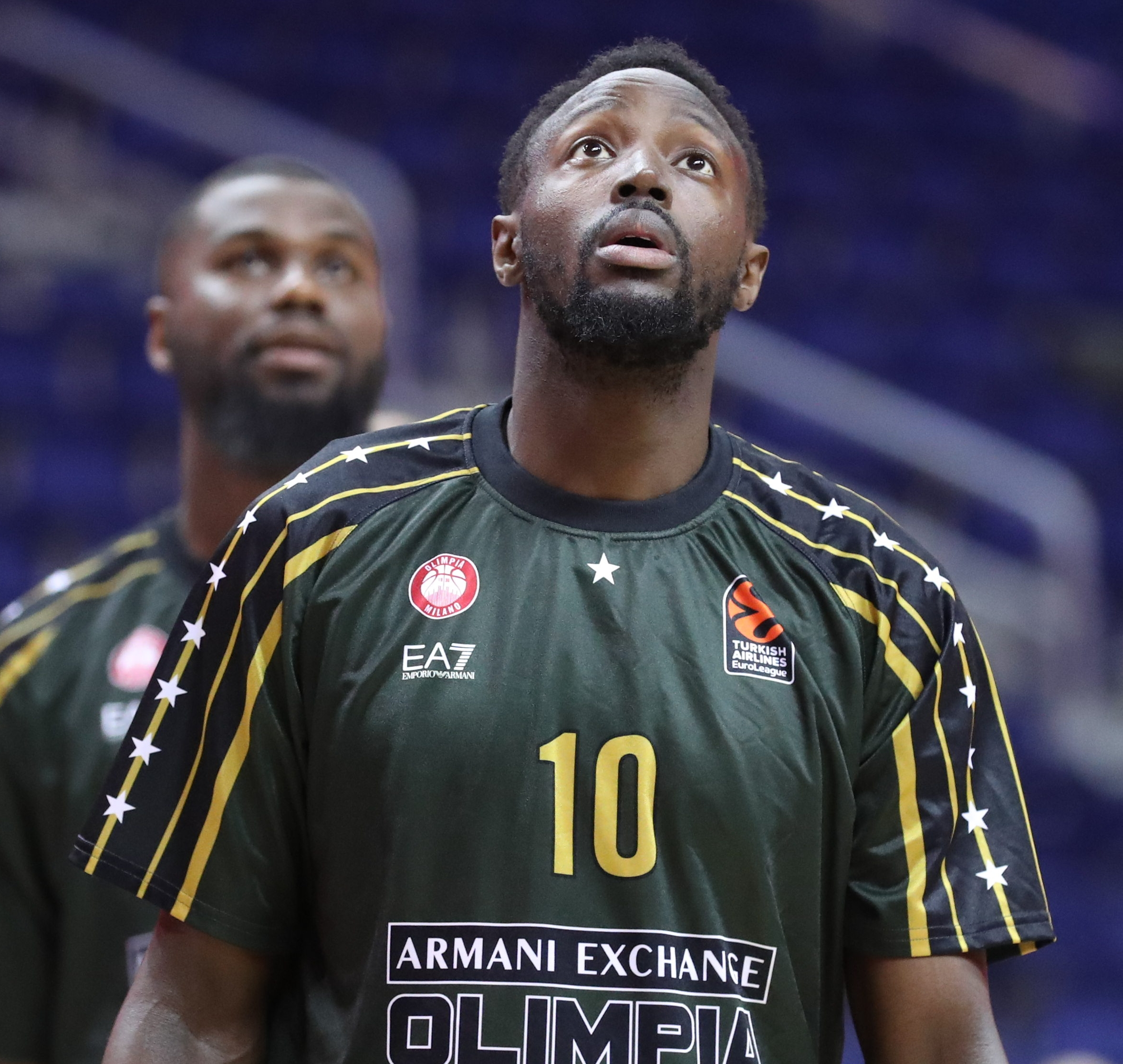
Grant warms up before a game in 2021

On July 1, 2021, Grant officially signed a two-year deal with Olimpia Milano of the Lega Basket Serie A and the EuroLeague, under coach Ettore Messina. On July 2, 2022, he parted ways with the Italian club, having won both domestic titles during his stint.

=== Türk Telekom (2022–2023) ===
On July 14, 2022, Grant signed with Türk Telekom of the Basketbol Süper Ligi (BSL). In the domestic league, he averaged 16.4 points, 3.6 rebounds and 5.7 assists per game, leading the club to the 1st place in the regular season standings.

Additionally, in 22 EuroCup matches, he averaged 14.9 points, 3.2 rebounds, 6.1 assists and 1.3 steals in 33 minutes per contest, and reached the final with his team, where they were defeated by CB Gran Canaria. For these efforts, Grant was named Most Valuable Player of the 2022–2023 EuroCup season.

=== Panathinaikos (2023–present) ===
On July 10, 2023, Grant signed a one-year contract with Greek powerhouse Panathinaikos B.C..

On July 10, 2024, Grant renewed his contract for an additional two seasons, keeping him with the club until the end of the 2025–26 season.

On June 14, 2025, Grant signed a further contract extension with improved terms through 2028, solidifying his role as a key contributor to the team's success.

During his time at Panathinaikos, Grant has been instrumental in the team's achievements, including winning the EuroLeague title in the 2023–24 season. In the championship game against Real Madrid, he delivered an all-around performance, contributing 11 points, six rebounds, five assists, two steals, and a performance index rating (PIR) of 17.

Grant's consistent performance and leadership on both ends of the court have made him a fan favorite at OAKA Basketball Arena, with his contract extensions reflecting the club's confidence in his contributions and future with the team.

== Career statistics ==
Legend
GP	Games played	GS	Games started	MPG	Minutes per game
FG%	Field-goal percentage	3P%	3-point field-goal percentage	FT%	Free-throw percentage
RPG	Rebounds per game	APG	Assists per game	SPG	Steals per game
BPG	Blocks per game	PPG	Points per game	PIR	Performance index rating
**Bold**	Career high

=== NBA ===
==== Regular season ====
Year	Team	GP	GS	MPG	FG%	3P%	FT%	RPG	APG	SPG	BPG	PPG
2015–16	New York	**76**	6	16.6	.394	.220	.780	1.9	2.3	.7	.1	5.6
2016–17	Chicago	63	**28**	16.3	**.425**	**.366**	**.890**	1.8	1.9	.7	.1	5.9
2017–18	Chicago	74	26	**22.8**	.415	.324	.745	**2.3**	**4.6**	**.9**	.1	**8.4**
2018–19	Orlando	60	1	15.7	.418	.364	.650	1.6	2.6	.7	.1	4.2
2019–20	Washington	6	0	13.3	.370	.250	.714	1.0	1.5	.2	**.2**	4.2
Career		279	61	17.9	.411	.323	.770	1.9	2.9	.7	.1	6.1

==== Playoffs ====
Year	Team	GP	GS	MPG	FG%	3P%	FT%	RPG	APG	SPG	BPG	PPG
2017	Chicago	**5**	**2**	**10.4**	**.261**	**.111**	**1.000**	.8	**1.0**	**.4**	—	**3.2**
2019	Orlando	3	0	4.7	.200	.000	**1.000**	**1.3**	**1.0**	—	—	1.7
Career		8	2	8.3	.242	.063	1.000	1.0	1.0	.3	—	2.6

=== EuroLeague ===
†	Denotes season in which Grant won the EuroLeague
*	Led the league

Year	Team	GP	GS	MPG	FG%	3P%	FT%	RPG	APG	SPG	BPG	PPG	PIR
2021–22	Olimpia Milano	26	3	12.4	.316	.243	**.889**	.7	.7	.3	**.1**	2.8	1.6
2023–24†	Panathinaikos	**41***	**34**	**27.6**	.461	.416	.861	**2.3**	**3.5**	**1.5**	**.1**	**8.6**	**10.9**
2024–25	Panathinaikos	41	32	26.8	**.493**	**.429**	.847	2.1	3.2	0.9	**.1**	**8.6**	10.6
Career		108	69	23.4	.433	.398	.858	1.5	2.7	1.0	.1	7.2	8.6

=== EuroCup ===
Year	Team	GP	GS	MPG	FG%	3P%	FT%	RPG	APG	SPG	BPG	PPG	PIR
2022–23	Türk Telekom	22	22	33.5	.452	.297	.818	3.2	6.1	1.3	—	14.9	18.7
Career		22	22	33.5	.452	.297	.818	3.2	6.1	1.3	—	14.9	18.7

=== Domestic leagues ===
Year	Team	League	GP	MPG	FG%	3P%	FT%	RPG	APG	SPG	BPG	PPG
2016–17	(United States) Windy City Bulls	D-League	2	**41.6**	.452	.273	.813	**4.0**	**8.0**	**2.5**	**.5**	**27.0**
2019–20	(United States) Capital City Go-Go	G League	39	33.3	.475	.441	.835	4.4	5.5	1.4	.3	16.3
2020–21	(Greece) Promitheas Patras	GBL	27	34.5	.489	.385	.787	4.2	6.7	2.2	.3	14.8
2021–22	(Italy) Olimpia Milano	LBA	36	21.5	.426	.402	.797	1.9	2.7	.9	.2	7.4
2022–23	(Turkey) Türk Telekom	TBSL	**37**	32.4	.513	.419	.803	3.6	5.7	1.2	.1	16.3
2023–24	(Greece) Panathinaikos	GBL	32	24.1	**.536**	.458	**.908**	2.2	4.0	1.1	.2	9.2
2024–25	(Greece) Panathinaikos	GBL	26	23.2	.521	**.467**	.820	2.0	3.8	.7	.0	7.9

=== College ===
Year	Team	GP	GS	MPG	FG%	3P%	FT%	RPG	APG	SPG	BPG	PPG
2011–12	Notre Dame	34	33	36.2	.380	.354	.819	2.9	5.0	1.3	.2	12.3
2012–13	Notre Dame	35	34	36.3	.406	.344	.737	2.9	5.5	1.3	.2	13.3
2013–14	Notre Dame	12	12	35.6	**.518**	**.408**	**.865**	2.5	6.2	**2.0**	.3	**19.0**
2014–15	Notre Dame	**38**	**38**	**37.1**	.478	.316	.780	**3.0**	**6.7**	1.7	**.5**	16.5
Career		119	117	36.4	.436	.345	.790	2.9	5.8	1.5	.3	14.6

== Personal life ==
Jerian Grant is the son of former National Basketball Association (NBA) player Harvey Grant. He has three brothers, two of whom play basketball professionally – his older brother Jerai has played in several leagues around the world and his younger brother Jerami plays for the Memphis Grizzlies. His youngest brother Jaelin also played basketball at DeMatha. His uncle and father's identical twin Horace Grant was an NBA All-Star and won four championships with the Chicago Bulls and Los Angeles Lakers. Grant also has two sons, Hunter Jrue and Harper Jrex Grant and a daughter, Haidyn Jream Grant.
