= 2020–21 Greek Basket League =

81st season of the Greek Basket League

Greek Basket League
- Season: 2020–21
- Dates: October 24 2020 – June 2021
- Teams: 12

Regular season
- Season MVP: (Greece) Ioannis Papapetrou

Finals
- Champions: Panathinaikos (39th title)
- Runners-up: Lavrio
- Third place: AEK
- Finals MVP: (Greece) Ioannis Papapetrou

Statistical leaders
Points	(Turkey) Kerem Kanter	382
Rebounds	(Turkey) Kerem Kanter	162
Assists	(Greece) Vasilis Xanthopoulos	138
Index Rating	(Turkey) Kerem Kanter	402

The 2020–21 Basket League season was the 29th season of the top-tier Greek professional basketball league, since its establishment in 1992, and the 81st season of top-flight Greek basketball overall.

== Teams ==
=== Promotion and relegation ===
Relegated from the Greek Basket League 2019–20 season

Ifaistos Lemnos, Rethymno Cretan Kings and Panionios decided not to participate in the Greek Basket League in the 2020–21 season, due to financial problems.

Promoted from the Greek A2 Basket League 2019–20 season

Messolonghi won the A2 League championship, and was thus promoted to the first tier level, for the first time in its history. Diagoras Dryopideon entered in the first league and absorbed by Ionikos Nikaias on 9 July 2020.

=== Locations and arenas ===
Location of clubs for the 2020–21 Greek Basket League season.

Club	Location	Arena	Capacity	App.
AEK	Athens (Marousi)	OAKA Indoor Hall	19,443	71
Aris	Thessaloniki	Alexandrio Melathron	5,138	67
Messolonghi	Agrinio	Agrinio Indoor Hall	1,500	1
Ionikos	Piraeus (Nikaia)	Platon Indoor Hall	1,200	14
Iraklis	Thessaloniki	Ivanofeio Sports Arena	2,500	53
Kolossos	Rhodes	Kallithea Palais des Sports	1,400	15
Larisa	Larissa	Neapolis Indoor Arena	4,000	2
Lavrio	Lavrio	Lavrio Indoor Hall	1,700	6
Panathinaikos	Athens (Marousi)	OAKA Indoor Hall	19,443	71
PAOK	Thessaloniki (Pylaia)	PAOK Sports Arena	8,162	64
Peristeri	Athens (Peristeri)	Peristeri Arena	4,000	25
Promitheas	Patras	Dimitris Tofalos Arena	4,200	5

== Regular season ==
=== League table ===
Pos	Team	Pld	W	L	PF	PA	PD	Pts	Qualification or relegation
1	Panathinaikos OPAP	22	20	2	1949	1578	+371	42	Advanced to playoffs
2	Lavrio Megabolt	22	17	5	1810	1722	+88	39	Advanced to playoffs
3	Promitheas Patras	22	16	6	1768	1677	+91	38	Advanced to playoffs
4	AEK Athens	22	14	8	1813	1666	+147	36	Advanced to playoffs
5	PAOK	22	13	9	1736	1729	+7	35	Advanced to playoffs
6	Peristeri	22	11	11	1615	1634	−19	33	Advanced to playoffs
7	Kolossos H Hotels	22	8	14	1720	1703	+17	30	Advanced to playoffs
8	Ionikos Hellenic Coin	22	8	14	1699	1789	−90	30	Advanced to playoffs
9	Aris Thessaloniki	22	7	15	1622	1704	−82	29	
10	Iraklis	22	7	15	1617	1769	−152	29	
11	Larisa Bread factory	22	6	16	1633	1785	−152	28	
12	Messolonghi BAXI	22	5	17	1594	1820	−226	27	Relegated to Greek A2 Basket League

Updated to match(es) played on 10 April 2021. Source: ESAKE

=== Results ===
Home \ Away	AEK	ARIS	ION	IRA	KOL	LAR	LAV	MES	PAN	PAOK	PER	PRO
AEK	—	84–67	81–74	100–97	89–72	87–68	94–97	98–76	95–104	76–56	91–59	75–82
Aris	68–73	—	74–62	81–75	74–84	70–52	89–94	77–48	75–93	71–77	71–84	94–83
Ionikos	68–81	68–64	—	67–77	86–85	83–76	88–89	100–85	53–79	83–84	75–80	86–77
Iraklis	72–79	54–76	75–78	—	66–65	73–69	60–77	100–78	66–100	75–57	71–75	85–90
Kolossos	79–72	83–72	94–74	84–61	—	90–64	77–62	66–77	82–95	84–85	80–65	79–84
Larisa	76–75	84–88	76–97	80–76	82–73	—	58–66	84–58	89–98	88–91	78–98	85–81
Lavrio	78–70	92–71	81–91	105–77	83–77	81–75	—	87–70	92–82	84–77	88–71	75–72
Messolonghi	66–87	73–70	79–66	68–71	87–77	79–77	75–79	—	66–73	69–84	63–70	82–88
Panathinaikos	80–75	94–72	98–74	106–74	90–67	69–60	105–69	102–68	—	96–67	76–57	78–80
PAOK	85–87	75–64	86–84	79–72	82–74	91–93	83–65	96–87	68–74	—	85–66	81–78
Peristeri	62–66	82–65	86–70	70–79	84–81	82–78	70–78	84–72	68–74	76–67	—	70–73
Promitheas	80–78	90–69	82–72	85–61	69–67	81–63	90–88	84–68	61–83	83–80	75–58	—

Updated to match(es) played on January 31, 2021. Source: esake.gr
Legend: Blue = home team win; Red = away team win.
Matches with lighter background shading were decided after overtime.

== Playoffs ==
The eight highest ranked teams in the regular season qualified for the playoffs. Quarterfinals will be played in a Best of 3 format while the rest of the series will be played in a Best of 5 format.

=== Bracket ===
Quarter-finals
Panathinaikos	2
Ionikos	0
AEK	2
PAOK	1
Lavrio	2
Kolossos	0
Promitheas	2
Peristeri	1

Semi-finals
Panathinaikos	3
AEK	1
Lavrio	3
Promitheas	2

Final
Panathinaikos	3
Lavrio	1
Third place
Promitheas	1
AEK	3

=== Quarterfinals ===
Team 1	Series	Team 2	Game 1	Game 2	Game 3
Panathinaikos	2–0	Ionikos	102–64	90–61	
AEK	2–1	PAOK	102–89	73–81	87–81
Lavrio	2–0	Kolossos	87–68	88–84	
Promitheas	2–1	Peristeri	66–83	90–79	86–58

=== Semifinals ===
Team 1	Series	Team 2	Game 1	Game 2	Game 3	Game 4	Game 5
Panathinaikos	3–1	AEK	78–72	80–92	94-83	78-71	
Lavrio	3–2	Promitheas	79–86	66-68	85-79 (OT)	92-77	81-74

==== Third-place series ====
Team 1	Series	Team 2	Game 1	Game 2	Game 3	Game 4	Game 5
Promitheas	1–3	AEK	77-73	101-113	80-81	72-95	

=== Finals ===
Team 1	Series	Team 2	Game 1	Game 2	Game 3	Game 4	Game 5
Panathinaikos	3–1	Lavrio	100-72	89-94 (OT)	103-74	82-66	

== Final standings ==
Pos	Team	Pld	W	L	Qualification or Relegation
1	Panathinaikos	32	28	4	Qualification to the EuroLeague
2	Lavrio	33	23	10	Qualification to the Basketball Champions League
3	AEK	33	20	13	Qualification to the Basketball Champions League
4	Promitheas	34	21	13	Qualification to the EuroCup
5	PAOK	25	14	11	Qualification to the Basketball Champions League
6	Peristeri	25	12	13	Qualification to the Basketball Champions League
7	Kolossos	24	8	16	
8	Ionikos	24	8	16	Qualification to the FIBA Europe Cup
9	Aris	22	7	15	
10	Iraklis	22	7	15	Qualification to the FIBA Europe Cup
11	Larisa	22	6	16	
12	Messolonghi	22	5	17	Relegation to the Greek A2 League

== Awards ==
All official awards of the 2020–21 Greek Basket League.

=== Greek League MVP ===
Player	Team
(Greece) Ioannis Papapetrou	Panathinaikos

=== Greek League Finals MVP ===
Player	Team
(Greece) Ioannis Papapetrou	Panathinaikos

=== All-Greek League Team ===
Pos.	Player	Team
G	(Greece) Vassilis Mouratos	Lavrio
G	(United States) Tyson Carter	Lavrio
F	(Greece) Ioannis Papapetrou	Panathinaikos
F	(Greece) Dinos Mitoglou	Panathinaikos
C	(Greece) Giorgos Papagiannis	Panathinaikos

=== Best Coach ===
Player	Team
(Greece) Christos Serelis	Lavrio

=== Defensive Player of the Year ===
Player	Team
(Cuba) Howard Sant-Roos	Panathinaikos

=== Best Young Player ===
Player	Team
(Greece) Nikos Chougkaz	Ionikos

=== Most Improved Player ===
Player	Team
(Greece) Vassilis Mouratos	Lavrio

=== Most Popular Player ===
Player	Team
(Croatia) Mario Hezonja	Panathinaikos

=== Most Spectacular Player ===
Player	Team
(Croatia) Mario Hezonja	Panathinaikos

== Statistical leaders ==
The Greek Basket League counts official stats leaders by stats totals, and not by per game averages. It also counts the total stats for both regular season combined.

=== Performance index rating ===
Pos	Player	Club	PIR
1	(Turkey) Kerem Kanter	Kolossos Rodou	402
2	(United States) Dominic Artis	Kolossos Rodou	382
3	(United States) Jerian Grant	Panathinaikos	355
4	(Greece) Vassilis Kavvadas	Iraklis	370
5	(United States) Alpha Diallo	Lavrio	353

=== Points ===
Pos	Player	Club	Total Points
1	(Turkey) Kerem Kanter	Kolossos Rodou	382
2	(United States) Dominic Artis	Kolossos Rodou	312
3	(United States) Tyson Carter	Lavrio	302
4	(Canada) Olivier Hanlan	Iraklis	300
5	(United States) Keith Langford	AEK	300

=== Rebounds ===
Pos	Player	Club	Total Rebounds
1	(Turkey) Kerem Kanter	Kolossos Rodou	162
2	(Greece) Vassilis Kavvadas	Iraklis	161
3	(United States) Marvin Jones	Peristeri	157
4	(Greece) Ioannis Kouzeloglou	Aris	152
5	(Greece) Nikos Chougkaz	Ionikos	142

=== Assists ===
Pos	Player	Club	Total Assists
1	(Greece) Vassilis Xanthopoulos	Kolossos Rodou	138
2	(Greece) Vassilis Mouratos	Lavrio	127
3	(United States) Dominic Artis	Kolossos Rodou	118
4	(United States) Jerian Grant	Promitheas Patras	103
5	(United States) Shelvin Mack	Panathinaikos	93

== Clubs in European-wide competitions ==
Team	Competition	Result
Panathinaikos	EuroLeague	Regular season, 16th place
Promitheas	EuroCup	Regular season, 6th place
AEK	FIBA Champions League	Playoffs, Top-16, 3rd place
Peristeri	FIBA Champions League	Regular season, 3rd place
Iraklis	FIBA Champions League	Qualification Group B, Semifinals
Iraklis	FIBA Europe Cup	Playoffs, Quarterfinals

== See also ==
- 2020–21 Greek Basketball Super Cup
- 2020–21 Greek Basketball Cup
- 2020–21 Greek A2 Basket League (2nd tier)
