= Makis Giatras =

Greek basketball coach

Makis Giatras Μάκης Γιατράς
Personal information
- Born: August 27, 1971 (age 55) Greece
- Position: Head coach
- Coaching career: 1996–present

Career history

Coaching
- 1996–1997: Panachaikos Neou Souliou
- 1998–2002: Dafni Patras
- 2003–2004: EAP Patras
- 2005–2007: Keravnos Aigiou
- 2007–2008: Kefalonia
- 2008–2009: Doxa Lefkadas
- 2009–2010: Keravnos Aigiou
- 2010–2013: Esperos Patras
- 2013–2016: Promitheas Patras
- 2017–2021: Promitheas Patras
- 2022: Promitheas Patras
- 2024: Kolossos Rodou

Career highlights
- As head coach: Greek Supercup winner (2020); Greek League Coach of the Year (2019); Greek 3rd Division champion (2015); Greek 4th Division champion (2014)

Gerasimos "Makis" Giatras (Greek: Γεράσιμος "Μάκης" Γιατράς; born August 27, 1971) is a Greek professional basketball coach who last served as the head coach for Kolossos Rodou of the Greek Basketball League (GBL) and the Basketball Champions League (BCL).

== Coaching career ==
Giatras began his coaching career in 1996. He became the head coach of the Greek club Promitheas Patras, in 2013. With Promitheas, he won the Greek 4th Division championship in 2014, and the Greek 3rd Division championship in 2015. With him as head coach, Promitheas then earned a league promotion to Greece's 2nd Division, in 2016.

With Promitheas, he coached in Greece's 1st Division, for the first time, in the 2017–18 season. In the 2018–19 season, he coached in a European-wide competition for the first time, coaching Promitheas in the FIBA Champions League, which is one of Europe's two secondary level leagues. He was named the Greek League Coach of the Year, of the 2018–19 season.

On December 5, 2024, Giatras was hired as the new head coach of Kolossos Rodou, replacing Giorgos Sigalas. Only eighteen days later, Giatras resigned from his position.

== Executive career ==
Giatras worked as the general manager of Promitheas from 2016 to 2017.
