= 2024–25 Greek Basketball Cup =

2024–25 Greek Cup
- Season: 2024–25
- Duration: 11 September 2024 – 16 February 2025
- Teams: 58

Finals
- Champions: Panathinaikos (21st title)
- Runners-up: Olympiacos
- Finals MVP: (Greece) Kostas Sloukas

Awards
- Final MVP: (Greece) Kostas Sloukas

Statistical leaders
Points	(Bulgaria) Sasha Vezenkov	19.0
Rebounds	(Bulgaria) Sasha Vezenkov	6.1
Assists	(Greece) Kostas Sloukas	6.4

The 2024–25 Greek Basketball Cup was the 50th edition of Greek top-tier level professional domestic basketball cup competition. The previous winner of the cup was Olympiacos. The cup competition started on 11 September 2024 and ended on 16 February 2025. Panathinaikos won the competition.

== Format ==
The top seven placed teams from the top-tier level Greek Basket League's 2023–24 season, gained an automatic bye to the 2024–25 Greek Cup Final 8. While the remaining teams from the 2023–24 Greek Basket League season were eliminated from the 2024–25 Greek Cup tournament.

The eighth and last 2024–25 Greek Cup team was N.E. Megaridos, the winner of the Greek UNICEF Trophy, which was contested between the teams from the Greek 2nd Division Elite League, the Greek 3rd Division National League 1, and the Greek 4th Division National League 2.

== Qualification tournament ==
=== Phase 1 ===
==== Round 1 (National League 2) ====
Navarchos Votsis	64 – 68	Panorama
Kronos Agiou Dimitriou	64 – 76	Akadimia Elefsinas
Koupa Kilkis	55 – 67	Olympos Eleftheriou
Doukas	77 – 70	KAO Melission
Mandraikos	65 – 75	EFAO Zografou
GS Gargalianon	78 – 66	Hermes Argyroupolis
Agia Paraskevi	83 – 89	NO Saronidas
Proteas Grevenon	62 – 58	Dioskouroi Kozanis
Galini Achaias	67 – 68	Apollon Smyrnis
Ergotelis	69 – 87	Dafni Dafniou
Ionios Kerkiras	86 – 68	Nikopoli Prevezas

==== Round 1 (National League 1) ====
Panellinios	52 – 61	Aiolos Agyias
Aias Evosmou	20 – 0 (w/o)	A.O. Trikala Advent
Panserraikos	57 – 77	GS Sofadon
Ethnikos Livadeias	58 – 59	Amyntas
Palaio Faliro	63 – 62	Dafni
Niki Volos	63 – 68	GAS Komotini
Aigaleo	77 – 73	Apollon Patras

==== Round 2 (National League 2) ====
Panorama	51 – 67	Olympos Eleftheriou
Apollon Smyrnis	77 – 64	NO Saronidas
GS Gargalianon	79 – 84	EFAO Zografou
Dafni Dafniou	75 – 54	Doukas
Ionios Kerkiras	83 – 74	Proteas Grevenon

==== Round 2 (National League 1) ====
Aiolos Agyias	72 – 65	Amyntas
GAS Komotini	76 – 66	Aias Evosmou
Aigaleo	95 – 78	Holargos

=== Phase 2 ===
==== Round 1 ====
Psychiko	85 – 69	Panerithraikos
Vikos Ioanninon	66 – 69	Ermis Schimatariou
Akadimia Elefsinas	89 – 74	Apollon Smyrnis
Proteas Voulas	75 – 85	NE Megaridas
Trikala Basket	61 – 73	Koroivos Amaliadas
Iraklis	76 – 79	Esperos Lamias
Palaio Faliro	55 – 78	Doxa Lefkadas
Ionios Kerkiras	59 – 110	Aigaleo
Aiolos Agyias	52 – 88	AO Mykonou
GS Sofadon	79 – 85	H.A.N.TH.
EFAO Zografou	77 – 68	GAS Komotini
Olympos Eleftheriou	48 – 60	Papagou

==== Round 2 ====
Akadimia Elefsinas	74 – 85	Psychiko
EFAO Zografou	80 – 91	Ermis Schimatariou
Dafni Dafniou	59 – 95	AO Mykonou
NE Megaridos	75 – 62	Esperos Lamias
Papagou	75 – 72	Doxa Lefkadas
Aigaleo	89 – 65	H.A.N.TH.

==== Round 3 ====
Aigaleo	109 – 100	Ermis Schimatariou
Papagou	75 – 66	Psychiko
Koroivos Amaliadas	68 – 75	NE Megaridas

=== UNICEF Trophy Final Four ===
Semifinals; 27 December 2024
AO Mykonou	80
NE Megaridas	84
Papagou	81
Aigaleo	87

Final; 28 December 2024
NE Megaridas	90
Aigaleo	69

source: EOK

== Final 8 ==
Quarterfinals; 12–13 February 2025
Promitheas	86
N.E. Megaridos	77
Panathinaikos	93
Peristeri	63
PAOK	84
AEK	65
Olympiacos	71
A.S. Karditsas	54

Semifinals; 14 February 2025
Promitheas	73
Panathinaikos	91
PAOK	75
Olympiacos	94

Final; 16 February 2025
Panathinaikos	79
Olympiacos	75

== Final ==
16 February 2025	Panathinaikos	79–75	Olympiacos
20:15	Scoring by quarter: 16–21, 14–13, 29–21, 20–20
	Pts: Nunn 17; Sloukas 17; Rebs: Hernangomez 17; Nunn 5 Asts: Sloukas 5 Grant 4	Boxscore	Pts: Vezenkov 17; Fournier 11; Rebs: Fall 10; Vezenkov 7 Asts: Williams-Goss 6 Fournier 3	Arena: Heraklion Indoor Sports Arena; Referees: Tsaroucha; Tsimpouris; Magklogiannis

== Awards ==
=== Finals Most Valuable Player ===
Player	Team
(Greece) Kostas Sloukas	Panathinaikos

=== Finals Top Scorer ===
Player	Team
(Bulgaria) (Greece) Sasha Vezenkov	Olympiacos
