= Jerai Grant =

American basketball player (born 1989)

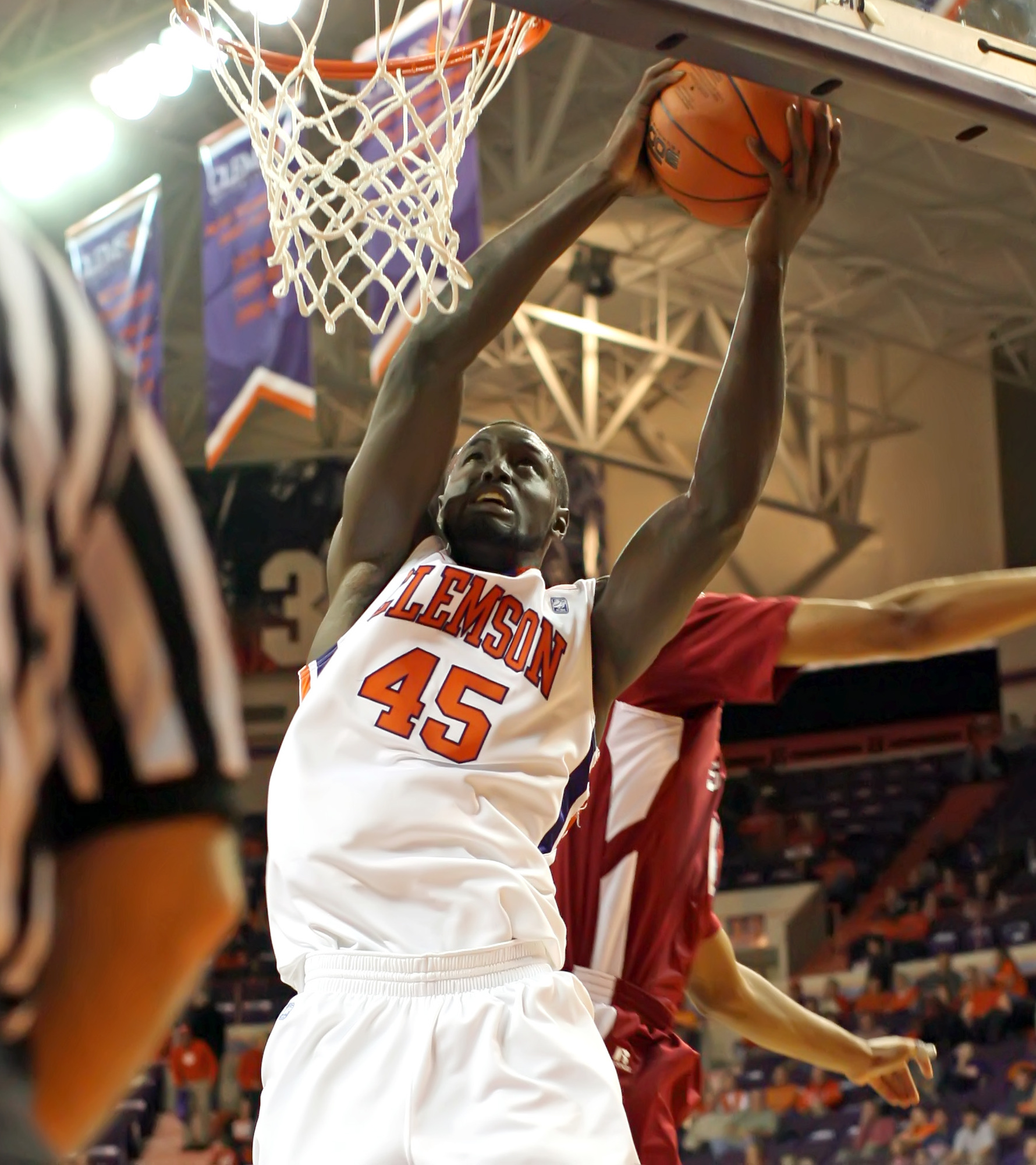
- Grant with Clemson in 2010

Personal information
- Born: January 10, 1989 (age 37) Bowie, Maryland, U.S.
- Listed height: 6 ft 8 in (2.03 m)
- Listed weight: 225 lb (102 kg)

Career information
- High school: DeMatha (Hyattsville, Maryland)
- College: Clemson (2007–2011)
- NBA draft: 2011: undrafted
- Playing career: 2011–present
- Position: Center / power forward
- Number: 45

Career history
- 2011–2012: Sydney Kings
- 2012–2013: Enel Brindisi
- 2013: Hapoel Holon
- 2013–2015: Ventspils
- 2015–2017: Neptūnas Klaipėda
- 2017–2018: Orasi Ravenna
- 2018: Trotamundos de Carabobo
- 2018–2019: Neptūnas Klaipėda
- 2019: SIG Strasbourg
- 2019–2020: AEK Athens
- 2020: Maccabi Haifa
- 2020: Manama
- 2020–2022: Promitheas Patras
- 2022–2023: Budivelnyk
- 2023: Wolves Twinsbet
- 2024: AEL Limassol
- 2024: Fuerza Regia de Monterrey
- 2025: Astros de Jalisco

Career highlights
- CIBACOPA champion (2025); LBL champion (2014); 2× LBL All-Star (2014, 2015); ACC All-Defensive Team (2011)
- Stats at Basketball Reference

Harvey Jerai Grant (born January 10, 1989) is an American professional basketball player. He played college basketball for Clemson University.

== College career ==
In his four-year career at Clemson, Grant played 127 games (63 starts) while averaging 6.7 points, 4.3 rebounds and 1.6 blocks in 17.9 minutes per game. As a senior in 2010–11, he was named to the ACC All-Defensive team and earned honorable mention All-ACC honors.

== Professional career ==
=== Sydney Kings (2011–2012) ===
On August 9, 2011, Grant signed with the Sydney Kings for the 2011–12 NBL season. He earned player of the week honors for rounds 14 and 24. In 28 games for the Kings, he averaged 11.9 points, 8.1 rebounds and 1.1 assists per game.

=== Enel Brindisi (2012–2013) ===
On July 7, 2012, Grant joined the Houston Rockets for the 2012 NBA Summer League. On July 23, he signed with Enel Brindisi of Italy for the 2012–13 season. In 30 games for Brindisi, he averaged 4.5 points and 3.4 rebounds per game.

=== Hapoel Holon (2013) ===
In July 2013, Grant signed with Hapoel Holon of Israel for the 2013–14 season. In November 2013, he left Hapoel and signed with HKK Široki of Bosnia for the rest of the season. He later left Široki before appearing in a game for them.

=== Ventspils (2013–2015) ===
On December 13, 2013, he signed with Ventspils of Latvia for the rest of the season. In 22 league games for Ventspils, he averaged 11.7 points and 5.5 rebounds per game, helping the team win the 2013–14 league championship.

On July 28, 2014, Grant re-signed with BK Ventspils for the 2014–15 season. In 28 league games for Ventspils, he averaged 11.8 points, 6.3 rebounds and 1.0 assists per game.

=== Neptūnas Klaipėda (2015–2017) ===
On July 25, 2015, Grant signed with Lithuanian team Neptūnas Klaipėda. He helped Neptūnas reach the LKL finals for the second time in club history, and helped the team have a very solid Eurocup Basketball campaign, reaching the Top16 phase. He averaged 9.6 points and 6.0 rebounds per game in the LKL, and 8.9 points and 6.2 rebounds in the EuroCup.

On July 10, 2016, Grant re-signed with Neptūnas Klaipėda. He averaged 8.8 points and 5.6 rebounds in the LKL.

=== Orasi Ravenna (2017–2018) ===
On August 21, 2017, Grant signed with Orasi Ravenna of Italian Serie A2 Basket.

=== Trotamundos de Carabobo (2018) ===
On May 13, 2018, he signed with Trotamundos de Carabobo of Venezuelan Liga Profesional de Baloncesto.

=== Return to Neptūnas Klaipėda (2018–2019) ===
On July 19, 2018, Grant returned to Neptūnas Klaipėda.

=== SIG Strasbourg (2019) ===
On June 1, 2019, Grant signed with SIG Strasbourg of the French LNB Pro A.

=== AEK Athens (2019–2020) ===
On December 27, 2019, Grant officially signed with Greek club AEK Athens for the rest of the 2019–20 season.

=== Maccabi Haifa (2020) ===
On May 24, 2020, Grant signed with Maccabi Haifa of the Israeli league.

=== Manama (2020) ===
On August 12, 2020, Grant signed with Manama Club in Bahrain.

=== Promitheas Patras (2020–2022) ===
On December 23, 2020, Grant signed with Promitheas Patras of the Greek Basketball League and the EuroCup. He averaged 11.6 points, 5.4 rebounds and 0.8 blocks per game. On July 26, 2021, Grant renewed his contract with the Greek club. In 33 league games, he averaged 10.4 points, 4.9 rebounds, 1.2 assists and 0.6 blocks, playing around 20 minutes per contest.

=== Budivelnyk (2022–2023) ===
On August 7, 2022, he has signed with Budivelnyk of the European North Basketball League.

=== Wolves Twinsbet (2023) ===
On April 22, 2023, Grant Signed with Wolves Twinsbet of the Lithuanian Basketball League (LKL).

=== AEL Limassol (2024) ===
On 15 March 2024, Grant signed with AEL Limassol of the Cyprus Basket League and the Balkan International Basketball League.

=== Fuerza Regia de Monterrey (2024) ===
On June 21, 2024, Grant signed with Fuerza Regia de Monterrey of the Mexican Liga Nacional de Baloncesto Profesional (LNBP).

=== Astros de Jalisco (2025) ===
On February 27, 2025, Grant signed with Astros de Jalisco.

== Personal life ==
Grant is the son of Harvey and Beverly Grant, and has three brothers: Jerami, Jerian and Jaelin. Harvey played college basketball at Clemson and Oklahoma, and was the 12th overall pick in the 1988 NBA draft, going on to play for 11 years in the NBA with Washington (Bullets and Wizards), Portland and Philadelphia. Grant's uncle, Horace (twin brother of Harvey), played college basketball at Clemson and was a four-time NBA champion with Chicago and Los Angeles.

Grant and his partner, Jessica, have a daughter named Halle. Grant proposed to his girlfriend during one of Neptūnas home games in 2016.
