= Dimitris Tofalos Arena =

Indoor sports arena in Proastio, Patras, Greece

- PEAK Patras Dimitris Tofalos Arena
- Dimitris Tofalos Indoor Hall
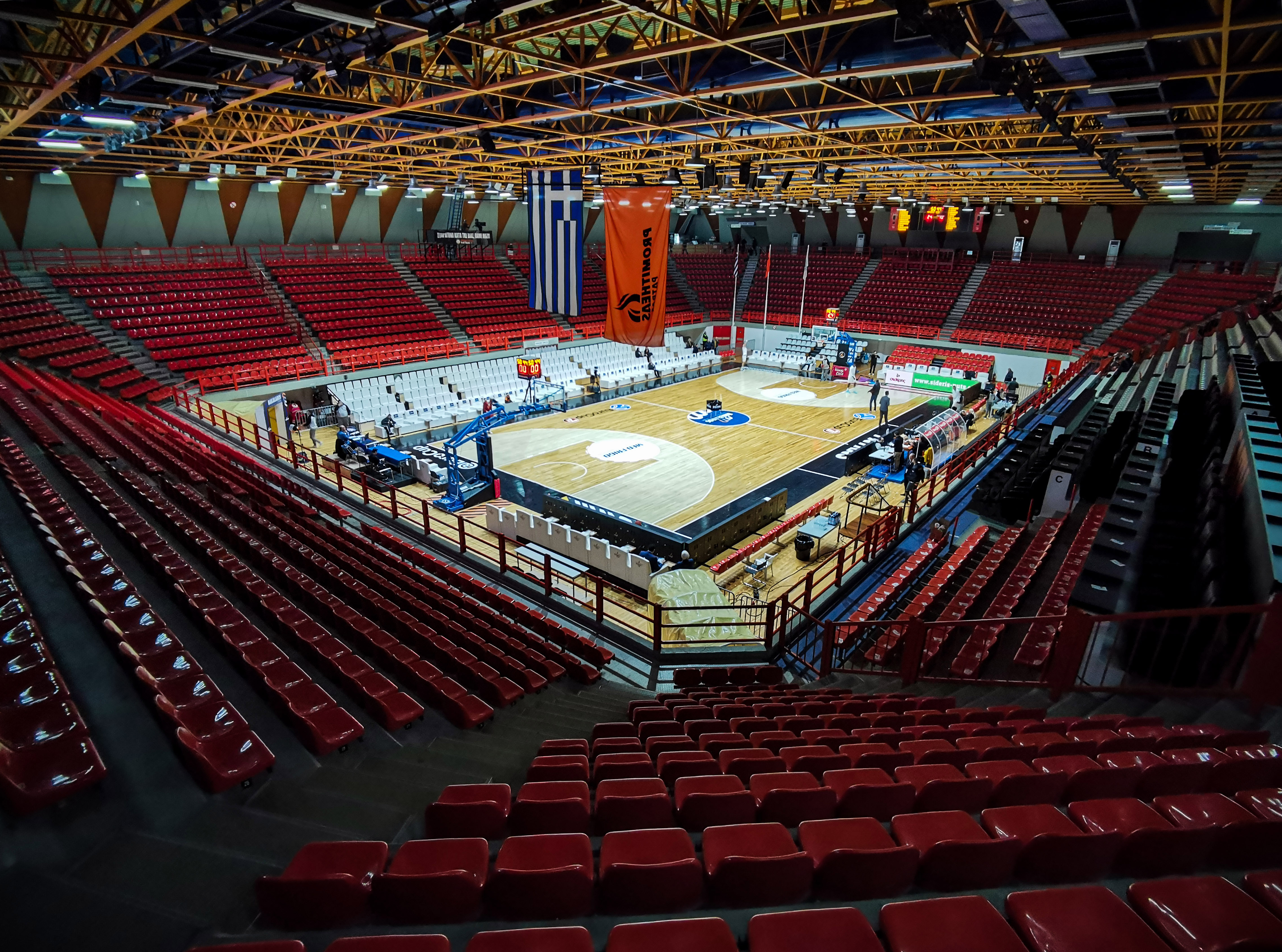
- The interior of Dimitris Tofalos Arena.
- Interactive map of Dimitris Tofalos Arena
- Full name: Pampeloponnisiako National Athletic Center Dimitris Tofalos Arena
- Location: Proastio, Patras, Greece
- Coordinates: 38°17′1″N 21°46′25″E
- Operator: General Secretariat of Sports
- Capacity: Basketball: 4,200 (permanent upper-tier seats); 5,500 (with retractable lower-tier seats)
- Surface: Parquet

Construction
- Opened: 1995
- Renovated: 2016, 2017, 2018

Tenants
- Promitheas Patras; Greek national team (2019 FIBA World Cup qualification 2nd Round Game vs. Germany) (EuroBasket 2022 qualification vs. Bulgaria) and (EuroBasket 2025 qualification vs. Netherlands)

Dimitris Tofalos Arena (alternate spelling: Dimitrios Tofalos Arena) is an indoor sports arena that is located in Proastio, Patras, Greece. The arena is named after the great Greek wrestling champion of the early 20th century, and gold medalist at the 1906 Intercalated Games, Dimitrios Tofalos. It is also known by its original official name, which is PEAK, which stands for Pampeloponnisiako Ethniko Athlitiko Kentro Patron (Greek: ΠΕΑΚ Παμπελοποννησιακό Εθνικό Αθλητικό Κέντρο), which means Pampeloponnisiako National Sports Center Patras.

The arena has a seating capacity for basketball games of 4,200 people.

== History ==
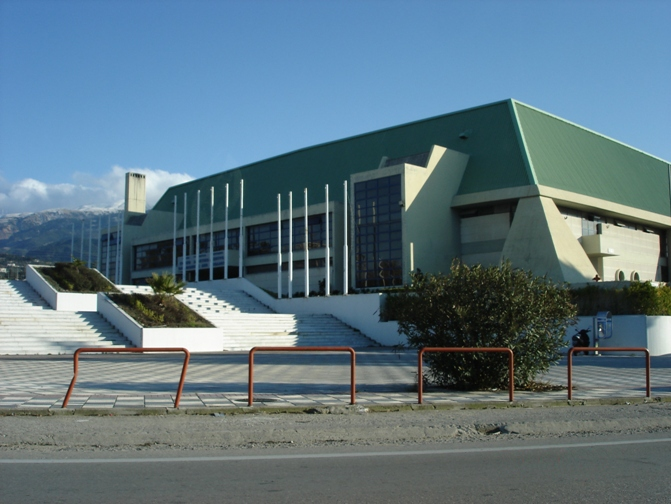
The exterior of Dimitris Tofalos Arena.

Dimitris Tofalos Arena opened in 1995. The arena was renovated in the years 2016, 2017, and 2018.

== Events hosted ==
- Basketball:
  - 1995 FIBA Under-19 World Cup - preliminaries
  - 1996 Greek Cup Final Four
  - 2003 EuroBasket Women
  - 2005 Greek All-Star Game
  - 2018 Greek All-Star Game
  - 2021 Greek Basketball Super Cup
- Volleyball:
  - 1995 Men's European Volleyball Championship - preliminaries
  - Volleyball at the 1996 Summer Olympics qualification tournament
  - World League - numerous games
- Rhythmic Gymnastics
  - 1997 Rhythmic Gymnastics European Championships
- Wrestling
  - 2001 World Wrestling Championships

== Clubs hosted ==
The following clubs have used Dimitris Tofalos Arena as their home arena at one time or another:

- Olympias Patras, basketball
- Promitheas Patras, basketball
- E.A. Patras, volleyball
- Ormi Patras, handball
