= Second cabinet of Kyriakos Mitsotakis =

Greece's New Democracy party government since June 2023

Second Cabinet of Kyriakos Mitsotakis
- Cabinet of Greece

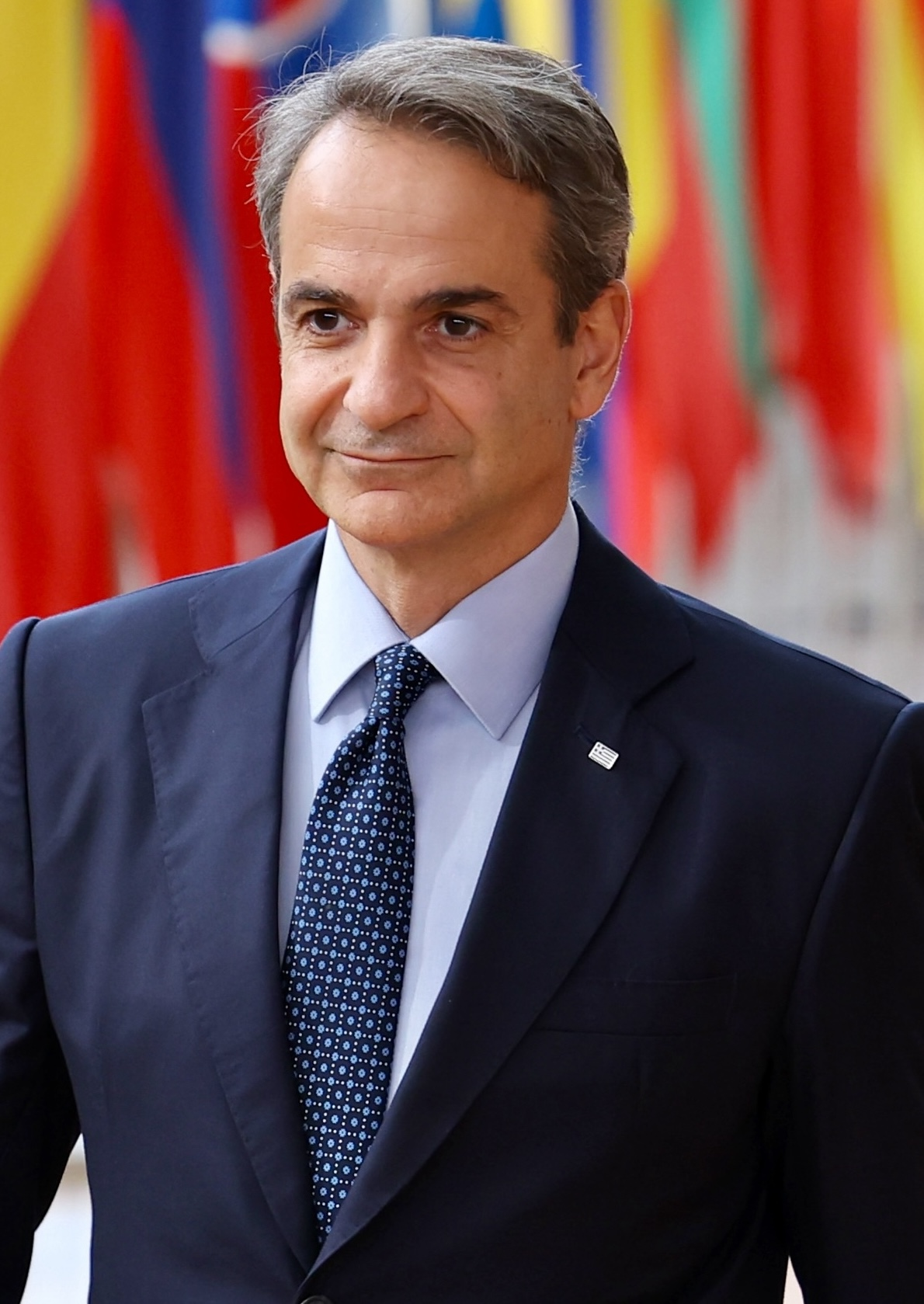
- Kyriakos Mitsotakis in 2020
- Date formed: 27 June 2023

People and organisations
- Head of state: Katerina Sakellaropoulou (until 13 March 2025); Konstantinos Tasoulas (since 13 March 2025)
- Head of government: Kyriakos Mitsotakis
- No. of ministers: 22
- Total no. of members: 62
- Member parties: New Democracy
- Status in legislature: Majority
- Opposition parties: PASOK; Syriza; Communist Party; Greek Solution; Victory; Course of Freedom; New Left; Spartans
- Opposition leader: Alexis Tsipras (until 29 June 2023); Sokratis Famellos (3 July 2023 – 27 August 2024); Nikos Pappas (27 August 2024 – 21 November 2024); Nikos Androulakis (since 21 November 2024)

History
- Election: June 2023 Greek parliamentary election
- Legislature term: 20th (2023–2027)
- Predecessor: Sarmas (caretaker)

The Second Cabinet of Kyriakos Mitsotakis was sworn in on 27 June 2023, following the parliamentary election held two days earlier. Kyriakos Mitsotakis, leader of New Democracy, was sworn in for a second term as Prime Minister of Greece on 26 June.

The government consists of a total of 62 members, including 22 ministers, 4 alternate ministers and 35 deputy ministers. Of these, 19 are not elected members of the Hellenic Parliament, but rather selected based on their political, scientific or technocratic experience. Thirteen members of the government are women.

== Cabinet composition ==
=== Prime Minister and Deputy Prime Minister ===
Office	Incumbent	Party (Note: An asterisk (*) indicates an elected member of the Hellenic Parliament.)		In office since
**Prime Minister**	**Kyriakos Mitsotakis**	*	New Democracy	26 June 2023
Deputy Prime Minister	Kostis Hatzidakis	*	New Democracy	15 March 2025

=== Ministers ===
Full ministers (in bold in the table below) are responsible for:

- the identification of ministerial policy in the cabinet
- the representation in bodies of the European Union
- the appointment of administrative agencies, public services and personnel

Alternate Ministers are directly assigned special responsibilities and powers by the prime minister, including:

- full parliamentary powers and, in conjunction with the minister, the right of (legislative) initiative
- the right to issue individual and normative acts, and to propose individual and normative decrees

Deputy ministers are assigned with responsibilities and powers by the prime minister and the full minister they report to. Deputy ministers may attend cabinet meetings.

Ministry (Note: The ministries are listed in descending order of precedence.)	Office	Incumbent	Party		In office
**1.** Ministry of the National Economy and Finance	**Minister for the National Economy and Finance**	**Kyriakos Pierrakakis**	*	New Democracy	15 March 2025 – present
**1.** Ministry of the National Economy and Finance	**Minister for the National Economy and Finance**	Kostis Hatzidakis	*	New Democracy	27 June 2023 – 15 March 2025
**1.** Ministry of the National Economy and Finance	Alternate Minister	Nikos Papathanasis	*	New Democracy	27 June 2023 – present
**1.** Ministry of the National Economy and Finance	Deputy Minister	Dimitris Markopoulos	*	New Democracy	12 June 2026 – present
**1.** Ministry of the National Economy and Finance	Deputy Minister	Giorgos Kotsiras	*	New Democracy	15 March 2025 – 12 June 2026
**1.** Ministry of the National Economy and Finance	Deputy Minister	Christos Dimas	*	New Democracy	14 June 2024 – 15 March 2025
**1.** Ministry of the National Economy and Finance	Deputy Minister	Haris Theoharis	*	New Democracy	27 June 2023 – 14 June 2024
**1.** Ministry of the National Economy and Finance	Deputy Minister	Athanasios Petralias		New Democracy	27 June 2023 – present
**2.** Ministry of Foreign Affairs	**Minister for Foreign Affairs**	**Giorgos Gerapetritis**		New Democracy	27 June 2023 – present
**2.** Ministry of Foreign Affairs	Deputy Minister	Giorgos Kotsiras	*	New Democracy	27 June 2023 – 15 March 2025
**2.** Ministry of Foreign Affairs	Deputy Minister	Alexandra Papadopoulou			27 June 2023 – present (Note: Since 12 June 2026, Papadopoulou has served as Permanent Administrative Deputy Minister for Foreign Affairs.)
**2.** Ministry of Foreign Affairs	Deputy Minister	Haris Theoharis	*	New Democracy	30 June 2025 – present
**2.** Ministry of Foreign Affairs	Deputy Minister	Tasos Chatzivasileiou	*	New Democracy	12 June 2026 – present 20 January 2025 – 27 June 2025
**2.** Ministry of Foreign Affairs	Deputy Minister	Kostas Frangogiannis			27 June 2023 – 17 January 2025
**2.** Ministry of Foreign Affairs	Deputy Minister for Greeks abroad	Giannis Loverdos	*	New Democracy	15 March 2025 – present
**3.** Ministry of National Defence	**Minister for National Defence**	**Nikos Dendias**	*	New Democracy	27 June 2023 – present
**3.** Ministry of National Defence	Deputy Minister	Thanasis Davakis	*	New Democracy	15 March 2025 – present
**3.** Ministry of National Defence	Deputy Minister	Giannis Kefalogiannis	*	New Democracy	27 June 2023 – 15 March 2025
**3.** Ministry of National Defence	Deputy Minister	Nikos Hardalias		New Democracy	27 June 2023 – 28 August 2023
**4.** Ministry of the Interior	**Minister for the Interior**	**Thodoris Livanios**		New Democracy	14 June 2024 – present
**4.** Ministry of the Interior	**Minister for the Interior**	Niki Kerameus	*	New Democracy	27 June 2023 – 14 June 2024
**4.** Ministry of the Interior	Alternate Minister for local government	Thodoris Livanios		New Democracy	27 June 2023 – 14 June 2024
**4.** Ministry of the Interior	Deputy Minister for local government	Evangelos Liakos	*	New Democracy	13 November 2026 – present
**4.** Ministry of the Interior	Deputy Minister for local government	Vassilis Spanakis	*	New Democracy	14 June 2024 – 13 November 2026
**4.** Ministry of the Interior	Deputy Minister for Macedonia and Thrace	Konstantinos Gioulekas	*	New Democracy	14 June 2024 – present
**4.** Ministry of the Interior	Deputy Minister for Macedonia and Thrace	Stathis Konstantinidis	*	New Democracy	27 June 2023 – 14 June 2024
**4.** Ministry of the Interior	Deputy Minister	Vivi Charalampogianni			27 June 2023 – present
**5.** Ministry of Education, Religious Affairs and Sports	**Minister for Education, Religious Affairs and Sports**	**Sofia Zacharaki**	*	New Democracy	15 March 2025 – present
**5.** Ministry of Education, Religious Affairs and Sports	**Minister for Education, Religious Affairs and Sports**	Kyriakos Pierrakakis	*	New Democracy	27 June 2023 – 15 March 2025
**5.** Ministry of Education, Religious Affairs and Sports	Alternate Minister for Sport	Giannis Vroutsis	*	New Democracy	28 July 2023 – present
**5.** Ministry of Education, Religious Affairs and Sports	Alternate Minister for Sport	Giannis Oikonomou	*	New Democracy	27 June 2023 – 28 July 2023
**5.** Ministry of Education, Religious Affairs and Sports	Deputy Minister for tertiary education	Nikos Papaioannou		New Democracy	15 March 2025 – present
**5.** Ministry of Education, Religious Affairs and Sports	Deputy Minister	Zetta Makri	*	New Democracy	27 June 2023 – 15 March 2025
**5.** Ministry of Education, Religious Affairs and Sports	Deputy Minister	Kostas Vlasis	*	New Democracy	15 March 2025 – present
**5.** Ministry of Education, Religious Affairs and Sports	Deputy Minister	Ioanna Lytrivi	*	New Democracy	4 January 2024 – 15 March 2025
**5.** Ministry of Education, Religious Affairs and Sports	Deputy Minister	Domna Michailidou	*	New Democracy	27 June 2023 – 4 January 2024
**6.** Ministry of Health	**Minister for Health**	**Adonis Georgiadis**	*	New Democracy	4 January 2024 – present
**6.** Ministry of Health	**Minister for Health**	Michalis Chrisochoidis	*	New Democracy	27 June 2023 – 4 January 2024
**6.** Ministry of Health	Alternate Minister	Ireni Agapidaki	*	New Democracy	4 July 2023 – present
**6.** Ministry of Health	Deputy Minister	Dimitris Vartzopoulos	*	New Democracy	13 November 2026 – present 27 June 2023 – 3 April 2026
**6.** Ministry of Health	Deputy Minister	Marios Themistokleous		New Democracy	27 June 2023 – present
**7.** Ministry of Infrastructure and Transport	**Minister for Infrastructure and Transport**	**Christos Dimas**	*	New Democracy	15 March 2025 – present
**7.** Ministry of Infrastructure and Transport	**Minister for Infrastructure and Transport**	Christos Staikouras	*	New Democracy	27 June 2023 – 15 March 2025
**7.** Ministry of Infrastructure and Transport	Alternate Minister for Transport	Giorgos Kotsiras	*	New Democracy	12 June 2026 – present
**7.** Ministry of Infrastructure and Transport	Alternate Minister for Transport	Konstantinos Kyranakis	*	New Democracy	15 March 2025 – 12 June 2026
**7.** Ministry of Infrastructure and Transport	Deputy Minister	Vasilis Oikonomou	*	New Democracy	14 June 2024 – 15 March 2025
**7.** Ministry of Infrastructure and Transport	Deputy Minister	Christina Alexopoulou	*	New Democracy	27 June 2023 – 14 June 2024
**7.** Ministry of Infrastructure and Transport	Deputy Minister	Nikos Tachiaos		New Democracy	27 June 2023 – present
**8.** Ministry of the Environment and Energy	**Minister for the Environment and Energy**	**Stavros Papastavrou**		New Democracy	15 March 2025 – present
**8.** Ministry of the Environment and Energy	**Minister for the Environment and Energy**	Theodoros Skylakakis	*	New Democracy	27 June 2023 – 15 March 2025
**8.** Ministry of the Environment and Energy	Deputy Minister	Marilena Soukouli	*	New Democracy	12 June 2026 – present
**8.** Ministry of the Environment and Energy	Deputy Minister	Nikos Tagaras	*	New Democracy	27 June 2023 – 29 May 2026 (Note: Died in office.)
**8.** Ministry of the Environment and Energy	Deputy Minister	Alexandra Sdoukou			27 June 2023 – 15 March 2025
**8.** Ministry of the Environment and Energy	Deputy Minister for energy	Nikos Tsafos			15 March 2025 – present
**9.** Ministry of Development	**Minister for Development**	**Takis Theodorikakos**	*	New Democracy	14 June 2024 – present
**9.** Ministry of Development	**Minister for Development**	Kostas Skrekas	*	New Democracy	27 June 2023 – 14 June 2024
**9.** Ministry of Development	Deputy Minister for research and innovation	Stavros Kalafatis	*	New Democracy	21 March 2025 – present
**9.** Ministry of Development	Deputy Minister for research and innovation	Aristos Doxiadis			15 March 2025 – 17 March 2025
**9.** Ministry of Development	Deputy Minister	Vassilis Spanakis	*	New Democracy	13 November 2026 – present
**9.** Ministry of Development	Deputy Minister	Lazaros Tsavdaridis	*	New Democracy	15 March 2025 – 13 November 2026
**9.** Ministry of Development	Deputy Minister	Zoe Rapti	*	New Democracy	14 June 2024 – 15 March 2025
**9.** Ministry of Development	Deputy Minister	Maximos Senetakis	*	New Democracy	27 June 2023 – 14 June 2024
**9.** Ministry of Development	Deputy Minister	Anna Mani-Papadimitriou	*	New Democracy	27 June 2023 – 15 March 2025
**10.** Ministry of Labour and Social Security	**Minister for Labour and Social Welfare**	**Niki Kerameus**	*	New Democracy	14 June 2024 – present
**10.** Ministry of Labour and Social Security	**Minister for Labour and Social Welfare**	Domna Michailidou	*	New Democracy	4 January 2024 – 14 June 2024
**10.** Ministry of Labour and Social Security	**Minister for Labour and Social Welfare**	Adonis Georgiadis	*	New Democracy	27 June 2023 – 4 January 2024
**10.** Ministry of Labour and Social Security	Deputy Minister	Kostas Karagounis	*	New Democracy	14 June 2024 – present
**10.** Ministry of Labour and Social Security	Deputy Minister	Vassilis Spanakis	*	New Democracy	27 June 2023 – 14 June 2024
**10.** Ministry of Labour and Social Security	Deputy Minister	Anna Efthymiou	*	New Democracy	15 March 2025 – present
**10.** Ministry of Labour and Social Security	Deputy Minister	Panagiotis Tsakloglou			27 June 2023 – 15 March 2025
**11.** Ministry of Citizen Protection	**Minister for Citizen Protection**	**Michalis Chrisochoidis**	*	New Democracy	4 January 2024 – present
**11.** Ministry of Citizen Protection	**Minister for Citizen Protection**	Giannis Oikonomou	*	New Democracy	28 July 2023 – 4 January 2024
**11.** Ministry of Citizen Protection	**Minister for Citizen Protection**	Notis Mitarachi	*	New Democracy	27 June 2023 – 28 July 2023
**11.** Ministry of Citizen Protection	Deputy Minister	Giannis Lampropoulos	*	New Democracy	15 March 2025 – present
**11.** Ministry of Citizen Protection	Deputy Minister	Andreas Nikolakopoulos	*	New Democracy	4 January 2024 – 15 March 2025
**11.** Ministry of Citizen Protection	Deputy Minister	Kostas Katsafados	*	New Democracy	27 June 2023 – 4 January 2024
**12.** Ministry of Justice	**Minister for Justice**	**Giorgos Floridis**			27 June 2023 – present
**12.** Ministry of Justice	Deputy Minister	Ioannis Bougas	*	New Democracy	27 June 2023 – present
**13.** Ministry of Culture	**Minister for Culture**	**Lina Mendoni**			27 June 2023 – present
**13.** Ministry of Culture	Deputy Minister	Iason Fotilas	*	New Democracy	14 June 2024 – present
**13.** Ministry of Culture	Deputy Minister	Christos Dimas	*	New Democracy	27 June 2023 – 14 June 2024
**14.** Ministry of Migration and Asylum	**Minister for Migration and Asylum**	**Thanos Plevris**	*	New Democracy	30 June 2025 – present
**14.** Ministry of Migration and Asylum	**Minister for Migration and Asylum**	Makis Voridis	*	New Democracy	15 March 2025 – 27 June 2025
**14.** Ministry of Migration and Asylum	**Minister for Migration and Asylum**	Nikolaos Panagiotopoulos	*	New Democracy	14 June 2024 – 15 March 2025
**14.** Ministry of Migration and Asylum	**Minister for Migration and Asylum**	Dimitris Kairidis	*	New Democracy	27 June 2023 – 14 June 2024
**14.** Ministry of Migration and Asylum	Deputy Minister	Sevi Voloudaki	*	New Democracy	15 March 2025 – present
**14.** Ministry of Migration and Asylum	Deputy Minister	Sofia Voultepsi	*	New Democracy	27 June 2023 – 15 March 2025
**15.** Ministry of Social Cohesion and the Family	**Minister for Social Cohesion and the Family**	**Domna Michailidou**	*	New Democracy	15 March 2025 – present
**15.** Ministry of Social Cohesion and the Family	**Minister for Social Cohesion and the Family**	Sofia Zacharaki	*	New Democracy	27 June 2023 – 15 March 2025
**15.** Ministry of Social Cohesion and the Family	Deputy Minister	Elena Rapti	*	New Democracy	15 March 2025 – present
**15.** Ministry of Social Cohesion and the Family	Deputy Minister	Katerina Papakosta-Palioura	*	New Democracy	14 June 2024 – 15 March 2025
**15.** Ministry of Social Cohesion and the Family	Deputy Minister	Maria Kefala	*	New Democracy	27 June 2023 – 14 June 2024
**16.** Ministry of Rural Development and Food	**Minister for Rural Development and Food**	**Margaritis Schinas**		New Democracy	4 April 2026 – present
**16.** Ministry of Rural Development and Food	**Minister for Rural Development and Food**	Konstantinos Tsiaras	*	New Democracy	14 June 2024 – 3 April 2026
**16.** Ministry of Rural Development and Food	**Minister for Rural Development and Food**	Lefteris Avgenakis	*	New Democracy	27 June 2023 – 14 June 2024
**16.** Ministry of Rural Development and Food	Deputy Minister	Giannis Andrianos	*	New Democracy	30 June 2025 – present
**16.** Ministry of Rural Development and Food	Deputy Minister	Dionysis Stamenitis	*	New Democracy	27 June 2023 – 27 June 2025
**16.** Ministry of Rural Development and Food	Deputy Minister	Athanasios Kavvadas	*	New Democracy	21 April 2026 – present
**16.** Ministry of Rural Development and Food	Deputy Minister	Makarios Lazaridis	*	New Democracy	4 April 2026 – 21 April 2026
**16.** Ministry of Rural Development and Food	Deputy Minister	Christos Kellas	*	New Democracy	14 June 2024 – 3 April 2026
**16.** Ministry of Rural Development and Food	Deputy Minister	Stavros Keletsis	*	New Democracy	27 June 2023 – 14 June 2024
**17.** Ministry of Maritime Affairs and Insular Policy	**Minister for Maritime Affairs and Insular Policy**	**Vasilis Kikilias**	*	New Democracy	15 March 2025 – present
**17.** Ministry of Maritime Affairs and Insular Policy	**Minister for Maritime Affairs and Insular Policy**	Christos Stylianides	*	New Democracy	12 September 2023 – 15 March 2025
**17.** Ministry of Maritime Affairs and Insular Policy	**Minister for Maritime Affairs and Insular Policy**	Miltiadis Varvitsiotis	*	New Democracy	27 June 2023 – 11 September 2023
**17.** Ministry of Maritime Affairs and Insular Policy	Deputy Minister	Stefanos Gikas	*	New Democracy	14 June 2024 – present
**17.** Ministry of Maritime Affairs and Insular Policy	Deputy Minister	Ioannis Pappas	*	New Democracy	27 June 2023 – 14 June 2024
**18.** Ministry of Tourism	**Minister for Tourism**	**Olga Kefalogianni**	*	New Democracy	27 June 2023 – present
**18.** Ministry of Tourism	Deputy Minister	Anna Karamanli	*	New Democracy	15 March 2025 – present
**18.** Ministry of Tourism	Deputy Minister	Elena Rapti	*	New Democracy	27 June 2023 – 15 March 2025
**19.** Ministry of Digital Governance	**Minister for Digital Governance**	**Dimitris Papastergiou**			27 June 2023 – present
**19.** Ministry of Digital Governance	Deputy Minister	Christos Dermentzopoulos	*	New Democracy	30 June 2025 – present
**19.** Ministry of Digital Governance	Deputy Minister	Christos Boukoros	*	New Democracy	15 March 2025 – 27 June 2025
**19.** Ministry of Digital Governance	Deputy Minister	Konstantinos Kyranakis	*	New Democracy	27 June 2023 – 15 March 2025
**20.** Ministry of the Climate Crisis and Civil Protection	**Minister for the Climate Crisis and Civil Protection**	**Evangelos Tournas**			4 April 2026 – present
**20.** Ministry of the Climate Crisis and Civil Protection	**Minister for the Climate Crisis and Civil Protection**	Giannis Kefalogiannis	*	New Democracy	15 March 2025 – 3 April 2026
**20.** Ministry of the Climate Crisis and Civil Protection	**Minister for the Climate Crisis and Civil Protection**	Vasilis Kikilias	*	New Democracy	27 June 2023 – 15 March 2025
**20.** Ministry of the Climate Crisis and Civil Protection	Deputy Minister	Kostas Katsafados	*	New Democracy	15 March 2025 – present
**20.** Ministry of the Climate Crisis and Civil Protection	Deputy Minister	Christos Triantopoulos	*	New Democracy	27 June 2023 – 4 March 2025
**20.** Ministry of the Climate Crisis and Civil Protection	Deputy Minister	Evangelos Tournas			27 June 2023 – 7 November 2025

=== Ministers of State ===
Office	Incumbent	Party		In office
**Minister of State**	**Kostis Hatzidakis**	*	New Democracy	15 March 2025 – present
**Minister of State**	Makis Voridis	*	New Democracy	27 June 2023 – 15 March 2025
**Minister of State**	Stavros Papastavrou		New Democracy	27 June 2023 – 28 March 2024
**Minister of State**	**Akis Skertsos**		New Democracy	27 June 2023 – present
Deputy Minister to the Prime Minister and Director of the Prime Minister's Office	Giannis Bratakos		New Democracy	27 June 2023 – 28 March 2024
Deputy Minister to the Prime Minister	Thanasis Kontogeorgis		New Democracy	27 June 2023 – present
Deputy Minister to the Prime Minister; Government Spokesman	Pavlos Marinakis		New Democracy	4 January 2024 – present; 26 June 2023 – present
Deputy Minister to the Prime Minister	Giorgos Mylonakis		New Democracy	14 June 2024 – present

== Controversies ==
Following an investigation into alleged fraud involving European Union agricultural subsidies, two ministers and two deputy ministers resigned from their cabinet positions: rural development minister Kostas Tsiaras and his deputy Christos Kellas, civil protection minister Giannis Kefalogiannis, and deputy health minister Dimitris Vartzopoulos. They denied any wrongdoing, saying their resignations were intended to assist the investigation.
