= Kefalogiannis =

Kefalogiannis (Greek: Κεφαλογιάννης) is a Greek surname with the female form being Kefalogianni (Greek: Κεφαλογιάννη). Notable people with this surname include:

- Aristidis Kefalogiannis (born 1960), Greek water polo player
- Ioannis Kefalogiannis (1933–2012), Greek politician and government minister
- Ioannis A. Kefalogiannis (born 1982), Greek politician
- Manolis Kefalogiannis (born 1959), Greek politician and government minister
- Olga Kefalogianni (born 1975), Greek politician and government minister
