= Caretaker Cabinet of Ioannis Sarmas =

Caretaker cabinet of Greece in 2023

- Cabinet of Greece
- Date formed: 26 May 2023
- Date dissolved: 27 June 2023

People and organisations
- Head of state: Katerina Sakellaropoulou
- Head of government: Ioannis Sarmas
- No. of ministers: 20
- Total no. of members: 22
- Member parties: Independents
- Status in legislature: Technocratic caretaker government
- Opposition parties: None (caretaker cabinets in Greece have no formal opposition)

History
- Legislature term: 19th (2023)
- Predecessor: Mitsotakis I
- Successor: Mitsotakis II

The Caretaker Cabinet of Ioannis Sarmas was sworn in on 26 May 2023 and dissolved on 27 June 2023. After an inconclusive election held on 21 May 2023 resulted in a hung parliament, President Katerina Sakellaropoulou appointed Ioannis Sarmas, the president of the Court of Audit, as caretaker prime minister. This was done according to provisions of the Greek Constitution after none of the major parties were able to form a government.

Following a second election held on 25 June 2023, the cabinet was dissolved when the second Mitsotakis cabinet was sworn in two days later.

== Cabinet list ==
=== Prime minister ===
Office	Incumbent	Party
Prime Minister	Ioannis Sarmas	Independent

=== Ministers ===
Ministry	Office	Incumbent	Party
1. Ministry of Finance	Minister for Finance	Theodore Pelagidis	Independent
2. Ministry of Development and Investment	Minister for Development and Investment	Eleni Louri-Dendrinou	Independent
3. Ministry of Foreign Affairs	Minister for Foreign Affairs	Vassilis Kaskarelis	Independent
4. Ministry of Citizen Protection	Minister for Citizen Protection	Charalambos Lalousis	Independent
5. Ministry of the Climate Crisis and Civil Protection	Minister for the Climate Crisis and Civil Protection	Evangelos Tournas	Independent
6. Ministry of National Defence	Minister for National Defence	Alkiviadis Stefanis	Independent
7. Ministry of Education and Religious Affairs	Minister for Education and Religious Affairs	Christos Kittas	Independent
8. Ministry of Labour and Social Affairs	Minister for Labour and Social Affairs	Patrina Paparrigopoulou	Independent
9. Ministry of Health	Minister for Health	Anastasia Kotanidou	Independent
10. Ministry of the Environment and Energy	Minister for the Environment and Energy	Pantelis Kapros	Independent
11. Ministry of Culture and Sports	Minister for Culture and Sports	George Koumendakis	Independent
12. Ministry of Justice	Minister for Justice	Filippos Spyropoulos	Independent
13. Ministry of the Interior	Minister for the Interior	Calliope Spanou	Independent
14. Ministry of Digital Governance	Minister for Digital Governance	Sokratis Katsikas	Independent
15. Ministry of Infrastructure and Transport	Minister for Infrastructure and Transport	Yiannis Golias	Independent
16. Ministry of Shipping and Island Policy	Minister for Shipping and Island Policy	Theodoros Kliaris	Independent
17. Ministry of Rural Development and Food	Minister for Rural Development and Food	Georgios Tsakiris	Independent
18. Ministry of Tourism	Minister for Tourism	Ioanna Dretta	Independent
19. Ministry of Immigration and Asylum	Minister for Immigration and Asylum	Daniil Esdras	Independent

=== Ministers of State ===
Office	Incumbent	Party
Minister of State	Vassilis Skouris	Independent
Government spokesman	Ilias Siakantaris	Independent
