= Shadow Cabinet of Kyriakos Mitsotakis =

The Shadow Cabinet of Kyriakos Mitsotakis was announced on 21 January 2016, ten days after the election of Kyriakos Mitsotakis as President of New Democracy. As Leader of the Opposition, Mitsotakis could appoint a shadow cabinet to assist him in his duties.

Many members of the shadow cabinet were appointed ministers in Mitsotakis' government in July 2019.

== Composition ==
Each of the main six coordinators were responsible for specific areas of policy covered by Standing Committee Groups (EFC). Each coordinator had a number of other shadow cabinet members that cover more specific policy areas. Also, Vasilis Kikilias served as a special migration coordinator, an area not covered by the EFCs.

- Leader of the Opposition - Kyriakos Mitsotakis
- Defence and Foreign Affairs Coordinator - Dora Bakoyannis
  - Defence - Thanasis Davakis
  - Foreign Affairs - Ioannis A. Kefalogiannis
  - European Affairs - Stavros Kalafatis
  - Hellenes Abroad - Anastasios Dimoschakis
- Economic Affairs Coordinator - Christos Staikouras
  - Financial Policy - Christos Dimas
  - Taxation Policy - Apostle Vesyropoulos
  - Tourism - Fotini Arabatzi
- Public Order, Public Administration and Justice Coordinator - Makis Voridis
  - Interior - Charalambos Athanasiou
  - Administrative Reform and e-Governance - George Georgantas
  - Public Order and Citizen Protection - Dimitris Kyriazidis
  - Justice, Transparency and Human Rights - Constantine Tzavaras
- Production and Trade Coordinator - Olga Kefalogianni
  - Sector Development and Competitiveness - Anna-Michelle Asimakopoulou
  - Area Infrastructure, Transport and Networks - Kostas Karamanlis
  - Marine and the Aegean - Simos Kedikoglou
  - Agriculture - George Kasapidis
  - Energy Sector, Environment and Climate Change - Kostas Skrekas
- Social Affairs Coordinator - Nikolaos Panagiotopoulos
  - Macedonia and Thrace - Theodoros Karaoglou
  - Social Security and Welfare - Vasilis Oikonomou
  - Healthcare - Christos Kellas
  - Social Solidarity - Sofia Voultepsi
- Cultural Affairs Coordinator - Theodoros Fortsakis
  - Culture - Kostas Gioulekas
  - Education - Maximos Charakopoulos
  - Research and Innovation - Maria Antoniou
  - Sports - Anna Karamanli
- Special Migration Coordinator - Vasilis Kikilias
