= 2025 Greek farmer protests =

Series of mass demonstrations

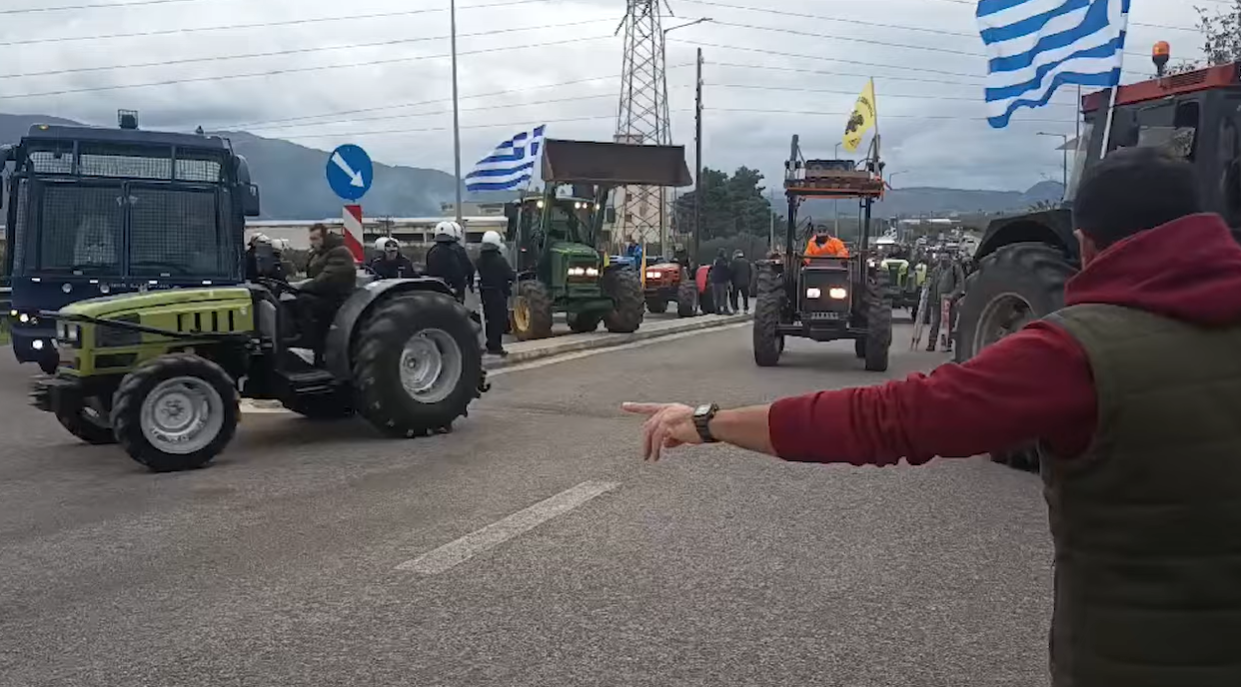
- An image of farmers protesting on 7 December 2025 published by 902.gr
- Date: 30 November 2025 – present
- Location: Greece (nationwide)
- Caused by: Delayed EU CAP subsidy payments; OPEKEPE administrative scandal; High production costs (energy, fuel); Livestock epidemics (goat plague, sheep pox); Insufficient compensation for Storm Daniel damages
- Goals: Immediate payment of outstanding subsidies; Tax-free agricultural diesel; Electricity price cap (€0.07/kWh); 100% compensation for natural disasters; Guaranteed minimum producer prices
- Methods: Road blockades; Border crossing closures; Port and airport disruptions; Tractor rallies
- Status: Ongoing

Parties
Protesters: Panhellenic Committee of Blockades; Federation of Agricultural Associations; Farmers, livestock breeders, beekeepers	Government: Greek Government; Ministry of Rural Development; Hellenic Police (MAT)

Lead figures
Protesters: Local trade union leaders	Government: Kyriakos Mitsotakis (PM), Konstantinos Tsiaras (Minister of Rural Development and Food)

Casualties
- Arrested: ~15 (as of 24 Dec)

The 2025 Greek farmer protests are a series of ongoing mass demonstrations by the agricultural and livestock farming sectors in Greece, which escalated starting 1 December 2025. These mobilizations are characterized by particular intensity; distinguishing features include not only the blockage of the country's main highways and border stations but also unprecedented clashes at and occupations of national airports and seaports.

The protests are a reaction to the freezing of EU subsidies and the sanitary crisis in livestock farming, as well as an escalation of chronic demands of the primary sector regarding production and energy costs.

== Background and Causes ==
The resurgence of mobilizations in late 2025 is attributed to an explosive combination of economic and sanitary factors that hit the primary sector after the autumn.

Specifically, a series of farmers' demands constitute chronic requirements that lead to protests every year. Briefly, the demands include guaranteed minimum prices for products to cover production costs, fair compensation from ELGA (Greek Agricultural Insurance Organization), tax-free agricultural diesel at the pump, a ceiling on agricultural electricity rates, a general reduction in energy and production costs for fertilizers, medicines, and supplies, and the abolition of VAT on means of production and necessary supplies.

However, added to the above were the detrimental consequences for the agricultural world regarding the OPEKEPE (Payment and Control Agency for Guidance and Guarantee Community Aid) scandal and the state's management of the sheep pox epidemic. These factors, along with the accumulation of general demands and an annual agro-livestock "catastrophe" (Storm Daniel 2023, Peste des Petits Ruminants 2024, Sheep Pox 2025), caused the unprecedented explosion of the 2025 protests.

=== Subsidies Scandal and OPEKEPE ===
A central trigger for the farmers' anger was the involvement in the payments of the Basic Income Support and the Eco-schemes. An investigation by the European Public Prosecutor's Office revealed extensive fraud with declarations of non-existent land and animals, leading the European Commission to freeze funds amounting to approximately 600 million euros until the completion of audits. This left thousands of producers without liquidity in the middle of the growing season. Farmers are demanding that honest citizens not be burdened and that the funds be paid by the fraudsters who embezzled them in previous years.

=== Sheep Pox Epidemic ===
The outbreak of Sheep pox during the second half of 2025 resulted in the government ordering the mandatory culling of thousands of animals and quarantine in many regions (especially in East Macedonia and Thrace and Thessaly), with livestock farmers denouncing delays and insufficiency in compensation. Breeders were also demanding sufficient vaccinations, which are rejected by the authorities, while many of them denounce both the State and the EU for fighting traditional livestock production to promote other interests and alternatives (new CAP).

== Timeline of Events ==
In late November, the Agricultural Associations of Thessaly and Macedonia held mass assemblies. On 30 November, the decision was made to bring the tractors out to the squares, with the slogan "We can't take it anymore".

Meanwhile, on the same day, Sunday, 30 November, farmers in Thessaly caught police forces by surprise. Specifically, in Karditsa, farmers from the area of Sofades and Sellana (Proastio and surrounding villages) made an unannounced and preemptive move, advancing with tractors on the E65 highway moving towards Karditsa and specifically the Delta junction. They managed to close the junction for the first time in the history of agricultural protests, preempting the police response, even moving police vehicles with straps. At the Nikaia junction in Larissa, farmers and police forces engaged in skirmishes after farmers invaded the highway from service roads and managed to break the barrier set up by MAT (riot police) vans, thus closing the Athens-Thessaloniki passage via PATHE.

1–6 December: The first major blockades are set up. In Thessaly, at the Nikaia junction (Larissa), over 1,500 tractors gather, while at the Karditsa blockade, approximately 2,000 tractors were gathered, with a total number exceeding 4,000 across Thessaly. In the central square of Larissa, livestock farmers dumped milk, straw, and corn in front of the Courthouse, declaring anger at the accumulated problems. In Thessaloniki, farmers moved tractors unexpectedly through the fields and blocked the Malgara tolls. Concurrently, farmers in Northern Greece proceeded to blockade customs offices at the borders with North Macedonia (Niki, Evzoni) and Bulgaria (Promachonas). Blockades were also set up at the borders with Turkey (Kipi). In Epirus, farmers and breeders closed the Kalpaki junction and the Ioannina-Kakavia national road at regular intervals. A blockade was also established at the Pyrgos junction on the Patras-Pyrgos highway, while in Central Greece, blockades were set up in Thebes, Domokos, and Orchomenos. On 5 December, the tension shifted to Thessaloniki. Farmers attempted to block road access to Thessaloniki Airport "Makedonia". Police used chemical agents to repel them. Since then, they have established themselves at the "Prasina Fanaria" point.

7–12 December: The total number of blockades reached 54. In Crete, which was at the epicenter of the OPEKEPE audits, serious incidents occurred, with sources describing "chaos". Farmers clashed with MAT (riot police) outside Heraklion International Airport and Chania International Airport, occupying the former. Protesters threw stones and overturned a patrol car, while police responded with extensive use of tear gas. On the Thessaly front, in a highly symbolic move, farmers and breeders of Karditsa gathered outside the political office of the Minister of Rural Development, Kostas Tsiaras. Demonstrators poured tons of milk at the entrance of the apartment building and threw hay bales. Sources on 8 December meanwhile reported 4,000 tractors at the Nikaia Larissa junction alone. On the same day, the ship Diagoras sailed empty from the port of Mytilene amidst a blockade. On 10 December, farmers with tractors and fishermen with caiques occupied the port of Volos. On 12 December, farmers of Thessaloniki paraded with tractors inside the city and proceeded to a symbolic blockade of its port.

18–22 December: A critical Panhellenic Meeting of the Blockade Committee took place on 18 December in Lefkonas, Serres. Representatives from the blockades of Nikaia, E65, Malgara, Promachonas, and other areas unanimously decided to escalate the struggle, setting the refusal of a meeting with government officials as a "red line" unless there are tangible commitments. However, it was decided to facilitate citizens during the holidays. Between 19 and 21 December, farmers proceeded to symbolically open toll stations at Oraiokastro, Sofades, and Drosochori, allowing free passage of vehicles as a sign of goodwill towards the public. Concurrently, they distributed agricultural products to passing drivers at the Tyria tolls in Epirus. On 22 December, tension occurred with a temporary blockade of the tunnels at Tempi for freight vehicles, lasting three hours. In Epirus, blockades were reinforced in Arta, Louros, and Kalpaki, while on the Egnatia Odos (at the height of Siatista), a 24-hour blockade for trucks took place.

=== De-escalation during the Christmas period ===
From the day before Christmas Eve, farmers proceeded to rearrange the tractors to the side of the road at many points (such as on the E65), in order to ensure the unhindered movement of Christmas holidaymakers. It was announced that they would hold "Christmas Eve at the blockades" in shifts, maintaining their presence on the roads.

From 23 December onwards, despite the decision of the agricultural blockades to facilitate traffic in view of the Christmas holidays, serious allegations were recorded regarding deliberate inconvenience of travelers by police forces. Farmers accused the government and the leadership of the Hellenic Police (EL.AS.) that, while tractors were lined up off the road, the police kept roads closed, activating "social automatism" (turning public opinion) against them. More specifically, Traffic Police continued to prohibit movement on sections of PATHE and the E65, diverting vehicles to provincial roads for security reasons, resulting in queues of kilometers. Farmers denounced that the MAT vans remained vertical to the road without substantial reason. On Christmas Eve, the situation partially normalized.
