= Soukoulis =

Soukoulis is a Greek surname. Notable people with the surname include:

- Marilena Vilialis-Soukoulis (born 1973), Greek politician
- Costas Soukoulis (1951–2024), Greek scientist
