= Hellenic Space Center =

Greek space organization

Hellenic Space Center (HSC) Ελληνικό Κέντρο Διαστήματος (ΕΛ.ΚΕ.Δ.)
- Official logo

Space agency overview
- Formed: 9 August 2019
- Preceding space agency: Hellenic Space Agency
- Jurisdiction: Ministry of Digital Governance
- Headquarters: 178 Kifisias Ave, 15231,Chalandri, Greece see [Personnel numbers]
- Annual budget: €1,000,000 (2024) see [Financial data]
- Space agency executives: Emmanouil Rammos, President; Nikos Sergis, Chief Executive Officer; Konstantinos Synolakis, Deputy President
- Parent department: Minister of Digital Governance: Directorate of Administrative and Financial Support; Department of Administration and Human Resources; Department of Finance and Accounting; Directorate of Research and Technological Development
- Website: https://hsc.gov.gr/ Sources: see references

The Hellenic Space Center (HSC) (Greek: Ελληνικό Κέντρο Διαστήματος, ΕΛ.ΚΕ.Δ.) is a public benefit organization operating as a Legal Entity under Private Law of a non-profit nature. It belongs to the General Government Sector and the broader Public Sector. It is responsible for shaping and implementing Greece's space policy, promoting the Greek space industry, while also managing national projects related to space technologies. It is headquartered in Athens, operates under the Ministry of Digital Governance and is supervised by the Minister of that ministry. It replaced the Hellenic Space Agency, with the transfer of all ELDO projects and programs to the newly established HSC. In 2025, Dr. Emmanouil Rammos was appointed President of HSC, replacing Professor of Space Physics at the University of Athens, Ioannis Daglis.

== Mission and activities ==
The purpose of HSC is the planning and coordination of the national space strategy, through the formulation of strategic proposals that define objectives and areas of cooperation between the Public Sector, the Private Sector, as well as the academic and research community.

HSC manages national space programs and projects related to scientific research, technology, telecommunications, agriculture, transport, e-government, and trade, among others. Particular emphasis is placed on remote sensing and the analysis of satellite data, with applications in environmental, agricultural and economic sectors.

At the same time, the Center promotes the use of space technologies and services, strengthening cooperation with European and international bodies. It also contributes to the experimental or commercial exploitation of space infrastructures and public rights, through the management of satellite services, resources and assets, as well as supporting the design of satellites, satellite systems and related equipment.

The Center acts as coordinator and representative of Greece in European and international space organizations and initiatives, aiming to maximize the return of the country's participation in space programs. In addition, it provides advisory support to the state on issues of space policy, management of public rights and obligations in space, as well as the registration and evaluation of space objects.

Through its overall activity, HSC strengthens the development of the space sector in Greece, promotes the effective utilization of space technologies and supports the development of the Greek space industry.

== International collaboration ==
HSC collaborates with public and private bodies, as well as European and international space organizations, for the development and implementation of space programs.

It collaborates with the Ministry of National Defence in cases where space programs have a national security dimension, maintaining the Ministry's operational autonomy in relevant decisions. In this context, on 26 July 2024, the Ministry of Digital Governance issued a Request For Information (RFI) for the development and operation of an integrated Telecommunications Satellite System (MILSATCOM), primarily aimed at covering the needs of the Ministry of National Defence.

It also participates in initiatives of the European Space Agency, promoting Greece's participation in international space programs.

According to the Center, systematic contacts are maintained with the Space Agencies of Japan, Italy, France, Argentina, Israel, Egypt and the United Arab Emirates.

In 2022, HSC coordinated and organized locally, in cooperation with other bodies, the 44th Scientific Assembly of COSPAR 2022. This is an international scientific conference that took place in Athens at the Athens International Conference Centre between 16 and 22 July 2022.

On 3 October 2023, during the 74th International Astronautical Congress in Baku, a Memorandum of Understanding was signed between HSC and the Italian Space Agency, while on 19 December 2023 a corresponding agreement was signed with the Spanish Space Agency. Preparatory actions had also been carried out for the signing of similar memoranda with the Space Agencies of Armenia and Egypt.

On 28 November 2024, a Memorandum of Cooperation was signed with the Egyptian Space Agency in Cairo.

On 16 October 2024, HSC and the Australian research center "SmartSat CRC" signed a Memorandum of Cooperation during the International Astronautical Congress (IAC) in Milan.

== Programs ==
Since late 2022, the Center has participated in or coordinated a variety of programs.

=== Earth Observation Satellite Mission Planning and Control Center - Tasking Team ===
Since late 2022, through funding from the Recovery and Resilience Facility of ECOFIN with a budget of €3,276,000, the sub-program "Earth Observation Satellite Mission Planning and Control Center - Tasking Team" is being implemented by HSC. It includes 4 subprojects with the main objective of providing access for the Public Sector to satellite Earth observation data through the development of a Geoinformation System based on cloud computing technologies. Thus, needs related to cadastre are covered, as well as needs for emergency situations such as natural disasters and border surveillance.

On 23 October 2023, HSC announced a call for tenders within the framework of the above program. The project, with a budget of €434,000 (Note: The project value before taxation (VAT) is significantly reduced to €350,000.), has a duration of 2 years. It is divided into 6 implementation phases and its primary objective is the automation and centralization of procedures for the distribution of geospatial satellite data to public services of the Integrated Geoinformation System, as well as the ability to store and manage them.

=== National Microsatellite Program ===
In collaboration with the Institute of Communication and Computer Systems (ICCS) of the School of Electrical Engineers and Computer Engineers of the National Technical University of Athens, a study was carried out for the design, implementation and viability of a system of small Earth observation satellites, with a budget of €60,000,000, funded by the "Greece 2.0 National Recovery and Resilience Plan". Since September 2023, following a decision of the General Secretary for Telecommunications and Post, the National Microsatellite Program was redesigned under the supervision of the Ministry of Digital Governance. The main objective of the program is to cover the needs of the Greek Public Sector in Earth observation, through thermal imaging and SAR. The National Microsatellite Program is funded by Greece through the EU Recovery and Resilience Facility and ESA provides technical support.

It constitutes an “umbrella” program under which the following sub-programs fall:

- A constellation of 13 operational Earth observation microsatellites, organised in four groups based on their objectives
  - 2 ICEYE satellites with Synthetic-Aperture Radar (SAR) launched in 2025
  - 4 FOREST satellites for thermal imaging launched in 2026 as "Hellenic Fire System"
- 7 Hyperion GR optical Earth observation satellites by Open Cosmos, first launched in 2026
- A program of 11 experimental CubeSats for “In-Orbit Validation”
- Greek Assembly, Integration, and Testing (AIT) infrastructure at the Hellenic Aerospace Industry (HAI)
- Upgrade of 3 observatories for optical communication with satellites
- Greek radar system for monitoring orbital debris

==== ICEYE satellites ====
In September 2024, HSC (together with the Ministry of Digital Governance and ESA) signed a contract with the Finnish company ICEYE manufacturing and operating Synthetic-Aperture Radar (SAR) satellites for two sovereign satellites and access to the company's existing constellation. The two Greek satellites were launched on 28 November 2025 aboard Falcon 9's Transporter-15 rideshare mission. This was the first operational Earth observation satellite launch under the National Microsatellite Program.

==== Hellenic Fire System ====
On 3 May 2026, four thermal imaging satellites (FOREST-16 to19) developed by OroraTech were launched for the National Microsatellite Program on Falcon 9's CAS500-2 rideshare mission. These satellites form the Hellenic Fire System, the country's first dedicated satellite constellation for wildfire detection and monitoring. After two weeks of instrument calibration, the Hellenic Fire System satellites captured their first thermal images over Greece.

==== Greek Cubesats In-Orbit Validation Projects ====
The Greek Cubesat Program, with the official English title "Greek Cubesats In-Orbit Validation Projects", falls under the National Microsatellite Program, and concerns the implementation of approved and funded proposals for placing 11 cubesats into orbit, with the main objective of certifying new technologies of Greek design, with the future goal of launching operational Greek cubesats into Low Earth orbit. The program involves organizations and companies funded by the Recovery and Resilience Facility.

Since June 2023, seven cubesat missions have been identified, developed by small and medium-sized enterprises and universities in Greece, with support from ESA through grants from the Recovery and Resilience Mechanism (RRF).

The agreement for the construction and launch of the cubesat constellation was signed on 2 July 2024 between the European Space Agency and the company Open Cosmos, in the presence of the Minister and Deputy Minister of Digital Governance and the General Secretary for Telecommunications and Post.

Within this framework, the seven microsatellites will be equipped with optical observation instruments [...]. In addition, as they are expected to be integrated into cooperative satellite constellations, their operational capacity will be multiplied, with the possibility of exclusive use of 20 to 24 satellites when they pass over our country and revisit times of approximately every three hours. The images collected will allow observation at a resolution from 1 meter to 3 meters. They will operate complementarily to available images of the Copernicus system (10 m resolution) and to very high-resolution satellite tasking services (30–50 cm) already implemented at HSC. In this way, the country will sufficiently and autonomously cover the entire range of Earth Observation and Remote Sensing needs.

— Ministry of Digital Governance,

These missions were scheduled to be launched in 2025 and 2026 and the last mission, Hellenic Space Dawn, was launched on 3 May 2026. The seven missions serve the fields of Earth observation, communications security, and maritime monitoring.

Mission	Organizations	Number of satellites	CubeSat size	Purpose
Phasma	Libre Space Foundation	2	3U	Detection of radio-frequency signals and monitoring for improved space situational awareness.
OptiSat	Planetek Hellas	1	6U	Optical Earth observation, secure communications with autonomous decision-making capability through Artificial intelligence and Machine learning. Cloud computing technologies.
PeakSat	Aristotle University of Thessaloniki, Prisma Electronics SA	1	3U	Laser-optical communication links with ground stations in Greece.
MICE-1	Prisma Electronics SA, Democritus University of Thrace	1	3U	Maritime monitoring through reception of AIS signals and Internet of Things (IoT) communication.
DUTHSat-2	Democritus University of Thrace, Athena Research Center, Space Asics, Prisma Electronics SA	1	6U	Detection of oil spills and monitoring of soil moisture through remote sensing with visible and near-infrared images.
ERMIS	National and Kapodistrian University of Athens, University of Patras, University of the Aegean, National Observatory of Athens, OQ Hellas	3	2 6U; 1 8U	Support for IoT applications, inter-satellite communications, hyperspectral imaging for precision agriculture and optical telecommunications.
Hellenic Space Dawn	EM Tech Space, Integrated Systems Development, Heron Engineering, Leo Space Photonics, Geosystems Hellas	2	8U	Validation of onboard data processing hardware, Earth observation and demonstration of secure optical telecommunications and inter-satellite links.

== Organizational Structure ==
The Hellenic Space Center is governed by a Board of Directors consisting of 9 members:

- President: appointed by the Ministry of Digital Governance,
- Vice-President: appointed by the Minister of Digital Governance,
- 7 members: representatives of public and private research organizations, universities, and industry stakeholders.

The Board supervises the execution of strategic programs, approves budgets, and oversees collaborations with the European Space Agency and other international organizations.

The organization of HSC is structured as follows:

- Directorate of Administrative and Financial Support
  - Department of Administration and Human Resources
  - Department of Finance and Accounting
- Directorate of Research and Technological Development

The Board of Directors (B.D.) is the governing body of the Center with a five-year term and consists of seven members. It is responsible for managing the property, administration, and representation as well as other activities of HSC. It meets at least 12 times per year.

Position	Name	Term
President	Emmanouil Rammos	March 2025 - present
CEO	Nikos Sergis	2020 - present
Member	Giorgos Nounesis	2020 - March 2025
Member	Konstantinos Synolakis	March 2025 - present
Member	Ioannis A. Dangklís	March 2025 - present
Member	Athina Kousteni	March 2025 - present
Member	Stamatios Krimizis	March 2025 - present
Member	Konstantinos Mavrokordatos	March 2025 - present

== See also ==
- European Space Agency
- Copernicus Programme
- Remote sensing
- CubeSat
