= Doxiadis =

Doxiadis (Greek: Δοξιάδης) is a Greek surname, and may refer to:

- Apostolos Doxiadis (born 1953), Greek writer
- Aristos Doxiadis (born 1951), Greek economist
- Constantinos Apostolou Doxiadis (1913–1975), Greek architect
