= Vassilis Papadopoulos =

Vassilis Papadopoulos may refer to:

- Vassilis Papadopoulos (diplomat)
- Vassilis Papadopoulos (basketball)

== See also ==
- Vasilios Papadopoulos, Greek professional footballer
