= Ioannis Sarmas =

Greek Judge and Former Prime Minister of Greece

- Ιωάννης Σαρμάς
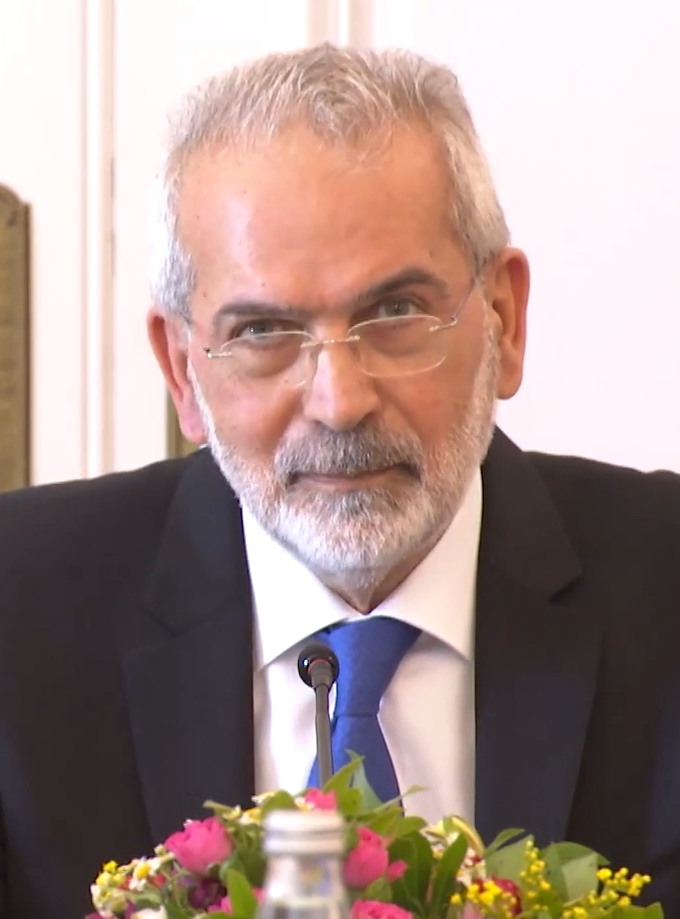
- Sarmas in 2023

Prime Minister of Greece
- Caretaker; 25 May 2023 – 26 June 2023
- President: Katerina Sakellaropoulou
- Preceded by: Kyriakos Mitsotakis
- Succeeded by: Kyriakos Mitsotakis

President of the Court of Audit
- In office 4 November 2019 – 4 November 2023
- Preceded by: Androniki Theotokatou
- Succeeded by: Sotiria Ntouni

Personal details
- Born: 21 March 1957 (age 69) Kos, Greece
- Party: Independent
- Education: University of Athens; Panthéon-Assas University
- Occupation: Judge

Ioannis Sarmas (Greek: Ιωάννης Σαρμάς; born 21 March 1957) is a Greek judge and politician who briefly served as the caretaker Prime Minister of Greece in 2023. He was also the chairman of the Greek Court of Audit from 2019 to 2023.

Because the May 2023 Greek legislative election did not result in the formation of a new government, President Katerina Sakellaropoulou appointed him to be the caretaker Prime Minister of Greece on 25 May 2023, becoming the 100th holder of that office. He served as caretaker prime minister until the formation of the new government of Kyriakos Mitsotakis after the June 2023 election.

== Biography ==
He was designated for the chairmanship of the Greek Court of Audit on 4 November 2019, serving a non-renewable four-year term as per the Constitution of Greece.

Ioannis Sarmas completed his legal studies at the National and Kapodistrian University of Athens from 1975 to 1979, graduating with distinction as the top student in his class. He was awarded scholarships by the French Government and the Greek state scholarships foundation for his postgraduate studies. He obtained three Diplôme d'études approfondies (DEA) from the Paris-Panthéon-Assas University: in Criminal Law (1980-1981), Public Law (1982-1983), and Public Economics (1983-1985). He also earned a doctorate in the law of individual rights from the same university (1981-1985), achieving the highest distinction, très honorable.

He served as a reserve officer at the Greek Air Force between 1984 and 1986. Prior to this, he studied law in Athens in the late 1970s and completed his postgraduate and doctorate studies in Paris from 1980 to 1985, with very good grades.

He began to serve the law system in January 1987, at first in the Council of State until 1993 and after in the Court of Audit.

He was a member and president of a sector in the European Court of Audit from 2002 to 2013.

As vice president of the Court of Audit, he was the head of the third sector of the Court from 2014 to 2019.

He was granted honorable doctorates from the International University of Greece, the Panteion University, and the Aristotle University of Thessaloniki in the fields of public administration and law.

Legal offices
Preceded by Androniki Theotokatou	President of the Court of Audit; 2019–2023	Succeeded by Sotiria Ntouni
Political offices
Preceded by Kyriakos Mitsotakis	Prime Minister of Greece; Caretaker; 2023	Succeeded by Kyriakos Mitsotakis
Order of precedence
Preceded by Vassiliki Thanou-Christophilou as former Prime Minister	Order of precedence of Greece; Former Prime Minister	Succeeded by Apostolos Kaklamanis as former Speaker
