= PeakSat =

Greek technology demonstration satellite

- Operator: (Greece) Aristotle University of Thessaloniki, Hellenic Space Center, European Space Agency
- COSPAR ID: 2026-067BS
- SATCAT no.: 68480
- Website: https://peaksat.spacedot.gr
- Mission duration: 6 months, 27 days (in progress)

Spacecraft properties
- Spacecraft type: 3U CubeSat

Start of mission
- Launch date: 30 March 2026, 11:02 UTC
- Rocket: Falcon 9 Transporter 16

PeakSat is a Greek technology demonstration satellite intended to test a laser-based optical communication link between low Earth orbit and the optical ground station at Holomonta in Chalkidiki. The 3U CubeSat-type small satellite was developed by undergraduate students at the Aristotle University of Thessaloniki and its development was supported by the EU's and ESA's Greek CubeSat In-Orbit Validation programme. PeakSat includes an ATLAS-1 laser terminal by the Lithuanian company Astrolight. The satellite was launched on the Transporter-16 flight of the Falcon 9 rocket on 30 March 2026.

== See also ==
- List of European Space Agency programmes and missions
