= DUTHSat-2 =

Greek Earth observation CubeSat

- Mission type: Earth observation satellite
- Operator: (Greece) Democritus University, Hellenic Space Center, European Space Agency
- Mission duration: 1 year, 4 months, 4 days (in progress)

Spacecraft properties
- Spacecraft type: 6U CubeSat
- Manufacturer: Space Asics; Athena RC; Prisma Electronics

Start of mission
- Launch date: 23 June 2025, 21:18 UTC
- Rocket: Falcon 9 Transporter-14

Orbital parameters
- Reference system: Geocentric
- Regime: Sun-synchronous
- Altitude: 510 km

DUTHSat-2 is a Greek Earth observation CubeSat developed by the Democritus University of Thrace with the support of EU and ESA. Its primary mission is to provide visible and near infrared images for monitoring of soil moisture over land as well as oil spills and water pollution over sea. The satellite is also testing the Essential TeleMetry and housekeeping (ETM) unit, an innovative black box-like device for spacecraft. DUTHSat-2 is the first space mission supported by ESA's Greek CubeSat In-Orbit Validation programme. The satellite was launched on 23 June 2025 on a Falcon 9 rocket.

== See also ==
- List of European Space Agency programmes and missions
- List of spaceflight launches in April–June 2025
