= Vassilis Papadopoulos (diplomat) =

Greek diploment and writer

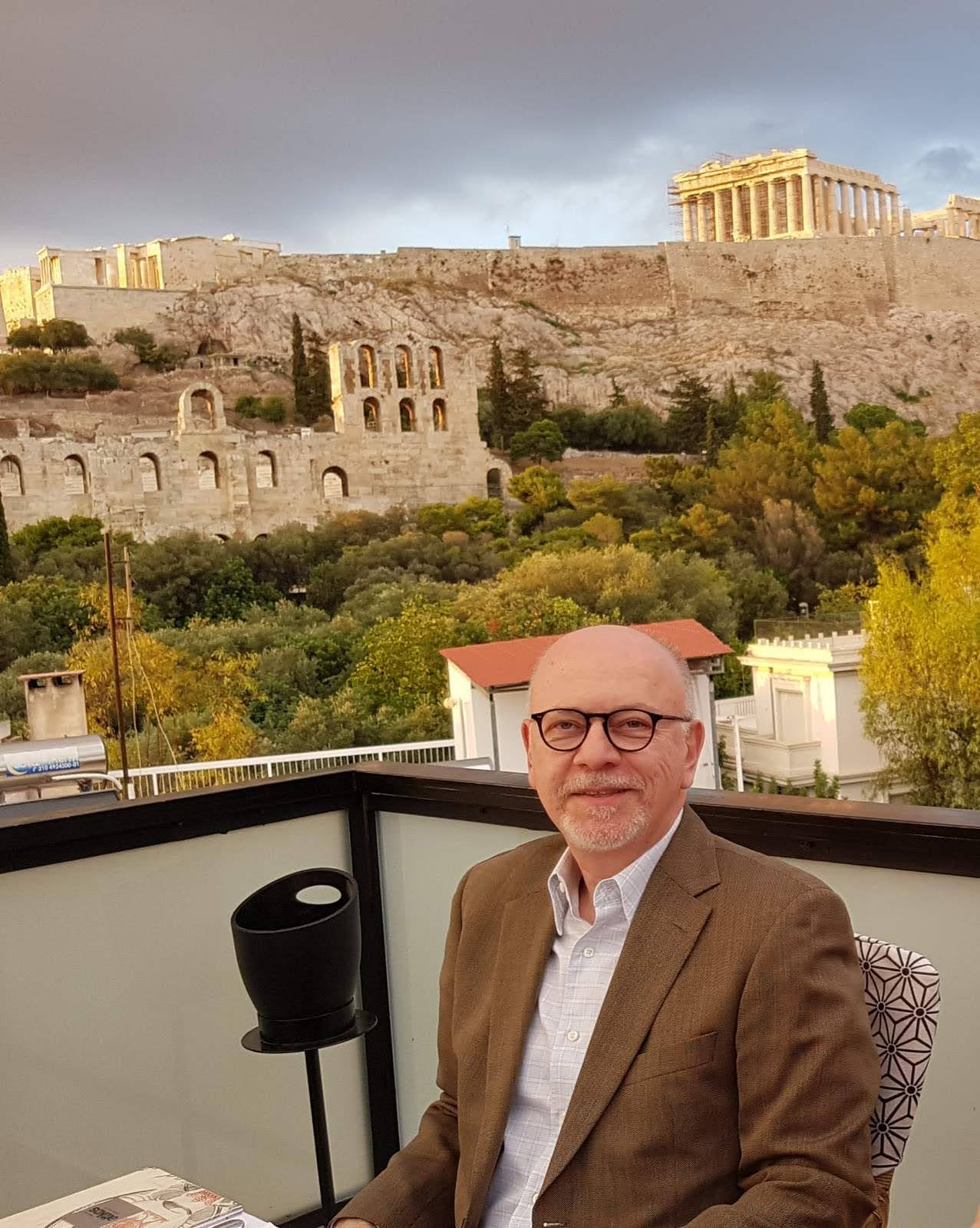
- Native name: Βασίλης Παπαδόπουλος
- Born: 1960 (age 65–66)
- Occupation: Diplomat & Writer
- Education: National and Kapodistrian University of Athens

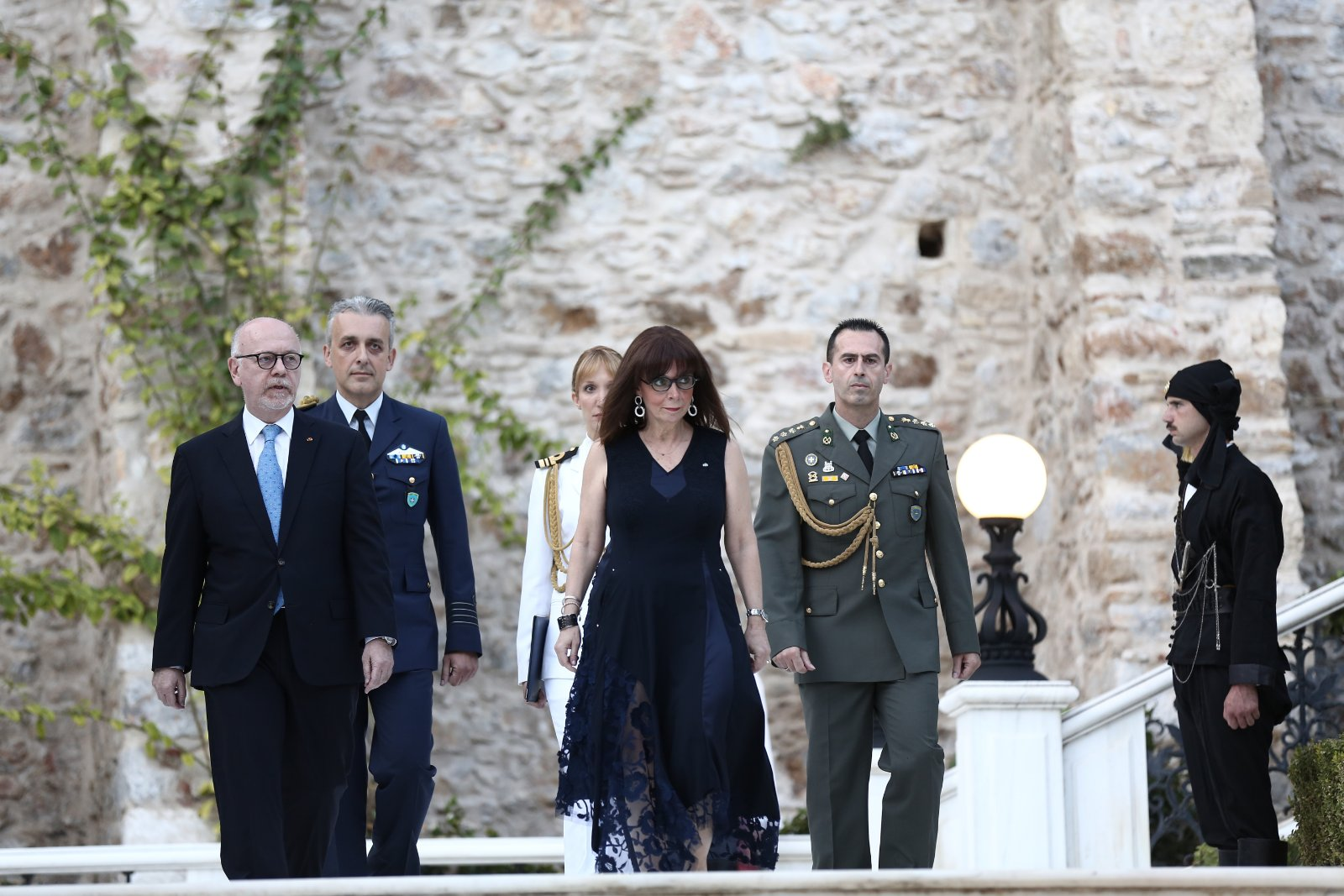
Chief of Staff of the Greek Presidency Vassilis Papadopoulos, with the President of Greece Katerina Sakellaropoulou, at the celebration of the Restoration of Democracy (07/24/2020).

Vassilis Papadopoulos is a Greek diplomat and writer. He was born in Athens in 1960.

== Education ==
He graduated from Law School of the University of Athens and completed his two masters in International and European Law in France. Apart from Greek, he speaks English, French, Spanish and Russian.

== Diplomatic Service ==
In 1986, he joined the Diplomatic corps as Attaché of Embassy of the Greek Ministry of Foreign Affairs. While in Athens, he worked mainly in departments of the Ministry having to do with European Union issues, including external relations, energy, the E.U. budget, european institutions and monetary issues. Abroad he has served at the Greek Consulate of San Francisco, at the Embassy in Kyiv, at the Embassy in Bangkok, and at the Permanent Greek Delegation at the United Nations (New York), when Greece was elected as a non-permanent member of the Security Council. He dealt with development assistance and environment issues, conflicts in Africa, as well as the reform of the UN and the Security Council in particular. He served as Ambassador of Greece in Kyiv and Bucharest. In November 2019, he was named as diplomatic advisor of the 2021 Committee. On the 13th of March 2020, he was appointed as Chief of Staff of the Greek Presidency by the President of the Hellenic Republic Katerina Sakellaropoulou. From December 2022 till December 2025 he served as Ambassador of Greece in Portugal. Currently he holds the position of Director General for Administration of the Ministry of Foreign Affairs in Athens. He has been teaching practical issues of diplomacy and culture at the Diplomatic Academy of the Ministry of Foreign Affairs for many years, based on interactive methods and simulations.

=== Αuthor's work ===
Papadopoulos is the author of short stories entitled "In the Far East, Impressions of a Diplomat" published in Greek in 2002 by Periplus publishing house, and published in English in 2020 by DartFrog Books. The book describes the mentality and way of life of the people in Asian countries, where he worked (Thailand, Myanmar, Cambodia, Laos) or traveled (Indonesia, China, Nepal), comparing them with Europe and Greece in particular.

In 2008, he published a short novel titled "Olya. Two winters and one spring ". It is the story of a young Ukrainian girl, in a relationship with a rich oligarch who is an arms dealer. She inadvertently witnesses a crime and fearing for her life, she hides at the Chernobyl Forbidden Zone, next to the destroyed nuclear plant. The book has been translated into Ukrainian and Romanian.

In 2018, Omonia publishing house in Bucharest, publishes his bilingual book (Greek and Romanian) entitled "George Seferis. Between diplomacy and poetry. " It is a presentation of the poet's work, in a way that is accessible to the Romanian public. The book is particularly focused on the conflict between the two aspects of Seferis' personality, the diplomatic representative of Greece and the writer.

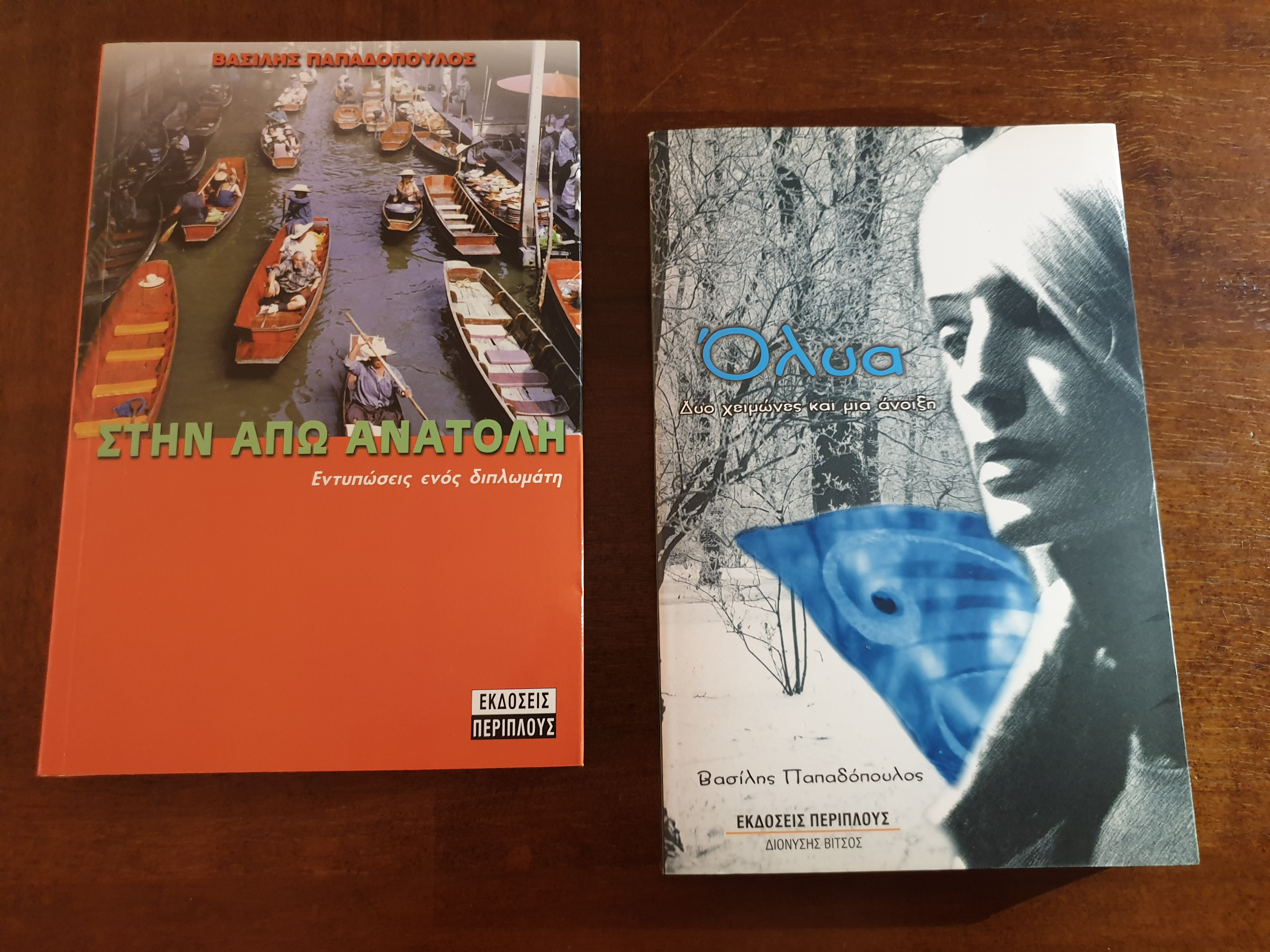
Vassilis Papadopoulos, In the Far East, Impressions of a Diplomat, Periplus Editions, 2002, & Vassilis Papadopoulos, Olya. Two winters and one spring, Periplus Editions, 2008.

In 2019 he wrote a brief essay entitled "Language as a vehicle of culture. The impact of the Greek language" published by Periplus publishing house in which he analyzes the influence of the Greek language in other cultures over the centuries. The book was translated to Romanian and published in 2020 in Bucharest.

In 2019, the essay "Diplomacy and Poetry, the Case of George Seferis" was published by Icarus publishing house and presents the poet George Seferis, focusing on his diplomatic work and the way his career influenced his literary creation. Some of his original diplomatic writings are presented for the first time, while there is a comparative analysis between his diplomatic style and his poetic language.

In 2024, under the title "The Irresistible Tendency of Greeks to Write Poetry", he published a series of 18 essays on the imprint left by Greek civilisation on a universal level, especially through literature, language and the leading masterpieces written in Greek, which changed the evolution of the world.

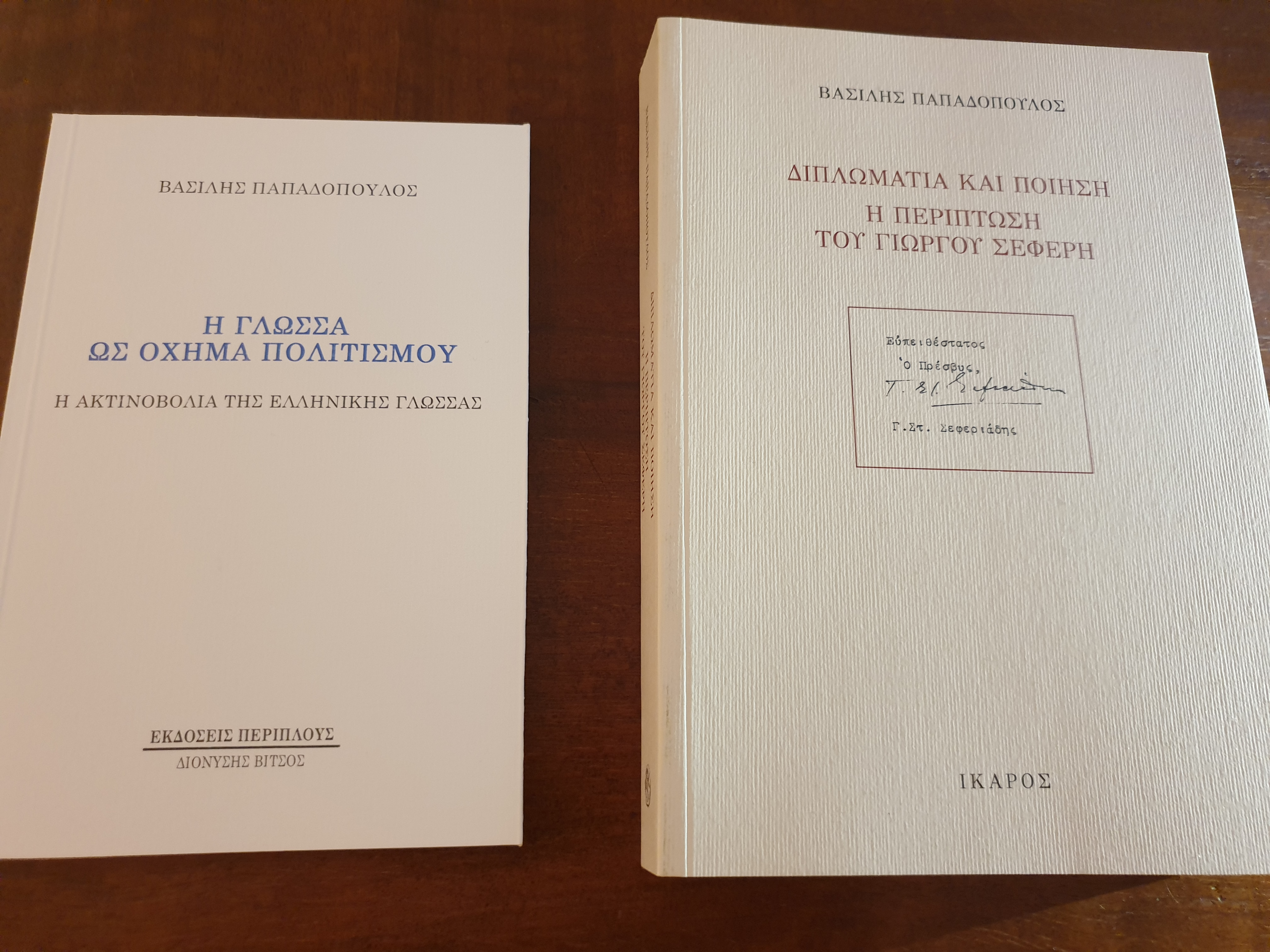
Vassilis Papadopoulos, Language as a vehicle of culture. The impact of the Greek language, Periplus Editions, 2019 & Vassilis Papadopoulos, Diplomacy and Poetry, the Case of George Seferis, Icarus Publications, 2019.

In 2025 he published a historic novel called "Princess Anna, From Constantinople to Kiyv" with a plot concerning the christianization of the Kievan Rus at the tenth century AD.

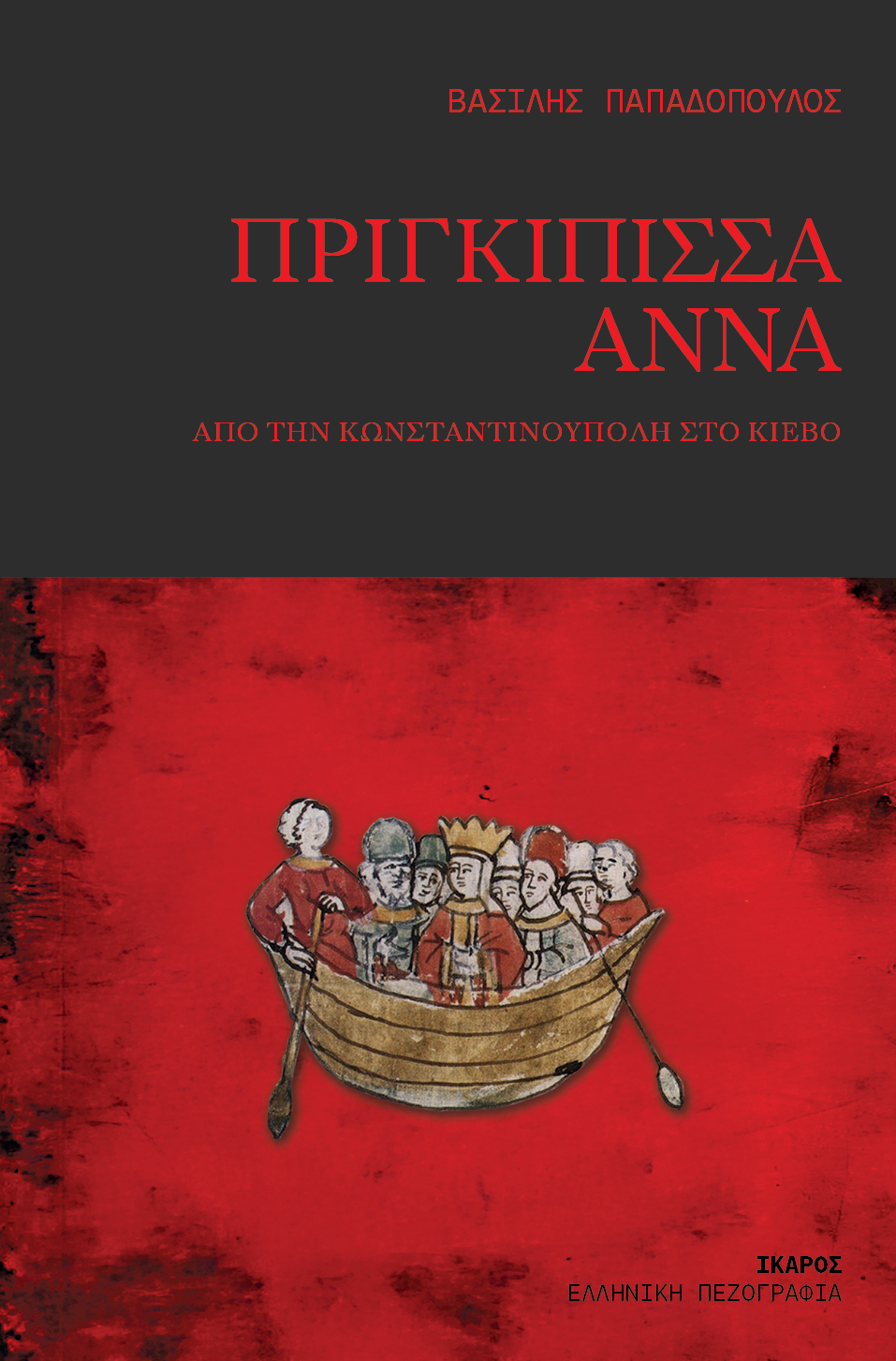
Cover photo of the book Princess Anna

Vassilis Papadopoulos has written numerous articles on literary issues and he has been delivering a series of lectures at Universities and Diplomatic Academies of various countries, both on foreign policy and international relations, as well as on culture and language.
