= OptiSat =

Greek technology demonstration satellite

- Operator: (Greece) Planetek Hellas, Hellenic Space Center, European Space Agency
- COSPAR ID: 2026-067BJ
- SATCAT no.: 68472
- Mission duration: 6 months, 27 days (in progress)

Spacecraft properties
- Spacecraft type: 6U CubeSat

Start of mission
- Launch date: 30 March 2026, 11:02 UTC
- Rocket: Falcon 9 Transporter 16

OptiSat is a Greek technology demonstration satellite designed to test laser-based communication technologies and automatic on-orbit data processing. The 6U CubeSat-type small satellite was developed by the Greek company Planetek Hellas and includes a SCOT20 laser terminal built by the German company TESAT. The satellite is also testing machine learning-based image processing technology intended for aiding the optical communication link by automatically selecting cloud-free ground stations. The development of the satellite was supported by the EU's and ESA's Greek CubeSat In-Orbit Validation programme. It was launched on the Transporter-16 flight of the Falcon 9 rocket on 30 March 2026.

== See also ==
- List of European Space Agency programmes and missions
