= ERMIS =

European CubeSat mission

- Operator: (Greece) NKUA, Hellenic Space Center, European Space Agency
- COSPAR ID: ERMIS-1: 2026-067BE; ERMIS-2: 2026-067E; ERMIS-3: 2026-067K
- Mission duration: 7 months, 4 days (in progress)

Spacecraft properties
- Spacecraft type: 2x 6U, 1x 8U CubeSat

Start of mission
- Launch date: 30 March 2026, 11:02 UTC
- Rocket: Falcon 9 Transporter 16

The ERMIS Constellation is a Greek space mission for in-orbit technology demonstration of various communication and Earth observation technologies. The satellite constellation consist of three CubeSat-type small satellites, two 6U and one 8U. The two smaller satellites (ERMIS-1 and ERMIS-2) are designed to test 5G connectivity for Internet of Things and the larger satellite (ERMIS-3) also includes an ATLAS-1 laser terminal from the Lithuanian company Astrolight. The mission was developed by the National and Kapodistrian University of Athens with the support of the EU's and ESA's Greek CubeSat In-Orbit Validation programme.

== History ==
The satellites were all launched to low Earth orbit together on the Transporter-16 flight of the Falcon 9 rocket on 30 March 2026. In November 2026, the ERMIS-3's ATLAS-1 terminal successfully established an optical connection with the Holomondas Optical Ground Station HolOGS-1 in Greece, marking Greece's first optical link with a low Earth orbit spacecraft.

== See also ==
- List of European Space Agency programmes and missions
