= Payment and Control Agency for Guidance and Guarantee Community Aid =

Greek agricultural payment scandal

- Οργανισμός Πληρωμών και Ελέγχου Κοινοτικών Ενισχύσεων Προσανατολισμού και Εγγυήσεων

Agency overview
- Formed: 27 August 1998
- Type: Private Legal entity for the public interest
- Jurisdiction: Government of Greece
- Status: dissolved
- Headquarters: Athens
- Employees: 520
- Agency executive: Giannis Kavadas interim, chairman of the board of directors
- Parent Ministry: Ministry of Rural Development and Food (Greece)
- Website: www.opekepe.gr/en/

The Payment and Control Agency for Guidance and Guarantee Community Aid (Greek: Οργανισμός Πληρωμών και Ελέγχου Κοινοτικών Ενισχύσεων Προσανατολισμού και Εγγυήσεων; OPEKEPE) was the Greek government agency responsible for distributing agricultural subsidies from the European Union to farmers in Greece.

The agency, which had been in operation since 2001, was governed by a board of directors who were accountable to the Ministry of Rural Development and Food. Its headquarters were in Athens, with six regional directorates and thirty-nine local offices. The agency was closed in 2025 amid a scandal involving misappropriation of EU funds, and its functions were transferred to the tax authorities. The agency distributed about €2 billion annually in subsidies from the EU to Greek farmers.

== Corruption scandal ==
In 2020, the European Public Prosecutor's Office (EPPO), whose remit is to combat the misuse of EU funds, opened an investigation into OPEKEPE, amid allegations of organised fraud involving agricultural subsidies. Suspects are alleged to have made claims for land they did not own and to have exaggerated the number of animals on farms. The Greek authorities estimated that €23 million had been paid out fraudulently since 2018, with some of the money going to people not involved with agriculture. Claims included banana plantations on Mount Olympus, olive groves on military airports, and pasture for sheep in the sea. An auditor at OPEKEPE, Paraskevi Tycheropoulou, was demoted after blowing the whistle on malpractice and then worked with EPPO as a scientific advisor. In March 2026, a court in Athens ordered her re-instatement and awarded her damages.

In 2024 and early 2025, in conjunction with Greek police, EPPO charged 100 suspects with agricultural fraud, mostly concerning pasture land in Crete.

In May 2025, the Athens office of EPPO carried out raids in Athens, including the headquarters of OPEKEPE, and on the island of Crete. The Greek government announced that OPEKEPE would be shut down and its functions transferred to the tax authorities. The following month, EPPO handed a 3,000 page file to the Greek parliament. By this time, Greece had already been fined €415 million by the EU on account of agricultural fraud. Five ministers, whose names appeared in the file, resigned in June 2025. They were: migration minister Voridis; deputy foreign minister Tasos Chatzivasileiou; deputy minister of rural development Dionysis Stamenitis; deputy minister of digital governance Christos Boukoros; secretary general for rural development and food Giorgos Stratakos.

There were further developments in the scandal at the end of March 2026, when EPPO asked the Greek government to lift the immunity of eleven members of parliament. Three of those named (agriculture minister Konstantinos Tsiaras, civil protection minister Ioannis A. Kefalogiannis and deputy health minister Dimitris Vartzopoulos) resigned from their ministerial positions on 3 April 2026, while the EPPO added another two names to the list. Opposition party PASOK called for a general election, saying that cabinet reshuffles were being decided not by prime minister Kyriakos Mitsotakis but by the EPPO.
