= Hellenic Space Agency =

Defunct national space agency of Greece

- Ελληνικός Διαστημικός Οργανισμός

Agency overview
- Formed: March 19, 2018 (Replaced by Hellenic Space Centre August 9, 2019)
- Superseding agency: Hellenic Space Center
- Headquarters: 11, Fragoudi str. and Al. Pantou,11, 10163 Kallithéa, Greece
- Agency executives: Christodoulos Protopappas, President; Georgios Mantzouris, CEO
- Parent department: Ministry of Digital Governance
- Website: https://www.hellenicspaceagency.gov.gr/

The Hellenic Space Agency (Greek: Ελληνικός Διαστημικός Οργανισμός, romanized: Ellinikós Diastimikós Organismós), abbreviated as the HSA (Greek: ΕΛΔΟ, ELDO), was the national space agency of Greece always in cooperation with Hellenic National Space Committee. It was founded at 19 March 2018 as a public limited company by the Ministry of Digital Policy, Telecommunications and Media. On August 9, 2019, it was replaced by the Hellenic Space Center (HSC). (Greek: Ελληνικό Κέντρο Διαστήματος).

== Satellites of Greece ==
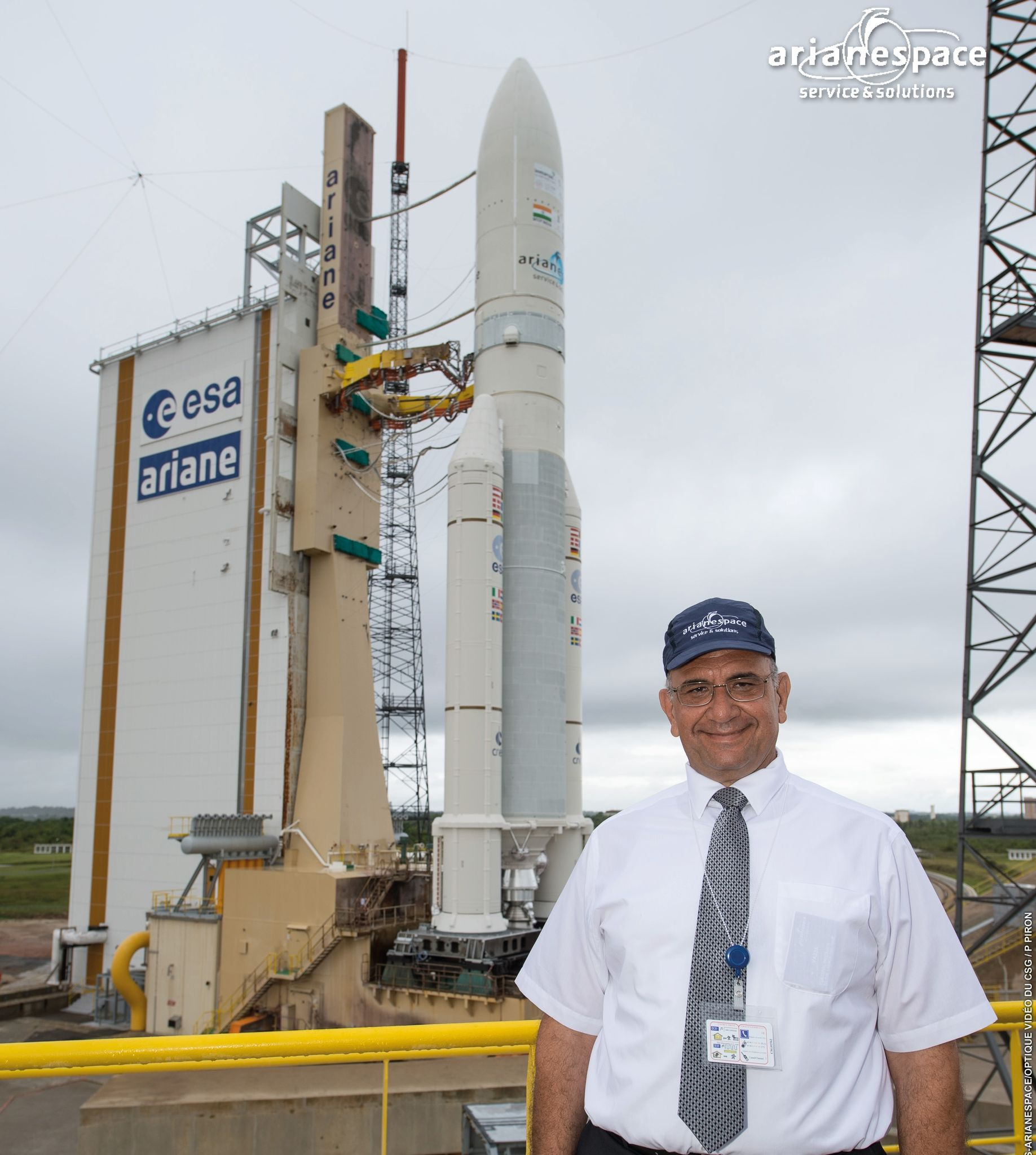
Christodoulos Protopapas, June 29, 2017, French Guiana. Launch day of the HELLAS SAT 3 satellite.

Hellas Sat is a company active in the field of satellite systems and communications. It was established in 2001 and has assumed, through contracts, the exclusive rights to use the orbital position of Greece and Cyprus (39° East). In 2013 OTE sold its shares (99.05%) for €208 million to Arabsat Cyprus Ltd, a subsidiary of Arabsat. In its two privately owned satellite control stations - one in Greece and the other in Cyprus - it employs 65 scientifically qualified people. The CEO of the company for a number of years is Christodoulos Protopapas.

- Hellas Sat 2
- Hellas Sat 3
- SaudiGeoSat-1/HellasSat-4
- UPSat

== Purpose ==
Its purpose was to shape the country's space strategy, to promote the participation of Greece in space programs, and to participate in space events.
