= Ioannis Kefalogiannis =

Greek politician (1933–2012)

Ioannis Kefalogiannis Ιωάννης Κεφαλογιάννης MP

Minister of Public Order
- In office July 2, 1989 – October 12, 1989

Minister for Tourism
- In office May 24, 1990 – September 2, 1991

Minister of the Interior
- In office December 3, 1992 – September 14, 1993

Personal details
- Born: 6 December 1932 Anogeia, Crete, Greece
- Died: 20 January 2012 (aged 79) Athens, Greece
- Party: National Radical Union; New Democracy
- Spouse: Eleni Vardinogiannis
- Children: Olga Kefalogianni MP & 2 other daughters
- Education: University of Athens

Ioannis Kefalogiannis (Greek: Ιωάννης Κεφαλογιάννης; 6 December 1932 – 20 January 2012) was a Greek politician who served as a Member of Parliament from 1958 to 1964, and again from 1974 to 2004. During this time he was briefly Minister of Public Order, Minister for Tourism, and Minister of the Interior. His daughter is the Cabinet Minister Olga Kefalogianni.

== Legal problems ==
Greek Special Crimes Task Force officials accused Kefalogiannis of asking them to alter their deposition against a cannabis grower so that he could be acquitted, in exchange for the appointment of an officer's wife in a public service post and a favorable treatment for all of them within the police force. Kefalogiannis dismissed accusations, putting them down to a plot against him.

The case took place in late 2003, when Kefalogiannis was still a deputy of the governing New Democracy party.

=== Trial and sentence ===
On 23 September 2008, Kefalogiannis was found guilty in a Rethymno city court of attempting to harbor a criminal and of instigating others to commit perjury; Kefalogiannis received a one-year suspended prison sentence. Kefalogiannis denied all the charges and said he would appeal. He accused the prosecutor of attempting to slander his name and claimed the trial was politically motivated.

The prime minister's office announced that Kefalogiannis would abstain from his duty as the prime minister's advisor until the probe was completed. Nevertheless, Kefalogiannis' case caused great discomfort to Costas Karamanlis' government. On 19 December 2008, the appeal was heard and Kefalogiannis was sentenced to a 5-mοnth suspended prison sentence.

Political offices
Preceded by Panagiotis Markopoulos	Minister of Public Order; 1989	Succeeded by Dimitrios Manikas
Preceded by Georgios Souflias	Minister for Tourism; 1990–1991	Succeeded by Dionysis Livanos
Preceded by Nikolaos Kleitos	Minister of the Interior; 1992–1993	Succeeded by Ioannis Georgakis
