= Hellenic Space Dawn =

Greek CubeSat mission

- Operator: (Greece) EMTech Space, Hellenic Space Center, European Space Agency
- COSPAR ID: HELIOS: 2026-100E; SELENE: 2026-100B
- Website: https://hsd.emtech.global

Spacecraft properties
- Spacecraft type: 2x 8U CubeSat

Start of mission
- Launch date: 3 May 2026, 7:00 UTC
- Rocket: Falcon 9 (CAS500-2 mission)
- Launch site: SLC-4E
- Contractor: SpaceX

Hellenic Space Dawn (HSD) is a Greek space mission aiming to demonstrate communication technologies and on-board data processing for Earth observation applications. The mission consist of two 8U CubeSat-type small satellites (Helios and Selene) equipped with laser communication terminals. HSD was launched on 3 May 2026.

== Background ==
The mission was developed by the Greek group of companies EMTech Space with the support of the EU's and ESA's Greek CubeSat In-Orbit Validation programme. The two spacecraft are based on the CubeSat bus developed by the Bulgarian company EnduroSat. The mission's laser terminals were built by AAC Clyde Space. The mission uses the EASE-Rise ground mission control solution by Telespazio Germany.

== See also ==
- List of European Space Agency programmes and missions
