= Corinthia (constituency) =

Parliamentary constituency of Greece

- Εκλογική περιφέρεια Κορινθίας
- Constituency for the Hellenic Parliament
- Major Region: Peloponnese
- Major settlements: Corinth, Loutraki, Kiato, Xylokastro

Current constituency
- Created: 2015
- Seats: 3
- Members: Christos Dimas; Nikos Tagaras; Marilena Vilialis-Soukoulis
- Subdivisions: Corinthia

Corinthia is a constituency of the Hellenic Parliament.

== Members ==
June 2023
Party	Members
New Democracy	Christos Dimas
New Democracy	Nikos Tagaras
New Democracy	Marilena Vilialis-Soukoulis

== See also ==
- List of parliamentary constituencies of Greece
