= Christos Dimas =

Greek politician (born 1980)

Christos Dimas MP
- Χρίστος Δήμας
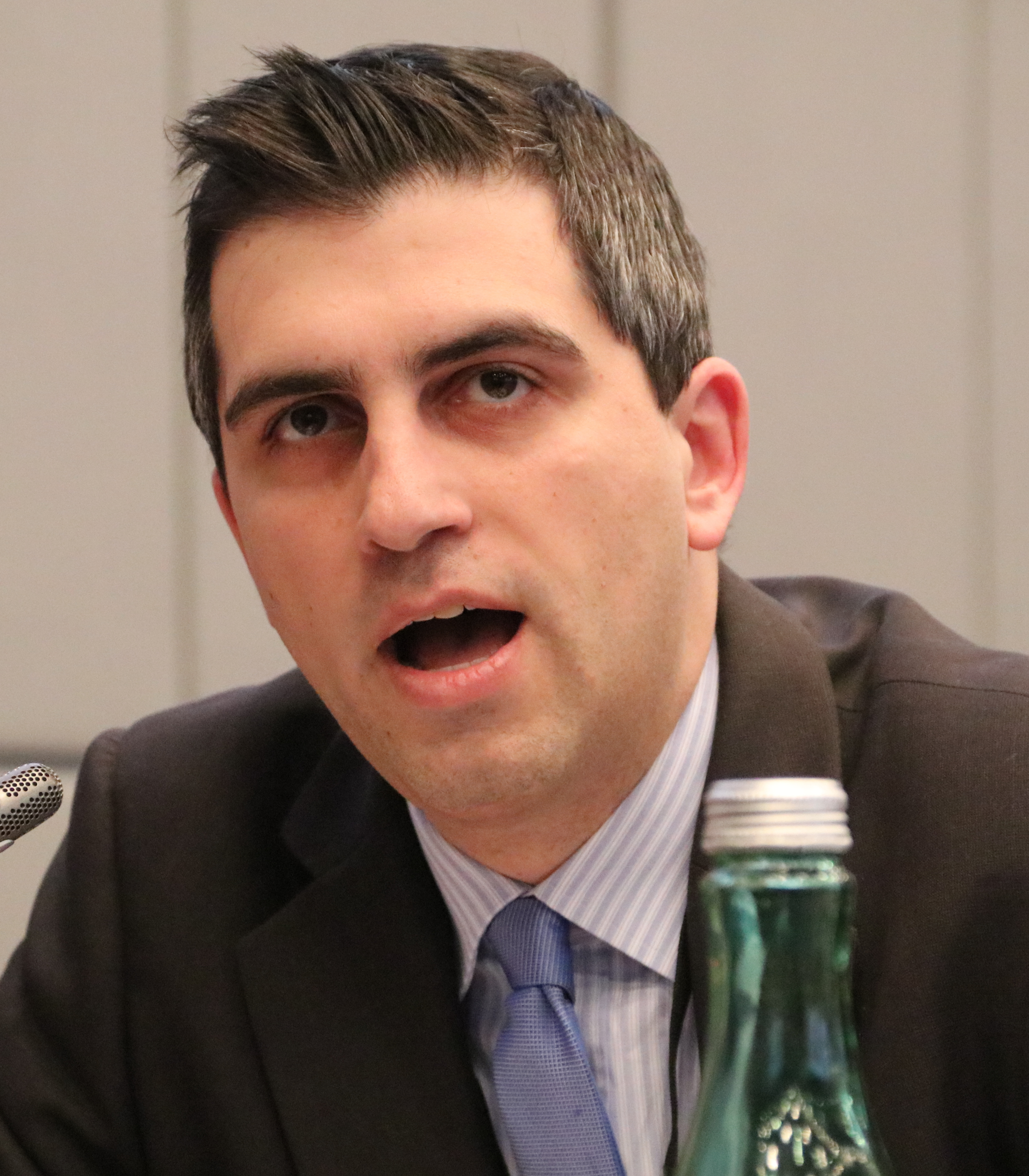
- Dimas in 2017

Minister of Infrastructure and Transport
- Incumbent
- Assumed office 15 March 2025
- Preceded by: Christos Staikouras

Member of the Hellenic Parliament
- Incumbent
- Assumed office 17 May 2012
- Constituency: Corinthia

Personal details
- Born: 29 May 1980 (age 46) Athens
- Party: New Democracy
- Parent: Stavros Dimas (father)
- Education: National and Kapodistrian University of Athens
- Website: www.dimas.gr

Christos Stavrou Dimas (Greek: Χρίστος Σταύρου Δήμας; born 29 May 1980) is a Greek lawyer and politician, serving as Minister of Infrastructure and Transport from March 2025 in the second cabinet of Kyriakos Mitsotakis. He has been a member of the Hellenic Parliament since 2012, and has served as deputy minister for tax policy since 2024. He is the son of Stavros Dimas.
