= Marilena Vilialis-Soukoulis =

Greek politician (born 1973)

- Μαριλένα Βιλιάλη-Σούκουλη

Member of the Hellenic Parliament
- Incumbent
- Assumed office June 2023
- Constituency: Corinthia

Deputy Minister at the Ministry of the Environment and Energy
- Incumbent
- Assumed office 12 June 2026

Personal details
- Born: 1973 (age 52–53) Corinthia, Greece
- Party: New Democracy

Marilena Vilialis-Soukoulis (Greek: Μαριλένα Βιλιάλη-Σούκουλη) (born 1973 in Corinthia) is a Greek politician from New Democracy. She was elected to the Hellenic Parliament from Corinthia in the June 2023 Greek legislative election. On 12 June 2026, she was appointed to the government as Deputy Minister at the Ministry of the Environment and Energy.

== See also ==
- List of members of the Hellenic Parliament, 2019
- List of members of the Hellenic Parliament, June 2023
