= Ministry of Digital Governance (Greece) =

Government ministry of Greece

- Υπουργείο Ψηφιακής Διακυβέρνησης
- Coat of arms of the Hellenic Republic
- Incumbent; Dimitris Papastergiou since 27 June 2023
- Appointer: Prime Minister of Greece
- Inaugural holder: Kyriakos Pierrakakis
- Formation: 8 July 2019
- Website: mindigital.gr

The Ministry of Digital Governance (Greek: Υπουργείο Ψηφιακής Διακυβέρνησης) is a government department of Greece. It was initially formed on 27 June 2011 as the Ministry of Administrative Reform and Electronic Governance (Υπουργείο Διοικητικής Μεταρρύθμισης και Ηλεκτρονικής Διακυβέρνησης). On 27 January 2015, it was merged with the Ministry of the Interior and the Ministry of Public Order and Citizen Protection to form the Ministry of the Interior and Administrative Reorganization (Υπουργείο Εσωτερικών και Διοικητικής Ανασυγκρότησης). It was revived as two distinct ministries on 5 November 2016: the Ministry of Administrative Reorganization (Υπουργείο Διοικητικής Ανασυγκρότησης) and the Ministry of Digital Policy, Telecommunications and Media (Υπουργείο Ψηφιακής Πολιτικής, Τηλεπικοινωνιών και Ενημέρωσης). The former was reabsorbed by the Ministry of the Interior on 9 July 2019, while the latter was renamed the Ministry of Digital Governance. The incumbent minister in the Second Cabinet of Kyriakos Mitsotakis is Demetrius Papastergiou, who also served as Mayor of Trikala.

== History ==
The ministry was formed on 27 June 2011 by Presidential Decree 65/2011, following a proposal by Prime Minister George Papandreou. It resulted from the division of the Ministry of the Interior, Decentralization and Electronic Governance and, in particular, the establishment of the General Secretariat of Public Administration and Electronic Governance as a separate ministry. The latter was established at the recommendation of the Ministry of the Interior, Public Administration and Decentralization in 1995 with the merger of the then ministries of the Presidency of the Government and of the Interior, and comprised services from the former department. The Ministry was based in Vasilissis Sofias Avenue 15, Athens.

The responsibilities of the Ministry extended to all matters concerning Public Administration, both at the organizational level, such as the simplification of administrative procedures, the relations between citizens and the state, the organization of public services and administrative reform, and in terms of human resources, such as legislation on civil servants and private-law employees of the public sector. It was also responsible for the fundamental electronic governance and development of information technology and new technologies in public administration (e.g. "open government"). The Ministry also included the Corps of Inspectors-Controllers of Public Administration and the General Inspector of Public Administration, the National Printing Office and independent authorities of the Ombudsman and the Supreme Council for Civil Personnel Selection (ASEP). Finally it supervised the National Centre for Public Administration and Local Government (EKDDA) and the "Information Society" limited company.

According to the Prime Ministerial decision Y4/21.6.2012, it ranked fifth in the hierarchy of the cabinet ministries.

Among the competencies of the current ministry is government oversight of the Hellenic Space Agency.

== List of ministers ==
=== Administrative reform and electronic governance (2011–2015) ===
Name	Took office	Left office	Party	Notes
Dimitris Reppas	27 June 2011	17 May 2012	PASOK	Cabinet of George Papandreou until 11 November 2011; Cabinet of Lucas Papademos thereafter
Pavlos Apostolidis	17 May 2012	21 June 2012	Independent	Caretaker Cabinet of Panagiotis Pikrammenos
Antonis Manitakis	21 June 2012	25 June 2013	Democratic Left	Cabinet of Antonis Samaras
Kyriakos Mitsotakis	25 June 2013	27 January 2015	New Democracy	Cabinet of Antonis Samaras

=== Administrative reorganization (2016–2019) ===
Name	Took office	Left office	Party	Notes
Olga Gerovasili	5 November 2016	29 August 2018	Syriza	Second Cabinet of Alexis Tsipras
Mariliza Xenogiannakopoulou	29 August 2018	9 July 2019	Syriza	Second Cabinet of Alexis Tsipras

=== Digital policy, telecommunications and media (2016–2019) ===
Name	Took office	Left office	Party	Notes
Nikos Pappas	5 November 2016	9 July 2019	Syriza	Second Cabinet of Alexis Tsipras

=== Digital governance (since July 2019) ===
Name	Took office	Left office	Party	Notes
Kyriakos Pierrakakis	9 July 2019	26 Μay 2023	Independent	Cabinet of Kyriakos Mitsotakis
Sokrates Katsikas	26 May 2023	26 June 2023	Independent	Caretaker Cabinet of Ioannis Sarmas
Demetrius Papastergiou	27 June 2023		Independent	Second Cabinet of Kyriakos Mitsotakis
