= Dimitris Papastergiou =

Greek politician (born 1973)

- Δημήτρης Παπαστεργίου
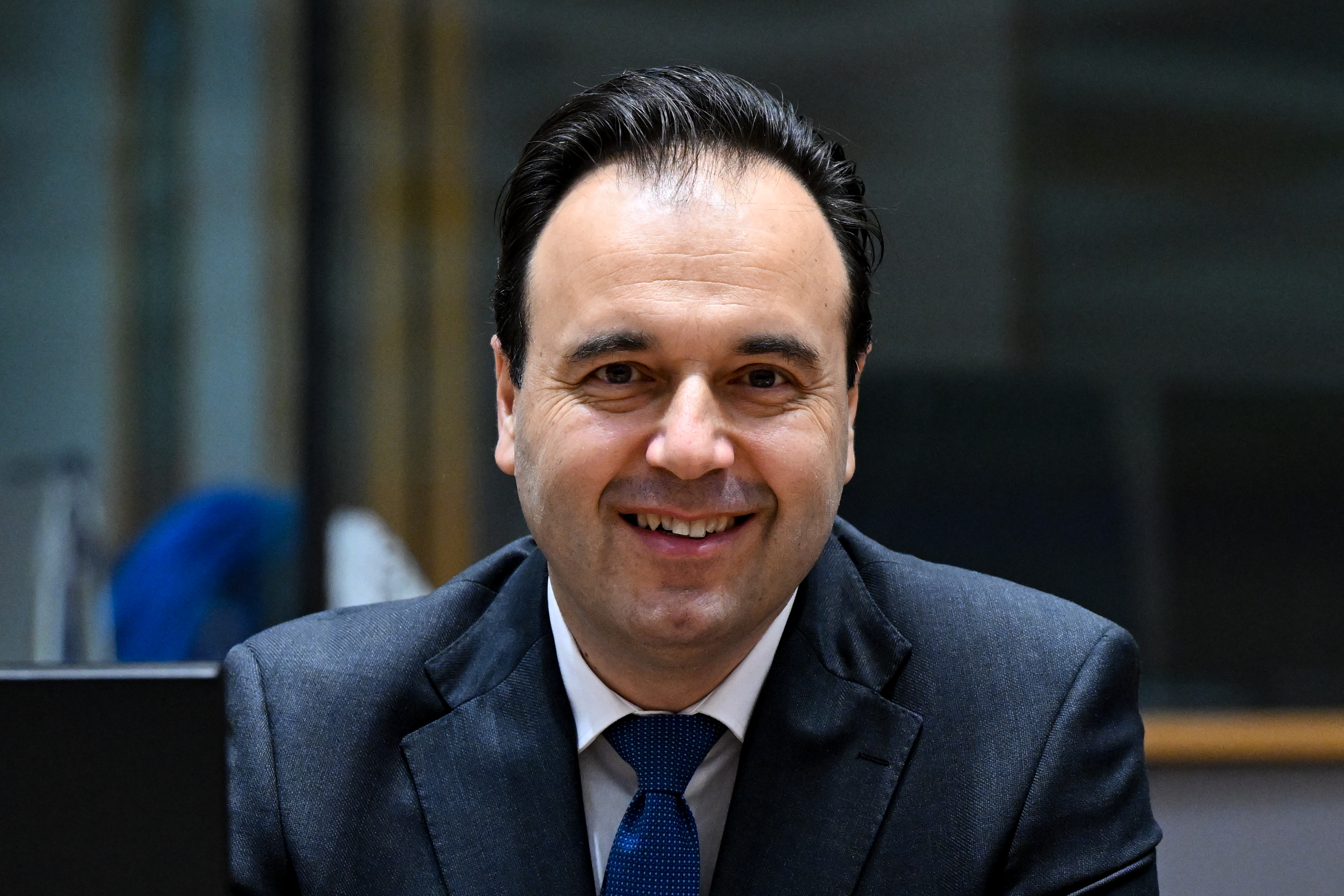
- Papastergiou in 2024

Minister of Digital Governance
- Incumbent
- Assumed office 27 June 2023
- Prime Minister: Kyriakos Mitsotakis
- Preceded by: Sokratis Katsikas

Personal details
- Born: 2 November 1973 (age 52) Trikala, Greece
- Education: National Technical University of Athens

Dimitris Papastergiou (Greek: Δημήτρης Παπαστεργίου; born 2 November 1973) is a Greek politician serving as minister of digital governance since 2023. From 2014 to 2023, he served as mayor of Trikala.
