= Tasos Chatzivasileiou =

Greek politician (born 1981)

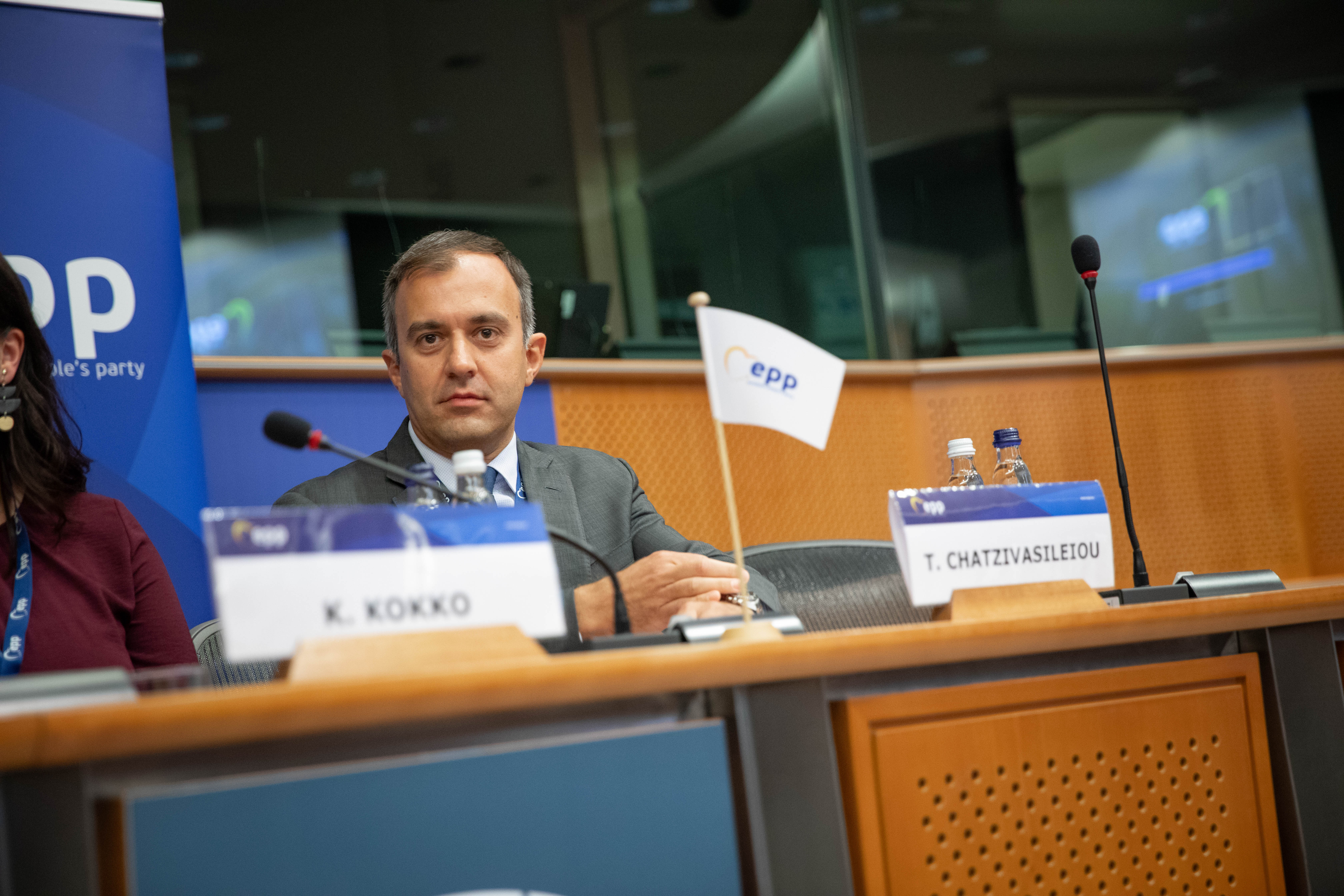
- Chatzivasileiou in 2023

Deputy Minister of Foreign Affairs
- Incumbent
- Assumed office 20 January 2025 and 12 June 2026
- Preceded by: Kostas Fragogiannis

Member of the Hellenic Parliament
- Incumbent
- Assumed office 7 July 2019
- Constituency: Serres

Personal details
- Born: 26 August 1981 (age 45)
- Party: New Democracy
- Website: www.achatzivasileiou.gr

Anastasios "Tasos" Georgiou Chatzivasileiou (Greek: Τάσος Χατζηβασιλείου; born 26 August 1981) is a Greek politician who is a deputy minister of foreign affairs. He has been a member of the Hellenic Parliament since 2019, representing Serres in northern Greece for the centre-right New Democracy party.

In June 2025, Chatzivasileiou resigned as a deputy minister of foreign affairs after he was implicated in the OPEKEPE scandal, which involved the misuse of farm subsidies from the European Commission. After a thorough investigation by the Athens Persecutors Office, it was proven that Chatzivasileiou had no relation to the misuse issue or any other illegal action. He was innocent and the case was filed. Chatzivasileiou returned to the government on June 2026, as Deputy Foreign Minister, responsible for European Affairs and the Hellenic Presidency of the EU.
