= Olga Kefalogianni =

Greek politician (born 1975)

Olga Kefalogianni MP
- Όλγα Κεφαλογιάννη
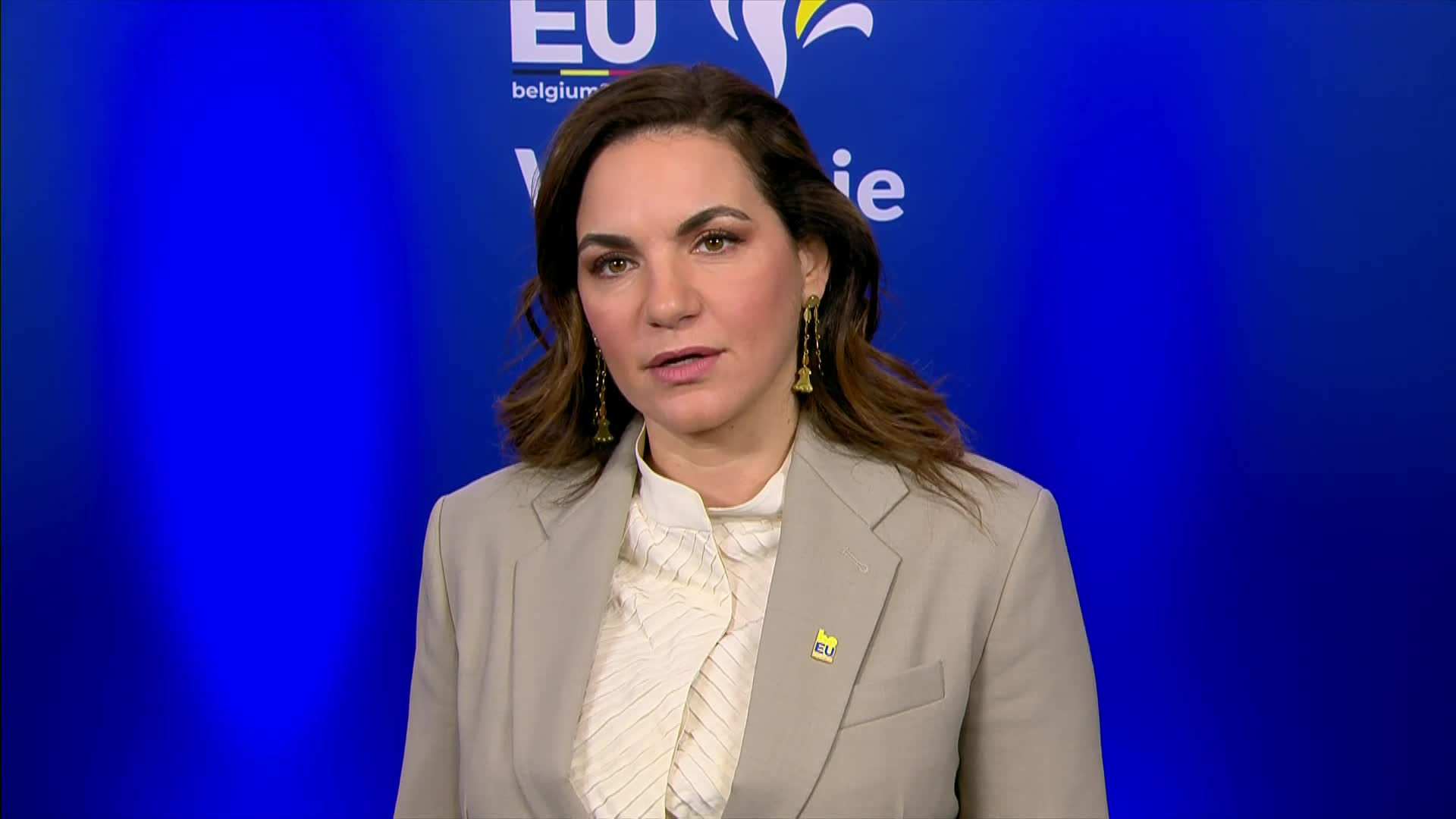
- Kefalogianni in 2024

Minister of Tourism
- Incumbent
- Assumed office 27 June 2023
- Prime Minister: Kyriakos Mitsotakis
- Preceded by: Ioanna Dretta
- In office 21 June 2012 – 27 January 2015
- Prime Minister: Antonis Samaras
- Preceded by: Tatiana Karapanagioti (Culture and Tourism)
- Succeeded by: Giorgos Stathakis (Economy, Infrastructure, Shipping and Tourism)

Personal details
- Born: 29 April 1975 (age 51) Athens, Greece
- Party: New Democracy
- Spouses: Manos Pentheroudakis (2010–2020); Minos Matsas (2021-2024)
- Relatives: Ioannis Kefalogiannis (father); Eleni Vardinogiannis (mother); Ioannis A. Kefalogiannis (cousin)
- Education: University of Athens; King's College London; Tufts University
- Website: www.olgakefalogianni.gr

Olga Kefalogianni (Greek: Όλγα Κεφαλογιάννη; born 29 April 1975) is a Greek politician who served as Minister of Tourism of the Greek Government from 2012 to 2015 and again since 27 June 2023. She was appointed in this position by Prime Minister Antonis Samaras in June 2012. She is a Member of Parliament, representing the New Democracy party. She has been elected two times in the Cretan prefecture of Rethymno in the 2007 and 2009 general elections. In the 6 May 2012 elections, she was voted in the first position as Member of Parliament for the important District A of Athens constituency. She was re-elected in the same position in the 17 June 2012 elections, and again in January 2015. She is the daughter of former minister and member of parliament, the late Ioannis Kefalogiannis. She was married to Greek businessman Manos Pentheroudakis from 2010 to 2020. She was married to composer Minos Matsas from 2021 to 2024. In September 2021 she became a mother of twins - one son and one daughter.

She obtained a bachelor's degree in law from the National and Kapodistrian University of Athens in 1997. She holds a Master of Laws degree (LLM) in commercial and business law from King's College London (1998). In 2006, she earned a second master's degree in international affairs from The Fletcher School of Law and Diplomacy at Tufts University.

She has written a book titled "The role of the European Union on the Cyprus issue".

Political offices
Preceded by Tatiana Karapanagioti as Minister of Culture and Tourism	Minister of Tourism; 2012–2015	Succeeded by Giorgos Stathakis as Minister of Economy, Infrastructure, Shipping and Tourism
