= Aristos Doxiadis =

Greek economist

Aristos Doxiadis or Doksiadis (Greek: Αρίστος Δοξιάδης) (born 1951) is a Greek economist. He researches and writes on the Greek economy, and especially on the institutional aspects of the present Greek economic crisis.

== Life ==
Doxiadis grew up in Athens and studied social sciences and economics in Harvard and the University of London. He began his career with studies of public policy for the Greek government and international organizations, participated in pilot programs of the European Commission to combat poverty throughout Europe, and then ran a consulting firm.

He has worked for fifteen years as a private equity executive. He has developed deal structure instruments (i.e., shareholders’ agreements, capital structures, exit mechanisms and incentive schemes) to bring international private equity practices within the framework of Greek law and business culture, has sat on the boards of about fifteen companies (including a bank in Bulgaria), and has taken an active executive role in some of those; and has structured the first leveraged buy-out by Greek private equity.

His experience includes acquisitions and divestments (i.e., business analysis, valuation, negotiation, due diligence, financial engineering), governance (strategic direction at Board level, incentive schemes, reporting and monitoring systems, senior recruitment, stakeholder alignment), new business and start-ups (territorial expansion, related business units, pure start-ups, strategic acquisitions), operations (logistics, costing and MIS, key account development), and finally fund raising and fund structuring.

Recently he has started work on the institutional and cultural determinants of economic development in Greece. He spent four months at the Centre for Governance and Public Management, Warwick Business School, as visiting fellow, doing research on this subject. He has published several related articles in Greek magazines, and some of his work has been published in English and German. Since 2010, he has been writing articles about the crisis and the Greek economy institutions. The Invisible Rift is his first book.

=== Political career ===
Doxiadis was appointed deputy minister for research and innovation at the Ministry of Development in Greece on March 14, 2025 by prime minister Kyriakos Mitsotakis, only to resign 24 hours after joining the government - marking the shortest career in public service.

=== Book ===
The Invisible Rift talks about the essence of the crisis, and the lack of depth of the Greek economy, in a simple way through the reality of businesses and the institutions that surround them, analyzing the causes of the crisis to look ahead.

=== Articles ===
1. The Wrong Shaft ("Ο λάθος άξονας")
2. The Plumbing of Our House ("Τα υδραυλικά του σπιτιού μας")
3. The Destruction of an Institution ("Η καταστροφή ενός θεσμού")
4. Minor Linguistic Observation
5. Who's Afraid of Recovery? ("Ποιός φοβάται την ανάκαμψη;")

== Sources ==
- OpenDemocracy.net: Aristos Doxiadis
- OpenFund.com - Partners: Aristos Doxiadis
- Reinventing Greece: Talking with an Angel Investor - interview with Aristos Doxiadis (10 July 2013)
- Greeks Behaving Badly? Micro-origins of Crisis and Rvival - text of Aristos Doxiadis' lecture for Stavros Niarchos Foundation Lecture, delivered at Yale University (5 December 2011)
