= Katerina Sakellaropoulou =

President of Greece from 2020 to 2025

- Κατερίνα Σακελλαροπούλου
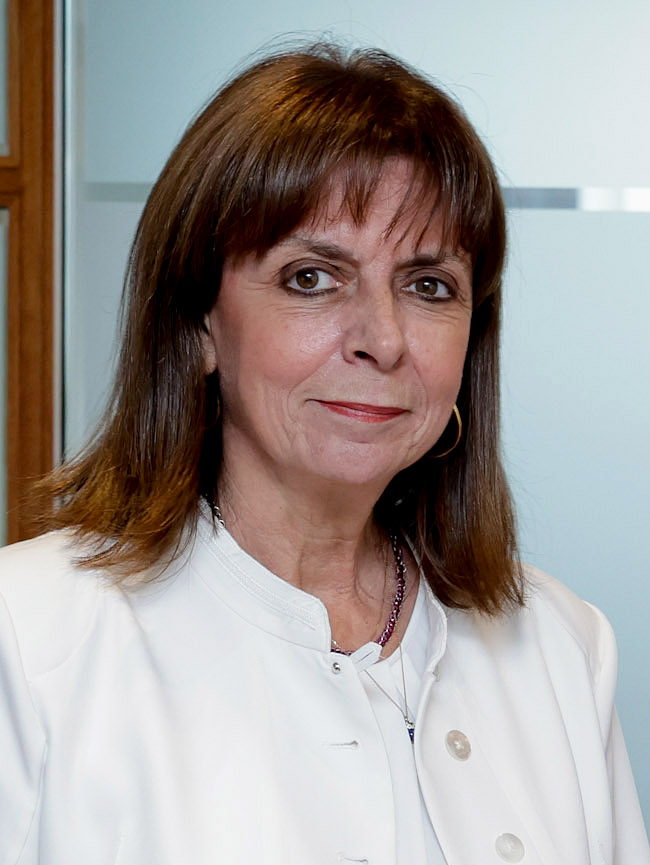
- Sakellaropoulou in 2022

President of Greece
- In office 13 March 2020 – 13 March 2025
- Prime Minister: Kyriakos Mitsotakis; Ioannis Sarmas (caretaker); Kyriakos Mitsotakis
- Preceded by: Prokopis Pavlopoulos
- Succeeded by: Konstantinos Tasoulas

President of the Council of State
- In office 17 October 2018 – 11 February 2020
- Vice President: Athanasios Rantos
- Preceded by: Nikolaos Sakellariou
- Succeeded by: Athanasios Rantos

Vice President of the Council of State
- In office 22 October 2015 – 17 October 2018
- President: Nikolaos Sakellariou
- Preceded by: Nikolaos Sakellariou
- Succeeded by: Athanasios Rantos

Personal details
- Born: Katerina N. Sakellaropoulou; 30 May 1956 (age 70) Thessaloniki, Greece
- Party: Independent (Note: Close to the PASOK party.)
- Domestic partner: Pavlos Kotsonis
- Children: 1
- Education: University of Athens; University of Paris II Panthéon-Assas

Katerina N. Sakellaropoulou (Greek: Κατερίνα Ν. Σακελλαροπούλου [kateˈrina sacelaroˈpulu]; born 30 May 1956) is a Greek retired judge who served as the president of Greece from 2020 to 2025. She was elected by the Hellenic Parliament to succeed Prokopis Pavlopoulos on 22 January 2020. Prior to her election as president, Sakellaropoulou served as president of the Council of State, the highest administrative court of Greece. She was the country's first female president.

== Early life ==
Sakellaropoulou was born in Thessaloniki. Her parents are Nikolaos Sakellaropoulos, a former vice president of the Greek Supreme Court, and Aliki Paraskeva. Her family comes from Stavroupoli, a town in Xanthi prefecture. She studied law at the National and Kapodistrian University of Athens and completed her postgraduate studies in public law at Paris II University. In the mid-1980s, she was admitted to the Council of State and she was promoted to councilor in 2000.

In October 2015 she was appointed vice-president of the Council of State, and in October 2018 she became the first female president of the court, following a unanimous vote. Her election came after the Syriza government, which was in power at the time, considered her progressive record on issues such as the environment and human rights.

She has been a member of the Association of Judiciary Functionaries of the Council of State. During her tenure at the association, she has served as its secretary-general (1985–1986), vice-president (2006–2008), and president (1993–1995, 2000–2001).

She publishes regularly in academic journals. She has also contributed to the book Financial crisis and environmental protection in the case law of the Council of State (Greek: Οικονομική κρίση και προστασία του περιβάλλοντος στη νομολογία του Συμβουλίου της Επικρατείας), Papazisis Publications, 2017.

== President of Greece (2020–2025) ==
On 15 January 2020, the Greek prime minister, Kyriakos Mitsotakis, nominated her for the post of president of the Hellenic Republic. Though she was chosen as a non-partisan candidate, she was an unexpected choice as her progressive politics conflicted with Mitsotakis' centre-right politics. She was elected to the post on 22 January 2020 with 261 MPs voting in favour in the 300-seat Parliament.

Sakellaropoulou took office before the Hellenic Parliament on 13 March of that year in a session with few legislators present, as the country was beginning to be severely affected by the COVID-19 pandemic and the first restrictive measures had been ordered. Upon being sworn in, she became the first woman to serve as Greece's president.

When parliament was unable to form a government in 2023, Sakellaropoulou appointed Ioannis Sarmas, the longest serving chief judge of a Greek high court at the time, as the head of a caretaker government.

Her presidency garnered praise for her historic role as the first female president, but faced heavy criticism for several issues, notably her perceived inaction concerning the violations of rule of law. Her tenure has received some of the lowest levels of popularity in presidential history.

== Political beliefs ==
Sakellaropoulou is a progressive. She has prioritised issues of environmentalism and minority rights. She has described the Russian invasion of Ukraine as "a direct and dramatic conflict of values, between freedom and authoritarianism".

== Personal life ==
Sakellaropoulou lives with her partner, Pavlos Kotsonis, a lawyer. She has one daughter from a previous marriage.

She is an Aris Thessaloniki supporter.

== Honours ==
=== Foreign honours ===
- Cyprus: Grand Collar of the Order of Makarios III (21 September 2020)
- Italy: Knight Grand Cross with Collar of the Order of Merit of the Italian Republic (6 October 2020)
- Egypt: Grand Collar of Order of the Nile (11 November 2020)
- Slovenia: Member of the Order for Exceptional Merits (22 April 2021)
- Portugal: Grand Collar of the Order of Prince Henry (28 March 2022)
- Belgium: Grand Cordon of the Order of Leopold (2 May 2022)
- Slovakia: Grand Cross of the Order of the White Double Cross (6 September 2022)
- Netherlands: Knight Grand Cross of the Order of the Netherlands Lion (31 October 2022)
- Bulgaria: Grand Cross of the Order of the Balkan Mountains (8 December 2022)
- Malta: Honorary Companions of Honour with Collar of the National Order of Merit (5 July 2023)
- Latvia: Commander Grand Cross with Chain of the Order of the Three Stars (2 July 2024)
- SMOM: Collar of the Order pro Merito Melitensi (18 October 2024)

== Notes ==
Legal offices
| Preceded by Nikolaos Sakellariou | Vice President of the Council of State; 2015–2018 | Succeeded by Athanasios Rantos |
| Preceded by Nikolaos Sakellariou | President of the Council of State; 2018–2020 | Succeeded by Athanasios Rantos |
Political offices
| Preceded by Prokopis Pavlopoulos | President of Greece; 2020–2025 | Succeeded by Konstantinos Tasoulas |
