= Ministry of Tourism (Greece) =

Government ministry of Greece

- Υπουργείo Τουρισμού
- Coat of arms of the Hellenic Republic

Agency overview
- Formed: 4 November 2016
- Type: Ministry
- Jurisdiction: Government of Greece
- Headquarters: Vasilissis Amalias Avenue, Athens, Greece; 37.973715°N 23.734994°E
- Minister responsible: Olga Kefalogianni
- Website: mintour.gov.gr

The Ministry of Tourism (Greek: Υπουργείo Τουρισμού) is the government department in charge of tourism in Greece. Established in 1989 and on 11 October 1991, following a proposal by the Prime Minister Konstantinos Mitsotakis, the Ministry of Tourism was abolished and its departments were transferred to the Ministry of National Economy. Βetween 2004 and 2009 had the name Ministry of Touristic Development (Υπουργείο Τουριστικής Ανάπτυξης) and was later merged with the Ministry of Culture and Tourism (Υπουργείο Πολιτισμού και Τουρισμού) in October 2009 but re-established as a separate department in June 2012. It was subsequently subsumed under the Ministry of the Economy, Infrastructure, Shipping and Tourism between January and September 2015 and the restructured Ministry of the Economy, Development and Tourism in September 2015, before being restored as a distinct ministry on 5 November 2016. The main mission of the Ministry of Tourism is the formulation of the tourism policy and the executive planning of the tourist development of the Country in the framework of the government policy, and is also responsible for establishing the institutional framework for the effective protection of tourists/consumers.

== List of ministers ==
=== Touristic development (2004–2009) ===
Name	Took office	Left office	Party
Dimitris Avramopoulos	18 March 2004	15 February 2006	New Democracy
Fani Palli-Petralia	15 February 2006	19 September 2007	New Democracy
Aris Spiliotopoulos	19 September 2007	7 January 2009	New Democracy
Kostas Markopoulos	8 January 2009	7 October 2009	New Democracy

=== Tourism (2012–2015) ===
Name	Took office	Left office	Party
Olga Kefalogianni	21 June 2012	27 January 2015	New Democracy

=== Tourism (alternates, 2015–2016) ===
Name	Took office	Left office	Party
Elena Kountoura	27 January 2015	27 August 2015	Independent Greeks
Alkistis Protopsalti	28 August 2015	21 September 2015	Independent
Elena Kountoura	23 September 2015	5 November 2016	Independent Greeks

=== Tourism (since November 2016) ===
Name	Took office	Left office	Party
Elena Kountoura	5 November 2016	4 May 2019	Independent Greeks (until 2019), Syriza (since 2019)
Thanasis Theocharopoulos	4 May 2019	9 July 2019	Democratic Left (Syriza)
Harry Theoharis	9 July 2019	31 August 2021	New Democracy
Vasilis Kikilias	31 August 2021	25 May 2023	New Democracy
Ioanna Dretra	26 May 2023	26 June 2023	Caretaker, Independent
Olga Kefalogianni	27 June 2023	now	New Democracy

== See also ==
- Cabinet of Greece
- Tourism in Greece
- Greek Tourism Confederation
- Greek National Tourism Organization
