= Ioannis A. Kefalogiannis =

Greek politician and lawyer

Ioannis Kefalogiannis (Greek: Ιωάννης Κεφαλογιάννης; born 18 June 1982) is a Greek lawyer and New Democracy (ND) politician. He was the Minister for the Climate Crisis and Civil Protection from 15 March 2025 to 3 April 2026, in the Second Cabinet of Kyriakos Mitsotakis.

== Education ==
Kefalogiannis studied law at the Law School of Athens and continued with postgraduate studies in politics and international relations at Columbia University in New York, where he received a scholarship from the John Nicholas Foundation. He completed postdoctural studies at Harvard Law School.

== Political career ==
In the 2012 national elections, Ioannis Kefalogiannis was elected as the MP for the constituency of Rethymnon for the first time. He was the youngest Member of the New Democracy Party in this parliament. He was appointed as Secretary to the Hellenic Parliament, and also served as a member of the Standing Committee on Foreign Affairs and Defence of the House. He was a member of the following committees: Standing Committee on National Defense and Foreign Affairs, Standing Committee on Economic Affairs, Committee on Armament Programs and Contracts, Commission permanente spécialisée de la protection de l’environnement. He resigned as climate crisis and civil protection minister on 3 April 2026, after his name appeared in a report on allegations of farm subsidy fraud by the European Public Prosecutor's Office. He denied any wrongdoing.
