= 2021–22 AEK B.C. season =

AEK
2021–22 season
- Chairman: Makis Angelopoulos
- Head coach: Stefanos Dedas (1–17); Curro Segura (18–Playoffs)
- Arena: Ano Liosia Olympic Hall
- Greek League: 6th
- Greek Cup: Semifinals
- Greek Super Cup: 3rd
- Champions League: Group Stage
GBL Home	GBL Away	BCL

The 2021–22 AEK B.C. season is AEK's 65th season in the top-tier level Greek Basket League. AEK competed in four different competitions during the season.

== Transfers 2021–22 ==
=== Players in ===
No.	Pos.	Nat.	Name	Age	Moving from		Type	Ends	Transfer fee	Date	Source
	PG	(Greece)	Dimitris Flionis	24	Aris Thessaloniki	(Greece)		July 1, 2022	Free	August 12, 2021	
	SF	(Greece)	Andreas Petropoulos	27	Ionikos Nikaias	(Greece)		July 1, 2022	Free	August 13, 2021	
	PF	(Greece)	Panagiotis Filippakos	27	Panerythraikos	(Greece)		July 1, 2022	Free	August 13, 2021	
	C	(Greece)	Georgios Bogris	32	Lenovo Tenerife	(Spain)		July 1, 2022	Free	August 15, 2021	
	SG	(Greece)	Nikos Pappas	31	Zielona Góra	(Poland)		July 1, 2022	Free	August 16, 2021	
	PG	(Spain)	Quino Colom	32	Saski Baskonia	(Spain)		July 1, 2022	Free	August 20, 2021	
	SF	(Argentina)	Juan Pablo Vaulet	25	Manresa	(Spain)		July 1, 2023	Free	August 21, 2021	
	PF	(Serbia)	Stevan Jelovac	32	San-en NeoPhoenix	(Japan)		July 1, 2022	Free	August 23, 2021	
	PF	(United States)	Eric Griffin	31	Hapoel Be'er Sheva	(Israel)		July 1, 2023	Free	August 23, 2021	
	SG	(Colombia)	Braian Angola	27	Ironi Nes Ziona	(Israel)		July 1, 2023	Free	August 24, 2021	
	SG	(United States)	Manny Harris	31	Shandong Heroes	(China)		July 1, 2022	Free	August 25, 2021	
	PF	(United States)	Ian Hummer	31	Petkim Spor	(Turkey)		July 1, 2022	Free	October 7, 2021	
	PG	(Greece)	Antonis Koniaris	24	Ionikos Nikaias	(Greece)		July 1, 2024	Free	December 30, 2021	
	PF	(Greece)	Ioannis Kouzeloglou	26	Iraklis Thessaloniki	(Greece)		July 1, 2022	Free	December 31, 2021	
	SG	(Canada)	Andy Rautins	35	Free agent			July 1, 2022		January 13, 2022	
	SG	(United States)	Keith Langford	38	Free agent			July 1, 2022		February 14, 2022	
	SG	(Greece)	Chris Vogiatzis	17	Free agent			July 1, 2022		September 8, 2023	

=== Players out ===
No.	Pos.	Nat.	Name	Age	Moving to		Type	Transfer fee	Date	Source
	PG	(Greece)	Nikos Zisis	38	Retirement				June 28, 2021	
	PG	(Greece)	Vassilis Toliopoulos	25	PAOK	(Greece)		Free	June 29, 2021	
	SG	(United States)	Keith Langford	37	Free agent				July 1, 2021	
	C	(United States)	Marcus Slaughter	36	Free agent				July 1, 2021	
	SF	(Lithuania)	Jonas Mačiulis	36	Retirement				July 1, 2021	
	SF	(Belgium)	Matt Lojeski	35	Free agent				July 1, 2021	
	PF	(Nigeria)	Moses Kingsley	26	Ionikos Nikaias	(Greece)			July 1, 2021	
	SG	(United States)	Daryl Macon	25	Panathinaikos	(Greece)		Free	July 11, 2021	
	SF	(Greece)	Vlado Janković	31	PAOK	(Greece)		Free	July 23, 2021	
	PG	(Greece)	Dimitrios Katsivelis	29	Peristeri	(Greece)		Free	July 23, 2021	
	PG	(Greece)	Dimitrios Moraitis	22	Peristeri	(Greece)		Free	July 23, 2021	
	C	(Angola)	Yanick Moreira	30	Peristeri	(Greece)		Free	July 28, 2021	
	SF	(Greece)	Nikos Rogkavopoulos	20	Promitheas Patras	(Greece)		Free	July 28, 2021	
	PG	(Greece)	Nikos Gkikas	30	Promitheas Patras	(Greece)		Free	August 6, 2021	
	PF	(Greece)	Linos Chrysikopoulos	28	Peristeri	(Greece)		Free	August 9, 2021	
	C	(Greece)	Costis Gontikas	27	Ionikos Nikaias	(Greece)		Free	August 16, 2021	
	SG	(United States)	Manny Harris	31	Kaohsiung Steelers	(Taiwan)			October 2, 2021	
	PF	(Serbia)	Stevan Jelovac	32	Passed away				December 5, 2021	
	SF	(Argentina)	Juan Pablo Vaulet	25	Manresa	(Spain)		Free	December 20, 2021	
	C	(Greece)	Georgios Bogris	32	Apollon Patras	(Greece)		Free	February 10, 2022	
	SG	(United States)	Keith Langford	38	Free agent				May 24, 2022	

== Friendlies ==
Win Loss Draw

29 August 2021 1	AEK (Greece)	102–81	(United Kingdom) London Lions	Athens
18:00 (EET)
		Boxscore		Arena: Ano Liosia Hall

3 September 2021 2	AEK (Greece)	96–81	(Greece) Iraklis	Athens
17:15 (EET)
				Arena: Ano Liosia Hall

8 September 2021 3	Bahçeşehir (Turkey)	80–79	(Greece) AEK	Istanbul
14:00 (EET)
		Boxscore		Arena: Ülker Arena

10 September 2021 4	Darüşşafaka (Turkey)	119–114	(Greece) AEK	Istanbul
19:15 (EET)
		Boxscore		Arena: Volkswagen Arena

30 April 2022 5	Maroussi (Greece)	vs.	(Greece) AEK	Athens
00:00 (EET)
				Arena: Saint Thomas Hall

18 May 2022 6	Panathinaikos (Greece)	vs.	(Greece) AEK	Athens
19:00 (EET)
				Arena: O.A.C.A. Olympic Indoor Hall

== Competitions ==
=== Overall ===
Competition	Started round	Current position / round	Final position / round	First match	Last match
Greek League	Matchday 1	—	6th	3 October 2021	25 May 2022
Greek Cup	Round of 16	—	Semifinals	26 December 2021	18 February 2022
Greek Super Cup	Final-4	—	3rd	25 September 2021	26 September 2021
Champions League	Group Stage	—	Group Stage	6 October 2021	22 December 2021

Updated to match played May 25, 2022
Source: GBL Games & Results, BCL Games & Results

=== Overview ===
Competition	Record							
Competition	Pld	W	D	L	PF	PA	PD	Win %
Greek League	26	13	0	13	1,986	2,097	−111	50.00
Greek Cup	2	1	0	1	160	153	+7	50.00
Greek Super Cup	2	1	0	1	157	155	+2	50.00
Champions League	6	1	0	5	471	516	−45	16.67
Total	36	16	0	20	2,774	2,921	−147	44.44

Last updated: May 25, 2022
Source: GBL Games & Results, BCL Games & Results

=== Greek League ===
==== Results summary ====
Overall						Home					Away				
Pld	W	L	PF	PA	PD	W	L	PF	PA	PD	W	L	PF	PA	PD
24	13	11	1827	1925	−98	9	3	940	895	+45	4	8	887	1030	−143

Last updated: May 14, 2022.
Source: GBL Rankings

==== Results by round ====
Round	1	2	3	4	5	6	7	8	9	10	11	12	13	14	15	16	17	18	19	20	21	22	23	24
Ground	A	H	A	H	A	H	A	A	H	A	A	H	H	A	A	H	A	H	A	H	A	H	H	A
Result	L	W	L	W	W	L	L	W	W	L	L	W	L	L	W	L	W	W	L	W	W	W	W	L
Position	12	7	8	7	5	6	8	6	5	6	5	5	7	8	7	8	6	5	6	6	5	5	4	4

Updated to match(es) played on May 14, 2022. Source: GBL Fixtures
A = Away; H = Home; W = Win; D = Draw; L = Loss

==== Regular season ====
Win Loss

3 October 2021 1	Olympiacos	103–78	AEK	Piraeus
16:15 (EET)
		Boxscore		Arena: Peace and Friendship Stadium

9 October 2021 2	AEK	81–69	Larisa	Athens
20:00 (EET)
		Boxscore		Arena: Ano Liosia Olympic Hall

16 October 2021 3	Apollon Patras OSCAR	84–68	AEK	Patras
17:00 (EET)
		Boxscore		Arena: Apollon Patras Indoor Hall

23 October 2021 4	AEK	64–63	Aris	Athens
20:00 (EET)
		Boxscore		Arena: Ano Liosia Olympic Hall

30 October 2021 5	Ionikos HNC REVOLUTION	59–65	AEK	Piraeus
20:00 (EET)
		Boxscore		Arena: Nikaias Platonas Indoor Hall

6 November 2021 6	AEK	82–85	Kolossos H Hotels	Athens
17:00 (EET)
		Boxscore		Arena: Ano Liosia Olympic Hall

13 November 2021 7	Panathinaikos OPAP	100–75	AEK	Athens
20:00 (EET)
		Boxscore		Arena: O.A.C.A. Olympic Indoor Hall

20 November 2021 8	Lavrio	81–82	AEK	Lavrio
20:00 (EET)
		Boxscore		Arena: Lavrio Indoor Hall

4 December 2021 9	AEK	81–77	Promitheas Patras	Athens
20:00 (EET)
		Boxscore		Arena: Ano Liosia Olympic Hall

11 December 2021 10	Iraklis	86–74	AEK	Thessaloniki
17:00 (EET)
		Boxscore		Arena: Ivanofeio Sports Arena

16 January 2022 11	Peristeri VITABIOTICS	101–81	AEK	Athens
20:00 (EET)
		Boxscore		Arena: Peristeri Indoor Hall

21 January 2022 12	AEK	72–67	PAOK MATECO	Athens
20:00 (EET)
		Boxscore		Arena: Ano Liosia Olympic Hall

29 January 2022 13	AEK	74–80	Olympiacos	Athens
21:00 (EET)
		Boxscore		Arena: Ano Liosia Olympic Hall

12 February 2022 14	Larisa	82–65	AEK	Larisa
21:00 (EET)
		Boxscore		Arena: Larissa Neapolis Indoor Arena

6 March 2022 15	AEK	77–75	Apollon Patras OSCAR	Athens
20:00 (EET)
		Boxscore		Arena: Ano Liosia Olympic Hall

13 March 2022 16	Aris	91–73	AEK	Thessaloniki
18:00 (EET)
		Boxscore		Arena: Alexandreio Melathron

19 March 2022 17	AEK	92–75	Ionikos HNC REVOLUTION	Athens
20:00 (EET)
		Boxscore		Arena: Ano Liosia Olympic Hall

27 March 2022 18	Kolossos H Hotels	62–65	AEK	Rhodes
17:00 (EET)
		Boxscore		Arena: Kallithea Palais des Sports

3 April 2022 19	AEK	69–83	Panathinaikos OPAP	Athens
17:00 (EET)
		Boxscore		Arena: Ano Liosia Olympic Hall

10 April 2022 20	AEK	90–75	Lavrio	Athens
20:00 (EET)
		Boxscore		Arena: Ano Liosia Olympic Hall

17 April 2022 21	Promitheas Patras	85–89	AEK	Patras
20:00 (EET)
		Boxscore		Arena: Dimitris Tofalos Arena

20 April 2022 22	AEK	80–74	Iraklis	Athens
17:00 (EET)
		Boxscore		Arena: Ano Liosia Olympic Hall

7 May 2022 23	AEK	78–72	Peristeri VITABIOTICS	Athens
17:00 (EET)
		Boxscore		Arena: Ano Liosia Olympic Hall

14 May 2022 24	PAOK MATECO	96–72	AEK	Thessaloniki
17:00 (EET)
		Boxscore		Arena: P.A.O.K. Sports Arena

==== Results overview ====
Win Loss Draw

Opposition	Home score	Away score	Double
Aris	64–63	91–73	137–154
Apollon Patras OSCAR	77–75	84–68	145–159
Olympiacos	74–80	103–78	152–183
Kolossos H Hotels	82–85	62–65	147–147
Peristeri VITABIOTICS	78–72	101–81	159–173
Larisa	81–69	82–65	146–151
Lavrio Aegean Cargo	90–75	81–82	172–156
Ionikos HNC REVOLUTION	92–75	59–65	157–134
Panathinaikos OPAP	69–83	100–75	144–183
PAOK MATECO	72–67	96–72	144–163
Promitheas Patras	81–77	85–89	170–162
Iraklis	80–74	86–74	154–160

==== Quarterfinals ====
Win Loss

23 May 2022 1st Round	AEK	82–95	Promitheas Patras	Athens
20:00 (EET)
		Boxscore		Arena: Ano Liosia Olympic Hall

25 May 2022 2nd Round	Promitheas Patras	77–75	AEK	Patras
17:00 (EET)
		Boxscore		Arena: Dimitris Tofalos Arena

=== Greek Cup ===
Win Loss

Quarterfinals

26 December 2021 Quarterfinal	AEK	90–77	Peristeri VITABIOTICS	Athens
20:00 (EET)
		Boxscore

Final-4

18 February 2022 Semifinal	Olympiacos	76–70	AEK	Crete
20:00 (EET)
		Boxscore		Arena: Heraklion Indoor Arena

=== Greek Super Cup ===
Win Loss

Final-4

25 September 2021 Semifinal	Promitheas	88–71	AEK	Patra
21:00 (EET)
		Boxscore		Arena: Dimitris Tofalos Arena

Final-4

26 September 2021 Consolation final	Lavrio	67–86	AEK	Patra
20:30 (EET)
		Boxscore		Arena: Dimitris Tofalos Arena

=== Group D ===
Pos	Team	Pld	W	L	PF	PA	PD	Pts	Qualification	FAL	TVS	VEF	AEK
1	(Hungary) Falco Szombathely	6	5	1	461	442	+19	11	Advance to round of 16	—	81–80	68–59	83–78
2	(Italy) NutriBullet Treviso	6	4	2	483	446	+37	10	Advance to play-ins	68–60	—	91–85	81–69
3	(Latvia) VEF Rīga	6	2	4	463	474	−11	8	Advance to play-ins	74–80	74–71	—	92–76
4	(Greece) AEK	6	1	5	471	516	−45	7		83–89	77–92	88–79	—

Source: Groups Standings
Legend: Blue = home team win; Red = away team win.

==== Results summary ====
Overall						Home					Away				
Pld	W	L	PF	PA	PD	W	L	PF	PA	PD	W	L	PF	PA	PD
6	1	5	471	516	−45	1	2	248	260	−12	0	3	223	256	−33

Last updated: December 22, 2021.
Source: BCL Group D Results

==== Results by round ====
Round	1	2	3	4	5	6
Ground	A	H	A	H	H	A
Result	L	L	L	W	L	L
Position	3	4	4	4	4	4

Updated to match(es) played on December 22, 2021. Source: BCL Group D Fixtures
A = Away; H = Home; W = Win; D = Draw; L = Loss

==== Regular season ====
Win Loss

6 October 2021 1	Falco Szombathely (Hungary)	83–78	(Greece) AEK Athens	Szombathely
19:00 (EET)
		Boxscore		Arena: Arena Savaria

19 October 2021 2	AEK Athens (Greece)	77–92	(Italy) NutriBullet Treviso	Athens
19:30 (EET)
		Boxscore		Arena: Nikos Galis Olympic Indoor Hall

3 November 2021 3	VEF Rīga (Latvia)	92–76	(Greece) AEK Athens	Riga
19:00 (EET)
		Boxscore		Arena: Arena Riga

15 November 2021 4	AEK Athens (Greece)	88–79	(Latvia) VEF Rīga	Athens
00:00 (EET)
		Boxscore		Arena: Nikos Galis Olympic Indoor Hall

14 December 2021 5	AEK Athens (Greece)	83–89	(Hungary) Falco Szombathely	Athens
20:30 (EET)
		Boxscore		Arena: Nikos Galis Olympic Indoor Hall

22 December 2021 6	NutriBullet Treviso (Italy)	81–69	(Greece) AEK Athens	Treviso
21:00 (EET)
		Boxscore		Arena: Palaverde

==== Results overview ====
Win Loss

Opposition	Home score	Away score	Double
(Hungary) Falco Szombathely	83–89	83–78	161–172
(Latvia) VEF Rīga	88–79	92–76	164–171
(Italy) NutriBullet Treviso	77–92	81–69	146–173
