= 2017–18 Greek Basket League =

Greek Basket League
- Season: 2017–18
- Duration: 7 October 2017 – 12 May 2018 (regular season); 16 May 2018 – 17 June 2018 (playoffs)
- Games played: 182 (regular season); 22 (playoffs)
- Teams: 14
- TV partners: ERT; Cosmote Sport

Regular season
- Season MVP: (Greece) Nick Calathes
- Relegated: Koroivos; Trikala Aries

Finals
- Champions: Panathinaikos Superfoods (36th title)
- Runners-up: Olympiacos
- Third place: PAOK
- Fourth place: Promitheas Patras
- Finals MVP: (United States) Mike James

Statistical leaders
Points	(United States) Stefan Moody	391
Rebounds	(United States) Shaquille Goodwin	187
Assists	(Greece) Nick Calathes	182
Index Rating	(United States) McKenzie Moore	548

The 2017–18 Basket League season was the 26th season of the top-tier Greek professional basketball league, since its establishment in 1992, and the 78th season of top-flight Greek basketball overall. The season started on October 7, 2017, and ended on June 17, 2018.

== Teams ==
=== Promotion and relegation ===
Apollon Patras, and Doxa Lefkadas were relegated after the 2016–17 Greek Basket League. Panionios and Gymnastikos Larissas Faros were promoted from the 2016–17 Greek A2 Basket League.

2017–18 Greek Basket League season club locations.

=== Locations and arenas ===
Club	City	Arena	Capacity	App.
AEK	Athens (Marousi)	OAKA Indoor Hall	19,250	61
Aris	Thessaloniki	Alexandrio Melathron	5,138	64
Gymnastikos Larissas Faros	Larissa	Larissa Neapolis Indoor Arena	4,000	13
Kolossos	Rhodes City	Venetoklio Indoor Hall	1,242	12
Koroivos	Amaliada	Amaliada Indoor Hall	2,000	4
Kymis	Kymi	Tasos Kampouris Kanithou Indoor Hall	1,620	2
Lavrio Megabolt	Lavrio	Lavrio Indoor Hall	1,700	3
Olympiacos	Athens (Piraeus)	Peace and Friendship Stadium	12,000	65
Panathinaikos Superfoods	Athens (Marousi)	OAKA Indoor Hall	19,250	68
Panionios	Athens (Nea Smyrni)	Nea Smyrni Indoor Hall	1,832	49
PAOK	Thessaloniki (Pylaia)	PAOK Sports Arena	8,500	61
Promitheas Patras	Patras	Dimitris Tofalos Arena	4,200	2
Rethymno Cretan Kings	Rethymno	Rethymno Indoor Hall	1,600	8
Trikala Aries	Trikala	Trikala Indoor Hall	2,500	5

=== Personnel and kits ===
Team	Head coach	Team captain	Kit manufacturer	Shirt sponsor
AEK	(Serbia) / (Greece) Dragan Šakota	(Greece) Dušan Šakota	Fila	OPAP
Aris	(Greece) Panagiotis Giannakis	(Greece) Spyros Mourtos	CAP	
Gymnastikos Larissas Faros	(Greece) Thanasis Skourtopoulos	(Greece) Ioannis Vavatsikos		
Kolossos	(Greece) Aris Lykogiannis	(Greece) Ioannis Georgalis	Fila	Aegean Airlines
Koroivos	(Greece) Dinos Kalampakos	(Greece) Giannis Sachpatzidis	Nickan	Loux
Kymis	(Greece) Ioannis Kastritis	(Greece) Sotirios Manolopoulos	Erreà	Seajets
Lavrio Megabolt	(Greece) Christos Serelis	(Greece) Sakis Giannakopoulos	Nickan	Naprosyn
Olympiacos	(Greece) Ioannis Sfairopoulos	(Greece) Vassilis Spanoulis	Nike	OPAP
Panathinaikos Superfoods	(Spain) Xavi Pascual	(Greece) Ian Vougioukas	Adidas	OPAP
Panionios	(Greece) Vangelis Ziagkos	(Greece) Nikos Michalos	Nickan	Vikos Cola
PAOK	(Greece) Ilias Papatheodorou	(Greece) Vangelis Margaritis	Athlos	OPAP
Promitheas Patras	(Greece) Makis Giatras	(Greece) Nikos Gkikas	Spalding	Loux
Rethymno Cretan Kings	(Greece) Nikos Vetoulas	(Greece) Charis Giannopoulos	Nickan	OPAP
Trikala Aries	(Greece) Fotis Takianos	(Greece) Diamantis Slaftsakis	CAP	Olympos

== Regular season ==
=== League table ===
Pos	Team	Pld	W	L	PF	PA	PD	Pts	Qualification or relegation
1	Panathinaikos Superfoods	26	26	0	2404	1777	+627	52	Advanced to playoffs
2	Olympiacos	26	22	4	2245	1781	+464	48	Advanced to playoffs
3	Promitheas Patras	26	17	9	2081	2013	+68	43	Advanced to playoffs
4	PAOK	26	17	9	2063	1975	+88	43	Advanced to playoffs
5	AEK	26	15	11	2082	2031	+51	41	Advanced to playoffs
6	Lavrio Megabolt	26	14	12	2149	2110	+39	40	Advanced to playoffs
7	Kymis	26	14	12	2026	2032	−6	40	Advanced to playoffs
8	Kolossos H Hotels	26	11	15	1934	1977	−43	37	Advanced to playoffs
9	Aris	26	10	16	1754	1869	−115	36	
10	Rethymno Cretan Kings	26	10	16	2047	2136	−89	36	
11	Gymnastikos Larissas Faros	26	8	18	1927	2190	−263	34	
12	Panionios	26	7	19	1876	2078	−202	33	
13	Koroivos (R)	26	7	19	1824	2082	−258	33	Relegated to Greek A2 League
14	Trikala Aries (R)	26	4	22	1802	2163	−361	30	Relegated to Greek A2 League

Source: ESAKE
(R) Relegated

=== Results ===
Home \ Away	AEK	ARIS	GSL	KOL	KOR	KYM	LAV	OLY	PAO	PAN	PAOK	PRO	RCK	TRI
AEK	—	73–64	106–79	95–79	86–60	82–76	96–86	66–62	74–94	83–73	72–81	75–76	81–74	91–78
Aris	64–62	—	71–60	72–86	66–68	60–73	80–69	55–80	70–88	60–48	65–66	68–64	70–52	82–63
Gymnastikos Larissas Faros	75–86	81–76	—	79–77	82–78	80–91	80–87	83–95	52–89	98–68	101–89	81–89	70–89	77–70
Kolossos H Hotels	82–78	73–67	94–74	—	86–71	68–81	71–77	54–72	71–72	70–62	76–79	70–89	64–63	78–60
Koroivos	75–77	71–55	73–55	79–76	—	59–73	67–91	54–104	49–86	68–67	87–91	78–71	102–97	82–85
Kymis	77–79	94–69	70–71	93–89	62–60	—	94–81	56–85	73–90	95–83	88–85	68–73	82–76	72–63
Lavrio Megabolt	80–72	70–71	77–55	80–62	80–69	78–65	—	68–84	57–111	83–73	90–72	101–87	78–77	117–87
Olympiacos	100–86	86–66	100–69	83–72	97–76	93–78	91–62	—	68–71	87–65	96–77	104–69	90–72	86–51
Panathinaikos Superfoods	115–85	84–63	103–70	87–63	92–57	87–64	120–118	68–61	—	97–53	89–74	96–64	91–69	87–56
Panionios	71–69	81–87	74–66	70–90	70–59	91–92	72–71	73–79	66–89	—	67–81	80–87	96–64	82–76
PAOK	86–65	63–57	91–51	70–56	92–63	94–83	92–87	78–71	74–91	92–74	—	73–79	80–72	58–54
Promitheas Patras	69–66	70–40	91–80	76–80	75–70	93–82	98–87	73–87	91–108	69–58	81–68	—	94–72	88–71
Rethymno Cretan Kings	90–95	80–73	91–84	89–61	95–90	83–73	73–95	66–86	69–103	90–78	73–79	82–78	—	103–67
Trikala Aries	71–82	64–83	65–74	59–86	71–59	60–71	91–79	73–98	66–96	76–81	87–78	68–87	76–86	—

Updated to match(es) played on 15 April 2018. Source: ESAKE
Legend: Blue = home team win; Red = away team win.
Matches with lighter background shading were decided after overtime.

== Playoffs ==
The eight highest ranked teams in the regular season qualified for the playoffs.

Teams in bold won the playoff series. Numbers to the left of each team indicate the team's original playoff seeding. Numbers to the right indicate the score of each playoff game.

=== Bracket ===
Quarterfinals
1	**Panathiniakos Superfoods**	**2**
8	Kolossos Rodou	0
4	**PAOK**	**2**
5	AEK	0
2	**Olympiacos**	**2**
7	Kymis	0
3	**Promitheas Patras**	**2**
6	Lavrio Megabolt	0

Semifinals
1	**Panathinaikos Superfoods**	3
4	PAOK	0
2	**Olympiacos**	3
3	Promitheas Patras	0

Finals
1	**Panathinaikos Superfoods**	3
2	Olympiacos	2
Third-place series
3	Promitheas Patras	0
4	**PAOK**	3

=== Quarterfinals ===
The higher-seeded team played the first and third leg (if necessary) at home. The first legs were played on 16 May, while the second legs were played on 19 May 2018.

Team 1	Series	Team 2	Game 1	Game 2	Game 3
**Panathinaikos Superfoods**	2–0	Kolossos Rodou	96–65	87–69	
**PAOK**	2–0	AEK	78–74	93–88	
**Olympiacos**	2–0	Kymis	78–75	88–67	
**Promitheas Patras**	2–0	Lavrio Megabolt	75–70	79–77	

=== Semifinals ===
The higher-seeded team played the first, second and fifth leg (if necessary) at home. The first legs were played on 24 May, while the second legs were played on 26 May 2018.

Team 1	Series	Team 2	Game 1	Game 2	Game 3	Game 4	Game 5
**Panathinaikos Superfoods**	3–0	PAOK	92–79	84–67	88–72		
**Olympiacos**	3–0	Promitheas Patras	108–71	89–88	89–56		

=== Finals ===
Team 1	Series	Team 2	Game 1	Game 2	Game 3	Game 4	Game 5
**Panathinaikos Superfoods**	3–2	Olympiacos	65–75	71–66	73–58	76–92	84–70

==== Third-place series ====
Team 1	Series	Team 2	Game 1	Game 2	Game 3	Game 4	Game 5
Promitheas Patras	0–3	**PAOK**	79–81	61–100	79–91		

== Final standings ==
Pos	Team	Pld	W	L	Qualification or Relegation
1	Panathinaikos	36	34	2	Qualification to the EuroLeague; *Club qualified for EuroLeague by having a contract
2	Olympiacos	36	29	7	Qualification to the EuroLeague; *Club qualified for EuroLeague by having a contract
3	PAOK	34	22	12	Qualification to the Champions League regular season *PAOK, Promitheas Patras, and AEK declined EuroCup participation.
4	Promitheas Patras	34	19	15	Qualification to the Champions League regular season *PAOK, Promitheas Patras, and AEK declined EuroCup participation.
5	AEK	28	15	13	Qualification to the Champions League regular season *PAOK, Promitheas Patras, and AEK declined EuroCup participation.
6	Lavrio	28	14	14	Qualification to the FIBA Europe Cup qualification round.
7	Kymis Seajets	28	14	14	
8	Kolossos Rodou	28	11	17	
9	Aris	26	10	16	Qualification to the Champions League qualification round, as wild card.
10	Rethymno Cretan Kings	26	10	16	
11	Gymnastikos Larissas Faros	26	8	18	
12	Panionios	26	7	19	
13	Koroivos	26	7	19	Relegation to the Greek A2 League
14	Trikala Aries	26	4	22	Relegation to the Greek A2 League

== Awards ==
All official awards of the 2017–18 Greek Basket League.

=== Greek League MVP ===
Player	Team
(Greece) Nick Calathes	Panathinaikos

=== Greek League Finals MVP ===
Player	Team
(United States) Mike James	Panathinaikos

=== All-Greek League Team ===
Pos.	Player	Team
G	(Greece) Nick Calathes	Panathinaikos
G	(United States) Thad McFadden	Kymis
F	(United States) McKenzie Moore	Lavrio
F	(United States) Chris Singleton	Panathinaikos
C	(Serbia) Nikola Milutinov	Olympiacos

=== Best Coach ===
Player	Team
(Spain) Xavi Pascual	Panathinaikos

=== Defensive Player of the Year ===
Player	Team
(Greece) Nick Calathes	Panathinaikos

=== Best Young Player ===
Player	Team
(Greece) Antonis Koniaris	PAOK

=== Most Improved Player ===
Player	Team
(Greece) Christos Saloustros	Promitheas Patras

=== Most Popular Player ===
Player	Team
(Greece) Nick Calathes	Panathinaikos

=== Most Spectacular Player ===
Player	Team
(Greece) Thanasis Antetokounmpo	Panathinaikos

== Statistical leaders ==
The Greek Basket League counts official stats leaders by stats totals, and not by per game averages. It also counts the total stats for both regular season combined.

=== Performance index rating ===
Pos	Player	Club	PIR
1	(United States) McKenzie Moore	Lavrio	548
2	(United States) Shaquille Goodwin	Rethymno	389
3	(Greece) Nick Calathes	Panathinaikos	377
4	(United States) Ronald Saftennar	Gymnastikos Larissas	371
5	(United States) Stefan Moody	Rethymno	366

=== Points ===
Pos	Player	Club	Total Points
1	(United States) Stefan Moody	Rethymno	391
2	(United States) McKenzie Moore	Lavrio	386
3	(United States) Thad McFadden	Kymis	354
4	(United States) Quenton DeCosey	Koroivos	338
5	(United States) Jahii Carson	Koroivos	337

=== Rebounds ===
Pos	Player	Club	Total Rebounds
1	(United States) Shaquille Goodwin	Rethymno	187
2	(United States) Gary McGhee	Kymis	172
3	(France) Boris Dallo	Panionios	161
4	(United States) Lenzelle Smith Jr.	Kymis	148
5	(United States) Quenton DeCosey	Koroivos	142

=== Assists ===
Pos	Player	Club	Total Assists
1	(Greece) Nick Calathes	Panathinaikos	182
2	(Greece) Nikos Gkikas	Promitheas Patras	162
3	(Greece) Nondas Papantoniou	Gymnastikos Larissas	117
4	(United States) Mike Green	AEK	116
5	(United States) McKenzie Moore	Lavrio	113

== Clubs in European-wide competitions ==
Team	Competition	Result
Olympiacos	EuroLeague	Playoffs
Panathinaikos	EuroLeague	Playoffs, Quarterfinals
AEK	FIBA Champions League	Final-4, 1st place
PAOK	FIBA Champions League	Playoffs, Round of 16
Aris	FIBA Champions League	Regular season, 8th place

== See also ==
- 2017–18 Greek Basketball Cup
- 2017–18 Greek A2 Basket League (2nd tier)
