= 2021–22 Greek Basket League =

82nd season of the Greek Basket League

Basket League
- Season: 2021–22
- Games played: 175
- Teams: 13

Regular season
- Season MVP: (Bulgaria) Sasha Vezenkov
- Relegated: Iraklis

Finals
- Champions: Olympiacos (13th title)
- Runners-up: Panathinaikos
- Finals MVP: (Bulgaria) Sasha Vezenkov

Statistical leaders
Points	(United States) Anthony Cowan Jr.	359
Rebounds	(United States) Ousman Krubally	203
Assists	(Greece) Vassilis Mouratos	152
Index Rating	(Bulgaria) Sasha Vezenkov	427

The 2021–22 Basket League season was the 30th season of the top-tier Greek professional basketball league, since its establishment in 1992, and the 82nd season of top-flight Greek basketball overall.

== Teams ==
=== Promotion and relegation (pre-season) ===
Relegated from the 2020-21 Basket League

Messolonghi

Promoted from the 2020-21 A2 League

Apollon
Olympiacos

=== Locations and arenas ===
Locations of the 2021–22 Basket League teams

Club	Location	Arena	Capacity
AEK	Athens (Ano Liosia)	Ano Liosia Olympic Hall	9,327
Apollon	Patras	Apollon Patras Indoor Hall	3,500
Aris	Thessaloniki	Alexandrio Melathron	5,138
Ionikos	Piraeus (Nikaia)	Platon Indoor Hall	1,206
Iraklis	Thessaloniki	Ivanofeio Sports Arena	2,500
Kolossos	Rhodes	Kallithea Palais des Sports	1,400
Larisa	Larissa	Neapolis Indoor Arena	4,000
Lavrio	Lavrio	Lavrio Indoor Hall	1,700
Olympiacos	Piraeus	Peace and Friendship Stadium	11,319
Panathinaikos	Athens (Marousi)	OAKA Indoor Hall	19,443
PAOK	Thessaloniki (Pylaia)	PAOK Sports Arena	8,500
Peristeri	Athens (Peristeri)	Peristeri Arena	4,000
Promitheas	Patras	Dimitris Tofalos Arena	4,150

== Regular season ==
=== League table ===
Pos	Team	Pld	W	L	PF	PA	PD	Pts	Qualification or relegation
1	Olympiacos	24	23	1	2223	1743	+480	47	Advanced to playoffs
2	Panathinaikos OPAP	24	22	2	2003	1644	+359	46	Advanced to playoffs
3	Kolossos H Hotels	24	15	9	1801	1771	+30	39	Advanced to playoffs
4	AEK Athens	24	13	11	1827	1925	−98	37	Advanced to playoffs
5	Promitheas Patras	24	12	12	1857	1878	−21	36	Advanced to playoffs
6	Larisa	24	12	12	1856	1953	−97	36	Advanced to playoffs
7	Aris Thessaloniki	24	11	13	1832	1853	−21	35	Advanced to playoffs
8	Peristeri bwin	24	10	14	1808	1862	−54	34	Advanced to playoffs
9	PAOK mateco	24	10	14	1829	1818	+11	34	
10	Lavrio Megabolt	24	8	16	1773	1928	−155	32	
11	Apollon Patras	24	8	16	1748	1913	−165	32	
12	Ionikos	24	6	18	1835	1988	−153	30	
13	Iraklis	24	6	18	1795	1911	−116	27 (Note: Iraklis were deducted 3 points by HEBA)	Relegated to Greek A2 Basket League

Updated to match(es) played on 14 May 2022. Source: ESAKE

=== Results ===
Home \ Away	AEK	APO	ARIS	ION	IRA	KOL	LAR	LAV	OLY	PAN	PAOK	PER	PRO
AEK	—	77–75	64–63	92–75	80–74	82–85	81–69	90–75	74–80	69–83	72–67	78–72	81–77
Apollon	84–68	—	74–73	80–72	89–95	76–80	74–82	72–62	68–94	48–90	95–91	74–72	59–71
Aris Thessaloniki	91–73	70–56	—	79–75	68–78	81–85	82–70	69–73	76–87	81–71	77–76	87–68	76–73
Ionikos	59–65	82–96	93–83	—	74–62	86–84	84–89	84–91	78–86	61–68	66–69	82–87	65–88
Iraklis	86–74	81–82	91–86	89–84	—	62–64	85–90	83–67	90–96	59–81	73–84	76–79	82–95
Kolossos	62–65	73–56	77–64	88–81	76–59	—	93–75	82–59	69–87	64–88	69–60	74–65	68–61
Larisa	82–65	83–74	84–81	86–84	55–70	81–77	—	66–75	70–101	86–90	74–70	63–78	84–77
Lavrio	81–82	82–66	68–64	59–61	84–71	81–84	77–91	—	72–108	82–91	59–61	52–75	90–82
Olympiacos	103–78	98–78	89–67	109–65	94–65	93–74	93–84	101–58	—	76–81	86–68	104–85	108–75
Panathinaikos	100–75	78–68	103–83	92–78	70–58	77–54	98–67	102–83	62–68	—	77–67	75–57	92–67
PAOK	96–72	81–76	96–64	79–80	72–69	86–80	82–71	73–89	73–84	64–81	—	86–87	84–65
Peristeri	101–81	78–68	67–70	79–82	71–68	70–78	71–77	91–80	67–93	62–77	68–67	—	81–88
Promitheas	85–89	80–60	62–82	88–84	78–69	76–61	91–77	79–71	66–85	67–76	84–77	82–77	—

Legend: Blue = home team win; Red = away team win.
Matches with lighter background shading were decided after overtime.

== Playoffs ==
The eight highest ranked teams in the regular season qualify for the playoffs. Quarterfinals are being played in a "best of 3" format, while the rest of the series are being played in a "best of 5" format.

=== Bracket ===
Quarter-finals
Olympiacos	2
Peristeri	0
AEK	0
Promitheas	2
Panathinaikos	2
Aris	0
Kolossos	0
Larisa	2

Semi-finals
Olympiacos	3
Promitheas	0
Panathinaikos	3
Larisa	2

Final
Olympiacos	3
Panathinaikos	0
Third place
Promitheas	3
Larisa	2

=== Quarterfinals ===
Team 1	Series	Team 2	Game 1	Game 2	Game 3
Olympiacos	2–0	Peristeri	79–67	92–57	
AEK	0–2	Promitheas	82–95	75–77	
Panathinaikos	2–0	Aris	109–79	85–65	
Kolossos	0–2	Larisa	63–71	82–83	

=== Semifinals ===
Team 1	Series	Team 2	Game 1	Game 2	Game 3	Game 4	Game 5
Olympiacos	3–0	Promitheas	116–73	102–72	106-69		
Panathinaikos	3–2	Larisa	84–77	77-84	94-82	62-74	89-43

==== Third place series ====
Team 1	Series	Team 2	Game 1	Game 2	Game 3	Game 4	Game 5
Promitheas	3–2	Larisa	78-89	84-88	83-78	94-76	96-56

== Finals ==
Team 1	Series	Team 2	Game 1	Game 2	Game 3	Game 4	Game 5
Olympiacos	3–0	Panathinaikos	74-61	78-72	93-74		

=== Game 1 ===
11 June 2022	Olympiacos	74–61	Panathinaikos
21:00	Scoring by quarter: 23–4, 15–16, 17–18, 19–23
	Pts: Sloukas 16; Fall 14; Vezenkov 12; Rebs: Vezenkov 10; Fall 10; Asts: Walkup 4 Sloukas 4	Boxscore	Pts: Papapetrou 13; White 13; Rebs: Evans 11; Papagiannis 7 Asts: Macon 6	Arena: Peace and Friendship Stadium; Referees: Papapetrou; Poursanidis; Pitsilkas

=== Game 2 ===
14 June 2022	Panathinaikos	72–78	Olympiacos
21:00	Scoring by quarter: 21–20, 25–12, 10–29, 16–17
	Pts: Papapetrou 17; Papagiannis 12; Rebs: Papagiannis 10; Papapetrou 9 Asts: Papapetrou 2 Nedovic 2 Macon 2 Bochoridis 2	Boxscore	Pts: Sloukas 20; Vezenkov 19; Dorsey 17; Rebs: Fall 10; Martin 6 Asts: Sloukas 4	Arena: O.A.C.A. Olympic Indoor Hall; Referees: Koromilas; Tsaroucha; Kardaris

=== Game 3 ===
17 June 2022	Olympiacos	93–74	Panathinaikos
21:00	Scoring by quarter: 28–26, 27–14, 8–13, 30–21
	Pts: Vezenkov 25; Sloukas 14; Rebs: Fall 7 Vezenkov 6 Asts: Sloukas 5	Boxscore	Pts: Nedovic 23; Papagiannis 15; Rebs: Papagiannis 10; Asts: Siva 7	Arena: Peace and Friendship Stadium; Referees: Papapetrou; Poursanidis; Zacharis

== Final standings ==
Pos	Team	Pld	W	L	Qualification or Relegation
1	Olympiacos	32	31	1	Qualification to the EuroLeague
2	Panathinaikos	34	27	7	Qualification to the EuroLeague
3	Promitheas	34	17	17	Qualification to the EuroCup
4	Larisa	36	18	18	Relegation to the Greek A2 League*
5	Kolossos	26	15	11	
6	AEK	26	13	13	Qualification to the Basketball Champions League
7	Aris	26	11	15	Qualification to the FIBA Europe Cup
8	Peristeri	26	10	16	Qualification to the Basketball Champions League
9	PAOK	24	10	14	Qualification to the Basketball Champions League
10	Lavrio	24	8	18	
11	Apollon	24	8	18	
12	Ionikos	24	6	18	
13	Iraklis	24	6	18	Relegation to the Greek A2 League

- *Larisa, despite finishing among the top four teams, did not get the necessary licence to compete to the next years' competition and thus relegrated to the lower category (Greek A2 League)

== Awards ==
All official awards of the 2021–22 Greek Basket League.

=== Greek League MVP ===
Player	Team
(Bulgaria) Sasha Vezenkov	Olympiacos

=== Greek League Finals MVP ===
Player	Team
(Bulgaria) Sasha Vezenkov	Olympiacos

=== All-Greek League Team ===
Pos.	Player	Team
G	(Greece) Kostas Sloukas	Olympiacos
G	(United States) Stefan Moody	Larisa
F	(Greece) Dimitris Agravanis	Promitheas Partras
F	(Bulgaria) Sasha Vezenkov	Olympiacos
C	(Greece) Giorgos Papagiannis	Panathinaikos

=== Best Coach ===
Player	Team
(Greece) Fotis Takianos	Larisa

=== Defensive Player of the Year ===
Player	Team
(United States) Thomas Walkup	Olympiacos

=== Best Young Player ===
Player	Team
(Greece) Omiros Netzipoglou	Aris

=== Most Improved Player ===
Player	Team
(Bulgaria) Sasha Vezenkov	Olympiacos

=== Most Popular Player ===
Player	Team
(Bulgaria) Sasha Vezenkov	Olympiacos

=== Most Spectacular Player ===
Player	Team
(United States) Stefan Moody	Larisa

== Statistical leaders ==
The Greek Basket League counts official stats leaders by stats totals, and not by per game averages. It also counts the total stats for both regular season combined.

=== Performance index rating ===
Pos	Player	Club	PIR
1	(Bulgaria) Sasha Vezenkov	Olympiacos	427
2	(United States) Ousman Krubally	Larisa	378
3	(Spain) Quino Colom	AEK	378
4	(Greece) Giorgios Papagiannis	Panathinaikos	370
5	(United States) Jerai Grant	Promitheas Patras	363

=== Points ===
Pos	Player	Club	Total Points
1	(United States) Anthony Cowan Jr.	Promitheas Partras	359
2	(Greece) Giorgios Tsalmpouris	Apollon Patras	358
3	(United States) Jalen Hudson	Larisa	327
4	(Bulgaria) Sasha Vezenkov	Olympiacos	312
5	(Canada) Olivier Hanlan	Aris	312

=== Rebounds ===
Pos	Player	Club	Total Rebounds
1	(United States) Ousman Krubally	Larisa	203
2	(United States) Shakur Juiston	Aris	176
3	(United States) Chad Brown	Peristeri	166
4	(Greece) Giorgios Papagiannis	Panathinaikos	165
5	(Greece) Ioannis Kouzeloglou	AEK	145

=== Assists ===
Pos	Player	Club	Total Assists
1	(Greece) Vassilis Mouratos	Lavrio	152
2	(Spain) Quino Colom	AEK	148
3	(United States) Anthony Cowan Jr.	Aris	131
4	(Serbia) Stefan Pot	Kolossos Rodou	114
5	(Greece) Nikos Diplaros	Apollon Patras	113

== Clubs in international competitions ==
Team	Competition	Result
Olympiacos	EuroLeague	Final Four, 4th place
Panathinaikos	EuroLeague	Regular season, 13th place
Promitheas	EuroCup	Regular season, Group B, 10th place
Lavrio	Champions League	Play-ins
PAOK	Champions League	Play-ins
AEK	Champions League	Regular season, Group D, 4th place
Peristeri	Champions League	Qualifying rounds, Semifinals
Ionikos	FIBA Europe Cup	Regular season, Group F, 3rd place
Peristeri	FIBA Europe Cup	Regular season, Group G, 3rd place
Iraklis	FIBA Europe Cup	Regular season, Group E, 4th place

== See also ==
- 2021 Greek Basketball Super Cup
- 2021–22 Greek Basketball Cup
- 2021–22 Greek A2 Basket League (2nd tier)
