= Greek Basketball League Most Spectacular Player =

The Greek Basketball League Most Spectacular Player, or Greek League Most Spectacular Player , is an annual award for the "most spectacular player" of each season of Greece's top-tier level professional basketball club league, the Greek Basketball League (GBL). The award is given to the player that is deemed by the Greek sports media to have had the most impressive highlight plays of the season, which are usually in the vast majority of the time, slam dunk highlights. However, other kinds of spectacular highlight plays can also taken into account for the award.

== Most spectacular players ==
Most Spectacular Player
Season	Player	Team	Ref.
2012–13	(United States) Brent Petway	Rethymno	
2013–14	No award		
2014–15	No award		
2015–16	(United States) Okaro White	Aris	
2016–17	(United States) Mike James	Panathinaikos	
2017–18	(Greece) Thanasis Antetokounmpo	Panathinaikos	
2018–19	(Greece) Thanasis Antetokounmpo (2×)	Panathinaikos	
2020–21	(Croatia) Mario Hezonja	Panathinaikos	
2021–22	(United States) Stefan Moody	Larisa	
2022–23	(United States) Nate Renfro	PAOK	
2023–24	(France) Mathias Lessort	Panathinaikos	
2024–25	(United States) Kendrick Nunn	Panathinaikos	
2025–26	(United States) Greg Brown III	AEK	
