= Giorgos Mosialos =

Greek basketball player

Free agent
- Position: Point guard

Personal information
- Born: December 27, 1997 (age 28) Larissa, Greece
- Listed height: 6 ft 2 in (1.88 m)
- Listed weight: 160 lb (73 kg)

Career information
- College: Knox (2015–2017); Western New Mexico (2018–2020)
- NBA draft: 2020: undrafted
- Playing career: 2020–present

Career history
- 2020–2021: Larisa

Giorgos Mosialos (Greek: Γιώργος Μόσιαλος; born December 27, 1997, in Larissa, Greece) is a Greek professional basketball player who last played for Larisa of the Greek Basket League. He is 6 ft 2 in (1.88 m) tall and plays as a point guard.

== College career ==
After playing amateur basketball at the Greek local divisions, Mosialos left Greece in order to play college basketball at Knox College and at Galesburg, Illinois. After two seasons at Knox, he was transferred to Western New Mexico Mustangs, where he stayed until 2020. As a senior, Mosialos averaged 1.9 points per game.

== Professional career ==
After finishing his college career, he returned to Greece and joined Larisa of the Greek Basket League on September 5, 2020.
