= All-Greek Basketball League Team =

Greek annual basketball award

The All-Greek Basketball League Team or All-Greek League Team is an annual award for the 5 best players of each season of Greece's top-tier level professional basketball club league, the Greek Basketball League (GBL). The All-Greek Basket League Team consists of the Greek Basketball League Pentad (Best Five).

== All-Greek Basketball League Team by Season ==
Player (X) Denotes the number of times the player has been selected.
**Bold** text indicates the player who won the league's MVP in the same year.

All-Greek League Team
Season	Player	Team
2003–04	(Bulgaria) / (United States) Roderick Blakney	Maroussi
2003–04	(Greece) Nikos Chatzis	AEK
2003–04	(Greece) **Dimitris Diamantidis**	Iraklis
2003–04	(Greece) Kostas Tsartsaris	Panathinaikos
2003–04	(Greece) Lazaros Papadopoulos	Iraklis
2004–05	(Greece) **Vassilis Spanoulis**	Maroussi
2004–05	(Greece) Dimitris Diamantidis	Panathinaikos
2004–05	(United States) Pete Mickeal	Makedonikos
2004–05	(Greece) Nikos Oikonomou	Panionios
2004–05	(United States) Travis Watson	Panionios
2005–06	(Bulgaria) / (United States) Roderick Blakney	Maroussi
2005–06	(Greece) **Vassilis Spanoulis**	Panathinaikos
2005–06	(Greece) **Dimitris Diamantidis** (2×)	Panathinaikos
2005–06	(North Macedonia) / (United States) Ryan Stack	Aris
2005–06	(Greece) Sofoklis Schortsanitis	Olympiacos
2006–07	(Greece) **Dimitris Diamantidis** (3×)	Panathinaikos
2006–07	(Lithuania) Ramūnas Šiškauskas	Panathinaikos
2006–07	(Greece) Stratos Perperoglou	Panionios
2006–07	(Greece) Panos Vasilopoulos	Olympiacos
2006–07	(United States) Mike Batiste	Panathinaikos
2007–08	(Greece) Vassilis Spanoulis (3×)	Panathinaikos
2007–08	(United States) Anthony Grundy	Panellinios
2007–08	(Greece) **Dimitris Diamantidis** (4×)	Panathinaikos
2007–08	(North Macedonia) / (United States) Jeremiah Massey	Aris
2007–08	(Greece) Ioannis Bourousis	Olympiacos
2008–09	(Greece) **Vassilis Spanoulis** (4×)	Panathinaikos
2008–09	(Lithuania) Šarūnas Jasikevičius	Panathinaikos
2008–09	(United States) Mike Batiste (2×)	Panathinaikos
2008–09	(Greece) Ioannis Bourousis (2×)	Olympiacos
2008–09	(Montenegro) Nikola Peković	Panathinaikos
2009–10	(Greece) Dimitris Diamantidis (5×)	Panathinaikos
2009–10	(United States) Drew Nicholas	Panathinaikos
2009–10	(United States) Josh Childress	Olympiacos
2009–10	(Greece) Kostas Kaimakoglou	Maroussi
2009–10	(United States) **Mike Batiste** (3×)	Panathinaikos
2010–11	(Greece) Vassilis Spanoulis (5×)	Olympiacos
2010–11	(Greece) **Dimitris Diamantidis** (6×)	Panathinaikos
2010–11	(Guyana) / (United States) Rawle Marshall	PAOK
2010–11	(United States) Mike Batiste (4×)	Panathinaikos
2010–11	(Greece) Ioannis Bourousis (3×)	Olympiacos
2011–12	(Greece) **Vassilis Spanoulis** (6×)	Olympiacos
2011–12	(Greece) Dimitris Diamantidis (7×)	Panathinaikos
2011–12	(Greece) Kostas Papanikolaou	Olympiacos
2011–12	(Greece) Giorgos Printezis	Olympiacos
2011–12	(United States) Mike Batiste (5×)	Panathinaikos
2012–13	(Greece) Vassilis Spanoulis (7×)	Olympiacos
2012–13	(Greece) / (Cyprus) Nikos Pappas	Panionios
2012–13	(Greece) Dimitris Diamantidis (8×)	Panathinaikos
2012–13	(Greece) Kostas Papanikolaou (2×)	Olympiacos
2012–13	(Greece) / (Serbia) Vlado Janković	Panionios
2012–13	(Gabon) **Stéphane Lasme**	Panathinaikos
2013–14	(United States) D. J. Cooper	PAOK
2013–14	(Greece) **Dimitris Diamantidis** (9×)	Panathinaikos
2013–14	(Lithuania) Jonas Mačiulis	Panathinaikos
2013–14	(Greece) Giorgos Printezis (2×)	Olympiacos
2013–14	(Gabon) Stéphane Lasme (2×)	Panathinaikos
2014–15	(Greece) Vassilis Spanoulis (8×)	Olympiacos
2014–15	(Greece) Kostas Sloukas	Olympiacos
2014–15	(Greece) Giorgos Printezis (3×)	Olympiacos
2014–15	(Bulgaria) / (Greece) **Sasha Vezenkov**	Aris
2014–15	(Greece) Loukas Mavrokefalidis	Panathinaikos
2015–16	(Greece) **Vassilis Spanoulis** (9×)	Olympiacos
2015–16	(Greece) Dimitris Diamantidis (10x)	Panathinaikos
2015–16	(United States) Okaro White	Aris
2015–16	(Greece) Giorgos Printezis (4×)	Olympiacos
2015–16	(Greece) Loukas Mavrokefalidis (2×)	AEK
2016–17	(Greece) / (United States) **Nick Calathes**	Panathinaikos
2016–17	(Greece) Vassilis Spanoulis (10×)	Olympiacos
2016–17	(Greece) Kostas Papanikolaou (3×)	Olympiacos
2016–17	(Greece) Giorgos Printezis (5×)	Olympiacos
2016–17	(United States) Chris Singleton	Panathinaikos
2017–18	(Greece) / (United States) **Nick Calathes** (2×)	Panathinaikos
2017–18	(Georgia (country)) / (United States) Thad McFadden	Kymis
2017–18	(United States) McKenzie Moore	Lavrio
2017–18	(United States) Chris Singleton (2×)	Panathinaikos
2017–18	(Serbia) Nikola Milutinov	Olympiacos
2018–19	(Greece) / (United States) **Nick Calathes** (3×)	Panathinaikos
2018–19	(United States) Davion Berry	Panionios
2018–19	(Greece) Ioannis Papapetrou	Panathinaikos
2018–19	(Greece) Panos Vasilopoulos (2×)	Peristeri
2018–19	(Serbia) Nikola Milutinov (2×)	Olympiacos
2019–20	Cancelled due to the COVID-19 pandemic.	
2020–21	(Greece) Vassilis Mouratos	Lavrio
2020–21	(United States) Tyson Carter	Lavrio
2020–21	(Greece) **Ioannis Papapetrou** (2×)	Panathinaikos
2020–21	(Greece) Dinos Mitoglou	Panathinaikos
2020–21	(Greece) George Papagiannis	Panathinaikos
2021–22	(United States) Stefan Moody	Larisa
2021–22	(Greece) Kostas Sloukas (2×)	Olympiacos
2021–22	(Greece) Dimitris Agravanis	Promitheas Patras
2021–22	(Bulgaria) / (Greece) **Sasha Vezenkov** (2×)	Olympiacos
2021–22	(Greece) George Papagiannis (2×)	Panathinaikos
2022–23	(France) Sylvain Francisco	Peristeri
2022–23	(Greece) Kostas Sloukas (3×)	Olympiacos
2022–23	(Greece) Kostas Papanikolaou (4×)	Olympiacos
2022–23	(Bulgaria) / (Greece) **Sasha Vezenkov** (3×)	Olympiacos
2022–23	(France) Moustapha Fall	Olympiacos
2023–24	(Greece) **Kostas Sloukas** (4×)	Panathinaikos
2023–24	(United States) Kendrick Nunn	Panathinaikos
2023–24	(Greece) Kostas Papanikolaou (5×)	Olympiacos
2023–24	(Bosnia and Herzegovina) / (United States) Alec Peters	Olympiacos
2023–24	(France) Mathias Lessort	Panathinaikos
2024–25	(United States) Kendrick Nunn (2×)	Panathinaikos
2024–25	(France) Evan Fournier	Olympiacos
2024–25	(Spain) Juancho Hernangómez	Panathinaikos
2024–25	(Bulgaria) / (Greece) **Sasha Vezenkov** (4×)	Olympiacos
2024–25	(Serbia) Nikola Milutinov (3×)	Olympiacos
2025–26	(United States) Breein Tyree	PAOK
2025–26	(Greece) Tyler Dorsey	Olympiacos
2025–26	(France) **Evan Fournier** (2×)	Olympiacos
2025–26	(Bulgaria) / (Greece) Sasha Vezenkov (5×)	Olympiacos
2025–26	(Serbia) Nikola Milutinov (4×)	Olympiacos

== Players with multiple selections ==
The following table only lists players with at least two total selections, in either the First or Second Teams.

Player	Number Of Selections
(Greece) Dimitris Diamantidis	11
(Greece) Vassilis Spanoulis	10
(Greece) Giorgos Printezis	5
(United States) Mike Batiste	5
(Greece) Kostas Papanikolaou	5
(Bulgaria) / (Greece) Sasha Vezenkov	5
(Greece) Kostas Sloukas	4
(Serbia) Nikola Milutinov	4
(Greece) / (United States) Nick Calathes	3
(Greece) Ioannis Bourousis	3
(France) Evan Fournier	2
(Greece) Loukas Mavrokefalidis	2
(Greece) Ioannis Papapetrou	2
(Greece) George Papagiannis	2
(Gabon) Stéphane Lasme	2
(Greece) Panos Vasilopoulos	2
(United States) Chris Singleton	2
(Bulgaria) / (United States) Roderick Blakney	2
(United States) Kendrick Nunn	2
