= Shaquille Goodwin =

American basketball player (born 1994)

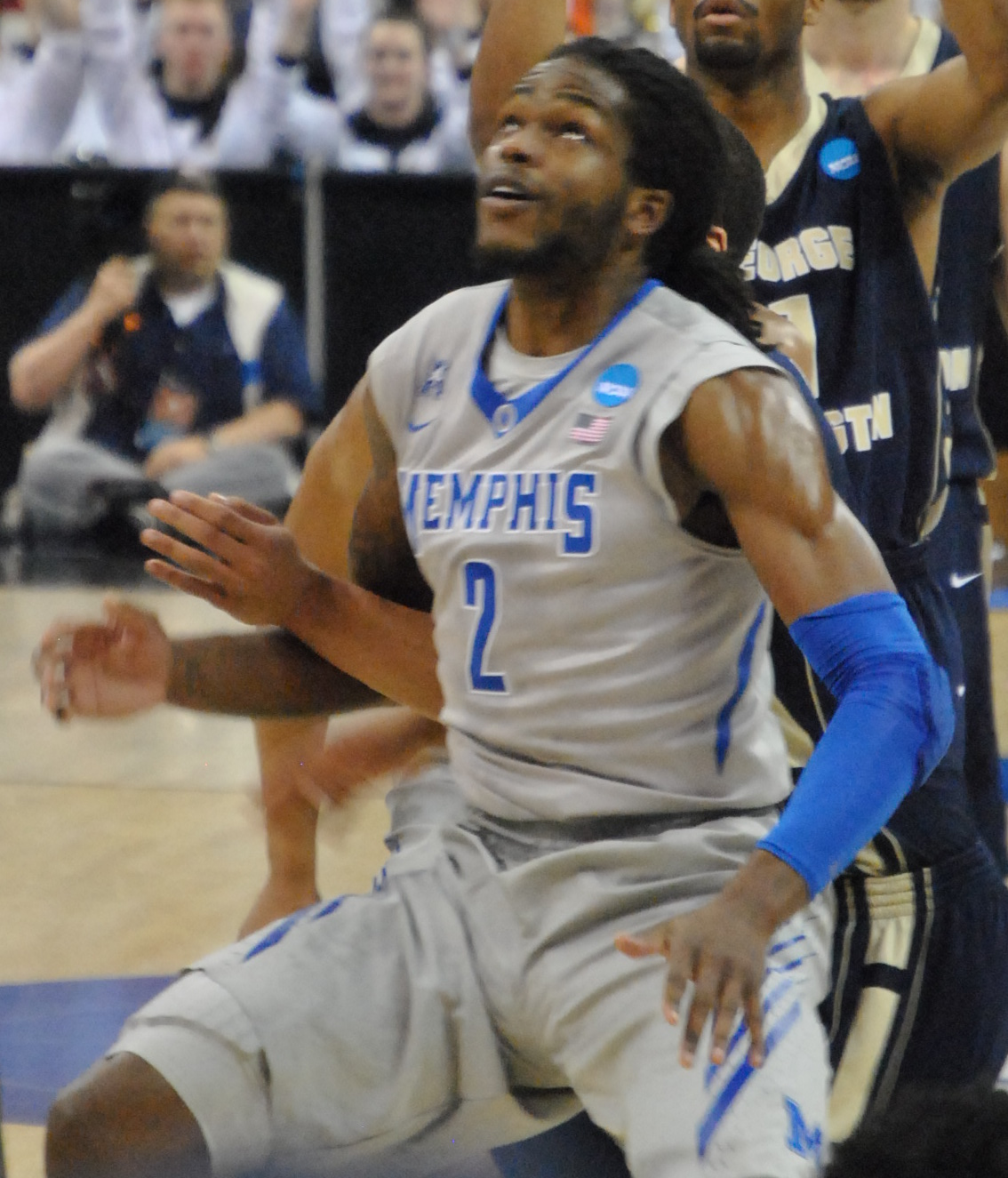
- Goodwin playing for Memphis

Personal information
- Born: September 1, 1994 (age 32) Decatur, Georgia, U.S.
- Listed height: 6 ft 9 in (2.06 m)
- Listed weight: 242 lb (110 kg)

Career information
- High school: Southwest DeKalb (Decatur, Georgia)
- College: Memphis (2012–2016)
- NBA draft: 2016: undrafted
- Playing career: 2016–present
- Position: Center / power forward

Career history
- 2016: AEK Larnaca
- 2016–2017: Science City Jena
- 2017–2018: Rethymno Cretan Kings
- 2018–2019: Scafati
- 2019–2020: Selçuklu Belediyesi
- 2020: Yalovaspor
- 2020: Larisa
- 2021: Mykolaiv
- 2021–2022: AEK Larnaca

Career highlights
- Greek League rebounding leader (2018); Cypriot Super Cup winner (2016); First-team All-AAC (2016); Second-team All-AAC (2014); Conference USA All-Freshman Team (2013); McDonald's All-American (2012)
Medals
Men's basketball
Representing United States
FIBA Americas U18 Championship
Gold medal – first place	2012 Brazil	National team

William Shaquille Goodwin (born September 1, 1994) standing at 2.06 m (6 ft 9 in), he plays at the power forward and center positions. After playing four years of college basketball at Memphis, Goodwin entered the 2016 NBA draft, but he was not selected in the draft's two rounds.

== High school career ==
Goodwin played high school basketball at Southwest Dekalb High School. He played four seasons at Southwest DeKalb High School, where he led the Panthers to back-to-back state title games in his final two seasons. He won the 2012 Atlanta Journal-Constitution slam dunk contest championship and was named to the Georgia Class AAAA All-State and 6AAAA All-Region first teams in 2011–12. Goodwin was selected All-Metro first team by the Atlanta Journal-Constitution in 2011–12 and As a senior, he averaged 21.2 points, 12.3 rebounds and 3.3 blocks per game.

== College career ==
As a freshman Goodwin played 36 games, having a solid season, producing 7.4 points and 4.4 rebounds and 1.1 blocks per game, and being included to the Conference USA All-Freshman team. As a sophomore he played in 34 contests, and improved his numbers, averaging 11.5 points, 6.5 rebounds and 1.8 blocks per game, improving his playing time to 28.9 minutes per game. During the next season, his numbers dropped averaging 9.6 points and 7.1 rebounds per game. During his final year at college, Goodwin had an impressive year, having 14.7 points 7.5 rebounds and 1.8 blocks per game in 33 games.

== Professional career ==
After going undrafted in the 2016 NBA draft, Goodwin joined AEK Larnaca of the Cypriot Basket League. On November, he left AEK Larnaca in order to join Science City Jena of the Basketball Bundesliga.

On July 1, 2017, Goodwin joined Rethymno Cretan Kings of the Greek Basket League. He averaged 12 points and 7.5 rebounds per game in Greek top division. On July 18, 2018, Goodwin signed with Scafati Basket of the Italian second division.

Goodwin spent the 2019–20 season with Yalova Belediye in the Turkish Basketball First League, where he averaged 8.8 points, 11.1 rebounds and 3.2 assists per game. On August 14, 2020, Goodwin signed with Rilski Sportist in Bulgaria. However, he moved back to Greece and signed with Larisa instead, on September 6 of the same year. On December 28, 2020, Goodwin parted ways with the Greek club.
