= Vassilis Papadopoulos (basketball) =

Greek basketball player

Vassilis Papadopoulos Βασίλης Παπαδόπουλος
Ermis Lagkada
- Position: Small forward / shooting guard
- League: Greek B Basket League

Personal information
- Born: December 22, 1998 (age 27) Thessaloniki, Greece
- Listed height: 6 ft 7.5 in (2.02 m)
- Listed weight: 225 lb (102 kg)

Career information
- High school: Mandoulides Schools
- Playing career: 2016–present

Career history
- 2016–2018: PAOK
- 2017–2018: → Ermis Agias
- 2018–2019: HANTH
- 2019–2020: Anatolia Thessaloniki
- 2020–present: Ermis Lagkada

Vassilis Papadopoulos (alternate spellings: Vasilis, Vasileios) (Greek: Βασίλης Παπαδόπουλος; born December 28, 1998) is a Greek professional basketball player for Ermis Lagkada of the Greek B Basket League. He is a 2.02 m (6 ft 7 1/2 in) tall shooting guard-small forward.

== Professional career ==
Papadopoulos joined the youth teams of PAOK Thessaloniki in the summer of 2016. In December of the same year, he signed his first professional contract with the senior men's team of PAOK. In 2017, he was loaned to the Greek club Aermis Agias. On September 12, 2020, Papadopoulos signed with Ermis Lagkada.
