= Stefan Moody =

American basketball player

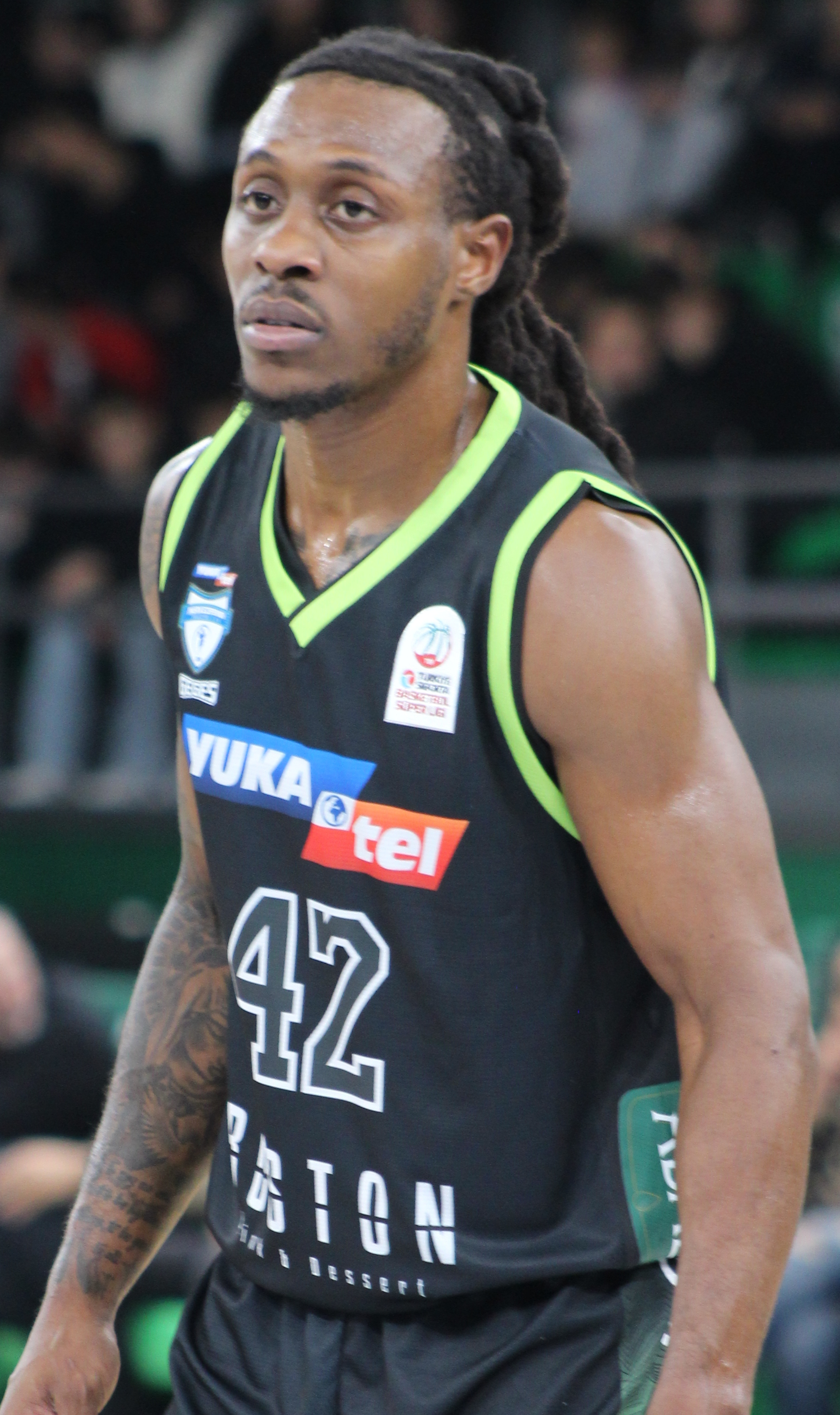
- Moody in December 2024

No. 42 – Karşıyaka Basket
- Position: Point guard
- League: Basketbol Süper Ligi

Personal information
- Born: October 6, 1993 (age 33) Kissimmee, Florida, U.S.
- Listed height: 5 ft 10 in (1.78 m)
- Listed weight: 184 lb (83 kg)

Career information
- High school: Poinciana (Osceola County, Florida)
- College: Florida Atlantic (2012–2013); Kilgore (2013–2014); Ole Miss (2014–2016)
- NBA draft: 2016: undrafted
- Playing career: 2016–present

Career history
- 2016–2017: Trabzonspor
- 2017–2018: Rethymno Cretan Kings
- 2018: Tsmoki-Minsk
- 2018: Busan KT Sonicboom
- 2019: Trotamundos de Carabobo
- 2019–2021: DEAC
- 2021–2022: Larisa
- 2022–2023: Chorale Roanne
- 2023: Trotamundos de Carabobo
- 2023: Igokea
- 2024: Qingdao Eagles
- 2024: Nanjing Monkey Kings
- 2024–2025: Merkezefendi Basket
- 2025: Sagesse Club
- 2025: Varese
- 2025–present: Karşıyaka Basket

Career highlights
- All-Greek League Team (2022); Greek League Top Scorer (2018); Greek League Most Spectacular Player (2022); Greek All Star Game Slam Dunk Champion (2018); Greek All Star (2018); 2× First-team All-SEC (2015, 2016); Second-team All-Sun Belt (2013); First-team Parade All-American (2012)

Stefan Tyler Moody (born October 6, 1993) is an American professional basketball player for Karşıyaka Basket of the Basketbol Süper Ligi (BSL). Standing at 1.78 metres (5 feet 10 inches), he plays at the point guard position. After playing one year of college basketball at FAU, one year at Kilgore College and two years at Ole Miss, Moody entered the 2016 NBA draft, but he was not selected in the draft's two rounds.

== High school ==
Moody attended and played high school basketball at Poinciana High School, in Osceola County, Florida, where he stayed until 2012 and led Poinciana High School to a 20–10 season. He was named to the Florida Class 7A all-state team and the Orlando Sentinel All-Central Florida team and to the Parade All-America team. As a senior, he averaged 27.9 points per game.

== College career ==
After graduating from Poinciana High School, Moody played one year of college basketball for FAU. He was named to the All-Sun Belt Second Team, as a freshman. After the 2012–13 season, Moody transferred to Kilgore College. After one season, he transferred again to Ole Miss. He was named to the All-Southeastern Conference First Team, as a junior and as a senior.

== Professional career ==
After going undrafted in the 2016 NBA draft, Moody joined Trabzonspor of the Turkish League. During his first pro season, Moody averaged 8.6 points and 4.1 assists per game.

On July 19, 2017, Moody joined Rethymno Cretan Kings of the Greek Basket League. On February 3, 2018, Moody scored 44 points against Koroivos, and he became the first player to score over 42 points in a Greek League game, in the last 12 years.

Moody played for DEAC of the Hungarian league between 2019 and 2021. During the 2020–21 season, he averaged 14.7 points, 5.0 assists, 4.3 rebounds and 1.7 steals per game.

On December 6, 2021, Moody signed with Larisa of the Greek Basket League. In 28 league games, he averaged 15.5 points (shooting with 39.4% from the 3-point line), 3 rebounds, 4.5 assists and 1.7 steals, playing around 32 minutes per contest.

On July 4, 2022, Moody signed with French club Chorale Roanne.

On June 3, 2023, he joined Igokea of the Bosnian League, the Adriatic League and the Basketball Champions League.

On November 20, 2024, he signed with Merkezefendi Belediyesi Denizli of the Basketbol Süper Ligi (BSL).

On June 5, 2025, he signed with Sagesse Club of the Lebanese Basketball League (LBL).

On July 29, 2025, he signed with Pallacanestro Varese of the Lega Basket Serie A (LBA).

On November 28, 2025, he signed with Karşıyaka Basket of the Basketbol Süper Ligi (BSL).

== The Basketball Tournament ==
Stefan Moody played for Armored Athlete in the 2018 edition of The Basketball Tournament. In 3 games, he averaged 8 points, 2 assists, and 1.7 rebounds per game. Armored Athlete reached the Super 16 before falling to Boeheim's Army.
