= Tyler Dorsey =

American-Greek basketball player (born 1996)

Tyler Dorsey Τάιλερ Κουίνσι Κωνσταντινίδης Ντόρσεϊ
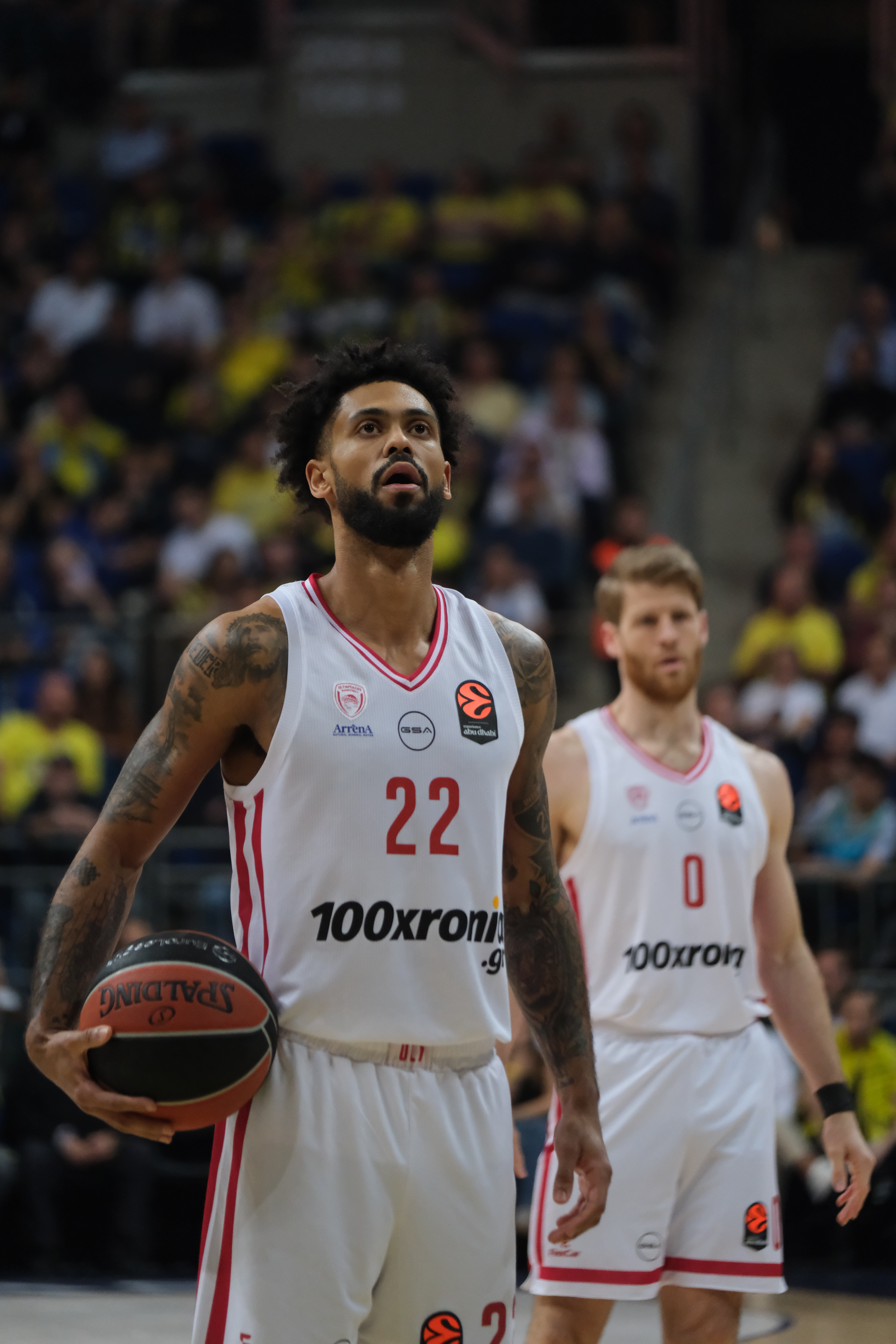
- Dorsey with Olympiacos in 2026

No. 22 – Olympiacos
- Position: Shooting guard
- League: GBL; EuroLeague

Personal information
- Born: February 18, 1996 (age 30) Pasadena, California, U.S.
- Listed height: 1.94 m (6 ft 4 in)
- Listed weight: 184 lb (83 kg)

Career information
- High school: Maranatha (Pasadena, California)
- College: Oregon (2015–2017)
- NBA draft: 2017: 2nd round, 41st overall pick
- Drafted by: Atlanta Hawks
- Playing career: 2017–present

Career history
- 2017–2019: Atlanta Hawks
- 2017–2018: →Erie BayHawks
- 2019: Memphis Grizzlies
- 2019: →Memphis Hustle
- 2019–2021: Maccabi Tel Aviv
- 2021–2022: Olympiacos
- 2022: Dallas Mavericks
- 2022: →Texas Legends
- 2023: Texas Legends
- 2023–2024: Fenerbahçe
- 2024–present: Olympiacos

Career highlights
- EuroLeague champion (2026); All-EuroLeague Second Team (2026); 3× Greek League champion (2022, 2025, 2026); Greek Cup winner (2022); 3× Greek Super Cup winner (2024–2026); All-Greek League Team (2026); Greek League Most Improved Player (2026); Greek Cup Finals MVP (2022); Greek Super Cup Finals MVP (2025); 2× Israeli Premier League champion (2020, 2021); Israeli League Cup winner (2020); Turkish Super League champion (2024); Turkish Cup winner (2024); Pac-12 All-Freshman team (2016); First-team Parade All-American (2015); Gatorade California Player of the Year (2015)
- Stats at NBA.com
- Stats at Basketball Reference
Medals
Men's basketball
Representing Greece
EuroBasket
Bronze medal – third place	2025 Cyprus–Finland–Poland–Latvia

Tyler Quincy Constantinides Dorsey (Greek: Τάιλερ Κουίνσι Κωνσταντινίδης Ντόρσεϊ, Tailer Kouinsy Konstantinidis Ntorsey; February 18, 1996) is a Greek-American professional basketball player for Olympiacos of the Greek Basket League and the EuroLeague. He is also a member of the Greek national basketball team, and plays at the shooting guard position.

After graduating from Maranatha High School in Pasadena, California, Dorsey played college basketball for the Oregon Ducks. An All-EuroLeague Second Team selection in 2025–26, he reached three EuroLeague Final Fours with Olympiacos, winning the title in 2026.

Dorsey has been a member of the Greek national team since 2022. He helped Greece capture the bronze medal at EuroBasket 2025.

== High school career ==
Dorsey initially attended Ribét Academy in his freshman season. He then transferred to St. John Bosco High School, in Bellflower, California. In his sophomore season, he began to establish himself as a solid scorer, with a 17.0 points-per-game scoring average. He made a big impact afterwards, where, as a junior, he managed to help his team win the state championship, and was the star of the team, averaging 21.4 points per game, 6.0 rebounds, and 4.7 assists per game.

In his senior year, he decided to transfer to Maranatha, due to his desire to return to his hometown of Pasadena. While there, he averaged 34.0 points per game, to go along with 10.4 rebounds, 3.7 assists, and 1.9 steals per game.

Together with his second state championship win, he earned the 2015 Gatorade State Player of the Year for California award. He had many impressive games, like the one where he scored 52 points, in an 85–60 win. He was able to be efficient in every game, shown by the fact that he finished in double figures in scoring all 30 of his games played. Despite being considered the 23rd-best player of his age group, he was not selected to play in the McDonald's All-American Game. He initially committed to play college basketball at the University of Arizona, but he changed his mind, and then committed to Oregon, instead, on February 2, 2015.

== College career ==
=== Freshman year ===
Dorsey played his first official game as an Oregon Duck, in the season opener against Jackson State, where Oregon won; and he was declared the MVP of the game, after scoring 20 points for his team, in an 80–52 win. Dorsey missed two games in the middle of the season, due to an injury, but he soon came back into form. He scored a career-high 25 points against rivals Oregon State, in a 91–81 win.

The Ducks won the Pac-12 regular season and 2016 Conference tournament. In the tournament final against the University Of Utah, Dorsey's team, Oregon, dominated, and beat Utah by a score of 88–57. Oregon's 31-point margin of victory was the largest in the Pac-12 Championship game's history. Dorsey had a stellar performance, being the top scorer, with 23 points, and having also grabbed 9 rebounds. He was picked for the All-Tournament Team, and was the tournament's top scorer.

Oregon earned the top seed in the West region, and went as the number one team of their conference into March Madness. After the season, Dorsey was one out of 162 early-entry candidates that initially declared for the 2016 NBA draft. However, he ultimately withdrew before the draft withdrawal deadline.

=== Sophomore year ===
Dorsey helped the Ducks to the finals of the Pac-12 conference tournament, and he was named to the All-Tournament Team. Later, in the NCAA tournament, Dorsey hit numerous shots down the stretch against the University of Rhode Island and the University of Michigan, to lead his team to the Final Four. Oregon was finally defeated by the eventual champions, the North Carolina Tar Heels.

== Professional career ==
=== Atlanta Hawks (2017–2019) ===
Dorsey was selected by the Atlanta Hawks, in the 2nd round of the 2017 NBA draft, with 41st overall pick of the draft. He then signed a 2-year contract with the Hawks. On November 12, 2017, Dorsey was sent by Atlanta to the Erie BayHawks, of the NBA G League, on assignment.

=== Memphis Grizzlies (2019) ===
On February 7, 2019, Dorsey was traded to the Memphis Grizzlies in exchange for Shelvin Mack. He was assigned to the Memphis Hustle on February 8 and made his debut that evening. By the end of the 2018–19 season, Dorsey was regularly playing crunch-time minutes for the Grizzlies.

=== Maccabi Tel Aviv (2019–2021) ===
On August 17, 2019, Dorsey joined Maccabi Tel Aviv of the Israeli Premier League and the EuroLeague, signing a one-year deal with an option for another one. On November 1, 2019, Dorsey recorded a EuroLeague career-high 19 points, shooting 7-of-12 from the field, along with four rebounds, three assists and two steals in a 90–65 win over Olympiacos.

=== Olympiacos (2021–2022) ===
On August 20, 2021, Dorsey joined Olympiacos of the Greek Basket League and the EuroLeague, signing a one-year deal.

=== Dallas Mavericks (2022) ===
On July 23, 2022, Dorsey signed with the Dallas Mavericks under a two-way contract. On December 26, 2022, Dorsey was waived by the Mavericks.

=== Texas Legends (2023) ===
On January 7, 2023, Dorsey was reacquired by the Texas Legends. On February 25, he parted ways with the team.

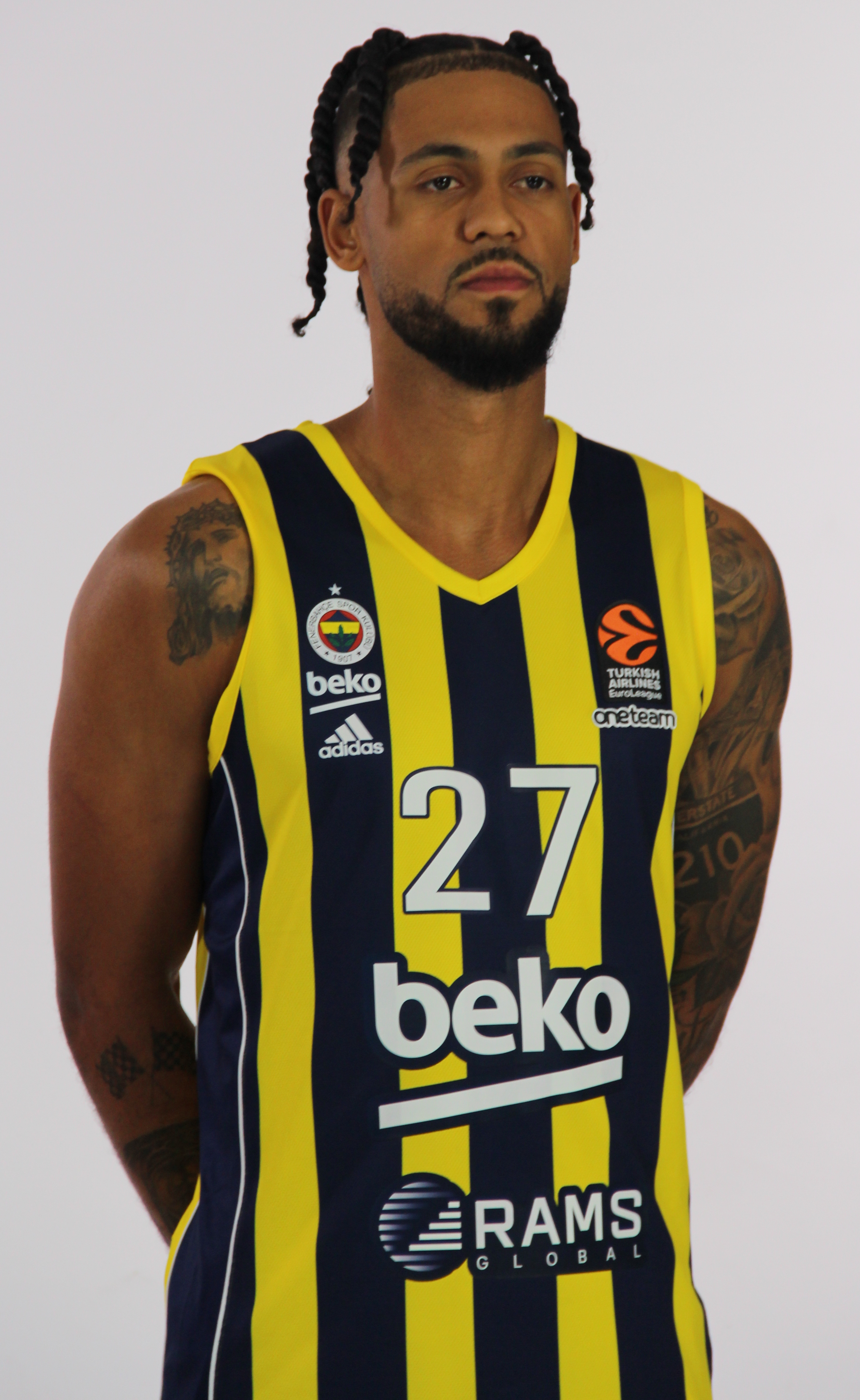
Dorsey with Fenerbahçe in 2023

=== Fenerbahçe (2023–2024) ===
On March 1, 2023, Dorsey signed with Turkish powerhouse Fenerbahçe through 2025, joining his Greek national team coach Dimitrios Itoudis, as well as his teammates Nick Calathes and Kostas Antetokounmpo.

=== Return to Olympiacos (2024–present) ===
On June 30, 2024, Dorsey signed a three-year contract with Olympiacos, returning to the club after two seasons.

In October 2026, Dorsey would remain sidelined from the team for one month, due to a disciplinary infraction.

== National team career ==
=== Greek junior national team ===
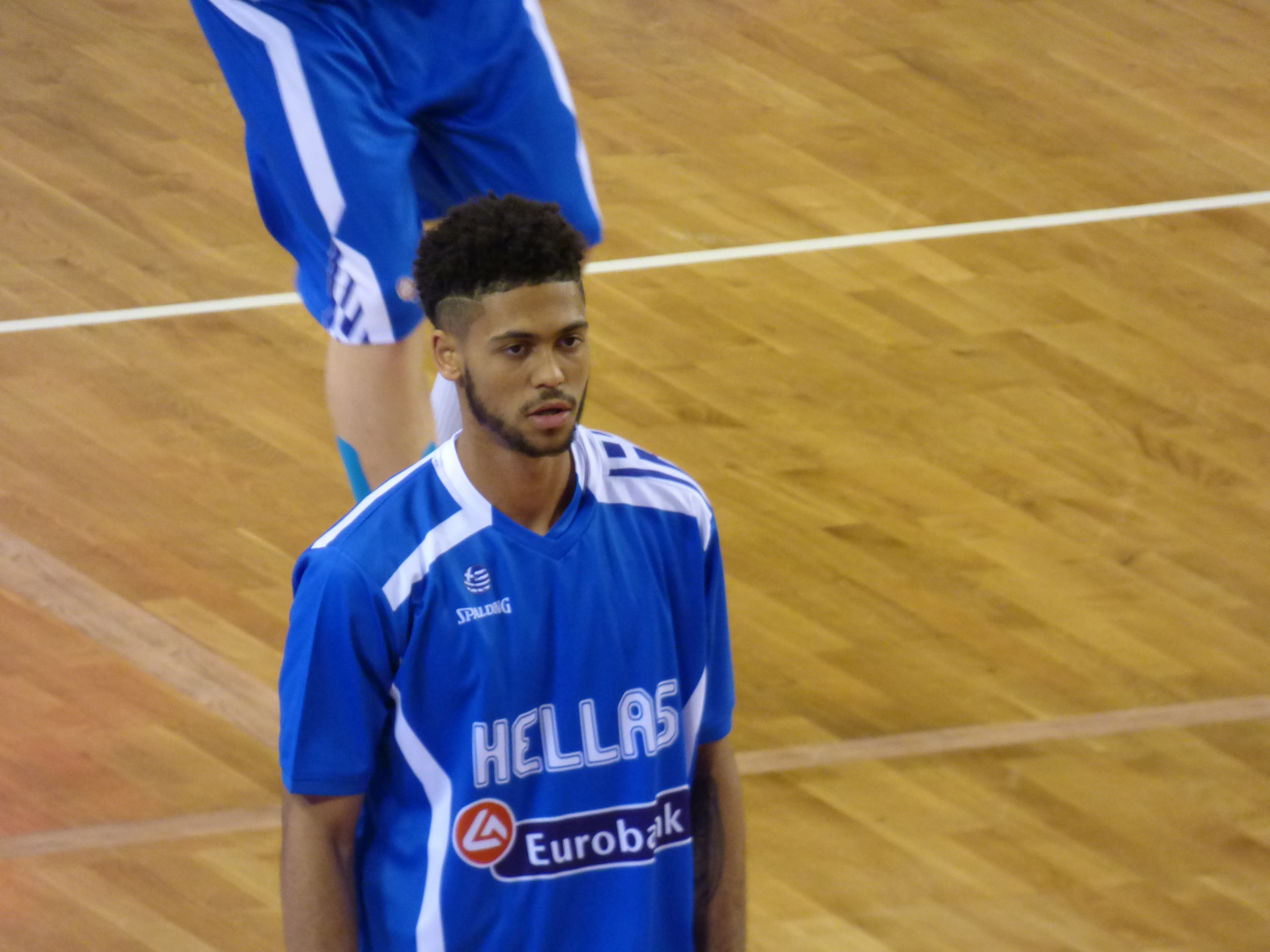
Dorsey, with the Greek Under-19 national team, during the 2015 FIBA Under-19 World Cup.

Dorsey was originally cut from a USA Basketball tryout camp for its Under-18 national team in 2014. The next year, before the 2015 FIBA Under-19 World Cup began, he was invited to Greece's Under-19 national team tryout camp, for which he was eligible due to his mother's Greek family. He turned out to be a vital addition to the team, as he went on to record 15.9 points and 5.0 rebounds per game, and also lead the team in minutes played. The Greek team went 5–2. After winning their first 5 games, they fell to the USA in a tight semi-final, and later lost in the bronze medal game to Turkey. He was voted onto the tournament's best team, despite his team not earning a spot on the medals podium.

=== Greek senior national team ===
On June 6, 2016, Dorsey was named to the senior men's Greek national basketball team's 16-man preliminary training camp roster for the 2016 Turin FIBA World Olympic qualifying tournament. He played with the senior team in 3 friendly games, however, he did not make the actual 12-man roster that would compete at the tournament.

Dorsey played for Greece at the 2019 FIBA World Cup qualification. He appeared in two friendly games against France and Montenegro, and appeared in two qualification games against Georgia and Serbia.

Dorsey was on Greece's roster for EuroBasket 2022. On September 2, he scored 27 points in a 89–85 opening day win over Croatia.

Dorsey returned to Greece for Eurobasket 2025. He averaged 12.6 points per game, 2.8 rebounds, and 2.1 assists on 44% shooting. Dorsey played a key role as Greece finished in 3rd place, earning a spot on the medal podium for the first time at a major tournament since 2009. Dorsey finished the tournament as Greece's second leading scorer, behind Giannis Antetokounmpo.

Dorsey played for Greece at the 2027 FIBA World Cup Qualification. He appeared in two friendly games vs Poland and Cyprus, and two qualification games vs Spain and Ukraine. On August 31, 2026, vs Spain, he scored 29 points and made several clutch shots leading Greece to a thrilling 108–106 overtime win.

== Awards and accomplishments ==
=== Titles won ===
- EuroLeague Champion 2026 with (Olympiacos Piraeus)
- 2× Israeli League Champion: 2020, 2021 (with Maccabi Tel Aviv)
- Turkish Super League Champion: 2024 (with Fenerbahçe)
- 3× Greek League Champion: 2022, 2025, 2026 (with Olympiacos Piraeus)
- Greek Cup Winner: 2022 (with Olympiacos Piraeus)
- Turkish Cup Winner: 2024 (with Fenerbahçe)
- 3× Greek Super Cup Winner: 2024, 2025, 2026 (with Olympiacos Piraeus)
- Israeli League Cup Winner: 2020 (with Maccabi Tel Aviv)

=== Greek national team ===
- 2025 EuroBasket: Bronze

=== Individual awards and accomplishments ===
==== European awards ====
- All-EuroLeague Second Team: 2026

==== Domestic awards ====
- All-Greek League Team: 2026
- Greek League Most Improved Player: 2026
- Greek Cup Finals MVP: 2022
- Greek Cup Finals Top Scorer: 2022
- Greek Supercup Finals MVP: 2025
- Greek Supercup Finals Top Scorer: 2025

==== Youth club awards ====
- Pac-12 All-Freshman Team: 2016
- First-team Parade All-American 2015
- Gatorade California Player of the Year: 2015

==== Greece youth national team tournaments awards ====
- All-U19 World Cup Team: 2015

== Club career statistics ==
Legend
GP	Games played	GS	Games started	MPG	Minutes per game
FG%	Field-goal percentage	3P%	3-point field-goal percentage	FT%	Free-throw percentage
RPG	Rebounds per game	APG	Assists per game	SPG	Steals per game
BPG	Blocks per game	PPG	Points per game	PIR	Performance index rating
**Bold**	Career high

=== NBA ===
==== Regular season ====
Year	Team	GP	GS	MPG	FG%	3P%	FT%	RPG	APG	SPG	BPG	PPG
2017–18	Atlanta	**56**	5	17.4	.377	.362	**.714**	2.3	1.4	**.3**	**.1**	7.2
2018–19	Atlanta	27	0	9.3	.360	.256	.615	1.6	.6	**.3**	.0	3.3
2018–19	Memphis	21	**11**	**21.3**	.429	.366	.629	**3.3**	**1.9**	**.3**	.0	**9.8**
2022–23	Dallas	3	0	2.7	**.800**	**.500**	—	.7	—	—	—	3.0
Career		107	16	15.7	.392	.351	.669	2.3	1.3	.3	.1	6.6

=== EuroLeague ===
†	Denotes season in which Dorsey won the EuroLeague
*	Led the league

-

Year	Team	GP	GS	MPG	FG%	3P%	FT%	RPG	APG	SPG	BPG	PPG	PIR
2019–20	Maccabi Tel Aviv	28*	1	18.9	.385	.389	.683	2.4	1.5	**1.0**	**.1**	9.9	7.4
2020–21	Maccabi Tel Aviv	34	4	21.9	.431	.394	.788	**2.7**	1.6	.6	**.1**	11.2	9.7
2021–22	Olympiacos	38	38*	24.2	.443	.374	.781	2.3	2.0	.5	**.1**	12.8	10.3
2022–23	Fenerbahçe	13	8	21.4	.392	.327	.774	1.5	1.5	.4	—	9.0	6.1
2023–24	Fenerbahçe	38	16	17.6	.441	**.454**	**.831**	1.8	1.2	.2	**.1**	8.7	7.5
2024–25	Olympiacos	20	2	10.0	.328	.293	.600	1.0	1.0	.2	—	3.3	2.0
2025–26†	Olympiacos	**43**	**42**	**25.1**	**.452**	.389	.791	2.4	**2.8**	.2	**.1**	**15.9**	**13.7**
Career		214	111	20.4	.429	.388	.772	2.1	1.5	.5	.1	11.0	9.1

=== Domestic leagues ===
Year	Team	League	GP	MPG	FG%	3P%	FT%	RPG	APG	SPG	BPG	PPG
2017–18	(United States) Erie BayHawks	G League	10	33.3	.424	.427	.759	6.5	1.2	.2	.2	19.1
2018–19	(United States) Erie BayHawks	G League	1	43.9	.500	.200	.929	13.0	6.0	2.0	2.0	36.0
2018–19	(United States) Memphis Hustle	G League	4	28.6	.500	.387	1.000	5.5	4.7	2.0	.5	24.2
2019–20	(Israel) Maccabi Tel Aviv	Ligat HaAl	26	25.2	.455	.389	.717	4.4	3.2	1.1	.1	12.9
2020–21	(Israel) Maccabi Tel Aviv	Ligat HaAl	13	23.5	.421	.439	.808	3.3	2.1	.4	.3	11.7
2021–22	(Greece) Olympiacos	GBL	32	20.0	.436	.404	.833	2.2	1.8	.9	.2	10.7
2022–23	(United States) Texas Legends	G League	12	30.7	.396	.370	.800	4.6	2.7	.6	.2	18.9
2022–23	(Turkey) Fenerbahçe	TBSL	4	19.8	.440	.357	.667	2.2	.7	.5	—	7.7
2023–24	(Turkey) Fenerbahçe	TBSL	14	19.7	.460	.391	.900	2.8	2.6	.7	—	11.2
2024–25	(Greece) Olympiacos	GBL	28	17.8	.394	.326	.891	1.7	1.5	.7	—	9.5
2025–26	(Greece) Olympiacos	GBL	24	21.4	.442	.432	.873	2.3	2.8	.5	.1	13.1

=== College ===
Year	Team	GP	GS	MPG	FG%	3P%	FT%	RPG	APG	SPG	BPG	PPG
2015–16	Oregon	36	35	**30.1**	.441	.406	.712	**4.3**	**2.0**	**.8**	**.2**	13.4
2016–17	Oregon	**39**	**39**	30.0	**.467**	**.423**	**.755**	3.5	1.7	**.8**	.1	**14.6**
Career		75	74	30.0	.455	.416	.732	3.9	1.8	.8	.1	14.1

== Personal life ==
Dorsey acquired dual citizenship (full citizenship with both the United States and Greece) and a Greek passport, due to his mother's Greek background. His maternal grandfather, Ioannis Konstantinidis, was Greek. His mother, Samia, was born in Jerusalem. Dorsey's father is African-American.

== Sources ==
1. Blue-chip basketball recruit Tyler Dorsey to transfer out of St. John Bosco to Maranatha
2. National POY Watch: Maranatha guard Tyler Dorsey looks to lead his team to a California state championship
3. Column: Maranatha's Tyler Dorsey ready for a run at another state title
4. Oregon Ducks 5-star commit will not sign National Letter of Intent
5. Doing it the right way: How Tyler Dorsey exemplifies humility in a game full of egos
6. DraftExpress – Tyler Dorsey DraftExpress Profile: Stats, Comparisons, and Outlook
7. Tyler Dorsey Stats, News, Bio
8. Tyler Dorsey
9. Tyler Dorsey (@TDORSEY_1) on X
10. http://www.oregonlive.com/ducks/index.ssf/2016/02/tyler_dorsey_and_the_oregon_du.htm;
11. Tyler DORSEY at the FIBA U19 World Championship 2015
