= Ioannis Vavatsikos =

Greek basketball player

ASK Karditsas
- Position: Small forward / power forward
- League: Greek 2nd division

Personal information
- Born: August 17, 1990 (age 36) Larissa, Greece
- Listed height: 6 ft 7 in (2.01 m)
- Listed weight: 210 lb (95 kg)

Career information
- NBA draft: 2012: undrafted
- Playing career: 2007–present

Career history
- 2007–2008: Olympias Patras
- 2008–2010: Near East
- 2010–2011: Maroussi
- 2011–2012: AEK Argous
- 2012–2013: AEK Athens
- 2013–2014: Ilysiakos
- 2014–2015: Ethnikos Piraeus
- 2015–2016: GS Larissa
- 2016–2017: Ermis Agias
- 2017–2018: Faros Larissas
- 2018–2019: Kastoria
- 2019–2020: Larisa
- 2020–present: Karditsa

Ioannis "Giannis" Vavatsikos (alternate spelling: Yannis) (Greek: Ιωάννης "Γιάννης" Βαβάτσικος; born August 17, 1990) is a Greek professional basketball player for Karditsa of the Greek 2nd division. He is a 2.01 m (6 ft 7 in) tall small forward-power forward.

== Professional career ==
Vavatsikos signed with the Greek Basket League club GSL Faros, in 2017. He then became the club's team captain.

On June 28, 2018, he joined Kastoria of the Greek 2nd division.
