= Rethymno Cretan Kings B.C. =

Greek basketball team

Rethymno Cretan Kings
- Leagues: Greek 4th Division
- Founded: 1986; 39 years ago
- History: List: A.G.O. Rethymno (1986–2008) Rethymno B.C. (2008–2013) Rethymno Aegean B.C. (2013–2015) Rethymno Cretan Kings B.C. (2015–present)
- Arena: Melina Merkouri Indoor Hall
- Capacity: 1,600
- Location: Rethymno, Crete, Greece
- Team colors: Gold and Wine
- Main sponsor: Cretan Kings Zythos
- President: Giannis Kalaitzakis
- Head coach: Dimitris Mitropoulos
- 2019–20 position: Greek League, 11th
- Championships: 1 Greek 3rd Division; 1 Greek 4th Division
- Website: rethymnobc.gr
Home	Away

Rethymno Cretan Kings B.C., or simply Cretan Kings (Greek: Ρέθυμνο Κρητικοί K.A.E.), is a Greek formerly professional sports basketball club that was founded on the Greek island of Crete, in Rethymno, Greece, in 1986. The club is also commonly known as Rethymno B.C. (Ρέθυμνο K.A.E.).

The team was previously known as Rethymno Aegean B.C. (Ρέθυμνο Aegean K.A.E.), or Athlitikos Gymnastikos Omilos Rethymnou (Α.G.Ο.R.) (Αθλητικός Γυμναστικός Όμιλος Ρεθύμνου (Α.Γ.Ο.Ρ.). The team's parent athletic club was founded in 1965.

== History ==
To date, Rethymno's greatest accomplishment occurred during the 2006–07 season, when the team qualified to play in the final of the Greek Cup, after defeating the top-tier level Greek League teams PAOK, Panionios, Sporting, and Kolossos Rodou. Rethymno was finally defeated by the EuroLeague powerhouse Panathinaikos, by a score of 87–48, in the final game of the 2007 Greek Cup, but nevertheless, Rethymno secured a new strong place in the Greek pro leagues after the team's showing.

After previously being named Rethymno Aegean, the club changed its name to Rethymno Cretan Kings, or simply Cretan Kings, in 2015.

In the summer of 2020, after the departure of owner Kostis Zobanakis, it was decided that the club would be voluntarily relegated to the local divisions and start anew.

=== Logos ===
(to 2010)

(2010–2015)

(2015–2018)

(2018–present)

== Arena ==
Rethymno plays its home games at the Melina Merkouri Indoor Hall. The arena originally had a capacity of 1,100, but it was expanded to 1,600, when the club first joined the top-tier level Greek Basket League. There are currently plans to further expand the arena again, in the near future.

== Season by season ==
Season	Tier	Division	Pos.	P/S	Greek Cup	Europe	
2000–01	4	C Basket League	6th	—	—	—	
2001–02	4	C Basket League	3rd	—	—	—	
2002–03	4	C Basket League	4th	—	—	—	
2003–04	4	C Basket League	1st	Promoted	—	—	
2004–05	3	B Basket League	1st	Promoted	—	—	
2005–06	2	A2 Basket League	3rd	—	—	—	
2006–07	2	A2 Basket League	3rd	Promoted	Runner-up	—	
2007–08	1	Greek Basket League	13th	Relegated	—	—	
2008–09	2	A2 Basket League	6th	—	—	—	
2009–10	2	A2 Basket League	7th	—	—	—	
2010–11	2	A2 Basket League	2nd	Promoted	—	—	
2011–12	1	Greek Basket League	5th	Quarterfinalist	—	—	
2012–13	1	Greek Basket League	5th	Fourth place	—	—	
2013–14	1	Greek Basket League	9th	—	—	—	
2014–15	1	Greek Basket League	6th	Quarterfinalist	—	—	
2015–16	1	Greek Basket League	8th	Quarterfinalist	Quarterfinals	—	
2016–17	1	Greek Basket League	6th	Quarterfinalist	—	—	
2017–18	1	Greek Basket League	10th	—		—	—
2018–19	1	Greek Basket League	9th	—		—	—

== Honors and titles ==
Greek Cup

- Runner-up (1): 2006–07

Greek B Basket League

- Champions (1): 2004–05

Greek C Basket League 2nd Group

- Champions (1): 2003–04

== Notable players ==
Note: Flags indicate national team eligibility at FIBA-sanctioned events. Players may hold other non-FIBA nationalities not displayed.

Criteria

To appear in this section a player must have either:

- Set a club record or won an individual award while at the club
- Played at least one official international match for their national team at any time
- Played at least one official NBA match at any time.

- (Greece) Nikos Angelopoulos
- (Greece) Georgios Dedas
- (Greece) Periklis Dorkofikis
- (Greece) Ioannis Gagaloudis
- (Greece) Charis Giannopoulos
- (Greece) Andreas Glyniadakis
- (Greece) Kostas Kakaroudis
- (Greece) Giannis Kalampokis
- (Greece) Akis Kallinikidis
- (Greece) Sotirios Karapostolou
- (Greece) Nestoras Kommatos
- (Greece) Fanis Koumpouras
- (Greece) Spyros Magkounis
- (Greece) Nikos Papanikolaou
- (Greece) Ioannis Psathas
- (Greece) Apollon Tsochlas
- (Greece) Ian Vougioukas
- (Estonia) Gregor Arbet
- (Republic of Ireland) Brian Fitzpatrick
- (Netherlands) Charlon Kloof
- (Netherlands) Roeland Schaftenaar
- (Serbia) Uroš Duvnjak
- (Serbia) Dejan Kravić
- (Serbia) Damir Latović
- (Serbia) Stevan Nadjfeji
- (Serbia) Milenko Topić
- (Lithuania) Tomas Delininkaitis
- (Russia) Yaroslav Korolev
- (United Kingdom) Tarick Johnson
- (Senegal) Mouhammad Faye
- (United States) (Ukraine) Steve Burtt Jr.
- (United States) (Bosnia and Herzegovina) Zack Wright
- (United States) Kwame Alexander
- (United States) Robert Arnold
- (United States) J'Covan Brown
- (United States) T. J. Carter
- (United States) Dionte Christmas
- (United States) Keith Clanton
- (United States) Vincent Council
- (United States) Travis Daniels
- (United States) Toarlyn Fitzpatrick
- (United States) Reggie Freeman
- (United States) Kenny Gabriel
- (United States) Shaquille Goodwin
- (United States) Ryan Harrow
- (United States) Anthony Hickey
- (United States) Damian Hollis
- (United States) Paris Horne
- (United States) Aaron Jones
- (United States) Walter Lemon Jr.
- (United States) Rashad Madden
- (United States) Stefan Moody
- (United States) Larry O'Bannon
- (United States) Brent Petway
- (United States) Gabe Pruitt
- (United States) Trevis Simpson
- (United States) Tyler Stone
- (United States) Gary Talton
- (United States) David Young
- (United States) Conner Frankamp

== Head coaches ==
Head coach	Years
(Greece) Stergios Koufos	2003–2007
(Greece) Argyris Pedoulakis	2007–2008
(Greece) Fotis Takianos	2008–2009
(Greece) Stavros Mykoniatis	2009
(Greece) Nikos Karagiannis	2009–2010
(Greece) Stavros Mykoniatis	2010
(Greece) Stergios Koufos	2010–2013
(Greece) Thanasis Giaples	2013–2014
(Greece) Georgios Kalafatakis	2014
(Greece) Thanasis Skourtopoulos	2014–2016
(Greece) Kostas Flevarakis	2016
(Cyprus) (Greece) Tony Konstantinidis	2016–2017
(Greece) Nikos Vetoulas	2017–2018
(Greece) Stavros Mykoniatis	2018
(Greece) Vangelis Ziagkos	2018–2020
