= Jalen Hudson =

American basketball player (born 1996)

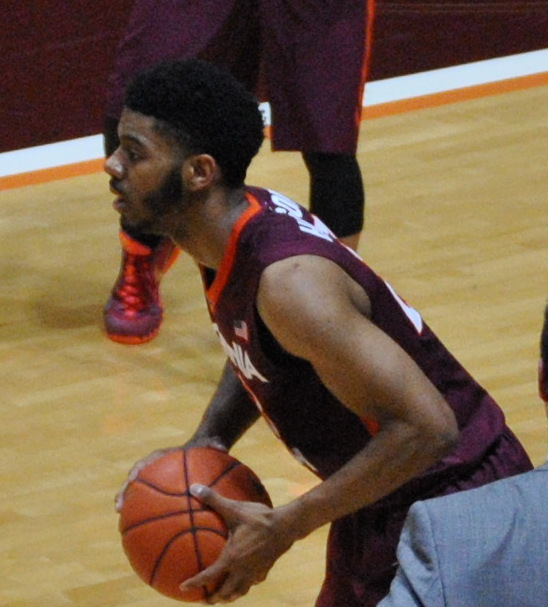
- Hudson with Virginia Tech in 2016

Free agent
- Position: Shooting guard / small forward

Personal information
- Born: May 21, 1996 (age 30) Akron, Ohio, U.S.
- Listed height: 6 ft 6 in (1.98 m)
- Listed weight: 192 lb (87 kg)

Career information
- High school: St. Vincent–St. Mary (Akron, Ohio)
- College: Virginia Tech (2014–2016); Florida (2017–2019)
- NBA draft: 2019: undrafted
- Playing career: 2019–present

Career history
- 2019–2020: Capital City Go-Go
- 2021: Telekom Baskets Bonn
- 2021–2022: Larisa
- 2022: Hapoel Galil Elyon
- 2023: TNT Tropang Giga
- 2023: Pallacanestro Trieste
- 2023–2024: Yukatel Merkezefendi
- 2026: Converge FiberXers

Jalen Andreas Hudson (born May 21, 1996) is an American professional basketball player who last played for the Converge FiberXers of the Philippine Basketball Association (PBA). He played college basketball for the Virginia Tech Hokies and the Florida Gators.

== High school career ==
Hudson attended St. Vincent–St. Mary High School in Akron, Ohio, where he was coached by Dru Joyce. As a senior, he led the Irish to the Division II state semifinal. In the semifinal game, a 56–51 loss to Bishop Watterson, he still had a good game with 18 points. Along with teammate V. J. King, Hudson was a first-team member of the Division II All-Ohio and Northeast Inland District teams.

== College career ==
Hudson was recruited to Virginia Tech by James Johnson and honored his commitment after he was fired. Hudson averaged 7.7 points per game as a freshman. He posted 8.4 points and 2.3 rebounds as a sophomore and showed flashes of brilliance, including a 27-point performance in a loss to Louisville and 28 in the Hokies' NIT victory over Princeton. After his sophomore season, he transferred to Florida, choosing the Gators over Texas because he liked coach Mike White. He said his relationship with coach Buzz Williams was not very good and he was unhappy after his freshman year but persevered for another season.

Per NCAA regulations, Hudson had to sit out the 2016–17 season but was Florida's best player in practice. He had a career-high 35 points including eight three-pointers on November 25, 2017, in a 111–105 overtime win over Gonzaga. The following game, an 87–84 loss to Duke, Hudson had a double double with 24 points and 10 rebounds. He led Florida to a 21–13 record and appearance in the Round of 32 of the NCAA Tournament, where the Gators lost 69–66 to Texas Tech despite 23 points from Hudson. As a junior at Florida, Hudson averaged 15.5 points and 3.9 rebounds per game and led the team in three-pointers with 78. After the season he opted to declare for the 2018 NBA draft without hiring an agent, thereby keeping his collegiate eligibility. On May 29, he announced he was withdrawing from the draft and returning to Florida. As a senior, Hudson struggled for the first half of the season and his averages dipped to 9.3 points and 2.9 rebounds per game. He finished his career with 1,387 points.

== Professional career ==
After not being selected in the 2019 NBA draft, Hudson joined the Cleveland Cavaliers for the 2019 NBA Summer League. On August 25, 2019, Hudson signed his first professional contract with Hapoel Ramat Gan Givatayim of the Israeli National League. However, on September 9, 2019, he parted ways with the team before appearing in a game for them. On October 26, 2019, Hudson was selected with the 7th overall pick in the first round of the 2019 NBA G League draft by the Capital City Go-Go. Hudson scored a season-high 23 points on January 9, 2020, in a 120–118 triple overtime loss to the Maine Red Claws.

On February 16, 2021, he signed with Telekom Baskets Bonn of the Basketball Bundesliga (BBL). Hudson averaged 6.9 points, 1.7 rebounds, and 1.1 steals per game.

On August 31, 2021, Hudson signed with Larisa of the Greek Basket League. In 32 league games, he averaged 13.1 points, 5.2 rebounds and 1.3 assists, playing around 28 minutes per contest.

On September 4, 2022, he signed with Hapoel Galil Elyon of the Israeli Premier League.

In January 2023, he signed with the TNT Tropang Giga of the Philippine Basketball Association (PBA) as the team's import for the 2023 PBA Governors' Cup. On February 8, Hudson recorded 56 points, 12 rebounds, and four assists in a 128–122 against the Converge FiberXers.

On March 8, 2023, he signed with Pallacanestro Trieste of the Lega Basket Serie A (LBA).

On July 26, 2023, he signed with Yukatel Merkezefendi of the Basketbol Süper Ligi (BSL).

On June 27, 2026, Hudson returns to the PBA as he signed with the Converge FiberXers as its import for the 2026 PBA Governors' Cup.
