= Fotis Takianos =

Greek basketball professional player and professional basketball coach (born 1969)

Fotis Takianos Φώτης Τακιανός
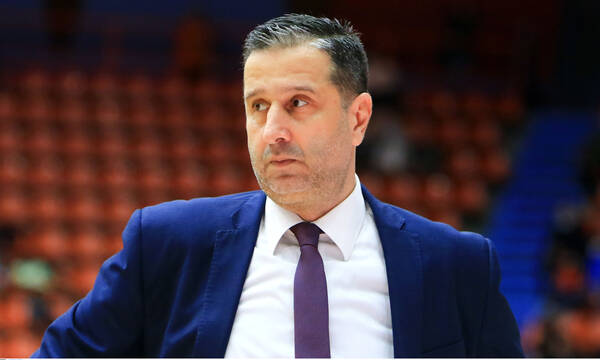
- Takianos with Larisa B.C.

Personal information
- Born: April 14, 1969 (age 57) Thessaloniki, Greece
- Listed height: 6 ft 6 in (1.98 m)

Career information
- Playing career: 1988–2000
- Position: Point guard
- Coaching career: 2004–present

Career history

Playing
- 1988–1993: Makedonikos
- 1993–1994: PAOK Thessaloniki
- 1994–1995: Aris Thessaloniki
- 1995–1997: KAOD
- 1997–1999: MENT
- 1999–2000: Siatista

Coaching
- 2004–2005: Iraklis Thessaloniki (assistant)
- 2005–2006: AEK Athens (assistant)
- 2006–2007: PAOK Thessaloniki (assistant)
- 2007–2008: Panorama
- 2008–2009: Rethymno
- 2009–2011: KAOD
- 2012–2015: OFI Crete
- 2015–2017: Doxa Lefkadas
- 2017: Bashkimi
- 2017–2018: Trikala Aries
- 2018–2019: Apollon Limassol
- 2019–2020: Qatar Sports Club Doha
- 2020–2021: Apollon Limassol
- 2021: Rahoveci
- 2021–2022: Larisa
- 2023–2024: PAOK Thessaloniki
- 2024: Astana
- 2024–2025: Maroussi
- 2025–2026: Golden Eagle Ylli

Career highlights
- As player: FIBA Korać Cup champion (1994); As coach: Greek League Coach of the Year (2022)

Fotios "Fotis" Takianos (Greek: Φώτης Τακιανός; born April 14, 1969) is a Greek former professional basketball player and current basketball coach, who most recently served as the head coach for Golden Eagle Ylli of the Kosovo Basketball Superleague.

== Coaching career ==
After retiring from playing basketball, Fotis Takianos became a full-time basketball coach. He started by serving as an assistant coach (2004–2007) at Iraklis, A.E.K. B.C. and P.A.O.K. BC in the Greek Basket League, before he was appointed as the head coach of Panorama B.C. for the first time in March 2007 in Greek 2nd Division. In Greek 2nd Division, he has also served Rethymno Cretan Kings B.C., KAO Dramas, O.F.I B.C., Doxa Lefkadas.

In 2004, he travelled in Memphis to participate to the Coaching Camp, Pre-Season Camp Memphis Grizzlies/University of MEMPHIS/University of Kentucky from where he earns significant experience.

In the highlights of his coaching career, for the 2016–17 season, as the Head coach guided Doxa Lefkadas to grant a wildcard to play in the top-tier level Greek Basket League for the first time. Also, under his coaching instructions Rethymno Cretan Kings B.C. ended 2007–2008 season as a Runner Up.

Fotis Takianos has also served Greek Basket League as the Head coach to Trikala Aries B.C.

His international career in 1st Divisions included Head coaching directions to Bashkimi Prizren of Qatar, Apollon Limassol B.C. of Cyprus, Bashkimi Prizren and KB Rahoveci of Kosovo.

On November 18, 2021, Takianos returned to Greece for Larisa, replacing Nikos Papanikolopoulos. He led the team for the first time to the Greek Basket League playoffs, finishing the regular season in 6th place and reaching the playoff semi-finals, where the team managed to win two games against favorites Panathinaikos.

On February 20, 2023, Takianos signed with PAOK Thessaloniki through 2024, replacing Aris Lykogiannis. He left PAOK in February 2024, and after a few days, he was appointed as the new head coach of Astana.

During the 2024–2025 campaign, Takianos coached Maroussi from December 2024 (having replaced Ilias Zouros) until April 2025 (replaced by his assistant Marios Batis).

== Professional career ==
During his professional playing career, Fotis Takianos played with the following clubs: Aris, PAOK, Makedonikos, KAOD and MENT. In the highlights of his playing career, he was a player of P.A.O.K. BC when they won the FIBA Korać Cup in 1994 defeating Stefanel Trieste after the 2 finals. Takianos played only in one game against Stroitel Samara and he scored four points. He missed the entire season due to a serious injury.

== Awards and accomplishments ==
=== Coaching career ===
- Coach of the year 2022, Greek Basket League

=== Playing career ===
- FIBA Korać Cup Champion:
  - 1994
