= Okaro White =

American basketball player (born 1992)

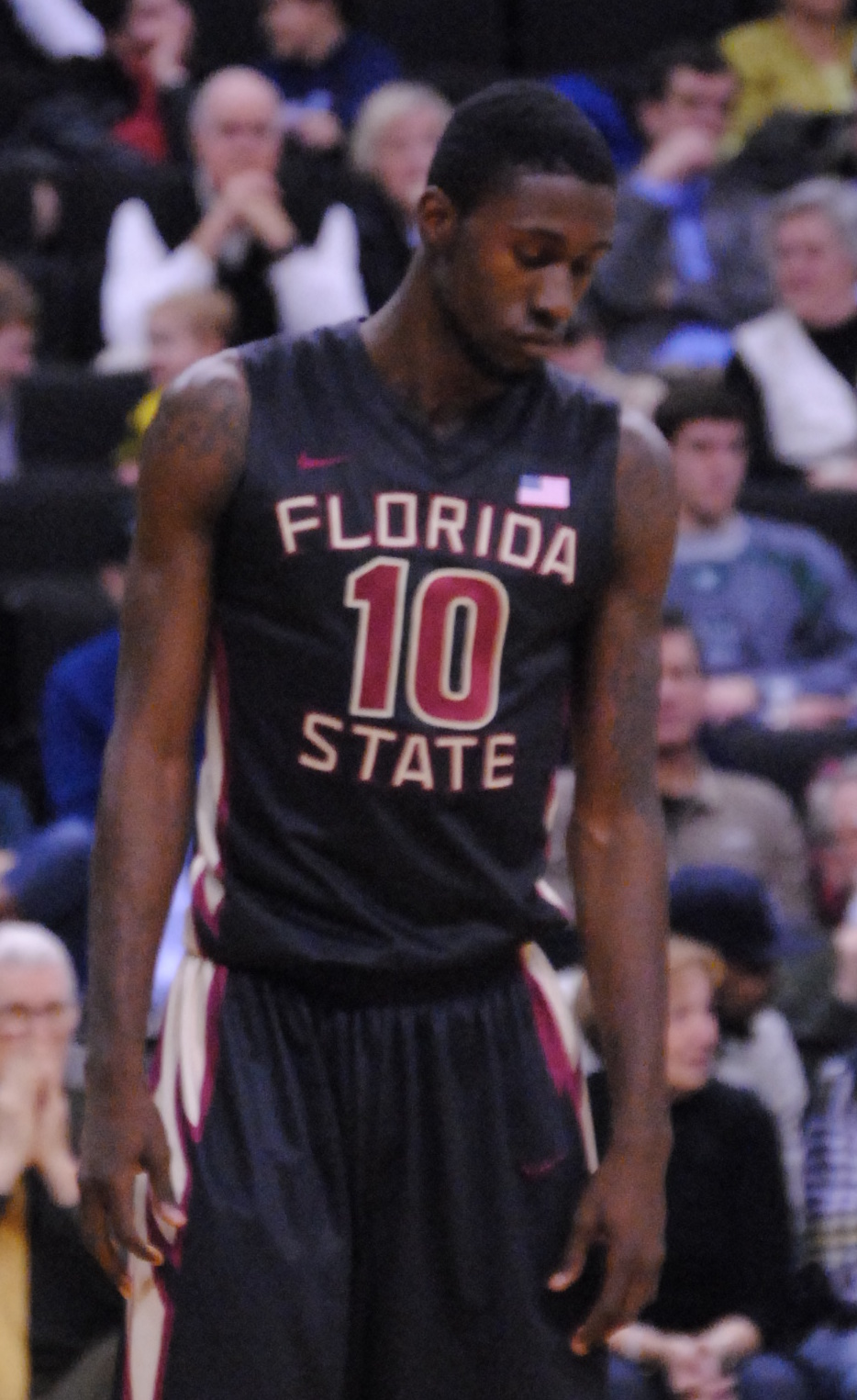
- White with the Florida State Seminoles in 2012

Free agent
- Position: Power forward

Personal information
- Born: August 13, 1992 (age 34) Brooklyn, New York, U.S.
- Listed height: 6 ft 8 in (2.03 m)
- Listed weight: 205 lb (93 kg)

Career information
- High school: Clearwater (Clearwater, Florida)
- College: Florida State (2010–2014)
- NBA draft: 2014: undrafted
- Playing career: 2014–present

Career history
- 2014–2015: Virtus Bologna
- 2015–2016: Aris Thessaloniki
- 2016–2017: Sioux Falls Skyforce
- 2017–2018: Miami Heat
- 2018: Washington Wizards
- 2018: →Capital City Go-Go
- 2019: Long Island Nets
- 2020–2021: UNICS Kazan
- 2021–2022: Panathinaikos
- 2022: Windy City Bulls
- 2023–2024: Lokomotiv Kuban
- 2025: Zenit Saint Petersburg

Career highlights
- NBA D-League All-Star (2017); Greek Super Cup winner (2021); All-Greek League Team (2016); Greek League Most Spectacular Player (2016); ACC All-Defensive Team (2014)
- Stats at NBA.com
- Stats at Basketball Reference

Okaro Wayne Anthony White (born August 13, 1992) is an American professional basketball player who most recently played for Zenit Saint Petersburg of the VTB United League. He played college basketball for the Florida State Seminoles and went on to play three season in the National Basketball Association (NBA).

With Florida State, White was named to the ACC All-Defensive Team during his senior season. He went undrafted in the 2014 NBA draft and made his NBA debut with the Miami Heat in 2017. Despite never appearing in a game for them, White was part of the Cleveland Cavaliers team that reached the 2018 NBA Finals.

== Early life ==
White was born in Brooklyn, New York, on August 13, 1992, and has an older brother and sister. His mother, Charmaine White, ran track for the Jamaica national team. As a preteen, his family moved to Clearwater, Florida, to be close to his grandmother.

In eighth grade, he experienced a growth spurt, growing five-and-a-half inches in the summer.

White was named Pinellas County's Basketball Player of the Year as a senior at Clearwater High School.

== College career ==
White chose to play college basketball at Florida State after receiving scholarship offers from Florida, Georgia Tech, Indiana, Clemson, and Miami (Fl.). At Florida State, he started on two NCAA Tournament teams. He averaged 13.6 points and 6.8 rebounds per game in his senior season with Florida State, both career highs. In addition, White connected on 37.5 percent of his 3-point shots. He defended both guards and forwards and alternated between the small and power forward positions. White was one of 64 seniors selected to play in the Portsmouth Invitational Tournament.

== Professional career ==
=== Virtus Bologna (2014–2015) ===
After going undrafted in the 2014 NBA draft, White joined the Memphis Grizzlies for the 2014 NBA Summer League. In five games, he averaged 8.2 points and 2.6 rebounds per game. On July 31, 2014, he signed with Virtus Bologna of Italy for the 2014–15 season. In 33 games for the club, he averaged 12.1 points, 6.8 rebounds, 1.1 assists and 1.0 blocks per game in the top-tier Italian League.

=== Aris Thessaloniki (2015–2016) ===
In July 2015, White joined the Memphis Grizzlies for the Orlando Summer League and the Dallas Mavericks for the Las Vegas Summer League. On August 7, 2015, he signed a one-year deal with Aris Thessaloniki of the Greek Basket League and the EuroCup. In 26 Greek League regular season games, he averaged 13.5 points, 7.0 rebounds, 1.9 assists, 1.7 steals, and 0.4 blocks per game. He led the Greek League's regular season phase with a total accumulated Performance Index Rating (PIR) of 474, thus being the league's regular season PIR leader.

In 10 Greek League playoff games, he averaged 14.9 points, 8.1 rebounds, 0.8 assists, 1.3 steals, and 1.1 blocks per game. Over 36 games in 2015–16, he averaged 13.9 points, 7.3 rebounds, 1.6 assists and 1.6 steals per game. He was named to the 2015–16 Greek League Best Five, and he was named the 2015–16 Greek League Most Spectacular Player. In the 2015–16 EuroCup season, he averaged 11.0 points and 6.4 rebounds in 16 games.

=== Sioux Falls Skyforce (2016–2017) ===
In June 2016, White joined the Miami Heat for the 2016 NBA Summer League. He went on to sign with the Heat on July 15, 2016, but he was waived on October 22, after appearing in six preseason games. On November 1, 2016, he was acquired by the Sioux Falls Skyforce of the NBA Development League as an affiliate player of the Heat.

=== Miami Heat (2017–2018) ===
On January 17, 2017, he returned to the Heat, signing a 10-day contract with the team to help them deal with numerous injuries. Miami had to use an NBA hardship exemption in order to sign him as he made their roster stand at 16, being one player over the allowed limited of 15. He made his NBA debut two days later, recording one rebound in nine minutes off the bench in a 99–95 win over the Dallas Mavericks. He signed a second 10-day contract with the Heat on January 27, and a rest-of-season deal on February 6. On February 16, 2017, he was assigned to the Sioux Falls Skyforce so he could participate in the NBA Development League All-Star game.

On February 8, 2018, the Heat traded White to the Atlanta Hawks in exchange for Luke Babbitt and was later waived.

On March 18, 2018, the Cleveland Cavaliers signed White to a 10-day contract.

On April 7, 2018, the Cleveland Cavaliers signed White for the remainder of the season and was eligible to play in the playoffs. The Cavaliers made it to the 2018 NBA Finals, but lost in four games to the Golden State Warriors.

On August 5, 2018, White was waived by the Cleveland Cavaliers. On September 24, 2018, White was included in the training camp roster for the San Antonio Spurs but was later waived by the Spurs on October 13.

=== Washington Wizards (2018) ===
On November 23, 2018, the Washington Wizards announced that they had signed White, but White was later waived by the Wizards on December 20.

=== Long Island Nets (2019) ===
On January 4, 2019, the Long Island Nets announced that they had acquired White.

=== Unics Kazan (2020–2021) ===
On August 31, 2020, he signed with UNICS Kazan of the VTB United League. He reached the EuroCup finals with the Russian club, averaging 10.1 points and 5.4 rebounds per game.

=== Panathinaikos (2021–2022) ===
On July 14, 2021, White officially signed a two-year (1+1) deal with Panathinaikos of the Greek Basket League and the EuroLeague, returning to Greece under his Kazan coach Dimitris Priftis. In 32 Greek Basket League games, he averaged 11.5 points and 5.3 rebounds, playing around 23 minutes per contest. Additionally, in 29 EuroLeague games, he averaged 8.4 points and 3.7 rebounds, playing around 23 minutes per contest.

=== Windy City Bulls (2022) ===
On October 23, 2022, White joined the Windy City Bulls training camp roster.

== Career statistics ==
Legend
GP	Games played	GS	Games started	MPG	Minutes per game
FG%	Field goal percentage	3P%	3-point field goal percentage	FT%	Free throw percentage
RPG	Rebounds per game	APG	Assists per game	SPG	Steals per game
BPG	Blocks per game	PPG	Points per game	**Bold**	Career high

=== NBA ===
Year	Team	GP	GS	MPG	FG%	3P%	FT%	RPG	APG	SPG	BPG	PPG
2016–17	Miami	**35**	0	**13.5**	.379	.353	**.909**	**2.3**	**.6**	**.3**	**.3**	2.8
2017–18	Miami	6	**4**	13.3	**.438**	**.364**	.667	1.8	.3	.2	.2	**3.3**
2018–19	Washington	3	0	2.0	.000	.000	–	.7	.0	.0	.0	0.0
Career		44	4	12.7	.381	.340	.880	2.2	.5	.3	.3	2.7

=== College ===
Year	Team	GP	GS	MPG	FG%	3P%	FT%	RPG	APG	SPG	BPG	PPG
2010–11	Florida State	34	13	16.5	.444	.265	**.828**	3.1	.5	.7	.4	6.6
2011–12	Florida State	35	12	22.6	.476	.333	.752	4.4	.5	.6	.4	7.7
2012–13	Florida State	34	34	28.9	.511	.313	.815	5.9	.8	**1.0**	**1.1**	12.4
2013–14	Florida State	**36**	**35**	**30.1**	**.514**	**.375**	.798	**6.8**	**.9**	.8	**1.1**	**13.6**
Career		139	94	24.6	.494	.327	.799	5.1	.7	.7	.8	10.1
