= Larissa Neapolis Indoor Arena =

Sports arena in Larissa, Thessaly Region, Greece

- Larissa Neapolis Indoor Hall
- Interactive map of Larissa Neapolis Indoor Arena
- Full name: Larisa Neapolis National Indoor Sporthall
- Location: Larissa, Greece
- Coordinates: 39.61309°N 22.39848°E
- Owner: E.A.K. Larissas
- Operator: General Secretariat of Sports
- Capacity: Basketball: 4,000 (permanent upper-tier seats); 5,500 (with retractable lower-tier seats); Volleyball: 6,500 (with retractable lower-tier seats)
- Surface: Parquet

Construction
- Opened: 1995
- Renovated: 2017

Tenants
- Gymnastikos S. Larissas; AEL 1964; G.S. Olympia Larissa; Larissa

Larissa Neapolis Indoor Arena is an indoor sporting arena located in the city of Larissa, Greece, in the district of Neapolis. The arena is used to host basketball and volleyball games. The arena is a part of the Larissa National Sports Center complex.

The permanent seating capacity of the arena for basketball games is 4,000, using only the permanent upper-tier seats, and 5,500 using the retractable lower-tier bleachers. The seating capacity of the arena for volleyball games is 4,000, using only the permanent upper-tier seats, and 6,500 using the retractable lower-tier bleachers.

== History ==
The arena was opened in 1995. Over the years, it has been used at various times as the home arena of the local basketball teams Gymnastikos S. Larissas, AEL 1964, G.S. Olympia Larissa and Larissa, which all competed in the top-tier level Greek Basket League. It has also been used as the home arena for the women's volleyball team Filathlitikos Larissaikos.

The arena was renovated in 2017.

== Events hosted ==
- FIBA Under-19 World Cup Group Stage: (1995)
- EuroLeague Women Final Four: (1997)
- Greek Cup Final Four: (2003)

== See also ==
- List of indoor arenas in Greece
