= Larisa B.C. =

Greek basketball team

- Leagues: To be determined
- Founded: 1984; 42 years ago
- History: Ermis Agias Larisa B.C. (1984–2019); Larisa B.C. (2019–2022)
- Arena: Larissa Neapolis Indoor Arena
- Capacity: 4,000 (permanent upper-tier seats); 5,500 (with retractable lower-tier seats)
- Location: Larissa, Greece
- Team colors: White and Blue
- President: vacant
- Head coach: vacant
- Team captain: vacant
- Ownership: TBD
- 2021–22 position: Greek League, 4th
- Championships: 1 Greek 4th Division (2016)
- Website: larisabasket.gr
Home	Away	Third

Larisa B.C. (Greek: Λάρισα K.A.E.), or Larisa Basket (alternate spelling: Larissa), is a Greek professional basketball club that is located in Larissa, Greece. It is a part of the G.S. Ermis Agias Larisa (Γ.Σ. Ερμής Αγιάς Λάρισα) multi-sports club. The club's full original name was Gymnastikos Syllogos Agias Ermis Larisa (Γυμναστικός Σύλλογος Επαρχίας Αγιάς Ερμής Λάρισα). The club's official emblem is a seal with Hermes (Ermis) on it, one of the Greek gods. The team's colors are white and blue.

The team most recently competed in the Greek Basket League, the top-tier level of Greek basketball. Their highest position in the league's final standings has been the 4th, achieved during the 2021–2022 campaign, under coach Fotis Takianos. The club's professional future has been in disarray since the departure of owner and president Theodoros Rizoulis in the summer of 2022.

== History ==
Larisa B.C. was originally founded as Ermis Agias Larisa B.C. (Ερμής Αγιάς Λάρισα K.A.E.), in 1984. With the club originally being located in Agia, Larissa (regional unit), Greece. The club won the Greek 4th Division's 3rd Group, during the 2015–16 season, and was thus promoted up to the Greek 3rd Division, for the 2016–17 season. The team was then promoted up to the Greek 2nd Division, for the 2017–18 season.

Ermis Agias Larisa was given a wild card place in the top-tier level Greek Basket League's 2019–20 season. The club then relocated from Agia to Larissa (city), and was renamed to Larisa Basketball Club.

== Arenas ==
Larisa B.C.'s main home arena is the Larissa Neapolis Indoor Arena, which is located in the city of Larissa. The arena has a seating capacity of 4,000 people in the permanent upper tier, and it can be expanded to a capacity of 5,500 people with optional retractable seating added to the lower tier. The club previously played its home games at the small 300 seat Agias Municipal Indoor Sports Center, which is located in Agia.

== Honors and titles ==
=== Domestic competitions ===
- Greek 4th Division 3rd Group Champion: (2015–16)

== Season by season ==
Season	Tier	Division	Pos.	W–L	Greek Cup	European competitions
2015–16	4	C Basket League	1st	20–2		
2016–17	3	B Basket League	3rd	22–8		
2017–18	2	A2 Basket League	9th	15–15		
2018–19	2	A2 Basket League	7th	17–13		

== Roster ==
Larisa B.C. roster
Players	Coaches
Pos. / No. / Nat. / Name / Ht. / Wt. / Age	Head coach: (Greece) vacant; Assistant coach(es): (Greece) vacant; Team Manager: (Greece) vacant; Legend: (C) Team captain; Injured; Roster; Updated: 20 September 2022

== Notable players ==
Note: Flags indicate national team eligibility at FIBA-sanctioned events. Players may hold other non-FIBA nationalities not displayed.

Criteria

To appear in this section a player must have either:

- Set a club record or won an individual award while at the club
- Played at least one official international match for their national team at any time
- Played at least one official NBA match at any time.

- (Greece) Nestoras Kommatos
- (Greece) Dimitris Cheilaris
- (Greece) Ioannis Demertzis
- (Greece) Nikos Kalles
- (Greece) Zois Karampelas
- (Greece) Dimitrios Lolas
- (Greece) Paris Maragkos
- (Greece) Spyros Mourtos
- (Greece) Kostas Papadakis
- (Greece) Vassilis Papadopoulos
- (Greece) Nondas Papantoniou
- (Greece) Tasos Spyropoulos
- (Greece) Michalis Tsairelis
- (Greece) Vangelis Tzolos
- (Greece) Ioannis Vavatsikos
- (Greece) Theodoros Zaras
- (Latvia) Jānis Bērziņš
- (Latvia) Rihards Kuksiks
- (Lithuania) Dovydas Redikas
- (Croatia) Marin Marić
- (Serbia) Stefan Živanović
- (Canada) Johnny Berhanemeskel
- (The Gambia) / (United States) Ousman Krubally
- (United States) Ken Brown
- (United States) Davion Berry
- (United States) Jehyve Floyd
- (United States) Billy Garrett Jr.
- (United States) Wesley Gordon
- (United States) Devonte Green
- (United States) Darnell Harris
- (United States) Anthony Hickey
- (United States) Jalen Hudson
- (United States) Stefan Moody
- (United States) Terell Parks
- (United States) Scottie Reynolds
- (United States) Brandon Rush
- (United States) Jerry Smith
- (United States) Elijah Thomas
- (United States) DeVaughn Washington
- (United States) James Webb III

== Head coaches ==
Head Coach	Years
(Greece) Grigoris Giassaris	2013–2018
(Greece) Stefanos Perkos	2018
(Greece) Ioannis Livanos	2018–2019
(Greece) Kostas Keramidas	2019
(Greece) Vassilis Fragkias	2019
(Greece) Vangelis Angelou	2019–2020
(Greece) Nikos Papanikolopoulos	2020–2021
(Greece) Fotis Takianos	2021–2022
