= 2017–18 AEK B.C. season =

AEK
2017–18 season
- Chairman: Makis Angelopoulos
- Head coach: Sotiris Manolopoulos (1–7); Dragan Šakota (8–26)
- Arena: Nikos Galis Olympic Indoor Hall
- Greek League: 5th
- Greek Cup: Winners
- FIBA Champions League: Winners
Home	Away	BCL

The 2017–18 AEK B.C. season is AEK's 61st season in the top-tier level Greek Basket League. AEK won the Greek basketball cup and Basketball Champions League on that season.

== Transfers 2017–18 ==
=== Players in ===
No.	Pos.	Nat.	Name	Age	Moving from		Type	Ends	Transfer fee	Date	Source
	PG	(Greece)	Vassilis Zarkadoulas	16	AEK U18	(Greece)	From the youth squad	8 years	Free	June 7, 2017	
	PG	(Greece)	Alkis Ioannou	17	Peristeri	(Greece)	From the youth squad	6 years	Free	June 14, 2017	
	SF	(Greece)	Nikos Kamarianos	20	Nea Kifissia	(Greece)	End of loan	–	Free	July 1, 2017	
23	PF	(Greece)	Michalis Kamperidis	23	Rethymno Cretan Kings	(Greece)	End of loan	–	Free	July 1, 2017	
4	PG	(Greece)	Vassilis Xanthopoulos	33	Aris	(Greece)	End of contract	2 years	Free	July 5, 2017	
13	G/F	(United States)	Kelsey Barlow	26	Trikala Aries	(Greece)	End of contract	2 years	Free	July 5, 2017	
27	G/F	(Greece)	Nikos Rogkavopoulos	16	Doukas	(Greece)	Transfer	6 years	Undisclosed	July 13, 2017	
2	G/F	(United States)	Mike Green	32	Pınar Karşıyaka	(Turkey)	End of contract	1 year	Free	August 2, 2017	
16	SF	(Greece)	Ioannis Agravanis	18	Doukas	(Greece)	Transfer	5 years	Undisclosed	August 9, 2017	
1	F	(United States)	Delroy James	30	Best Balıkesir	(Turkey)	End of contract	1 year	Free	August 9, 2017	
3	G	(United States)	Manny Harris	27	Anhui Wenyi	(China)	End of contract	1 year	Free	August 12, 2017	
0	C	(Nigeria)	Chinemelu Elonu	30	Capitanes de Arecibo	(Puerto Rico)	End of contract	1 year	Free	August 18, 2017	
	SF	(United States)	Cleanthony Early	26	Santa Cruz Warriors	(United States)	End of contract	1 year	Free	September 2, 2017	
	G	(Greece)	Stergios Prapas	15	Aris	(Greece)	End of contract	8 years	Free	September 4, 2017	
35	F	(France)	Bandja Sy	27	ASVEL Basket	(France)	End of contract	1 year	Free	September 15, 2017	
24	C	(Greece)	Vassilis Kavvadas	25	Aris	(Greece)	End of contract	1 year	Free	November 24, 2017	
8	F	(Greece)	Panagiotis Vasilopoulos	33	Aris	(Greece)	Transfer	6 months	€15,000	January 19, 2018	
32	C	(United States)	Vince Hunter	23	Memphis Hustle	(United States)	End of contract	6 months	Free	January 22, 2018	
0	G	(United States)	Kevin Punter	24	Rosa Radom	(Poland)	Transfer	5 months	Undisclosed	February 10, 2018	

=== Players out ===
No.	Pos.	Nat.	Name	Age	Moving to		Type	Transfer fee	Date	Source
4	C	(Nigeria)	Chinemelu Elonu	30	Capitanes de Arecibo	(Puerto Rico)	Expired contract	Free	June 5, 2017	
18	SF	(Australia)	Brad Newley	32	Sydney Kings	(Australia)	Expired contract	Free	July 1, 2017	
1	G	(Croatia)	Roko Ukić	32	Cedevita	(Croatia)	Expired contract	Free	July 1, 2017	
3	G	(Republic of Ireland)	Donnie McGrath	33	Real Betis Energía Plus	(Spain)	Expired contract	Free	July 1, 2017	
9	C	(Greece)	Dimitrios Charitopoulos	33	Iraklis Thessaloniki	(Greece)	Expired contract	Free	July 1, 2017	
32	C	(Greece)	Loukas Mavrokefalidis	32	Lietuvos Rytas	(Lithuania)	Expired contract	Free	July 1, 2017	
8	F	(Bosnia and Herzegovina)	Milan Milošević	31	Promitheas Patras	(Greece)	Expired contract	Free	July 1, 2017	
31	G/F	(Greece)	Nick Paulos	25	Psychiko	(Greece)	Expired contract	Free	July 1, 2017	
	SG	(Canada)	Philip Scrubb	24	Skyliners Frankfurt	(Germany)	Expired contract	Free	July 1, 2017	
20	PG	(Montenegro)	Nikola Ivanović	23	Budućnost Podgorica	(Montenegro)	Contract terminated	Free	July 13, 2017	
7	G/F	(Greece)	Kostas Vasileiadis	33	Trikala Aries	(Greece)	Contract terminated	Free	July 24, 2017	
11	G	(Georgia (country))	Michael Dixon	26	SIG Strasbourg	(France)	Transfer	Undisclosed	August 5, 2017	
24	SF	(Greece)	Dionysis Skoulidas	20	Koroivos	(Greece)	Loan	Free	September 3, 2017	
	SF	(United States)	Cleanthony Early	26	Santa Cruz Warriors	(United States)	Contract terminated	Free	September 9, 2017	
	F	(Greece)	Nikos Kamarianos	20	Nea Kifissia	(Greece)	Contract terminated	Free	September 12, 2017	
7	C	(Greece)	Georgios Tsalmpouris	21	Kolossos H Hotels	(Greece)	Loan	Free	November 24, 2017	
35	F	(France)	Bandja Sy	27	Partizan	(Serbia)	Contract terminated	Free	January 17, 2018	
13	G/F	(United States)	Kelsey Barlow	27	Free agent		Contract terminated	Free	March 6, 2018	

== Preseason and friendlies ==
Win Loss

9 September 2017 1	AEK (Greece)	90–85	(Germany) medi bayreuth	Charleroi
13:00 (EET)	Scoring by quarter: 21-22, 21-18, 26-13, 22-32
	Pts: Barlow 22		Pts: Brooks 18	Arena: RTL Spiroudome

10 September 2017 2	Proximus Spirou (Belgium)	91–98	(Greece) AEK	Charleroi
16:30 (EET)	Scoring by quarter: 18-31, 20-23, 26-19, 27-25
	Pts: Gibbs 17		Pts: Barlow 22	Arena: RTL Spiroudome

13 September 2017 3	AEK (Greece)	78–69	(Russia) CSKA Moscow	Athens
20:00 (EET)	Scoring by quarter: 23-16, 20-13, 17-16, 18-24
	Pts: Šakota 14		Pts: Higgins 15	Arena: Nikos Galis Olympic Indoor Hall; Referees: Schinas, Somos, Manos

15 September 2017 4	AEK (Greece)	100–97	(Germany) Basketball Löwen Braunschweig	Würzburg
16:00 (EET)	Scoring by quarter: 21-22, 26-14, 27-28, 26-33
	Pts: Barlow 25		Pts: Eatherton 18	Arena: s.Oliver Arena

16 September 2017 5	s.Oliver Würzburg (Germany)	85–87	(Greece) AEK	Würzburg
20:00 (EET)	Scoring by quarter: 26-24, 26-24, 15-14, 18-25
	Pts: Olisevičius 22		Pts: Green 17	Arena: s.Oliver Arena

19 September 2017 6	AEK (Greece)	88–85	(Russia) UNICS	Athens
19:30 (EET)	Scoring by quarter: 16-18, 24-24, 22-25, 26-18
Cosmote Sport 4HD	Pts: Green 18		Pts: Colom 21	Arena: Nikos Galis Olympic Indoor Hall; Referees: Anastopoulos, Manos, Psarianos

22 September 2017 7	AEK (Greece)	109–71	(Cyprus) AEK Larnaca	Nicosia
18:30 (EET)	Scoring by quarter: 34-25, 23-24, 26-13, 26-9
	Pts: Larentzakis 16		Pts: Searcy 16	Arena: Eleftheria Indoor Hall

23 September 2017 8	AEK (Greece)	93–82	(Greece) Rethymno Cretan Kings	Nicosia
17:00 (EET)	Scoring by quarter: 14-18, 23-26, 25-26, 31-12
	Pts: Mavroeidis 19		Pts: Moody 19	Arena: Eleftheria Indoor Hall

24 September 2017 9	APOEL (Cyprus)	73–108	(Greece) AEK	Nicosia
16:30 (EET)	Scoring by quarter: 18-25, 20-25, 21-30, 14-28
	Pts: Baker 19		Pts: Šakota 20	Arena: Eleftheria Indoor Hall

23 April 2018 10	AEK (Greece)	vs.	(Greece) Lavrio	Athens
17:00 (EET)
				Arena: Nikos Galis Olympic Indoor Hall

== Competitions ==
=== Overall ===
Competition	Started round	Current position / round	Final position / round	First match	Last match
Greek Basket League	Matchday 1	—	5th	7 October 2017	19 May 2018
Greek Cup	Quarterfinals	—	Winners	4 October 2017	17 February 2018
Champions League	Matchday 1	—	Winners	10 October 2017	6 May 2018

Updated to match played March 9, 2019
Source: Competitions

=== Overview ===
Competition	Record							
Competition	Pld	W	D	L	PF	PA	PD	Win %
Greek Basket League	28	15	0	13	2,244	2,202	+42	53.57
Greek Cup	3	3	0	0	253	219	+34	100.00
Champions League	20	12	1	7	1,668	1,611	+57	60.00
Total	51	30	1	20	4,165	4,032	+133	58.82

Last updated: June 8, 2019
Source: Competitions

=== Greek League ===
==== League table ====
Pos	Team	Pld	W	L	PF	PA	PD	Pts	Qualification or relegation
1	Panathinaikos Superfoods	26	26	0	2404	1777	+627	52	Advanced to playoffs
2	Olympiacos	26	22	4	2245	1781	+464	48	Advanced to playoffs
3	Promitheas Patras	26	17	9	2081	2013	+68	43	Advanced to playoffs
4	PAOK	26	17	9	2063	1975	+88	43	Advanced to playoffs
5	AEK	26	15	11	2082	2031	+51	41	Advanced to playoffs
6	Lavrio Megabolt	26	14	12	2149	2110	+39	40	Advanced to playoffs
7	Kymis	26	14	12	2026	2032	−6	40	Advanced to playoffs
8	Kolossos H Hotels	26	11	15	1934	1977	−43	37	Advanced to playoffs
9	Aris	26	10	16	1754	1869	−115	36	
10	Rethymno Cretan Kings	26	10	16	2047	2136	−89	36	
11	Gymnastikos Larissas Faros	26	8	18	1927	2190	−263	34	
12	Panionios	26	7	19	1876	2078	−202	33	
13	Koroivos (R)	26	7	19	1824	2082	−258	33	Relegated to Greek A2 League
14	Trikala Aries (R)	26	4	22	1802	2163	−361	30	Relegated to Greek A2 League

Source: ESAKE
(R) Relegated

==== Results summary ====
Overall						Home					Away				
Pld	W	L	PF	PA	PD	W	L	PF	PA	PD	W	L	PF	PA	PD
26	15	11	2082	2031	+51	10	3	1080	976	+104	5	8	1002	1055	−53

Last updated: March 9, 2019.
Source: Competitive matches

==== Results by round ====
Round	1	2	3	4	5	6	7	8	9	10	11	12	13	14	15	16	17	18	19	20	21	22	23	24	25	26
Ground	H	A	H	A	H	H	A	H	A	H	A	H	A	A	H	A	H	A	A	H	A	H	A	H	A	H
Result	W	L	W	L	W	W	L	W	L	W	L	L	W	W	W	W	W	W	L	W	L	L	W	L	L	W
Position	3	5	5	5	4	4	5	5	7	6	7	7	7	5	5	5	4	4	5	5	6	7	5	5	5	5

Updated to match(es) played on April 14, 2018. Source: Competitive matches
A = Away; H = Home; W = Win; D = Draw; L = Loss

==== Regular season ====
Win Loss

7 October 2017 1	AEK	91–72	Trikala Aries	Athens
17:00 (EET)	Scoring by quarter: 17-17, 25-10, 21-21, 28-24
Cosmote Sport 4HD	Pts: Šakota 16; Rebs: Elonu 10; Asts: Green, Xanthopoulos 4 PIR: Mavroeidis 23	Boxscore	Pts: Murray Jr. 25; Rebs: Facey 7 Asts: Jones 6 PIR: Murray Jr. 21	Arena: Nikos Galis Olympic Indoor Hall; Referees: Tsaroucha, Psarianos, Symeonidis

14 October 2017 2	Aris	64–62	AEK	Thessaloniki
17:00 (EET)	Scoring by quarter: 10-15, 17-19, 21-13, 16-15
ERT1	Pts: Benson 12; Rebs: Benson 9 Asts: Athinaiou 5 PIR: Benson 16	Boxscore	Pts: Green 17; Rebs: James 7 Asts: Xanthopoulos 5 PIR: Green 18	Arena: Alexandreio Melathron Nick Galis Hall; Referees: Manos, Poursanidis, Bitis

21 October 2017 3	AEK	81–74	Rethymno Cretan Kings	Athens
17:00 (EET)	Scoring by quarter: 17-12, 20-18, 19-31, 25-13
Cosmote Sport 4HD	Pts: Šakota 23; Rebs: Green 6 Asts: Green 6 PIR: Šakota 26	Boxscore	Pts: Moody 17; Rebs: Robertson 9 Asts: Robertson, Moody, Christodoulou 3 PIR: Robertson 22	Arena: Nikos Galis Olympic Indoor Hall; Referees: Deslis, Pantelidis, Zacharis

28 October 2017 4	Kolossos H Hotels	82–78	AEK	Rhodes
16:30 (EET)	Scoring by quarter: 23-19, 20-25, 22-13, 17-21
ERT1 BL Show	Pts: Griffin 22; Rebs: Georgallis 7 Asts: Prostran 6 PIR: Griffin 27	Boxscore	Pts: Green 18; Rebs: James 5 Asts: Green 4 PIR: Green 17	Arena: Venetokleio Indoor Hall; Referees: Manos, Stamatopoulos, Anastopoulos

11 November 2017 5	AEK	86–60	Koroivos	Athens
17:00 (EET)	Scoring by quarter: 26-19, 25-16, 14-16, 21-9
Cosmote Sport 4HD	Pts: Barlow 14; Rebs: Mavroeidis 7 Asts: Larentzakis, Green, James 3 PIR: Elonu 19	Boxscore	Pts: Carson, DeCosey 12; Rebs: Hines 8 Asts: Carson 3 PIR: DeCosey, Skoulidas 12	Arena: Nikos Galis Olympic Indoor Hall; Referees: Bitis, Pantelidis, Pitsilkas

18 November 2017 6	AEK	83–73	Panionios	Athens
17:00 (EET)	Scoring by quarter: 21-27, 25-23, 19-12, 18-11
Cosmote Sport 4HD	Pts: Harris 19; Rebs: Mavroeidis 7 Asts: Green 5 PIR: Harris 21	Boxscore	Pts: Kravić 20; Rebs: Kravić 8 Asts: Dallo 7 PIR: Kravić 23	Arena: Nikos Galis Olympic Indoor Hall; Referees: Manos, Malamas, Kardaris

3 December 2017 7	Lavrio Megabolt	80–72	AEK	Laurium
17:00 (EET)	Scoring by quarter: 23-18, 13-14, 22-16, 22-24
ERT1	Pts: Moore 20; Rebs: Wiggins 12; Asts: Moore 4 PIR: Moore, Wiggins 26	Boxscore	Pts: Šakota 13; Rebs: Mavroeidis, Šakota 6 Asts: Green 6 PIR: Šakota 16	Arena: Lavrio Indoor Hall; Referees: Somos, Panagiotou, Anastopoulos

10 December 2017 8	AEK	66–62	Olympiacos	Athens
19:00 (EET)	Scoring by quarter: 22-12, 17-25, 12-13, 15-12
Cosmote Sport 4HD	Pts: Harris 15; Rebs: Harris 9 Asts: Green 5 PIR: Green 22	Boxscore	Pts: McLean 16; Rebs: McLean 12; Asts: Spanoulis, Mantzaris 4 PIR: McLean 31	Arena: Nikos Galis Olympic Indoor Hall; Referees: Schinas, Manos, Andrikopoulos

16 December 2017 9	PAOK	86–65	AEK	Thessaloniki
16:30 (EET)	Scoring by quarter: 29-19, 16-17, 23-15, 18-14
ERT1	Pts: Goss, Chrysikopoulos 18; Rebs: Klassen 11; Asts: Goss 4 PIR: Goss 19	Boxscore	Pts: Kavvadas 16; Rebs: Šakota, Harris, Kavvadas 6 Asts: Larentzakis, Green 3 PIR: Kavvadas 24	Arena: P.A.O.K. Sports Arena; Referees: Piloidis, Diamantis, Stamatopoulos

30 December 2017 10	AEK	106–79	Gymnastikos Larissas Faros	Athens
17:00 (EET)	Scoring by quarter: 34-22, 24-10, 27-27, 21-20
Cosmote Sport 4HD	Pts: Harris 19; Rebs: Harris 7 Asts: Barlow 6 PIR: Harris 26	Boxscore	Pts: Maragkos 29; Rebs: Mouratos 7 Asts: Papantoniou, Mouratos 5 PIR: Maragkos 28	Arena: Nikos Galis Olympic Indoor Hall; Referees: Manos, Bikas, Tzima

6 January 2018 11	Promitheas Patras	69–66	AEK	Patras
18:30 (EET)
ERT1		Boxscore		Arena: Dimitris Tofalos Arena; Referees: Karakatsounis, Tsaroucha, Pantelidis

14 January 2018 12	AEK	74–94	Panathinaikos Superfoods	Athens
16:30 (EET)
Cosmote Sport 4HD		Boxscore		Arena: Nikos Galis Olympic Indoor Hall; Referees: Anastopoulos, Manos, Tzafleris

20 January 2018 13	Kymis	77–79	AEK	Kymi
16:30 (EET)
ERT1 BL Show		Boxscore		Arena: Tasos Kabouris Hall; Referees: Karakatsounis, Diamantis, Malamas

27 January 2018 14	Trikala Aries	71–82	AEK	Trikala
16:30 (EET)
ERT1 BL Show		Boxscore		Arena: Trikala Municipal Sports Hall; Referees: Manos, Psarianos, Kardaris

3 February 2018 15	AEK	73–64	Aris	Athens
17:00 (EET)
Cosmote Sport 4HD		Boxscore		Arena: Nikos Galis Olympic Indoor Hall; Referees: Panagiotou, Katrachouras, Konstantinopoulos

13 February 2018 16	Rethymno Cretan Kings	90–95	AEK	Rethymno
15:30 (EET)
ERT1		Boxscore		Arena: Melina Merkouri Indoor Hall; Referees: Somos, Maglogiannis, Pantelidis

3 March 2018 17	AEK	95–79	Kolossos H Hotels	Athens
17:00 (EET)
Cosmote Sport 4HD		Boxscore		Arena: Nikos Galis Olympic Indoor Hall; Referees: Koromilas, Bitis, Anastopoulos

10 March 2018 18	Koroivos	75–77	AEK	Amaliada
16:30 (EET)
ERT1 BL Show		Boxscore		Arena: Amaliada Indoor Hall; Referees: Poursanidis, Maglogiannis, Chalabalakis

18 March 2018 19	Panionios	71–69	AEK	Nea Smyrni
17:00 (EET)
ERT1		Boxscore		Arena: Nea Smyrni Indoor Hall; Referees: Anastopoulos, Psarianos, Malamas

24 March 2018 20	AEK	96–86	Lavrio Megabolt	Athens
17:00 (EET)
Cosmote Sport 4HD		Boxscore		Arena: Nikos Galis Olympic Indoor Hall; Referees: Piloidis, Andrikopoulos, Tzafleris

1 April 2018 21	Olympiacos	100–86	AEK	Piraeus
19:30 (EET)
Cosmote Sport 4HD		Boxscore		Arena: Peace and Friendship Stadium; Referees: Anastopoulos, Karakatsounis, Tsaroucha

11 April 2018 22	AEK	72–81	PAOK	Athens
17:00 (EET)
Cosmote Sport 4HD		Boxscore		Arena: Nikos Galis Olympic Indoor Hall; Referees: Schinas, Somos, Poursanidis

14 April 2018 23	Gymnastikos Larissas Faros	75–86	AEK	Larissa
18:30 (EET)
ERT1		Boxscore		Arena: Larissa Neapolis Indoor Arena; Referees: Anastopoulos, Pantelidis, Pafilis

28 April 2018 24	AEK	75–76	Promitheas Patras	Athens
19:00 (EET)
Cosmote Sport 4HD		Boxscore		Arena: Nikos Galis Olympic Indoor Hall

11 May 2018 25	Panathinaikos Superfoods	115–85	AEK	Athens
20:00 (EET)
Cosmote Sport 4HD		Boxscore		Arena: Nikos Galis Olympic Indoor Hall

13 May 2018 26	AEK	82–76	Kymis	Athens
17:00 (EET)
Cosmote Sport 4HD		Boxscore		Arena: Nikos Galis Olympic Indoor Hall

==== Results overview ====
Win Loss

Opposition	Home score	Away score	Double
Aris	73–64	64–62	135–128
Gymnastikos Larissas Faros	106–79	75–86	192–154
Kolossos H Hotels	95–79	82–78	173–161
Koroivos	86–60	75–77	163–135
Kymis	82–76	77–79	161–153
Lavrio Megabolt	96–86	80–72	168–166
Olympiacos	66–62	100–86	152–162
Panathinaikos Superfoods	74–94	115–85	159–209
Panionios	83–73	71–69	152–144
PAOK	72–81	86–65	137–167
Promitheas Patras	75-76	69–66	141-145
Rethymno Cretan Kings	81–74	90–95	176–164
Trikala Aries	91–72	71–82	173–143

==== Quarterfinals ====
Win Loss

16 May 2018 1st Round	PAOK	78–74	AEK	Thessaloniki
18:00 (EET)
		Boxscore		Arena: Sports Arena

19 May 2018 2nd Round	AEK	88–93	PAOK	Athens
16:00 (EET)
		Boxscore		Arena: Olympic Indoor Hall

=== Greek Cup ===
Win Loss

Quarterfinals

4 October 2017 Quarterfinal	AEK	92–67	Rethymno Cretan Kings	Athens
17:00 (EET)	Scoring by quarter: 29-13, 15-25, 28-17, 20-12
	Pts: Barlow 16; Rebs: James 10; Asts: Green 6		Pts: Moody 25; Rebs: Daniels 5 Asts: Medlock 4	Arena: Nikos Galis Olympic Indoor Hall; Referees: Karakatsounis, Panagiotou, Zacharis

Semifinals

5 November 2017 Semifinal	AEK	73–69	Panathinaikos Superfoods	Athens
16:00 (EET)	Scoring by quarter: 17-18, 15-10, 10-16, 31-25
ERT1	Pts: Harris 20; Rebs: Elonu 14; Asts: Green 5 PIR: Elonu 22		Pts: Pappas 14; Rebs: Vougioukas 12; Asts: Calathes 9 PIR: Vougioukas 17	Arena: Nikos Galis Olympic Indoor Hall; Referees: Karakatsounis, Manos, Poursanidis

Final

17 February 2018 Final	Olympiacos	83–88	AEK	Heraklion
ERT1				Arena: Heraklion Indoor Sports Arena; Referees: Schinas, Manos, Poursanidis

=== FIBA Champions League ===
==== Regular season - Group C ====
Pos	Team	Pld	W	L	PF	PA	PD	Pts	Qualification	SIG	BAN	AEK	BAY	EST	VEN	OLI	RAD
1	(France) SIG Strasbourg	14	9	5	1103	1055	+48	23	Advance to round of 16	—	87–72	80–78	77–82	77–74	70–67	83–69	98–81
2	(Turkey) Banvit	14	9	5	1080	1039	+41	23	Advance to round of 16	63–80	—	78–71	85–74	82–80	90–62	87–83	74–64
3	(Greece) AEK Athens	14	8	6	1149	1110	+39	22	Advance to round of 16	87–88	70–74	—	83–81	79–87	84–64	91–73	96–92
4	(Germany) medi bayreuth	14	8	6	1145	1115	+30	22	Advance to round of 16	82–80	76–88	80–73	—	84–90	89–81	78–79	90–85
5	(Spain) Movistar Estudiantes	14	8	6	1117	1076	+41	22	Transfer to FIBA Europe Cup	81–65	78–73	78–85	68–76	—	81–80	75–81	78–68
6	(Italy) Umana Reyer Venezia	14	8	6	1146	1140	+6	22	Transfer to FIBA Europe Cup	78–67	108–101	101–103	70–67	92–91	—	84–67	102–93
7	(Slovenia) Petrol Olimpija	14	4	10	996	1105	−109	18		78–77	57–65	71–80	77–90	57–72	66–76	—	80–72
8	(Poland) Rosa Radom	14	2	12	1032	1128	−96	16		63–74	49–48	63–69	79–96	77–84	71–81	75–58	—

Source: Basketball Champions League
Legend: Blue = home team win; Red = away team win.

==== Results summary ====
Overall						Home					Away				
Pld	W	L	PF	PA	PD	W	L	PF	PA	PD	W	L	PF	PA	PD
14	8	6	1149	1110	+39	4	3	590	559	+31	4	3	559	551	+8

Last updated: May 20, 2019.
Source: tab=round_400000000000000 BCL Group C Results

==== Results by round ====
Round	1	2	3	4	5	6	7	8	9	10	11	12	13	14
Ground	H	A	H	H	A	H	A	A	H	A	A	H	A	H
Result	L	W	L	W	L	W	L	W	W	L	W	L	W	W
Position	6	3	6	6	6	4	5	5	3	4	4	5	5	3

Updated to match(es) played on February 6, 2018. Source: tab=games_and_results BCL Group C Fixtures
A = Away; H = Home; W = Win; D = Draw; L = Loss

==== Regular season ====
Win Loss

10 October 2017 1	AEK Athens (Greece)	79–87	(Spain) Movistar Estudiantes	Athens
19:30 (EET)	Scoring by quarter: 15-31, 23-17, 17-17, 24-22
ERT3	Pts: James 21; Rebs: James 10; Asts: Xanthopoulos 4 PIR: James 23	Boxscore	Pts: Landesberg 28; Rebs: Brown 7 Asts: Cook 9 PIR: Brown 29	Arena: Nikos Galis Olympic Indoor Hall; Referees: Mazzoni (ITA), Bijedić (BIH), Stoica (ROU)

17 October 2017 2	Umana Reyer Venezia (Italy)	101–103(OT)	(Greece) AEK Athens	Venice
21:30 (EET)	Scoring by quarter: 21-15, 17-19, 26-26, 21-25, Overtime: 16-18
NovaSports 2HD	Pts: Orelik 25; Rebs: Orelik 10; Asts: Haynes 5 PIR: Orelik 27	Boxscore	Pts: Green 23; Rebs: Mavroeidis 9 Asts: Green, Šakota 4 PIR: Mavroeidis 25	Arena: Palasport Giuseppe Taliercio; Referees: Bulto (ESP), Aunkrogers (LAT), Obradović (BIH)

24 October 2017 3	AEK Athens (Greece)	70–74	(Turkey) Banvit	Athens
19:30 (EET)	Scoring by quarter: 16-23, 17-15, 17-17, 2019
NovaSports 2HD	Pts: Harris 18; Rebs: Harris, Barlow 6 Asts: Harris 4 PIR: Harris 19	Boxscore	Pts: Caloiaro 13; Rebs: Thomas 7 Asts: Caloiaro, Geçim 6 PIR: Caloiaro 23	Arena: Nikos Galis Olympic Indoor Hall; Referees: Zurapović (BIH), Cici (ALB), Conde (ESP)

1 November 2017 4	AEK Athens (Greece)	96–92(OT)	(Poland) Rosa Radom	Athens
19:30 (EET)	Scoring by quarter: 13-20, 23-23, 17-18, 25-17, Overtime: 18-14
NovaSports 2	Pts: Harris, Šakota 18; Rebs: Harris 13; Asts: Green, Xanthopoulos 6 PIR: Harris 29	Boxscore	Pts: Punter 23; Rebs: Sokołowski 11; Asts: Sokołowski 7 PIR: Sokołowski, Zaytsev 23	Arena: Nikos Galis Olympic Indoor Hall; Referees: Sahin (ITA), Maričić (SRB), Vitkauskas (LTU)

7 November 2017 5	SIG Strasbourg (France)	80–78	(Greece) AEK Athens	Strasbourg
21:30 (EET)	Scoring by quarter: 19-11, 20-18, 18-18, 23-31
NovaSports 1	Pts: Wright 26; Rebs: Labeyrie 10; Asts: Logan 4 PIR: Wright 29	Boxscore	Pts: Šakota 19; Rebs: Mavroeidis 7 Asts: James 4 PIR: Šakota, Green 20	Arena: Rhénus Sport; Referees: Jasevicius (LTU), Calatrava (ESP), Krejic (SLO)

15 November 2017 6	AEK Athens (Greece)	91–73	(Slovenia) Petrol Olimpija	Athens
21:30 (EET)	Scoring by quarter: 27-20, 23-19, 22-20, 19-14
NovaSports 1	Pts: Harris 26; Rebs: Mavroeidis 11; Asts: Green 7 PIR: Harris 28	Boxscore	Pts: Morgan 21; Rebs: Morgan 8 Asts: Hrovat 5 PIR: Morgan 25	Arena: Nikos Galis Olympic Indoor Hall; Referees: Bulto (ESP), Castillo (ESP), Ciulin (ROU)

6 December 2017 7	medi bayreuth (Germany)	80–73	(Greece) AEK Athens	Bayreuth
21:00 (EET)	Scoring by quarter: 25-11, 19-24, 16-20, 20-18
NovaSports 2	Pts: York 22; Rebs: Brooks 7 Asts: Linhart 3 PIR: York, Amaize 15	Boxscore	Pts: Harris 22; Rebs: Šakota 8 Asts: James 3 PIR: Šakota 21	Arena: Oberfrankenhalle; Referees: Maestre (FRA), Lucis (LAT), Nikolić (SRB)

12 December 2017 8	Movistar Estudiantes (Spain)	78–85	(Greece) AEK Athens	Madrid
21:30 (EET)	Scoring by quarter: 18-14, 23-20, 15-21, 22-30
ERT3	Pts: Landesberg, Brown 16; Rebs: Vicedo, Suton 7 Asts: Cook 9 PIR: Brown 18	Boxscore	Pts: Šakota 20; Rebs: Harris 9 Asts: Green 8 PIR: Harris 23	Arena: WiZink Center; Referees: Sahin (ITA), Rutesić (MNE), Vitkauskas (LTU)

20 December 2017 9	AEK Athens (Greece)	84–64	(Italy) Umana Reyer Venezia	Athens
21:30 (EET)	Scoring by quarter: 17-11, 25-26, 28-11, 14-16
NovaSports 3	Pts: Green, Mavroeidis 19; Rebs: Mavroeidis 9 Asts: Green 10; PIR: Mavroeidis 27	Boxscore	Pts: Watt 13; Rebs: Watt 14; Asts: Orelik 4 PIR: Watt 26	Arena: Nikos Galis Olympic Indoor Hall; Referees: Conde (ESP), Maričić (SRB), Shulga (UKR)

10 January 2018 10	Banvit (Turkey)	78–71	(Greece) AEK Athens	Bandırma
18:30 (EET)
		Boxscore		Arena: Kara Ali Acar Sport Hall

17 January 2018 11	Rosa Radom (Poland)	63–69	(Greece) AEK Athens	Radom
20:00 (EET)
		Boxscore		Arena: Sports Hall MOSiR

23 January 2018 12	AEK Athens (Greece)	87–88	(France) SIG Strasbourg	Athens
19:30 (EET)
		Boxscore		Arena: Nikos Galis Olympic Indoor Hall

30 January 2018 13	Petrol Olimpija (Slovenia)	71–80	(Greece) AEK Athens	Ljubljana
21:00 (EET)
		Boxscore		Arena: Arena Stožice

6 February 2018 14	AEK Athens (Greece)	83–81	(Germany) medi bayreuth	Athens
19:30 (EET)
		Boxscore		Arena: Nikos Galis Olympic Indoor Hall

==== Results overview ====
Win Loss

Opposition	Home score	Away score	Double
(Turkey) Banvit	70–74	78–71	141–152
(Germany) medi bayreuth	83–81	80–73	156–161
(Spain) Movistar Estudiantes	79–87	78–85	164–165
(Slovenia) Petrol Olimpija	91–73	71–80	171–144
(Poland) Rosa Radom	96–92	63–69	165–155
(France) SIG Strasbourg	87–88	80–78	165–168
(Italy) Umana Reyer Venezia	84–64	101–103	187–165

==== Round of 16 ====
Win Loss

7 March 2018 1 Round	AEK Athens (Greece)	88–98	(Czech Republic) ČEZ Nymburk	Athens
19:30 (EET)	Scoring by quarter: 14-21, 16-25, 27-23, 31-29
NovaSports 2	Pts: Harris 25; Rebs: Harris 6 Asts: Green 9 PIR: Harris 34	Boxscore	Pts: Ray 30; Rebs: Benda 9 Asts: Lawrence 8 PIR: Ray 33	Arena: Nikos Galis Olympic Indoor Hall; Referees: Dozai (CRO), Cmikiewicz (POL), Sahin (ITA)

14 March 2018 2 Round	ČEZ Nymburk (Czech Republic)	82–93 (Series: 180–181)	(Greece) AEK Athens	Nymburk
19:30 (EET)	Scoring by quarter: 21-22, 19-20, 28-22, 14-29
NovaSports 2	Pts: Ray 18; Rebs: Hruban 8 Asts: Lawrence 5 PIR: Hruban 17	Boxscore	Pts: Harris 36; Rebs: Hunter, Green, Punter 4 Asts: Green 6 PIR: Harris 32	Arena: Tipsport Arena; Referees: Mazzoni (ITA), Baldini (ITA), Krejič (SLO)

==== Quarterfinals ====
Win Draw Loss

28 March 2018 1 Round	AEK Athens (Greece)	78–69	(France) SIG Strasbourg	Athens
19:30 (EET)
		Boxscore		Arena: Nikos Galis Olympic Indoor Hall

4 April 2018 2 Round	SIG Strasbourg (France)	83–83 (Series: 152–161)	(Greece) AEK Athens	Strasbourg
21:30 (EET)
		Boxscore		Arena: Rhénus Sport

==== Final Four ====
Win Loss

4 May 2018 Semi-final	AEK Athens (Greece)	77–75	(Spain) UCAM Murcia	Athens
21:30 (EET)
		Boxscore		Arena: Nikos Galis Olympic Indoor Hall

6 May 2018 Final	AS Monaco (France)	94–100	(Greece) AEK Athens	Athens
20:30 (EET)
		Boxscore		Arena: Nikos Galis Olympic Indoor Hall
