= Vassilis Kavvadas =

Greek basketball player (born 1991)

No. 6 – Mykonos
- Position: Center
- League: Greek Basketball League

Personal information
- Born: December 28, 1991 (age 34) Nikaia, Attica, Greece
- Listed height: 6 ft 9.1 in (2.06 m)
- Listed weight: 280 lb (127 kg)

Career information
- NBA draft: 2013: undrafted
- Playing career: 2010–present

Career history
- 2010–2013: Panionios
- 2013–2016: Olympiacos
- 2015–2016: → Arkadikos
- 2016–2017: Aris Thessaloniki
- 2017–2019: AEK Athens
- 2019–2021: Iraklis Thessaloniki
- 2021–2022: Panathinaikos
- 2022–2023: Aris Thessaloniki
- 2023–2024: Lavrio
- 2024: Vikos Falcons
- 2025: Iraklis Thessaloniki
- 2025–present: Mykonos

Career highlights
- FIBA Champions League champion (2018); FIBA Intercontinental Cup champion (2019); Greek League champion (2015); Greek Cup winner (2018); Greek Super Cup winner (2021); Greek League blocks leader (2016); 4× Greek League All-Star (2013, 2014, 2018, 2020)

Vassilis Kavvadas (alternate spellings: Vasilis, Vasileios) (Greek: Βασίλης Καββαδάς; born December 28, 1991) is a Greek professional basketball player and the vice–captain for Mykonos of the Greek Basketball League. He is 2.05 m (6 ft 9 in) tall and he plays at the center position.

== Professional career ==
After playing with Ionikos Nikaias at the youth levels, and in the 3rd-tier level amateur competition Greek C League, Kavvadas began his professional career with the 1st-tier Greek League club Panionios, during the 2010–11 season, after having originally signed with the Greek League club Maroussi. He joined the Greek EuroLeague club Olympiacos in 2013. In 2015, he was loaned by Olympiacos to Arkadikos, for the 2015–16 season.

On July 26, 2016, Kavvadas signed a two-year deal with the Greek team Aris Thessaloniki.

On November 24, 2017, Kavvadas signed with the Greek team AEK Athens for the rest of the 2017–18 season, with an option for renewal for another year. With AEK, he won the Greek Cup title, in 2018.

On July 28, 2019, Kavvadas moved back to Thessaloniki and signed with Iraklis. He averaged 9.1 points and 6.1 rebounds per game. On July 29, 2020, he renewed his contract with the team. He proceeded to average 12.3 points, 8.9 rebounds, and 1.1 blocks per game in 2020–21 Greek Basket League.

On July 31, 2021, Kavvadas signed a two-year (1+1) deal with Greek Basket League champions Panathinaikos. In 20 league games, he averaged 3 points and 1.9 rebounds in 7 minutes per contest. Additionally, in 11 EuroLeague games, he posted an improved 5.3 points and 1.7 rebounds in 11 minutes per contest. His season highlight was a 17 points & 6 rebounds performance at home court against Crvena zvezda on February 25, 2022. On July 19, 2022, Kavvadas amicably parted ways with the historic club.

On August 2, 2022, Kavvadas returned to Aris. In 15 league games, he averaged 5.2 points and 2.5 rebounds in 11 minutes per contest.

On August 16, 2023, Kavvadas signed with Lavrio. On January 29, 2025, Kavvadas signed with Iraklis.

== National team career ==
=== Greek junior national team ===
Kavvadas played at the 2009 FIBA Europe Under-18 Championship, with the Under-18 national team of Greece.

=== Greek senior national team ===
In 2012, Kavvadas was invited to train with the Greece men's national basketball team, for the first time. He played with the Greece men's national team at the EuroBasket 2013 and in the 2020 Olympic Qualifying Tournament in Victoria, Canada, under coach Rick Pitino.

== Career statistics ==
=== Domestic Leagues ===
==== Regular season ====
Legend
GP	Games played	MPG	Minutes per game	FG%	Field goal percentage
3P%	3-point field goal percentage	FT%	Free throw percentage	RPG	Rebounds per game
APG	Assists per game	SPG	Steals per game	BPG	Blocks per game
PPG	Points per game	**Bold**	Career high		Led the league

Note: Only games in the primary domestic competitions are included. Therefore, games in cup or European competitions are left out.

Year	Team	League	GP	MPG	FG%	3P%	FT%	RPG	APG	SPG	BPG	PPG
2016–17	Aris	GBL	18	16.4	.701	–	.500	3.7	.1	.1	.9	9.7
2017–18	A.E.K.	GBL	19	9.0	.741	–	.549	1.9	.2	.1	.5	5.7
2018–19	A.E.K.	GBL	2	5.5	.000	–	1.000	2.0	.5	0	.5	1.0

=== FIBA Champions League ===
†	Denotes seasons in which Vassilis Kavvadas won the FIBA Champions League

Year	Team	GP	MPG	FG%	3P%	FT%	RPG	APG	SPG	BPG	PPG
2016–17	Aris	10	**14.5**	**.667**	–	.559	**3.2**	**.4**	**.3**	**1.7**	**7.9**
2017–18†	A.E.K.	**11**	5.2	.500	–	**.750**	1.2	0	.1	.6	1.6
2018–19	A.E.K.	2	12.2	.429	–	.500	2.5	0	0	0	5.0

== Awards and accomplishments ==
=== Youth level ===
- Greek League Youth All-Star Game Slam Dunk Champion: (2013)

=== Pro career ===
- FIBA Champions League Champion: (2018)
- Greek League Champion: (2015)
- Greek Cup Winner: (2018)
- 4× Greek League All-Star: (2013, 2014, 2018, 2020)
- Greek League blocks leader: (2016)
