= Charis Giannopoulos =

Greek basketball player (born 1989)

Charis Giannopoulos Χάρης Γιαννόπουλος
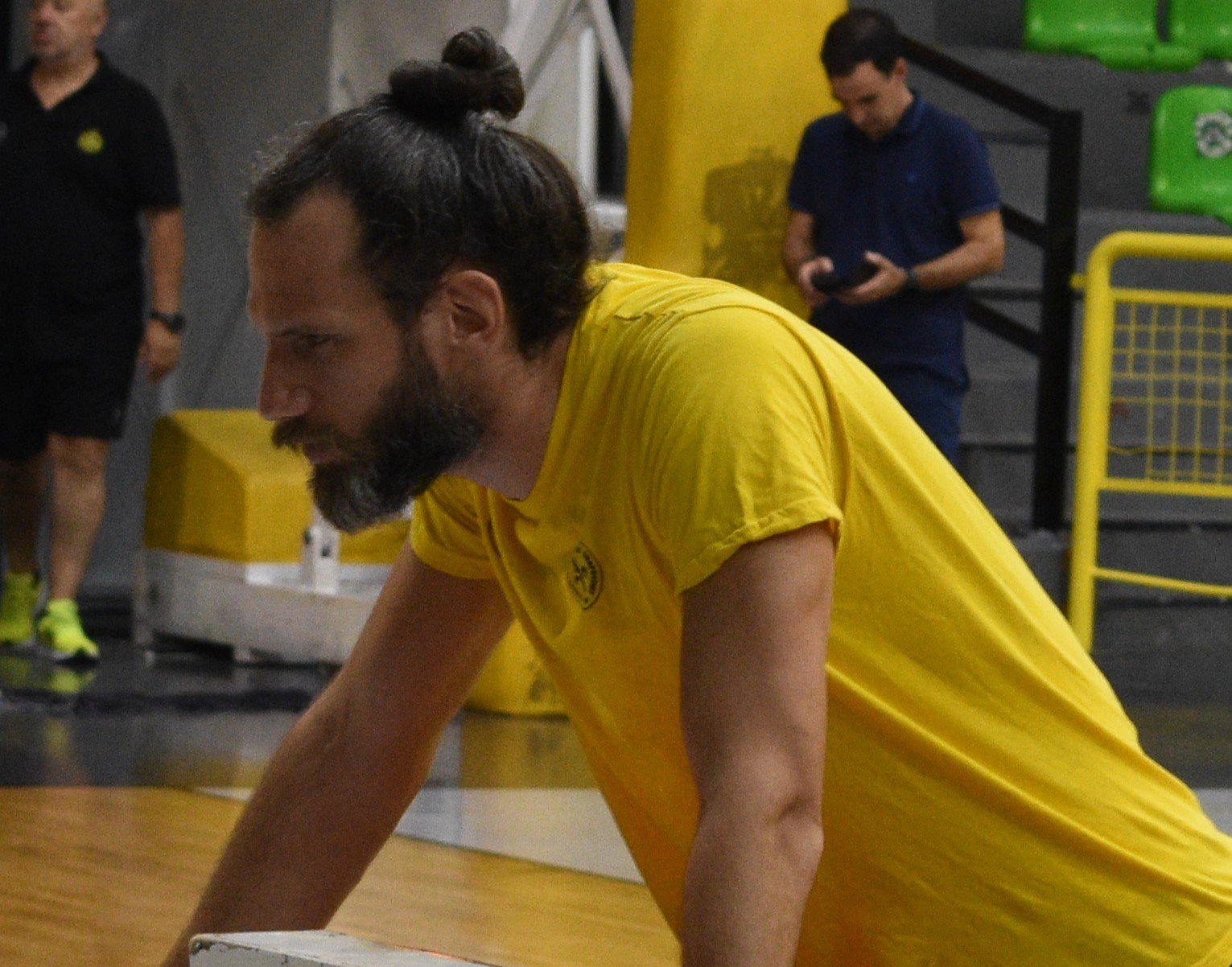
- Giannopoulos in 2023

Personal information
- Born: July 13, 1989 (age 37) Alexandreia Imathias, Greece
- Listed height: 200 cm (6 ft 7 in)
- Listed weight: 210 lb (95 kg)

Career information
- Playing career: 2006–present
- Position: Small forward

Career history
- 2006–2008: PAOK Thessaloniki
- 2008–2009: Olympiacos
- 2009–2011: Panionios
- 2011–2012: Peristeri
- 2012–2013: Panathinaikos
- 2013–2014: Manresa
- 2014–2015: Obradoiro
- 2015–2018: Rethymno Cretan Kings
- 2018–2020: AEK Athens
- 2020–2022: Promitheas Patras
- 2022: Peristeri
- 2022–2023: Kolossos Rodou
- 2023–present: Maroussi

Career highlights
- FIBA Intercontinental Cup champion (2019); Greek League champion (2013); 2× Greek Cup winner (2013, 2020); Greek Super Cup winner (2020); 2× Greek League All-Star (2020, 2022)
Medals
Men's basketball
Representing Greece
FIBA Europe Under-20 Championship
Gold medal – first place	2009 Greece	U-20 Team
FIBA Europe Under-18 Championship
Silver medal – second place	2007 Spain	U-18 Team

Charalampos "Charis" Giannopoulos (Greek: Χαράλαμπος "Χάρης" Γιαννόπουλος; born July 13, 1989) is a Greek former basketball player. He is a 2.01 m (6 ft 7 in) tall small forward.

== Professional career ==
Giannopoulos began his pro career with the Greek League club PAOK Thessaloniki, during the 2005–06 season. He joined the Greek club Olympiacos Piraeus in 2008. He moved to Panionios for 2 seasons, from 2009 to 2011. He joined Peristeri for the 2011–12 season. He then moved to Panathinaikos for the 2012–13 season.

In 2013, he signed with the Spanish League club Bàsquet Manresa. In 2015, Giannopoulos returned to Greece, signing with Rethymno Cretan Kings. On July 10, 2017, Giannopoulos renewed his contract with the Cretan team through 2020, and also became the club's team captain.

In 2018, Giannopoulos signed with AEK Athens of the Greek Basket League. He parted ways with the team on June 21, 2020. During his stint with AEK, Giannopoulos won the 2019 FIBA Intercontinental Cup as well as the 2020 Greek Cup.

On July 28, 2020, Giannopoulos moved to Promitheas Patras. In 27 games during his first season, he averaged 8.7 points, 3.7 rebounds and 1 assist per contest. On March 23, 2022, he parted ways with the club, after an injury-plagued second season, where he appeared in only 9 games and averaged 7.4 points, 2.1 rebounds and 1.2 assists per contest.

On April 8, 2022, despite an initial agreement with AEK Athens, Giannopoulos returned to another former club of his, Peristeri, for the rest of the season. In 2 regular season games, he received limited playing time, while never appearing on court in the team's two playoff matches against Olympiacos.

On August 17, 2022, Giannopoulos moved to Kolossos Rodou and was named team captain due to his experience. In 20 games, he averaged 10.5 points and 4.7 rebounds, playing around 28 minutes per contest.

On August 9, 2023, Giannopoulos signed with the newly promoted Maroussi. On July 5, 2025, it was announced that Giannopoulos will remain with the club until 2026. He became the captain of the team for the 2025–26 season. He announced his retirement on 2026 after 20 seasons.

== National team career ==
=== Greek junior national team ===
With Greece's junior national teams, Giannopoulos played at the 2005 FIBA Europe Under-16 Championship and the 2006 FIBA Europe Under-18 Championship. He won the silver medal at the 2007 FIBA Europe Under-18 Championship. He also played at the 2008 FIBA Europe Under-20 Championship, and won the gold medal at the 2009 FIBA Europe Under-20 Championship.

=== Greek senior national team ===
Giannopoulos became a member of the senior men's Greek national basketball team in 2017. He played at the 2019 FIBA World Cup qualification.

== Career statistics ==
=== Domestic Leagues ===
==== Regular season ====
Legend
GP	Games played	MPG	Minutes per game	FG%	Field goal percentage
3P%	3-point field goal percentage	FT%	Free throw percentage	RPG	Rebounds per game
APG	Assists per game	SPG	Steals per game	BPG	Blocks per game
PPG	Points per game	**Bold**	Career high		Led the league

Note: Only games in the primary domestic competitions are included. Therefore, games in cup or European competitions are left out.

Year	Team	League	GP	MPG	FG%	3P%	FT%	RPG	APG	SPG	BPG	PPG
2016–17	Rethymno Cretan Kings	GBL	25	**27.2**	**.464**	**.398**	.889	**3.9**	**1.5**	.6	.1	10.4
2017–18	Rethymno Cretan Kings	GBL	**26**	26.0	.366	.378	**.938**	3.0	1.4	**.7**	**.2**	**10.9**
2018–19	A.E.K.	GBL	21	12.4	.398	.375	.692	1.4	.4	.5	.1	4.6

=== FIBA Champions League ===
Year	Team	GP	MPG	FG%	3P%	FT%	RPG	APG	SPG	BPG	PPG
2018–19	A.E.K.	16	8.0	.333	.227	.778	1.5	.1	.1	.1	2.3

== Honours ==
- Greek Basketball Super Cup: (2020)
