= 2018–19 AEK B.C. season =

AEK
2018–19 season
- Chairman: Makis Angelopoulos
- Head coach: Luca Banchi
- Arena: Nikos Galis Olympic Indoor Hall
- Greek League: 3rd
- Greek Cup: Quarter-finals
- Champions League: Quarter-finals
- Intercontinental Cup: Winners
Home	Away	BCL

The 2018–19 AEK B.C. season is AEK's 62nd season in the top-tier level Greek Basket League. AEK competed in four different competitions during that season.

== Transfers 2018–19 ==
=== Players In ===
No.	Pos.	Nat.	Name	Age	Moving from		Type	Ends	Transfer fee	Date	Source
31	SF	(Greece)	Charis Giannopoulos	29	Rethymno Cretan Kings	(Greece)			Free	June 23, 2018	
23	PG	(United States)	Malcolm Griffin	27	Zenit Saint Petersburg	(Russia)			Free	July 17, 2018	
30	PF	(United States)	Tyler Roberson	23	Agua Caliente Clippers	(United States)			Free	July 26, 2018	
11	SG	(Canada)	Xavier Rathan-Mayes	24	Westchester Knicks	(United States)			Free	July 28, 2018	
26	SF	(Cuba)	Howard Sant-Roos	27	Darüşşafaka	(Turkey)			Free	August 3, 2018	
8	SF	(Lithuania)	Jonas Mačiulis	33	Lokomotiv Kuban	(Russia)			Free	August 9, 2018	
1	PF	(United States)	Delroy James	31	Gaziantep	(Turkey)			Free	January 2, 2019	
25	PG	(North Macedonia)	Jordan Theodore	29	free agent				Free	January 4, 2019	
0	G	(United States)	Gabe York	25	Lakeland Magic	(United States)			Free	April 12, 2019	
33	C	(United States)	Trevor Mbakwe	30	Osaka Evessa	(Japan)			Free	April 25, 2019	

=== Players Out ===
No.	Pos.	Nat.	Name	Age	Moving to		Type	Transfer fee	Date	Source
11	SG	(Canada)	Xavier Rathan-Mayes	24	Texas Legends	(United States)		Free	December 29, 2018	
30	PF	(United States)	Tyler Roberson	23	Agua Caliente Clippers	(United States)		Free	January 9, 2019	

== Friendlies ==
Win Loss

2 September 2018 1	Zlatibor (Serbia)	77–82	(Greece) AEK	Zlatibor
20:00 (EET)

7 September 2018 2	Mega Basket (Serbia)	97–104	(Greece) AEK	Belgrade
20:00 (EET)
				Arena: Mega Factory

8 September 2018 3	Crvena zvezda mts (Serbia)	94–63	(Greece) AEK	Belgrade
20:00 (EET)	Scoring by quarter: 22–16, 20–15, 30–17, 22–15
	Pts: Perperoglou 13; Rebs: Ristić 9 Asts: Čović 10; PIR: not available	Boxscore	Pts: Mačiulis 15; Rebs: not available Asts: not available PIR: not available	Arena: Železnik Hall; Attendance: 30; Referees: not available

14 September 2018 4	Panathinaikos (Greece)	81–82	(Greece) AEK	Nicosia
16:00 (EET)
				Arena: Eleftheria Indoor Hall

15 September 2018 5	Khimki (Russia)	64–71	(Greece) AEK	Nicosia
20:00 (EET)
				Arena: Eleftheria Indoor Hall

16 September 2018 6	Maccabi Tel Aviv (Israel)	95–99	(Greece) AEK	Nicosia
19:30 (EET)
				Arena: Eleftheria Indoor Hall

23 September 2018 7	Banvit (Turkey)	78–83	(Greece) AEK	Istanbul
18:30 (EET)
				Arena: Sinan Erdem Spor Salonu

25 September 2018 8	Besiktas (Turkey)	82–88	(Greece) AEK	Istanbul
17:00 (EET)
				Arena: BJK Akatlar Arena

29 September 2018 9	AEK (Greece)	91–88	(Greece) Holargos	Athens
18:00 (EET)
				Arena: Nikos Galis Olympic Indoor Hall

4 May 2019 10	AEK (Greece)	85–87	(Greece) Lavrio	Athens
18:00 (EET)
				Arena: Nikos Galis Olympic Indoor Hall

12 May 2019 11	Panathinaikos (Greece)	0–0	(Greece) AEK	Athens
13:00 (EET)
				Arena: Nikos Galis Olympic Indoor Hall

15 May 2019 12	Peristeri (Greece)	71–89	(Greece) AEK	Athens
17:30 (EET)
				Arena: Peristeri Indoor Hall

== Competitions ==
=== Overall ===
Competition	Started round	Current position / round	Final position / round	First match	Last match
Greek League	Matchday 1	—	3rd	6 October 2018	15 June 2019
Greek Cup	Round of 16	—	Quarterfinals	3 October 2018	3 November 2018
Champions League	Group Stage	—	Quarterfinals	10 October 2018	3 April 2019
Intercontinental Cup	Semi-finals	—	Winners	15 February 2019	17 February 2019

Updated to match played June 15, 2019
Source: GBL Games & Results, [https://www.championsleague.basketball/18-19/groups#

=== Overview ===
Competition	Record							
Competition	Pld	W	D	L	PF	PA	PD	Win %
Greek League	38	25	0	13	3,066	2,894	+172	65.79
Greek Cup	2	1	0	1	156	136	+20	50.00
Champions League	18	14	0	4	1,415	1,310	+105	77.78
Intercontinental Cup	2	2	0	0	172	134	+38	100.00
Total	60	42	0	18	4,809	4,474	+335	70.00

Last updated: June 15, 2019
Source: GBL Games & Results, tab=round_100000000000000 BCL Games & Results

=== Greek League ===
==== League table ====
Pos	Team	Pld	W	L	PF	PA	PD	Pts	Qualification or relegation
1	AEK	26	18	8	2129	1995	+134	44	Advance to play-offs
2	Peristeri Vikos Cola	26	17	9	2009	1977	+32	43	Advance to play-offs
3	Panathinaikos OPAP (Note: Panathinaikos OPAP did not receive a point for the forfeit loss to Kymi. Panathinaikos were deducted 6 points.)	26	24	2	2151	1668	+483	43	Advance to play-offs
4	Promitheas Patras	26	16	10	2003	1907	+96	42	Advance to play-offs
5	PAOK	26	15	11	1992	1955	+37	41	Advance to play-offs
6	Olympiacos (Note: Olympiacos didn't show up for regular season and playoff games against Panathinaikos thus have been expelled from 2018 to 2019 Greek Basketball League and relegated to Greek A2 Basket League after zeroing.)	0	0	0	0	0	0	0	Relegation to A2 League
7	Ifaistos Limnou	26	13	13	1914	1995	−81	39	Advance to play-offs
8	Holargos	26	12	14	1850	1899	−49	38	Advance to play-offs
9	Aris	26	8	18	1811	1883	−72	34	
10	Rethymno Cretan Kings	26	8	18	1906	2053	−147	34	
11	Panionios	26	8	18	1950	2210	−260	34	
12	Kymi	26	8	18	1899	2100	−201	34	
13	Lavrio Aegean Cargo	26	7	19	1997	2123	−126	33	
14	Kolossos H Hotels	26	5	21	1958	2204	−246	31	Relegation to A2 League

Updated to match(es) played on 24 May 2019. Source: ESAKE

==== Results summary ====
Overall						Home					Away				
Pld	W	L	PF	PA	PD	W	L	PF	PA	PD	W	L	PF	PA	PD
26	18	8	2129	1995	+134	12	2	1180	1016	+164	6	6	949	979	−30

Last updated: May 8, 2019.
Source: GBL Rankings

==== Results by round ====
Round	1	2	3	4	5	6	7	8	9	10	11	12	13	14	15	16	17	18	19	20	21	22	23	24	25	26
Ground	A	H	A	A	H	A	H	A	H	A	H	A	A	H	A	H	A	A	H	A	H	A	H	A	H	A
Result	L	W	W	L	W	W	W	W	W	L	W	L	W	W	L	W	W	W	W	W	W	W	L	L	L	W
Position	8	4	4	6	4	4	5	4	4	5	4	4	4	3	3	5	3	3	3	3	3	2	2	2	2	1

Updated to match(es) played on May 8, 2019. Source: GBL Fixtures
A = Away; H = Home; W = Win; D = Draw; L = Loss

==== Regular season ====
Win Loss

6 October 2018 1	Peristeri	83–80	AEK	Athens
18:00 (EET)	Scoring by quarter: 21-17, 23-8, 23-22, 16-33
	Pts: Harrow 21; Rebs: Harrow, Širko 6 Asts: Harrow 6 PIR: Harrow 26	Boxscore	Pts: Mayes 22; Rebs: Mačiulis 7 Asts: Mayes 8 PIR: Mayes 27	Arena: Peristeri Arena

13 October 2018 2	AEK	91–71	PAOK	Athens
17:00 (EET)	Scoring by quarter: 24-19, 24-16, 25-17, 18-19
	Pts: Larentzakis, Hunter 18; Rebs: Mačiulis 9 Asts: Xanthopoulos 6 PIR: Hunter 23	Boxscore	Pts: Hatcher 15; Rebs: Hatcher 10; Asts: Koniaris 4 PIR: Hatcher 23	Arena: Nikos Galis Olympic Indoor Hall

20 October 2018 3	Rethymno	57–66	AEK	Rethymno
15:45 (EET)	Scoring by quarter: 17-15, 14-15, 15-19, 11-17
	Pts: Burtt 17; Rebs: Clanton 13; Asts: Clanton 4 PIR: Clanton 21	Boxscore	Pts: Larentzakis 15; Rebs: Roberson 7 Asts: Xanthopoulos 3 PIR: Sant-Roos	Arena: Melina Merkouri

27 October 2018 4	Promitheas Patras	79–69	AEK	Patras
18:00 (EET)
				Arena: Dimitris Tofalos

10 November 2018 5	AEK	73–63	Holargos	Athens
18:00 (EET)
				Arena: Nikos Galis Olympic Indoor Hall

17 November 2018 6	Kymi	67–78	AEK	Kymi
18:00 (EET)
				Arena: Tasos Kampouris Indoor Hall

25 November 2018 7	AEK	83–69	Ifaistos	Athens
15:00 (EET)
				Arena: Nikos Galis Olympic Indoor Hall

8 December 2018 8	Aris	77–81	AEK	Thessaloniki
17:30 (EET)
				Arena: Nick Galis Hall

15 December 2018 9	AEK	83–64	Lavrio	Athens
17:00 (EET)
				Arena: Nikos Galis Olympic Indoor Hall

23 December 2018 10	Panathinaikos	111–79	AEK	Athens
21:00 (EET)
				Arena: Nikos Galis Olympic Indoor Hall

29 December 2018 11	AEK	73–62	Panionios	Athens
19:00 (EET)
				Arena: Nikos Galis Olympic Indoor Hall

6 January 2019 12	Olympiacos	101–75	AEK	Piraeus
19:30 (EET)
				Arena: Peace and Friendship Stadium

12 January 2019 13	AEK	94–79	Kolossos	Athens
16:00 (EET)
				Arena: Nikos Galis Olympic Indoor Hall

20 January 2019 14	AEK	96–70	Peristeri	Athens
17:00 (EET)
				Arena: Nikos Galis Olympic Indoor Hall

26 January 2019 15	PAOK	88–79	AEK	Thessaloniki
17:30 (EET)
				Arena: Sports Arena

2 February 2019 16	AEK	82–62	Rethymno	Athens
17:00 (EET)
				Arena: Nikos Galis Olympic Indoor Hall

2 March 2019 17	AEK	83–62	Promitheas Patras	Athens
16:00 (EET)
				Arena: Nikos Galis Olympic Indoor Hall

9 March 2019 18	Holargos	70–81	AEK	Athens
18:00 (EET)

16 March 2019 19	AEK	96–92	Kymi	Athens
17:00 (EET)
				Arena: Nikos Galis Olympic Indoor Hall

23 March 2019 20	Ifaistos	74–87	AEK	Lemnos
15:45 (EET)
				Arena: Nikos Samaras

30 March 2019 21	AEK	81–73	Aris	Athens
17:00 (EET)
				Arena: Nikos Galis Olympic Indoor Hall

6 April 2019 22	Lavrio	94–100(OT)	AEK	Lavrio
17:00 (EET)	Scoring by quarter: 28-20, 14-29, 27-21, 20-19, Overtime: 5-11
				Arena: Lavrio Indoor Hall

10 April 2019 23	AEK	72–104	Panathinaikos	Athens
19:30 (EET)
				Arena: Nikos Galis Olympic Indoor Hall

13 April 2019 24	Panionios	78–74	AEK	Athens
15:45 (EET)
				Arena: Sofia Befon Indoor Hall

21 April 2019 25	AEK	67–76	Olympiacos	Athens
16:45 (EET)
				Arena: Nikos Galis Olympic Indoor Hall

8 May 2019 26	Kolossos	69–106	AEK	Rhodes
17:30 (EET)
				Arena: Venetokleio Indoor Hall

==== Results overview ====
Win Loss

Opposition	Home score	Away score	Double
Aris	81–73	77–81	162–150
Ifaistos Limnou	83–69	74–87	170–143
Kolossos H Hotels	94–79	69–106	200–148
Peristeri Vikos Cola	96–70	83–80	176–153
Kymis	96–92	67–78	174–159
Lavrio Aegean Cargo	83–64	94–100	183–158
Olympiacos	67–76	101–75	142–177
Panathinaikos	72–104	111–79	151–215
Panionios	73–62	78–74	147–140
PAOK	91–71	88–79	170–159
Promitheas Patras	83–62	79–69	152–141
Rethymno Cretan Kings	82–62	57–66	148–119
Holargos	73–63	70–81	154–133

==== Quarterfinals ====
Win Loss

18 May 2019 1st Round	AEK	84–62	Holargos	Athens
19:30 (EET)
				Arena: Nikos Galis Olympic Indoor Hall

22 May 2019 2nd Round	Holargos	88–72	AEK	Athens
20:00 (EET)

24 May 2019 3rd Round	AEK	88–75	Holargos	Athens
17:15 (EET)
				Arena: Nikos Galis Olympic Indoor Hall

==== Semifinals ====
Win Loss

29 May 2019 1st Round	AEK	83–82	Promitheas	Athens
19:30 (EET)
				Arena: Nikos Galis Olympic Indoor Hall

1 June 2019 2nd Round	Promitheas	74–65	AEK	Patras
19:00 (EET)
				Arena: Dimitris Tofalos Arena

3 June 2019 3rd Round	AEK	88–60	Promitheas	Athens
19:30 (EET)
				Arena: Nikos Galis Olympic Indoor Hall

5 June 2019 4th Round	Promitheas	70–54	AEK	Patras
21:00 (EET)
				Arena: Dimitris Tofalos Arena

7 June 2019 5th Round	AEK	84–85	Promitheas	Athens
19:30 (EET)
				Arena: Nikos Galis Olympic Indoor Hall

==== Third Place ====
Win Loss

9 June 2019 1st Round	AEK	66–67	Peristeri	Athens
19:30 (EET)
				Arena: Nikos Galis Olympic Indoor Hall

11 June 2019 2nd Round	Peristeri	71–79	AEK	Peristeri
19:00 (EET)
				Arena: Peristeri Arena

13 June 2019 3rd Round	AEK	91–83	Peristeri	Athens
19:30 (EET)
				Arena: Nikos Galis Olympic Indoor Hall

15 June 2019 4th Round	Peristeri	82–83	AEK	Peristeri
19:00 (EET)
				Arena: Peristeri Arena

=== Greek Cup ===
Win Loss

Round of 16

3 October 2018 Round of 16	Diagoras Dryopideon	54–76	AEK	Athens
19:00 (EET)

Quarterfinals

3 November 2018 Quarterfinal	PAOK	82–80	AEK	Thessaloniki
(EET)
				Arena: Sports Arena

=== FIBA Champions League ===
==== Regular season - Group C ====
Pos	Team	Pld	W	L	PF	PA	PD	Pts	Qualification	AEK	JER	BRO	ANT	LIE	JDA	NYM	FUE
1	(Greece) AEK	14	12	2	1133	1034	+99	26	Advance to round of 16	—	75–79	93–86	77–76	65–59	80–56	80–76	78–71
2	(Israel) Hapoel Jerusalem	14	12	2	1265	1093	+172	26	Advance to round of 16	70–83	—	103–89	92–72	81–67	86–72	88–64	91–77
3	(Germany) Brose Bamberg	14	9	5	1152	1136	+16	23	Advance to round of 16	77–73	85–88	—	82–78	82–77	73–64	78–71	88–89
4	(Belgium) Telenet Giants Antwerp	14	7	7	1120	1099	+21	21	Advance to round of 16	64–71	101–89	76–85	—	70–64	67–63	85–72	102–78
5	(Lithuania) Lietkabelis	14	5	9	1073	1107	−34	19	Transfer to FIBA Europe Cup	65–84	70–97	84–67	87–91	—	78–62	97–86	78–67
6	(France) JDA Dijon	14	4	10	1058	1118	−60	18	Transfer to FIBA Europe Cup	80–90	83–85	97–101	61–80	99–91	—	74–63	85–87
7	(Czech Republic) ČEZ Nymburk	14	4	10	1097	1183	−86	18		93–94	80–111	78–84	82–74	78–71	78–89	—	104–87
8	(Spain) Montakit Fuenlabrada	14	3	11	1082	1210	−128	17		82–90	75–105	65–75	96–84	78–85	59–73	71–72	—

Source: Basketball Champions League
Legend: Blue = home team win; Red = away team win.

==== Results summary ====
Overall						Home					Away				
Pld	W	L	PF	PA	PD	W	L	PF	PA	PD	W	L	PF	PA	PD
14	12	2	1133	1034	+99	6	1	548	503	+45	6	1	585	531	+54

Last updated: February 6, 2019.
Source: tab=round_100000000000000 BCL Group C Results

==== Results by round ====
Round	1	2	3	4	5	6	7	8	9	10	11	12	13	14
Ground	H	A	H	A	H	H	A	A	H	A	H	A	A	H
Result	L	W	W	W	W	W	W	W	W	L	W	W	W	W
Position	7	5	4	4	2	2	2	1	1	1	1	1	1	1

Updated to match(es) played on February 6, 2019. Source: BCL Group C Fixtures
A = Away; H = Home; W = Win; D = Draw; L = Loss

==== Regular season ====
Win Loss

10 October 2018 1	AEK Athens (Greece)	75–79	(Israel) Hapoel Jerusalem	Athens
19:30 (EET)	Scoring by quarter: 21-16, 21-15, 13-27, 20-21
	Pts: Mayes 17; Rebs: Hunter 11; Asts: Xanthopoulos, Larentzakis 5 PIR: Šakota 19	Boxscore	Pts: Brown 21; Rebs: Owens 10; Asts: Brown 8 PIR: Brown 22	Arena: Nikos Galis Olympic Indoor Hall

16 October 2018 2	Nymburk (Czech Republic)	93–94(OT)	(Greece) AEK Athens	Prague
19:30 (EET)	Scoring by quarter: 17-30, 19-22, 26-14, 20-16, Overtime: 11-12
	Pts: Hruban 25; Rebs: Peterka 11; Asts: Lawrence 13; PIR: Hruban 26	Boxscore	Pts: Larentzakis 23; Rebs: Hunter, Griffin 8 Asts: Mayes 11; PIR: Larentzakis 27	Arena: Královka Arena

24 October 2018 3	AEK Athens (Greece)	93–86	(Germany) Bamberg	Athens
19:30 (EET)	Scoring by quarter: 21-15, 23-19, 23-25, 26-27
	Pts: Mayes 24; Rebs: Hunter 5 Asts: Mayes 6	Boxscore	Pts: Rubit 24; Rebs: Kulboka 7 Asts: Rice 7	Arena: Nikos Galis Olympic Indoor Hall

30 October 2018 4	Dijon (France)	80–90	(Greece) AEK Athens	Dijon
21:30 (EET)
		Boxscore		Arena: Palais des Sports de Dijon

7 November 2018 5	AEK Athens (Greece)	78–71	(Spain) Fuenlabrada	Athens
19:30 (EET)
		Boxscore		Arena: Nikos Galis Olympic Indoor Hall

13 November 2018 6	AEK Athens (Greece)	65–59	(Lithuania) Lietkabelis	Athens
19:30 (EET)
		Boxscore		Arena: Nikos Galis Olympic Indoor Hall

20 November 2018 7	Antwerp Giants (Belgium)	64–71	(Greece) AEK Athens	Antwerp
21:00 (EET)
		Boxscore		Arena: Lotto Arena

11 December 2018 8	Hapoel Jerusalem (Israel)	70–83	(Greece) AEK Athens	Jerusalem
19:45 (EET)
		Boxscore		Arena: Pais Arena Jerusalem

19 December 2018 9	AEK Athens (Greece)	80–76	(Czech Republic) Nymburk	Athens
19:30 (EET)
		Boxscore		Arena: Nikos Galis Olympic Indoor Hall

8 January 2019 10	Bamberg (Germany)	77–73	(Greece) AEK Athens	Bamberg
21:00 (EET)
		Boxscore		Arena: Brose Arena

16 January 2019 11	AEK Athens (Greece)	80–56	(France) Dijon	Athens
19:30 (EET)
		Boxscore		Arena: Nikos Galis Olympic Indoor Hall

23 January 2019 12	Fuenlabrada (Spain)	82–90	(Greece) AEK Athens	Fuenlabrada
21:30 (EET)
		Boxscore		Arena: Polideportivo Fernando Martín

29 January 2019 13	Lietkabelis (Lithuania)	65–84	(Greece) AEK Athens	Panevėžys
19:00 (EET)
		Boxscore		Arena: Cido Arena

6 February 2019 14	AEK Athens (Greece)	77–76	(Belgium) Antwerp Giants	Athens
21:30 (EET)
		Boxscore		Arena: Nikos Galis Olympic Indoor Hall

==== Results overview ====
Win Loss

Opposition	Home score	Away score	Double
(Israel) Hapoel Bank Yahav Jerusalem	75–79	70–83	158–149
(Germany) Brose Bamberg	93–86	77–73	166–163
(Spain) Montakit Fuenlabrada	78–71	82–90	168–153
(Czech Republic) ČEZ Nymburk	80–76	93–94	174–169
(Belgium) Telenet Giants Antwerp	77–76	64–71	148–140
(France) JDA Dijon	80–56	80–90	170–136
(Lithuania) Lietkabelis Panevėžys	65–59	65–84	149–124

==== Round of 16 ====
Win Loss

5 March 2019 1st Round	PAOK (Greece)	75–84	(Greece) AEK	Thessaloniki
19:30 (EET)	Scoring by quarter: 11–30, 25–15, 10–20, 29–19
	Pts: Koniaris 18; Rebs: Garrett 8 Asts: Koniaris 4	Boxscore	Pts: Hunter 20; Rebs: Hunter 12; Asts: Theodore 7	Arena: Sports Arena; Referees: (Serbia) Aleksandar Glišić (Romania) Marius Ciulin (Ukraine) Sergiy Zashchuk

13 March 2019 2nd Round	AEK (Greece)	62–63	(Greece) PAOK	Athens
18:30 (EET)	Scoring by quarter: 18–14, 14–13, 13–20, 17–16
	Pts: Hunter 11; Rebs: Hunter, James 7 Asts: Sant-Roos, Theodore 3	Boxscore	Pts: Jefferson 11; Rebs: Jefferson 9 Asts: Hatcher, Goss 4	Arena: Nikos Galis Olympic Indoor Hall; Referees: (Spain) Antonio Conde (France) Yohan Rosso (Italy) Saverio Lanzarini

Win Loss

Opposition	Home score	Away score	Double
(Greece) PAOK	62–63	75–84	146–138

==== Quarterfinals ====
Win Loss

27 March 2019 1st Round	Bamberg (Germany)	71–67	(Greece) AEK	Bamberg
21:00 (EET)	Scoring by quarter: 11–10, 17–20, 21–20, 22–17
	Pts: Alexander 19; Rebs: Alexander, Heckmann 7 Asts: Hickman, Zisis 5 Eff: Alexander 21	Boxscore	Pts: Šakota 15; Rebs: three players 6 Asts: Sant-Roos 4 Eff: Larentzakis 20	Arena: Brose Arena; Referees: (Italy) Manuel Mazzoni (Latvia) Martins Kozlovskis (Poland) Janusz Calik

3 April 2019 2nd Round	AEK (Greece)	69–67	(Germany) Bamberg	Athens
19:30 (EET)	Scoring by quarter: 20-17, 16-15, 18-17, 15-18
		Boxscore		Arena: Nikos Galis Olympic Indoor Hall

Win Loss

Opposition	Home score	Away score	Double
(Germany) Brose Bamberg	69–67	71–67	136–138

=== FIBA Intercontinental Cup ===
Final Four

Win Loss

15 February 2019 Semi-final	San Lorenzo (Argentina)	64–86	(Greece) AEK	Rio de Janeiro
22:00 (EET)	Scoring by quarter: 13–18, 13–27, 28–23, 10–18
	Pts: Tucker 17; Rebs: Anthony 9 Asts: Calfani 5	Boxscore	Pts: 15 James & Šakota; Rebs: 8 James; Asts: 5 Xanthopoulos	Arena: Carioca Arena 1 Referees: (Puerto Rico) Roberto Vázquez (Slovenia) Boris Krejic (Mexico) Omar Bermúdez Mariscal

17 February 2019 Final	AEK (Greece)	86–70	(Brazil) Flamengo	Rio de Janeiro
23:00 (EET)	Scoring by quarter: 20–19, 22–14, 21–22, 23–15
	Pts: Theodore 22; Rebs: James 7 Asts: Theodore 5	Boxscore	Pts: 21 Varejão; Rebs: 11 Varejão; Asts: 8 Balbi	Arena: Carioca Arena 1 Referees: (Puerto Rico) Roberto Vázquez (Canada) Michael Weiland (France) Yohan Rosso
