= Tyler Roberson =

American basketball player (born 1994)

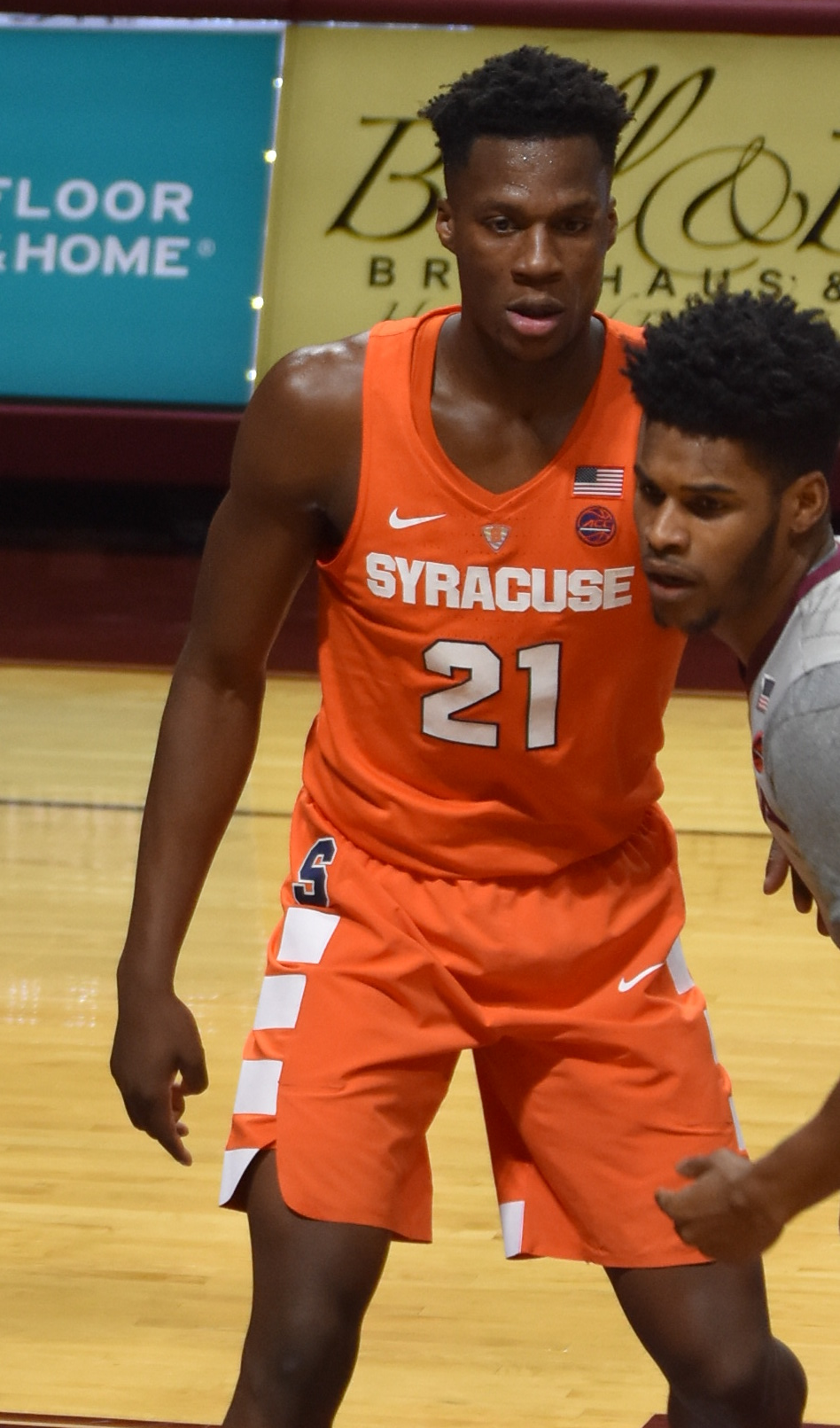
- Roberson in action with Syracuse.

No. 21 – Gaziantep Basketbol
- Position: Power forward / center
- League: TBL

Personal information
- Born: November 27, 1994 (age 31) Union Township, New Jersey
- Listed height: 6 ft 9 in (2.06 m)
- Listed weight: 227 lb (103 kg)

Career information
- High school: Union (Union Township, New Jersey); Roselle Catholic (Roselle, New Jersey)
- College: Syracuse (2013–2017)
- NBA draft: 2017: undrafted
- Playing career: 2017–present

Career history
- 2017–2018: Agua Caliente Clippers
- 2018–2019: AEK Athens
- 2019: Agua Caliente Clippers
- 2019: Fos Provence Basket
- 2019–2020: Agua Caliente Clippers
- 2020: South Bay Lakers
- 2021: Tallinna Kalev/TLÜ
- 2022: Delaware Blue Coats
- 2022: KK Viimsi
- 2022–2023: Szedeák
- 2023–present: Gaziantep Basketbol

Tyler Evan Roberson (born November 27, 1994) is an American professional basketball player for Gaziantep Basketbol of the Turkish Basketball First League (TBL). He played college basketball for the Syracuse Orange.

== Early life ==
Roberson is the son of Carla and Edmon Roberson and has three brothers and one sister. Roberson was taught how to play basketball by his father and first started expressing interest in the game at age four. He played at Union High School for a season and joined the New Jersey RoadRunners of AAU competition. As a sophomore, Roberson transferred to Roselle Catholic. He averaged 17.5 points and 11.7 rebounds for a 25-5 state championship team his senior year. Roberson committed to Syracuse over offers from Villanova and Kansas.

== College career ==
He was suspended at the start of his freshman season due to an eligibility issue and received limited minutes the rest of the year. Roberson averaged 8.3 points and 7.3 rebounds per game as a sophomore. Roberson scored 14 points and gathered 20 rebounds in a win over Duke on January 17, 2016. As a junior, Roberson started all 37 games on Syracuse's Final Four team in 2016. In the NCAA Tournament, he pulled down 18 rebounds in the first-round win over Dayton. Roberson scored nine points and pulled down 10 rebounds in the Orange's Sweet 16 victory against Gonzaga. He contributed 10 points and eight rebounds in the Midwest Region final versus Virginia. Roberson averaged 8.8 points and a team-leading 8.5 rebounds per game as a junior. He averaged 5.3 points and 4.9 rebounds in 20 minutes per game as a senior.

== Professional career ==
Roberson was selected by the Agua Caliente Clippers with the 15th pick in the 2017 NBA G League Draft. He was the second former Syracuse player drafted after John Gillon was taken with the 10th pick by the Texas Legends. On March 15, 2018, Roberson had 10 points, 11 rebounds and four assists in a 108–104 loss at the South Bay Lakers. In his rookie season for the Clippers, he averaged 9.7 points and 6.7 rebounds per game.

On July 26, 2018, the AEK Athens of the Greek Basket League announced that they had signed Roberson. On January 9, 2019, Roberson parted ways with AEK.

On January 24, 2019, Roberson re-signed with the Agua Caliente Clippers. In 20 games (two starts) with the Clippers during the 2019–20 season, Roberson averaged 6.1 points and 4.4 rebounds while shooting 58.2 percent from the field. He was traded to the South Bay Lakers on February 27, 2020, in exchange for a third-round pick in the 2020 NBA G League draft.

In April 2021, Roberson signed with Tallinna Kalev/TLÜ of the Estonian League, making his debut in a game against TalTech Basketball.

On January 3, 2022, Roberson was acquired by the Delaware Blue Coats. He was waived on January 31.

On February 14, 2022, Roberson signed with KK Viimsi, returning to Latvian-Estonian Basketball League.

== Career statistics ==
=== Domestic leagues ===
==== Regular season ====
Note: Only games in the primary domestic competitions are included. Therefore, games in cup or European competitions are left out.

Year	Team	League	GP	MPG	FG%	3P%	FT%	RPG	APG	SPG	BPG	PPG
2018–19	A.E.K.	GBL	11	13.5	.500	-	.556	4.6	.2	.3	.3	6.5

=== FIBA Champions League ===
Year	Team	GP	MPG	FG%	3P%	FT%	RPG	APG	SPG	BPG	PPG
2018–19	A.E.K.	8	11.9	.514	-	.455	2.9	.4	.5	.6	5.1

== Coaching career ==
Roberson signed with Athletes Untapped as a private basketball coach on Jun 24, 2024.
