= Vince Hunter =

American basketball player

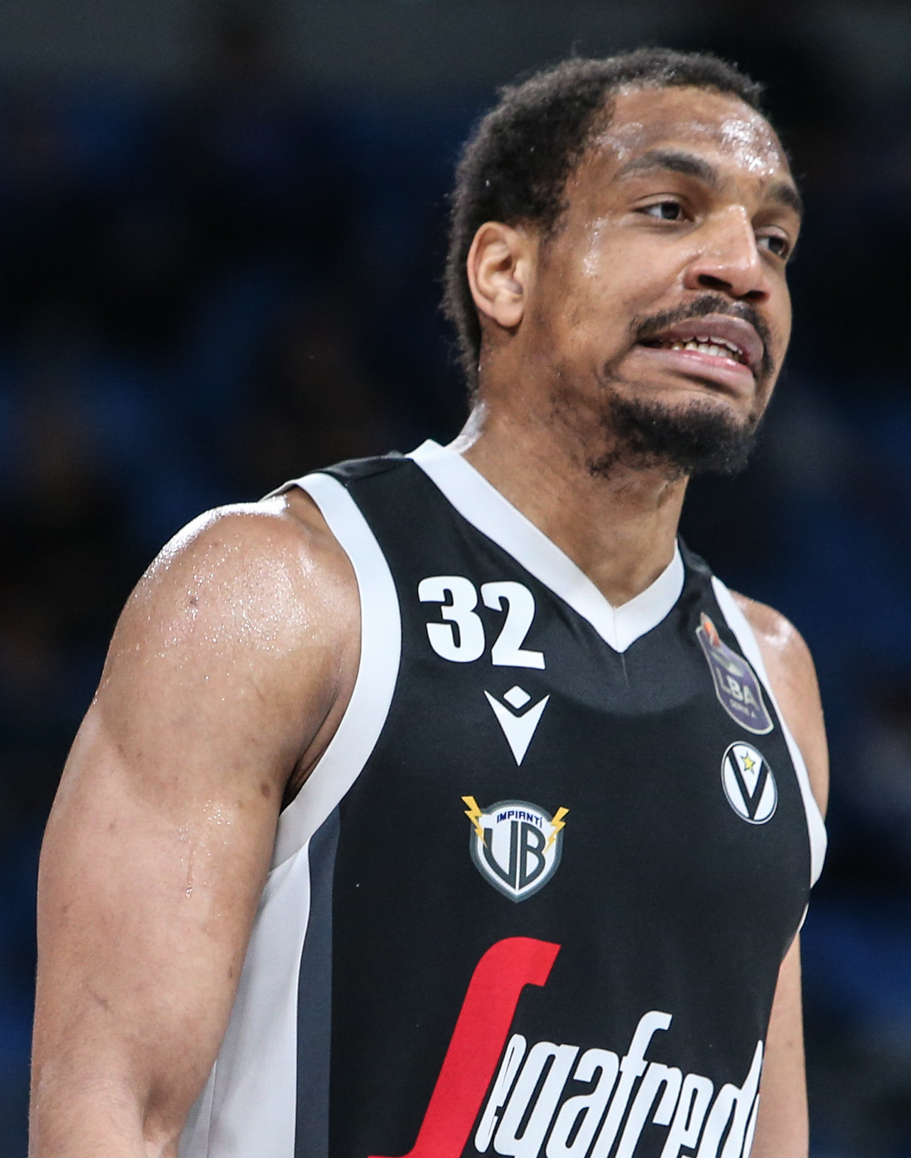
- Hunter in 2020

No. 32 – La Laguna Tenerife
- Position: Center / power forward
- League: Liga ACB; EuroCup

Personal information
- Born: August 5, 1994 (age 32) Detroit, Michigan, U.S.
- Listed height: 2.03 m (6 ft 8 in)
- Listed weight: 101 kg (223 lb)

Career information
- High school: Consortium College Prep (Detroit, Michigan)
- College: UTEP (2013–2015)
- NBA draft: 2015: undrafted
- Playing career: 2015–present

Career history
- 2015–2016: Reno Bighorns
- 2016: Panathinaikos
- 2016–2017: Avtodor Saratov
- 2017–2018: Memphis Grizzlies
- 2017–2018: →Memphis Hustle
- 2018–2019: AEK Athens
- 2019–2021: Virtus Bologna
- 2021–2022: Metropolitans 92
- 2022–2023: UNICS Kazan
- 2023–2025: Zenit Saint Petersburg
- 2025–2026: Lokomotiv Kuban
- 2026–present: La Laguna Tenerife

Career highlights
- All-EuroCup Second Team (2021); FIBA Intercontinental Cup champion (2019); FIBA Champions League champion (2018); All-FIBA Champions League First Team (2019); FIBA Champions League Top Scorer (2019); All-Greek League Second Team (2019); Greek League steals leader (2019); Greek Cup winner (2018); Italian League champion (2021); VTB United League champion (2023); VTB United League Supercup winner (2023); VTB United League Defensive Player of the Year (2024); NBA D-League All-Star (2016); First-team All-Conference USA (2015); Second-team All-Conference USA (2014); Conference USA Freshman of the Year (2014); Conference USA All-Freshman Team (2014)
- Stats at NBA.com
- Stats at Basketball Reference

Vincent Hunter (born August 5, 1994) is an American professional basketball player for La Laguna Tenerife of the Liga ACB and the EuroCup. He played college basketball for the UTEP Miners.

== High school career ==
Hunter attended Consortium College Prep, in Detroit, Michigan, where he was named team MVP as a senior, after averaging 26.5 points, 14 rebounds, four blocks and four steals per game, helping the team compile a 20–4 record.

== College career ==
After graduating high school, Hunter joined UTEP, where he played 67 games, starting 58, and averaged 13.6 points, 7.9 rebounds, 2.4 turnovers, 1.4 assists and 1.0 steals per game, over two seasons. Among several college honors, he was named to the watch list of the Julius Erving Award, in his final season with the Miners, an honor that determines the top small forward at the collegiate level. In April 2015, he declared for the NBA draft, following his sophomore season at UTEP.

== Professional career ==
=== Reno Bighnorns (2015–16) ===
After failing to be drafted in the 2015 NBA draft, Hunter joined the Philadelphia 76ers, for the 2015 Las Vegas Summer League. He later agreed to terms with Sacramento Kings, signing with the team for training camp on September 9, 2015. However, he was later waived by the Kings, on October 15, after appearing in one preseason game.

On November 2, he was acquired by the Reno Bighorns, of the NBA Development League, as an affiliate player of the Kings. On November 13, he made his professional debut, in a 123–121 loss to the Los Angeles D-Fenders, recording 21 points, 17 rebounds and one assist, in 40 minutes. On January 29, 2016, he was named to the West All-Star team, for the 2016 NBA D-League All-Star Game. Hunter played his final game for Reno on February 16. In 32 D-League games, he averaged 21.8 points, 11.3 rebounds, 1.4 assists, 1.0 steals and 1.5 blocks per game.

=== Panathinaikos (2016) ===
Three days later, he signed with Greek club Panathinaikos, for the rest of the season. In 14 Greek national league games with Panathinaikos, he averaged 2.9 points and 3.3 rebounds per game. He also appeared in eight EuroLeague games, averaging 4.0 points and 1.9 rebounds per game.

=== Avtodor Saratov (2016–17) ===
In July 2016, Hunter joined the Los Angeles Clippers, for the Orlando Summer League, and the Memphis Grizzlies for the Las Vegas Summer League. On September 26, 2016, he signed with the Chicago Bulls, but was later waived on October 4.

Five days later, he signed with the Grizzlies, but he was waived again on October 20, after appearing in four preseason games. On November 26, he signed with the Russian club Avtodor Saratov of the VTB United League.

=== Memphis Grizzlies (2017–18) ===
On August 23, 2017, Hunter was selected by the Wisconsin Herd, in the NBA G League expansion draft. However, on September 11 that same year, Hunter signed a two-way contract with the Memphis Grizzlies, meaning that he could split time during the season between the Grizzlies and their own G League affiliate, the Memphis Hustle, instead of the Herd. On January 13, 2018, he was waived by the Grizzlies.

=== AEK Athens (2018–19) ===
On January 22, 2018, he moved to Greek club AEK Athens, for the rest of the season. With AEK, he won both FIBA Champions League, and the Greek Cup's 2018 edition. On July 22, 2018, Hunter signed a contract extension with AEK Athens, that would keep with the Greek club for another season.

=== Virtus Bologna (2019–2021) ===
On July 22, 2019, he signed with Virtus Bologna of the Italian Lega Basket Serie A (LBA). On 7 April 2020, after more than a month of suspension, the Italian Basketball Federation officially ended the 2019–20 season, due to the coronavirus pandemic that severely hit Italy. Virtus ended the season first, with 18 wins and only 2 defeats, but the title was not assigned. On 5 May, the EuroCup season ended.

After having knocked out 3–0 both Basket Treviso in the quarterfinals and New Basket Brindisi in the semifinals, on 11 June 2021 Virtus defeated 4–0 its historic rival Olimpia Milano in the national finals, winning its 16th national title and the first one after 20 years.

Despite having signed a two-year deal with Virtus after the end of the season, on 21 July 2021, the club exited from the contract when Hunter was suspended for three months for having tested positive for the banned drug THC, thereby violating the anti-doping sports code.

=== Metropolitans 92 (2021–2022) ===
On August 14, 2021, Hunter signed with Metropolitans 92 of the French LNB Pro A.

=== La Laguna Tenerife (2026–present) ===
On August 21, 2026, he signed with La Laguna Tenerife of the Liga ACB and the EuroCup.

== Personal life ==
Hunter is the son of Rachel Hunter. He has two brothers and one sister. One of his brothers, Matt, played college basketball for the Central Connecticut Blue Devils.

== Career statistics ==
Legend
GP	Games played	GS	Games started	MPG	Minutes per game
FG%	Field goal percentage	3P%	3-point field goal percentage	FT%	Free throw percentage
RPG	Rebounds per game	APG	Assists per game	SPG	Steals per game
BPG	Blocks per game	PPG	Points per game	**Bold**	Career high

=== NBA ===
==== Regular season ====
Year	Team	GP	GS	MPG	FG%	3P%	FT%	RPG	APG	SPG	BPG	PPG
2017–18	Memphis	4	0	1.9	.600	–	–	.8	–	–	.3	1.5

=== Domestic Leagues ===
==== Regular season ====
Legend
GP	Games played	MPG	Minutes per game	FG%	Field goal percentage
3P%	3-point field goal percentage	FT%	Free throw percentage	RPG	Rebounds per game
APG	Assists per game	SPG	Steals per game	BPG	Blocks per game
PPG	Points per game	**Bold**	Career high		Led the league

Note: Only games in the primary domestic competitions are included. Therefore, games in cup or European competitions are left out.

Year	Team	League	GP	MPG	FG%	3P%	FT%	RPG	APG	SPG	BPG	PPG
2017–18	A.E.K.	GBL	12	15.4	.635	.358	.737	2.8	.3	.5	1.0	9.0
2018–19	A.E.K.	GBL	26	25.0	.561	.125	.634	5.7	1.4	1.5	.7	13.3

=== FIBA Champions League ===
†	Denotes seasons in which Vince Hunter won the FIBA Champions League

Year	Team	GP	MPG	FG%	3P%	FT%	RPG	APG	SPG	BPG	PPG
2017–18†	A.E.K.	8	16.3	.636	–	.577	4.4	.1	.9	1.5	8.9
2018–19	A.E.K.	18	26.3	.663	–	.618	8.1	1.7	1.3	1.1	18.0

== Awards and accomplishments ==
=== Pro career ===
- FIBA Intercontinental Cup champion: 2019
- Basketball Champions League champion: 2018
- Greek Basketball Cup winner: 2018

=== Individual ===
- Basketball Champions League Star Lineup: 2018–19
- Basketball Champions League Top Scorer: 2018–19
- Greek Basket League Top Scorer: 2018–19
- 3 x Basketball Champions League Game Day MVP (2017–18: Gameday 4, Gameday 12, Gameday 13)
- 2018–19 Basketball Champions League Highest Efficiency per game: 22.8
- 2018–19 Basketball Champions League Most points per game: 18.0
- 2018–19 Greek Basket League Most points (full season): 508
- 2018–19 Greek Basket League Most points (playoffs): 162
- 2018–19 Greek Basket League PIR leader (full season): 571
- 2018–19 Greek Basket League Steals leader (full season): 52
- 2018–19 Greek Basket League Steals leader (regular season): 40
- 2018–19 Greek Basket League Two-point scoring leader (full season): 203
- 2018–19 Greek Basket League Two-point scoring leader (regular season): 142
- 2018–19 Greek Basket League Two-point scoring leader (playoffs): 61
- NBA G League All-Star: 2016
- First-team All-Conference USA (2015)
- Second-team All-Conference USA (2014)
- Conference USA Freshman of the Year (2014)
- Conference USA All-Freshman Team (2014)
