= Vassilis Xanthopoulos =

Greek basketball player (born 1984)

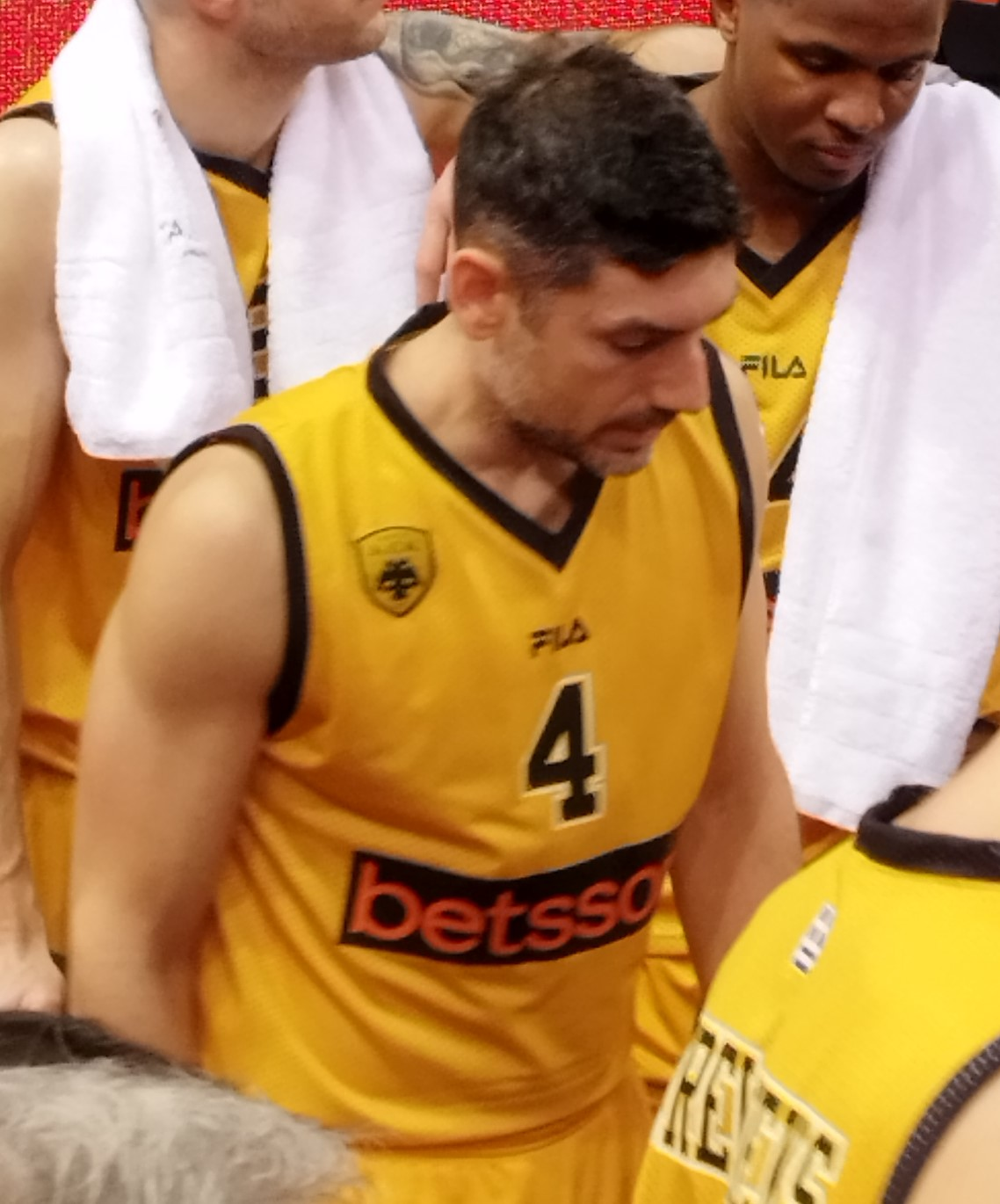
- Xanthopoulos in action with AEK Athens

Peristeri
- Position: Head coach
- League: Greek Basketball League

Personal information
- Born: 29 April 1984 (age 42) Marousi, Athens, Greece
- Listed height: 6 ft 2 in (1.88 m)
- Listed weight: 205 lb (93 kg)

Career information
- NBA draft: 2006: undrafted
- Playing career: 2002–2025
- Number: 4

Career history

Playing
- 2002–2004: Near East
- 2004–2005: Panathinaikos
- 2005–2006: PAOK Thessaloniki
- 2006–2007: Panathinaikos
- 2007–2009: Panionios
- 2009–2011: Panellinios
- 2011–2012: Panionios
- 2012–2013: Panathinaikos
- 2013–2014: Obradoiro
- 2014–2015: Panionios
- 2015–2017: Aris Thessaloniki
- 2017–2019: AEK Athens
- 2019–2020: Peristeri
- 2020–2022: Kolossos Rodou
- 2022–2023: AEK Athens
- 2023–2025: Peristeri

Coaching
- 2025–present: Peristeri

Career highlights
- FIBA Intercontinental Cup champion (2019); European Triple Crown winner (2007); EuroLeague champion (2007); FIBA Champions League champion (2018); 3× Greek League champion (2005, 2007, 2013); 4× Greek Cup winner (2005, 2007, 2013, 2018); Greek League assists leader (2021)
Medals
Men's basketball
Representing Greece
FIBA World Cup
Silver medal – second place	2006 Japan
FIBA Stanković World Cup
Gold medal – first place	2006 China
FIBA EuroBasket
Bronze medal – third place	2009 Poland
Mediterranean Games
Silver medal – second place	2001 Tunisia	Under-26
FIBA Under-21 World Cup
Silver medal – second place	2005 Argentina	U-21 Team
FIBA Under-19 World Cup
Bronze medal – third place	2003 Greece	U-19 Team
FIBA U-20 EuroBasket
Gold medal – first place	2002 Lithuania	Under-20
Albert Schweitzer U-18 World Tournament
Gold medal – first place	2002 Mannheim	Under-18
FIBA U-18 EuroBasket
Bronze medal – third place	2000 Croatia	Under-18
FIBA Under-16 European Championschip
Silver medal – second place	1999 Slovenia	Under-16

Vassilis Xanthopoulos (alternate spellings: Vasilis, Vasileios, Vasilios; Greek: Βασίλης Ξανθόπουλος; born 29 April 1984) is a Greek former professional basketball player and coach, who is currently the head coach for Peristeri of the Greek Basketball League. He is 6 ft 2 in (1.88 m) tall and he played at the point guard position.

During his pro club career, Xanthopoulos won the World Club Championship FIBA Intercontinental Cup title in 2019, a European Triple Crown winner in 2007, the European-wide top-tier level EuroLeague championship in 2007, and the European-wide secondary level FIBA Champions League championship in 2018.

== Early life and youth career ==
Xanthopoulos grew up playing for the youth teams of the Greek club Olympiacos Piraeus. Xanthopoulos began playing with Olympiacos' junior teams in 1997. He began his senior men's club playing career with the Greek club Peiraikos Syndesmos, of the Greek 3rd Division, in the 2001–02 season.

== Professional career ==
=== Near East (2002–2004) ===
Xanthopoulos started his professional career with the Greek Basket League club Near East in 2002.

=== Panathinaikos (2004–2005) ===
Xanthopoulos transferred from Near East to the Greek powerhouse Panathinaikos in 2004.

=== PAOK (2005–2006) ===
In 2005, Xanthopoulos was loaned by Panathinaikos to PAOK.

=== Panathinaikos (2006–2007) ===
In 2006, Xanthopoulos returned to Panathinaikos Athens, and with them he won the European Triple Crown in 2007. His team accomplished this by winning the Greek League championship, the Greek Cup, and the EuroLeague all in the same season.

=== Panionios (2007–2009) ===
In 2007, Xanthopoulos transferred to the Greek club Panionios.

=== Panellinios (2009–2011) ===
In 2009, Xanthopoulos moved to the Greek club Panellinios.

=== Panionios (2011–2012) ===
In 2011, Xanthopoulos rejoined Panionios.

=== Panathinaikos (2012–2013) ===
In 2012, Xanthopoulos returned to Panathinaikos as an auxiliary player.

=== Obradoiro (2013–2014) ===
Xanthopoulos moved to the Spanish League club Obradoiro in 2013.

=== Panionios (2014–2015) ===
Xanthopoulos returned for a second stint with Panionios in 2014.

=== Aris (2015–2017) ===
In 2015, Xanthopoulos moved to Aris, where he spent two seasons.

=== AEK (2017–2019) ===
On July 5, 2017, Xanthopoulos moved to AEK Athens of the Greek Basket League, where he signed a one-year contract, with the option of renewal for another season. With AEK, he won the Greek Cup title, in 2018, as well as the FIBA Champions League title during the same season.

=== Peristeri (2019–2020) ===
On July 1, 2019, Xanthopoulos and AEK officially parted ways. Three days later, Xanthopoulos joined the Greek club Peristeri. He averaged 2.6 points, 1.6 rebounds and 3.5 assists per game with Peristeri. On August 13, 2020, Xanthopoulos left the team.

=== Kolossos Rodou (2020–2022) ===
On August 21, 2020, Xanthopoulos moved to the Greek club Kolossos Rodou. On June 30, 2021, he renewed his contract with the Greek island team, and was named team captain. In 17 games, he averaged 4.2 points (shooting with 36% from the 3-point line), 2.4 rebounds, 4.9 assists and 1 steal in 20 minutes per contest. He was ruled out just before the end of the season, due to an unspecified injury.

=== Return to AEK (2022–2023) ===
On August 29, 2022, Xanthopoulos returned to AEK for a second stint, following his Kolossos head coach Ilias Kantzouris to the team. In 22 league games, he averaged 2.4 points, 1 rebound and 3.8 assists in 14 minutes per contest.

=== Peristeri (2023–2025) ===
On July 29, 2023, Xanthopoulos returned to Peristeri, under head coach Vassilis Spanoulis.

On May 3, 2025, Xanthopoulos announced his retirement from professional basketball after the last game of the season against Panionios.

== National team career ==
=== Greek junior national team ===
Xanthopoulos was a member of the Greek junior national teams. He won the bronze medal at the 2002 FIBA Europe Under-18 Championship, the bronze medal at the 2003 FIBA Under-19 World Cup, and the silver medal at the 2005 FIBA Under-21 World Cup. He also played at the 2004 FIBA Europe Under-20 Championship.

=== Greek senior national team ===
Xanthopoulos was also a member of the senior men's Greek national team. With Greece's senior national team, he played at the 2011 FIBA EuroBasket.

== Career statistics ==
=== Domestic Leagues ===
==== Regular season ====
Legend
GP	Games played	MPG	Minutes per game	FG%	Field goal percentage
3P%	3-point field goal percentage	FT%	Free throw percentage	RPG	Rebounds per game
APG	Assists per game	SPG	Steals per game	BPG	Blocks per game
PPG	Points per game	**Bold**	Career high		Led the league

Note: Only games in the primary domestic competitions are included. Therefore, games in cup or European competitions are left out.

Year	Team	League	GP	MPG	FG%	3P%	FT%	RPG	APG	SPG	BPG	PPG
2011–12	Panionios	GBL	24	25.5	.413	.370	.412	1.7	4.0	1.4	0	6.6
2012–13	Panathinaikos	GBL	24	14.1	.457	.483	.692	1.7	3.0	1.0	0	3.6
2013–14	Obradoiro	ACB	34	17.3	.296	.278	.618	1.8	3.1	1.0	0	2.8
2014–15	Panionios	GBL	24	27.0	.398	.339	.813	2.5	5.4	1.6	.1	6.8
2015–16	Aris	GBL	25	16.4	.361	.265	.500	1.6	3.2	1.6	.1	2.7
2016–17	Aris	GBL	26	21.2	.347	.328	.710	2.6	2.7	1.7	0	4.2
2017–18	A.E.K.	GBL	26	17.4	.300	.229	.750	1.5	2.8	1.1	0	2.5
2018–19	A.E.K.	GBL	13	16.2	.361	.350	.500	1.9	2.6	.5	.1	2.6

=== FIBA Champions League ===
†	Denotes seasons in which Vasilis Xanthopoulos won the FIBA Champions League

Year	Team	GP	MPG	FG%	3P%	FT%	RPG	APG	SPG	BPG	PPG
2016–17	Aris	18	19.6	.571	.429	.714	2.2	3.5	1.4	.0	3.3
2017–18†	A.E.K.	20	17.3	.529	.400	.917	1.4	2.8	1.2	.0	2.7
2018–19	A.E.K.	8	16.3	.375	.200	-	1.0	3.0	1.1	0	.9
