= Mike Green (basketball, born 1985) =

American basketball player (born 1985)

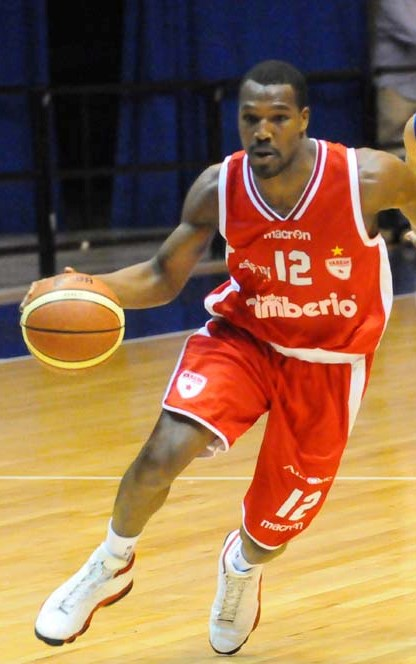
- Green in action with Varese in 2012

Personal information
- Born: June 23, 1985 (age 41) Philadelphia, Pennsylvania, US
- Listed height: 6 ft 1 in (1.85 m)
- Listed weight: 175 lb (79 kg)

Career information
- High school: Franklin Learning Center (Philadelphia, Pennsylvania)
- College: Towson (2003–2005); Butler (2006–2008)
- NBA draft: 2008: undrafted
- Playing career: 2008–2020
- Position: Point guard / shooting guard

Career history
- 2008–2009: Antalya
- 2009–2010: Liège
- 2010–2011: Cantù
- 2011–2012: Barcellona
- 2012–2013: Varese
- 2013–2014: Khimki
- 2014–2015: Paris-Levallois
- 2015–2016: Reyer Venezia
- 2016: Best Balıkesir
- 2016–2017: Karşıyaka
- 2017–2018: AEK Athens
- 2018–2019: SIG Strasbourg
- 2019–2020: Igokea

Career highlights
- FIBA Champions League champion (2018); FIBA Champions League Final Four MVP (2018); Greek Cup winner (2018); Leaders Cup winner (2019); Belgian Supercup winner (2009); French Pro A assists leader (2015); Horizon League Player of the Year (2008); Chip Hilton Player of the Year (2008); Frances Pomeroy Naismith Award (2008)

Michael Edward Green (born June 23, 1985) is an American former professional basketball player. He played college basketball for Towson and Butler.

== High school career ==
Green played high school basketball at Franklin Learning Center, in Philadelphia, Pennsylvania.

== College career ==
Green played college basketball for Butler University from 2006 to 2008. He was the Horizon League men's basketball player of the year in 2007–2008 after leading Butler in points, rebounds and assists as a senior.

== Professional career ==
He went undrafted in the 2008 NBA draft. He played for the Philadelphia 76ers in the Orlando Pro Summer League in 2010, and later with the Portland Trail Blazers in the NBA Summer League.

He played with Antalya Büyükşehir Belediyesi of the Turkish Basketball League, Liege in Belgium and Cantù in Italy.

On July 31, 2011, he signed with Sigma Barcellona of the Italian Second Division for the 2011–12 season. In July 2012, he signed with Cimberio Varese.

In July 2013, Green signed a two-year deal with the Russian team BC Khimki. In June 2014, he parted ways with Khimki.

In July 2014, he signed with Paris-Levallois.

On June 29, 2015, he signed with Reyer Venezia Mestre of the Italian Lega Basket Serie A for the 2015–16 season.

On July 28, 2016, Green signed with Turkish club Best Balıkesir. On December 14, 2016, he left Balıkesir and signed with Pınar Karşıyaka. Green played in the Basketball Champions League with Karşıyaka, and was named the Round of 16 MVP.

On August 2, 2017, he signed with AEK Athens of the Greek League for the 2017–18 season. With AEK, he won the Greek Cup title, in 2018. On May 6, 2018, Green won the FIBA Champions League title with AEK. He was named the Final Four MVP after the final, after scoring 19 points in the final game.

== Career statistics ==
=== Domestic Leagues ===
==== Regular season ====
Legend
| GP | Games played | MPG | Minutes per game | FG% | Field goal percentage |
| 3P% | 3-point field goal percentage | FT% | Free throw percentage | RPG | Rebounds per game |
| APG | Assists per game | SPG | Steals per game | BPG | Blocks per game |
| PPG | Points per game | **Bold** | Career high | | Led the league |

Note: Only games in the primary domestic competitions are included. Therefore, games in cup or European competitions are left out.

| Year | Team | League | GP | MPG | FG% | 3P% | FT% | RPG | APG | SPG | BPG | PPG |
|---|---|---|---|---|---|---|---|---|---|---|---|---|
| 2017–18 | A.E.K. | GBL | 26 | 26.6 | .391 | .358 | .856 | 2.9 | 4.5 | 0.9 | 0.1 | 10.4 |

=== FIBA Champions League ===
| † | Denotes seasons in which Mike Green won the FIBA Champions League |

| Year | Team | GP | MPG | FG% | 3P% | FT% | RPG | APG | SPG | BPG | PPG |
|---|---|---|---|---|---|---|---|---|---|---|---|
| 2017–18† | A.E.K. | 20 | 27.3 | .404 | .364 | .778 | 2.8 | 5.0 | .8 | .1 | 11.5 |
