= Nikos Kamarianos =

Greek basketball player

Nikos Kamarianos Νίκος Καμαριανός
Panionios
- Position: Power forward
- League: Greek A2 Elite League

Personal information
- Born: March 21, 1997 (age 29) Athens, Greece
- Listed height: 6 ft 8.5 in (2.04 m)
- Listed weight: 205 lb (93 kg)

Career information
- Playing career: 2015–present

Career history
- 2015–2017: AEK Athens
- 2016–2017: →Nea Kifissia
- 2017–2018: Nea Kifissia
- 2018–2020: Panionios
- 2020–2021: Kolossos Rodou
- 2021–2022: PAOK
- 2022–2023: Maroussi
- 2023–2026: Kolossos Rodou
- 2026: Karditsa
- 2026–present: Panionios

Career highlights
- Greek A2 Elite League champion (2023); Greek A2 Elite League Final Four MVP (2023)

Nikolaos Kamarianos (Greek: Νικόλαος "Νίκος" Καμαριανός; born March 21, 1997) is a Greek professional basketball player for Panionios of the Greek A2 Elite League. He is a 2.04 m (6 ft 8 1/2 in) tall power forward.

== Youth career ==
Kamarianos played from a young age with the youth teams of Palaio Faliro, Panellinios and Panathinaikos, before he started his pro career.

== Professional career ==
Kamarianos signed his first professional contract with the Greek Basket League club AEK Athens, on 21 July 2015.

On August 17, 2020, Kamarianos moved to Kolossos Rodou on a two-year contract. On July 3, 2021, he parted ways with the island team.

On August 2, 2021, Kamarianos signed with PAOK. In 18 games, he averaged 3 points and 2.6 rebounds in 10 minutes per contest.

Kamarianos spent the 2022-2023 campaign with second division club Maroussi, eventually achieving promotion to the first division. He averaged an impressive 12.7 points, 6.9 rebounds and 2.3 assists in 28 minutes per game.

On August 17, 2023, Kamarianos agreed to return to Kolossos Rodou. On June 24, 2024, he renewed his contract through 2026. The option for 2026 was exercised officially on June 13, 2025. On January 9, 2026, Kamarianos parted ways with the island club.
