= Kelsey Barlow =

American basketball player (born 1991)

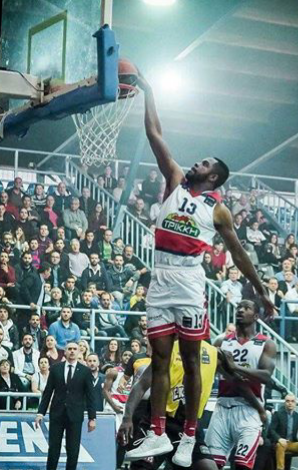
- Barlow in action with Aries Trikala

Personal information
- Born: February 14, 1991 (age 35) Thessaloniki, Greece
- Listed height: 6 ft 5 in (1.96 m)
- Listed weight: 215 lb (98 kg)

Career information
- High school: Cathedral (Indianapolis, Indiana)
- College: Purdue (2009–2012); UIC (2013–2014)
- NBA draft: 2014: undrafted
- Playing career: 2014–2024
- Position: Small forward / shooting guard / point guard

Career history
- 2014–2016: Grand Rapids Drive
- 2016: Lille Métropole
- 2016–2017: Aries Trikala
- 2017–2018: AEK Athens
- 2018: Hoops Club
- 2018–2019: Sakarya BB
- 2019–2021: Hispano Americano
- 2021: Panteras de Aguascalientes
- 2021–2022: Defensor Sporting
- 2022: Hispano Americano
- 2022–2024: Beroe
- 2024: Peñarol Mar del Plata

Career highlights
- Big Ten All-Freshman team (2010)

Kelsey Barlow (born February 14, 1991) is an American former professional basketball player. He played college basketball for Purdue and UIC. His website is www.stambi.com .

== High school career ==
Barlow played high school basketball at Cathedral High School in Indianapolis, Indiana, being coached by Scott Hicks. He was tabbed the No. 41 small forward in the country by ESPN and was a three-star ranking by Scout.com. He garnered a spot on the Indianapolis Star All-City second team in 2009 and was named to the IBCA All-State Underclassmen Team in 2008. Barlow named the MVP of the City-County All-Star Game after pouring in 18 points. As a senior, he averaged 11 points, six rebounds and five assists per game .

== College career ==
Barlow played college basketball at Purdue, with the Purdue Boilermakers, from 2009 to 2012. As a freshman, Barlow was a role player averaging 3.4 points, 2.3 rebounds and 1.6 assists per game in 16.0 minutes per game. As a sophomore, he played in 32 games averaging 5.1 points, 2.9 rebounds and 1.6 assists in 19.5 minutes per game. From 2013 to 2014 he played at UIC, with the UIC Flames. During his senior year, Barlow averaged 14.8 points, 4.9 rebounds and 3.9 assists, leading his team in points and assists.

== Professional career ==
=== Grand Rapids Drive and Lille Métropole (2014–2016) ===
Barlow started his pro career in 2014, with the Grand Rapids Drive of the NBA Development League where he was selected in Round 5 with Pick 5 in the 2014 NBA Development League Draft, During his first season, Barlow averaged 7.2 points and 2.7 rebounds with the Drive.

In July 2015, Barlow joined the Detroit Pistons for the 2015 NBA Summer League, where he averaged 7 points, 2 rebounds and 2.5 assists in two games. Then he re-signed with the Grand Rapids Drive for the season. On April 7, 2016, Barlow signed with Lille Métropole of the LNB Pro B for the rest of the 2015–16 season. At the end of the full season, Barlow went on to average 11.7 points, 4.7 rebounds and 2.2 assists in 11 games for Lille.

=== Aries Trikala (2016–2017) ===
On August 26, 2016, Barlow signed with the Greek League club Aries Trikala. On February 7, 2017, he was voted as the Stoiximan.gr MVP of the week along with Vlado Janković after having 21 points, 5 rebounds, 5 assists and 1 steal against Rethymno Cretan Kings. At the end of the full season, Barlow went on to average 14 points, 4.3 rebounds, 3.2 assists, and 1.3 steals in 26 games for Trikala. During the season, Barlow scored in double figures 20 times, having also 1 double-double in points and rebounds. He also was the second best scorer of the regular season of the league with 363 points behind Will Cummings, who had 367.

=== AEK Athens (2017–2018) ===
After the end of the season, it was rumored that Barlow was close to join with AEK Athens. On April 8, 2017, he confirmed his move to AEK Athens. On July 5, 2017, AEK announced that Barlow signed a two-year contract. He was officially released from the club on March 6, 2018.

=== Kymis (2018) ===
On August 24, 2018, it was announced that Barlow had signed with Kymis. On September 23, however, he left from the Greek club before the start of the season.

=== Hispano Americano (2019–2021) ===
Barlow joined Hispano Americano of the Argentine Liga Nacional de Básquet in 2019. In 27 games he averaged 18.8 points, 4.5 rebounds, 3.3 assists and 1.7 steals per game. During the 2020–21 season, Barlow averaged 17.6 points, 5.8 rebounds, 3.7 assists and 1.7 steals per game.

=== Panteras de Aguascalientes (2021) ===
On October 1, 2021, Barlow signed with Panteras de Aguascalientes of the Liga Nacional de Baloncesto Profesional

== Career statistics ==
=== Domestic Leagues ===
==== Regular season ====
Legend
GP	Games played	MPG	Minutes per game	FG%	Field goal percentage
3P%	3-point field goal percentage	FT%	Free throw percentage	RPG	Rebounds per game
APG	Assists per game	SPG	Steals per game	BPG	Blocks per game
PPG	Points per game	**Bold**	Career high		Led the league

Note: Only games in the primary domestic competitions are included. Therefore, games in cup or European competitions are left out.

Year	Team	League	GP	MPG	FG%	3P%	FT%	RPG	APG	SPG	BPG	PPG
2016–17	Trikala	GBL	26	32.5	.433	.281	.635	4.3	3.2	1.4	0.3	14.0
2017–18	A.E.K.	GBL	15	19.4	.409	.320	.895	2.4	1.1	0.8	0.1	7.1

=== FIBA Champions League ===
Year	Team	GP	MPG	FG%	3P%	FT%	RPG	APG	SPG	BPG	PPG
2017–18	A.E.K.	14	17.5	.204	.208	.833	2.1	.8	.4	.1	2.7

== Personal life ==
Barlow's father, Ken Barlow, was also a professional basketball player who also played at the Greek Basket League for PAOK from 1990 until 1993. His brother Keenan, played also for the Indiana State Sycamores before finishing his collegiate career at Tiffin. (OH). Kelsey was born in Thessaloniki few weeks before PAOK won FIBA European Cup Winner's Cup in Geneva.
