= 2017–18 Greek Basketball Cup =

2017–18 Greek Cup
- Season: 2017–18
- Duration: 13 September 2017 – 17 February 2018
- Teams: 62

Finals
- Champions: AEK (4th title)
- Runners-up: Olympiacos
- Finals MVP: (United States) Manny Harris

The 2017–18 Greek Basketball Cup was the 43rd edition of Greece's top-tier level professional national domestic basketball cup competition. The previous winners of the cup were Panathinaikos Superfoods. The cup competition started on 13 September 2017, and ended 17 February 2018. AEK won the competition.

== Format ==
The top six placed teams from the top-tier level Greek Basket League 2016–17 season, gained an automatic bye to the 2017–18 Greek Cup quarterfinals. While the eight lower placed teams from the 2016–17 Greek Basket League season; along with all of the teams from the 2nd-tier level Greek A2 Basket League 2017–18 season, and the 3rd-tier level Greek B Basket League 2017–18 season, play in preliminary rounds, competing for the other two quarterfinals places. The quarterfinals and onward rounds are played under a single elimination format.

== Preliminary rounds ==
=== Phase 1 ===
==== Round 1 ====
Wednesday 2017-09-13

Home team		Away team	Score
Ionikos Nikaias	–	Diagoras Dryopideon	91 – 80
K.A.O. Corinth	–	Iraklio	73 – 65
Filathlitikos	–	Pagrati	66 – 68
Mandraikos	–	Ippokratis	85 – 71
Tritonas	–	Dafni Dafniou	79 – 74
Panerithraikos	–	Panelefsiniakos	72 – 77
Kifissia	–	Proteas Voulas	54 – 48
Koropi	–	Ikaros Neas Smyrnis	61 – 64
G.S. Elimeias Kozani	–	Pharsala	82 – 58
S.F.K. Pierikos Archelaos	–	Charilaos Trikoupis	0 – 20
Machites Doxas Pefkon	–	Kavala	55 – 63
G.A.S. Chalkidonas	–	Evropi Pefkochoriou	44 – 58
Agrinio	–	Ermis Lagkada	81 – 60
Gefyra	–	S.A. Stratoniou	70 – 66
Anatolia	–	Aspis Xanthi	70 – 56
Titanes Palama	–	Ikaroi Serron	81 – 90

Note: Pierikos Archelaos decided to forfeit their game against Charilaos Trikoupis.

==== Round 2 ====
Saturday 2017-09-16

Home team		Away team	Score
Kavala	–	Arkadikos	109 – 56
Mandraikos	–	Kastoria	71 – 94
G.S. Elimeias Kozani	–	Amyntas	59 – 75
Pagrati	–	Apollon Patras	64 – 62
Ikaros Neas Smyrnis	–	Holargos	65 – 84
Panelefsiniakos	–	Maroussi	68 – 73
Anatolia	–	AEL	84 - 69
Agrinio	–	Ethnikos Pireaus	55 – 70
Nea Kifissia	–	Ermis Agias	83 – 81
Ikaroi Serron	–	Doukas	89 – 63
K.A.O. Corinth	–	Karditsa	64 – 75
Ionikos Nikaias	–	Peristeri	71 – 64
Tritonas	–	Iraklis Thessaloniki	57 – 81
Evropi Pefkochoriou	–	Doxa Lefkadas	72 – 88
Gefyra	–	Psychiko	55 – 62
Charilaos Trikoupis	–	Papagou	69 – 71

==== Round 3 ====
Wednesday 2017-09-20

Home team		Away team	Score
Ionikos Nikaia	–	Doxa Lefkadas	95 – 62
Nea Kifissia	–	Psychiko	67 – 64
Pagrati	–	Amyntas	59 – 76
Maroussi	–	Ethnikos Pireaus	62 – 74
Kavala	–	Papagou	75 – 60
Karditsa	–	Iraklis Thessaloniki	78 – 82
Anatolia	–	Kastoria	69 – 83
Ikaroi Serron	–	Holargos	50 – 79

=== Phase 2 ===
==== Round 1 ====
Saturday 2017-09-23

Home team		Away team	Score
Ionikos Nikaia	–	Trikala Aries	79 – 66
Koroivos	–	Promitheas Patras	79 – 86
Amyntas	–	Kolossos H Hotels	55 – 83
Nea Kifissia	–	Holargos	73 – 86
Faros Larissas	–	Kymis	70 – 66
Kavala	–	Kastoria	81 – 76
Panionios	–	Lavrio	61 – 99
Ethnikos Piraeus	–	Iraklis Thessaloniki	65 – 72

==== Round 2 ====
Wednesday 2017-09-27

Home team		Away team	Σκορ
Promitheas Patras	–	Lavrio	83 – 79
Holargos	–	Faros Larissas	53 – 66
Ionikos Nikaia	–	Iraklis Thessaloniki	92 – 80
Kavala	–	Kolossos H Hotels	43 – 81

==== Round 3 ====
Date	Home team		Away team	Score
Saturday 2017-09-30	Ionikos Nikaias	–	Faros Larissas	70 – 82
Sunday 2017-10-01	Kolossos H Hotels	–	Promitheas Patras	78 – 58

== Final rounds ==
Faros Larissas and Kolossos Rodou reached the quarterfinals, after winning the preliminary rounds. The other six sides were qualified based on their Greek Basket League 2016–17 season position.

Quarterfinals; 4 October 2017
Aris	70
PAOK	63
Faros Larissas	67
Olympiacos	97
AEK	97
Rethymno Cretan Kings	62
Kolossos H Hotels	54
Panathinaikos Superfoods	84

Semifinals; 5 November 2017
Aris	49
Olympiacos	56
AEK	73
Panathinaikos Superfoods	69

Final; 17 February 2018
Olympiacos	83
AEK	88

== Quarterfinals ==
4 October 2017

Aris	70–63	PAOK

Alexandreio Melathron Nick Galis Hall, Thessaloniki

4 October 2017

Faros Larissas	67–97	Olympiacos

Larissa Neapolis Indoor Arena, Larissa

4 October 2017

AEK	97–62	Rethymno Cretan Kings

Nikos Galis Olympic Indoor Hall, Athens

4 October 2017

Kolossos H Hotels	54–84	Panathinaikos Superfoods

Venetokleio Indoor Hall, Rhodes

== Semifinals ==
5 November 2017 Semifinal	Aris	49–56	Olympiacos	Thessaloniki
				Arena: Alexandreio Melathron Nick Galis Hall

5 November 2017 Semifinal	AEK Athens	73–69	Panathinaikos Superfoods	Marousi, Athens
	Scoring by quarter: 17–18, 15–10, 10–16, 31–25
	Pts: Harris 20; Rebs: Elonu 14; Asts: Green 5 Steals: Green & Larentzakis 2 Blocks: Elonu 3 PIR: Elonu 22		Pts: Pappas 14; Rebs: Vougioukas 12; Asts: Calathes 9 Steals: Pappas 3 Blocks: Singleton & Denmon 2 PIR: Vougioukas 17	Arena: Nikos Galis Olympic Indoor Hall; Referees: Charalampos Karakatsounis, Anastasios Manos, Georgios Poursanidis

== Final ==
17 February 2018 Final	Olympiacos	83–88	AEK Athens	Heraklion, Crete
17:15 EET (UTC+2)	Scoring by quarter: 23–26, 19–19, 21–20, 20–23
ERT1	Pts: Spanoulis 20; Rebs: Papanikolaou 12; Asts: Spanoulis 9 Steals: Milutinov 2 Blocks: Papapetrou 2 PIR: Milutinov 25		Pts: Harris 17; Rebs: Green 5 Asts: Green 7 Steals: Hunter & Larentzakis 2 Blocks: James, Green & Šakota 1 PIR: Punter 16	Arena: Heraklion Indoor Sports Arena; Referees: Chrisostomos Schinas, Anastasios Manos, Georgios Poursanidis

Starters:			Pts	Reb	Ast
PG	17	(Greece) Vangelis Mantzaris	3	3	0
SG	7	(Greece) Vassilis Spanoulis	20	1	9
SF	16	(Greece) Kostas Papanikolaou	4	12	2
PF	15	(Greece) Georgios Printezis	10	4	1
C	11	(Serbia) Nikola Milutinov	17	8	0
Reserves:					
C	1	(United States) Jamel McLean	10	2	0
PF	6	(Greece) Ioannis Papapetrou	5	2	1
SG	13	(Latvia) Jānis Strēlnieks	14	1	3
PG	22	(United States) Brian Roberts	0	0	0
C	31	(Greece) Georgios Bogris	DNP		
PF	33	(Canada) Kyle Wiltjer	0	0	0
SF	34	(United States) Hollis Thompson	0	0	0
Head coach:
(Greece) Ioannis Sfairopoulos

Olympiacos	AEK

2018 Greek Cup champions
AEK
4th title

Starters:			Pts	Reb	Ast
PG	2	(United States) Mike Green	6	5	7
SG	12	(Greece) Giannoulis Larentzakis	6	0	3
SF	3	(United States) Manny Harris	17	4	1
PF	1	(United States) Delroy James	11	3	2
C	32	(United States) Vince Hunter	15	3	0
Reserves:					
PG	0	(United States) Kevin Punter	14	3	2
PG	4	(Greece) Vassilis Xanthopoulos	3	1	1
PF	5	(Greece) Dušan Šakota	8	4	1
SF	8	(Greece) Panagiotis Vasilopoulos	0	2	1
SF	9	(Bosnia and Herzegovina) Edin Atić	DNP		
C	22	(Greece) Dimitrios Mavroeidis	4	2	0
C	24	(Greece) Vassilis Kavvadas	4	4	0
Head coach:
(Serbia) Dragan Šakota

== Awards ==
=== Most Valuable Player ===
Player	Team
(United States) Manny Harris	AEK

=== Finals Top Scorer ===
Player	Team
(Greece) Vassilis Spanoulis	Olympiacos
