= Delroy James =

American basketball player

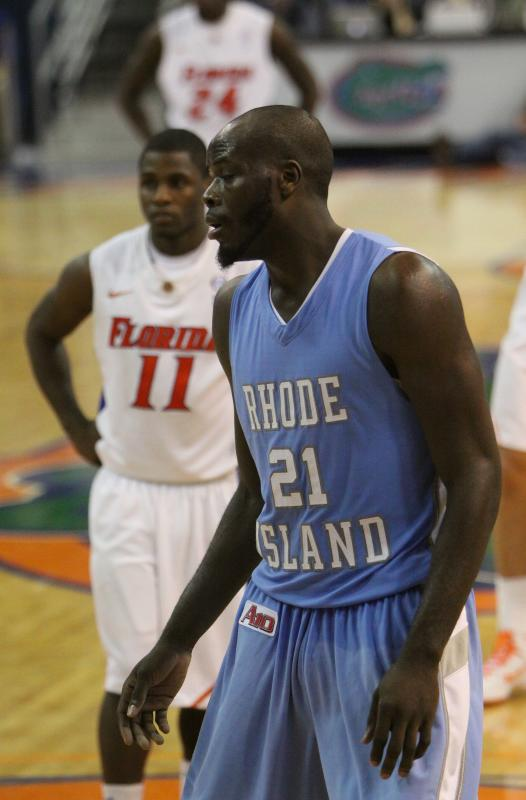
- James with Rhode Island in 2011

Personal information
- Born: May 4, 1987 (age 39) Berbice, Guyana
- Listed height: 6 ft 8 in (2.03 m)
- Listed weight: 220 lb (100 kg)

Career information
- High school: Laurinburg Institute (Laurinburg, North Carolina)
- College: Rhode Island (2007–2011)
- NBA draft: 2011: undrafted
- Playing career: 2011–2022
- Position: Power forward

Career history
- 2011–2012: Bnei Hasharon
- 2012: Tulsa 66ers
- 2012–2013: Basket Ferentino
- 2013–2015: New Basket Brindisi
- 2015–2016: Yenisey Krasnoyarsk
- 2016–2017: Pallacanestro Reggiana
- 2017: Best Balıkesir
- 2017–2018: AEK Athens
- 2018–2019: Gaziantep
- 2019: AEK Athens
- 2019: Meralco Bolts
- 2019–2020: Seoul Samsung Thunders
- 2020: Murcia
- 2020: Promitheas Patras
- 2021: Real Estelí
- 2022: Team Cali

Career highlights
- FIBA Intercontinental Cup champion (2019); FIBA Champions League champion (2018); Greek Super Cup winner (2020); Greek Cup winner (2018); Italian All-Star (2014); Italian 2nd Division All-Star Game MVP (2013); Second-team All-Atlantic 10 (2011); Third-team All-Atlantic 10 (2010); Atlantic 10 Sixth Man of the Year (2009)

Delroy James (born June 4, 1987) is a Guyanese-born, naturalized American former professional basketball player. At a height of 2.03 m (6 ft 8 in) tall, and a weight of 105 kg (231 lb), he can play at the power forward and small forward positions, with power forward being his main position.

== High school career ==
James only started playing basketball whilst in his sophomore high school year, he left Brooklyn that same year, moving to National Christian Academy (Fort Washington, Maryland). For his junior year he moved to Florida Prep (Lake Suzy, Florida) before again transferring the same year, to Laurinburg Institute. He stayed at Laurinburg for his senior season as they accrued a 24–1 record in 2004–05.

During high school he also played in the AAU for New York City sides Aneesa Sports, and the Student-Athlete Broncos,

== College career ==
James was ranked a three star player by both Rivals.com and Scout.com, respectively seen as the 30th and 35th best in his position nationally for 2005. He committed to Rhode Island, playing in the Atlantic 10 Conference of the NCAA Division I, in August 2005, signing a letter of intent in November, over other scholarship offers.

However, after NCAA Initial-Eligibility issues, he had to sit out the entire 2006–07 season. Later he "violated a team academic rule" according to coach Jim Baron, leading to him also missing the first semester of the 2007–08 season. Making his belated debut in the first game of the second semester in December 2007, he had little impact in his freshman season, playing less than 10 minutes on average (3.3 points, 2.4 rebounds) though he had some more notable games.

He came to the fore during his first full season the next year as a sophomore. Playing nearly 25 minutes per game, he averaged 9.9 points and 6.1 rebounds (12th in the Atlantic 10), being awarded as A-10 Sixth Man of the Year.

During his junior season, he started all games, was second best for Rhode Island in scoring (13.2 ppg), rebounding (5.3 rpg) and steals (1.4 spg) and best in blocks (1.2 bpg), on his way to a selection in the All-Atlantic 10 Third Team and NABC All-District 4 Second Team. His performances in the 2010 National Invitation Tournament led to a selection to the All-Tournament Team as the Rams made the semi-finals. These included a career high 34 points against Nevada, a game in which he was credited for restricting Luke Babbitt, the eighth-leading scorer in the nation at the time with 22.1 points per game, to two field goals made (out of fourteen attempted) for 14 points.

In 2010–11, the senior led the Rams in scoring (17.6, 5th in A-10), rebounding (7.8, 6th), steals (1.6, 6th) and blocks, he was only player in the country averaging at least 17.5 points, 7.5 rebounds, 2.5 assists, 1.5 steals and 1.0 blocks per game, leading to a selection to the All-Atlantic 10 Second Team, also making the 2011 NABC All-District 4 Second Team and USBWA All-District 1 Team. He scored the first triple-double in Rhode Island history against Miami (Ohio) in the 2011 College Basketball Invitational during his penultimate college game, finishing his Rams career after a loss in the quarterfinals.

As of 2014, he was 16th on the URI career scoring list (1,460 points), 8th in career blocks (104), steals (146) and games played (123) and 6th in minutes (1,160).

== Professional career ==
=== 2011–12 season ===
James attended the Portsmouth Invitational Tournament, organised in April 2011 by the NBA prior to the draft. He also enthusiastically attended workouts with different NBA teams to overcome the predictions that saw him undrafted in the 2011 NBA draft. He would go undrafted in the end. Furthermore, the 2011 NBA lockout canceled summer leagues and free agent camps, meaning he would have to move abroad to start his professional career.

He joined Israeli team Bnei Hasharon – a team his elder brother Shawn had just left after 3 successful years – signing his first professional contract, a reported six figure deal. He adapted quickly, starting all but one game including three from start to finish, to finish with 16.1 points and 7.7 rebounds on average in 10 games, including a double-double against Shawn's new team, league leaders Maccabi Tel Aviv. He also earned an Israeli League player of the week award during his time in the league.

However, he was released in January 2012, returning to the U.S. to finish the season with NBA D-League team Tulsa 66ers, posting 8.8 points and 4.8 rebounds per game.

=== 2012–13 season ===
After one game in May 2012 for IBA side Jersey G-Force, he attended NBA free agent camps, before playing in the Las Vegas Summer League for the Atlanta Hawks. There he played totals of 21 minutes in 4 games, for 9 points with 2 rebounds.

With the Summer League over, James returned to Europe, this time to Italy with second tier LegaDue side Basket Ferentino (in Italian). He signed a one-year deal in August 2012 after General Manager Pierfrancesco Betti – who had seen him play in Portsmouth the year before – persuaded him through an exposé of the club's achievements in propelling foreign players, such as Manu Ginóbili, to stronger sides. He impressed at Ferentino and dominated in the league, leading to a call up to the Legadue All-Star Game, on which occasion he was nominated game MVP.

=== 2013–14 season ===
After an unfruitful 2013 NBA Summer League with the Utah Jazz, with James not playing a single minute, he joined Enel Brindisi in August 2013, signing a one-year deal with the first division Serie A side. James had no problem adapting to the higher level of competition and when he was called up to the Serie All-Star Game he was described as "one of the keys to Brindisi's success". In nearly 30 minutes per game, he contributed 12.2 points, 7.8 rebounds and 1.3 blocks per game, (the last two respectively 5th and 4th best in the league) as Brindisi finished in fifth place at the end of the regular season. However they were swept in the playoffs, with James missing three free-throws in the dying seconds of the first game 73–75 defeat to Banco di Sardegna Sassari. His stats dipped in the playoffs, with 8 points, 7.3 rebounds and 0.3 blocks in more than 31 minutes, with his free throw shooting a measly 55.6%.

=== 2014–15 season ===
Despite offers from around Europe, James stayed in Apulia for 2014–15, the only foreigner to do so, in order to "finish his work" after the previous season's playoff defeat. He would make his European debut, along with the club, in the Europe-wide third tier EuroChallenge, ending with 10.7 points, 6 rebounds, 0.5 blocks against 3.2 fouls (the latter 3 in the tournament top 20) as Brindisi reached the quarterfinals. In Serie A, Brindisi would finish 6th of the regular season, with James again the 4th best shot blocker after contributing 1.1 blocks per game in around 29 minutes, adding 10.2 points, 7.5 rebounds and 2.1 assists against 3.1 fouls and 2.7 turnovers. Brindisi obtained a historic first playoff win during the series against Grissin Bon Reggio Emilia, James' duel with Achille Polonara was cited as a determinant factor in the following game 3 win, however they would go on to lose the series 3–2.

=== 2015–16 season ===
During the 2015 offseason, James participated in the Ball Up Million Dollar Summer Challenge streetball tournament, winning the tournament with New York-based Sean Bell All-Stars and also collecting the MVP prize (along with the prize money). In August 2015, he signed with Russian side Yenisey Krasnoyarsk of the VTB United League.

=== 2016–17 season ===
On August 10, 2016, James signed with Italian club Pallacanestro Reggiana. On January 11, 2017, he left Reggiana and signed with Turkish club Best Balıkesir.

=== 2017–18 season ===
On August 9, 2017, James signed a one-year contract with Greek club AEK Athens. With AEK, he won the Greek Cup title, in 2018.

=== 2018–19 season ===
On August 10, 2018, James signed with Gaziantep of the Turkish Basketball Super League.

On January 2, 2019, James returned to AEK Athens signed contract until the summer of 2020.

=== 2019–20 season ===
On August 3, 2019, he has signed with Seoul Samsung Thunders of the Korean Basketball League.

On February 9, 2020, he has signed with UCAM Murcia of the Liga ACB.

=== 2020–21 season ===
On September 9, 2020, James signed with Promitheas Patras of the Greek Basket League.

In January 2021, he signed with Real Estelí Baloncesto in Nicaragua.

=== 2022–2023 season ===
In 2022, James signed with Team Cali of the Baloncesto Profesional Colombiano.

== The Basketball Tournament (TBT) ==
In the summer of 2017, James, for the second year, competed in The Basketball Tournament on ESPN for Team Fancy. In three games, he averaged 14.0 points, 4.7 rebounds and 1.7 assists to help lead his team to the Super 16 Round where they lost 65–61 to Boeheim's Army; a team composed of Syracuse University basketball alum. James also competed in TBT in 2015 for the Sean Bell All-Star's. In four games that summer, he averaged 9.3 points, 5.3 rebounds and 3.0 assists per game. In TBT 2018, James averaged 10.5 points, 6.5 rebounds, and 1.5 steals per game for Team Fancy. They reached the second round before falling to Boeheim's Army. name

== Player profile ==
James is a left-handed combo forward with a physical and high-energy style.

In attack, he starts from the perimeter, working off the dribble or moving without the ball to set up a scoring opportunity. He is deceptively fast and can burst past defenders, using shot fakes and step throughs on the way, though he can lose control of his run and the ball or try low percentage shots. His size and strength allow him to muscle his way to the hoop, shielding the ball with ease, he can finish even through contact. With a good mid-range jump shot, he's hard to guard due to his size, adding his play in the paint it makes him an all-around scoring threat when in form.

He shines more in defense, where his hustle play and non-stop effort allow him to make an impact, most notably in rebounding on a statistical front. His physical attributes allow him to guard anyone, from point guard to power forward, though he has been noted to struggle against perimeter players. Never afraid to mix it up he uses his athleticism to keep his man off-balance.

Observers feel that for him to play in the NBA, as a 3, he needs to consistently and confidently make shots from the three point line, getting his shot off quicker and smoother. Finishing college at 24, he was not foreseen at the time to change his playing style radically or develop exponentially, though his work ethic was expected to ensure a long, sustained career.

== Personal life ==
The son of Gordon and Marva James, Delroy has seven siblings, including three sisters and four brothers. Three of his older brothers played basketball at a professional or collegiate level:

-Shawn James played with Serie A club EA7 Emporio Armani Milano.
-Gordon has played professionally in Japan and Latin America.
-Lex played for St. Francis without going professional.

His parents moved to the United States from Guyana in 1990 along with four children. They left Delroy with two siblings whilst they made arrangements for them to join them, something that proved possible about 3 years later. Arriving in Brooklyn, New York aged 7, he struggled to adapt to a completely different environment. Though he skipped classes, he also avoided getting involved in the gangs that were rife in his neighbourghood. He has a son, Jaylen, he cites fatherhood as one of his greatest accomplishments, another is graduating and a declared future goal of his would be to use his sociology degree to become a guidance counselor or mentor to children.

== Career statistics ==
Legend
GP	Games played	MPG	Minutes per game	FG%	Field goal percentage
3P%	3-point field goal percentage	FT%	Free throw percentage	RPG	Rebounds per game
APG	Assists per game	SPG	Steals per game	BPG	Blocks per game
PPG	Points per game	**Bold**	Career high		Led the league

Year	Team	League	GP	MPG	FG%	3P%	FT%	RPG	APG	SPG	BPG	PPG
2015–16	Enisey Krasnoyarsk	VTB United	30	27.6	.436	.341	.791	6.5	2.8	1.1	.9	12.5
2016–17	Best Balikesir	TBL	16	32.1	.497	.426	.776	5.7	2.4	1.3	.9	15.8
2016–17	Grissin Bon Reggio Emilia	LBA	15	18.1	.337	.188	.571	3.5	1.5	.9	.9	5.1
2017–18	A.E.K.	GBL	25	20.5	.404	.227	.691	3.5	1.7	1.0	.4	7.1
2017–18	A.E.K.	BCL	20	22.0	.453	.312	.700	4.4	1.6	1.1	.8	8.7
2018–19	A.E.K.	GBL	27	20.0	.456	.184	.853	3.3	1.5	.6	.6	7.0
2018–19	A.E.K.	BCL	9	17.3	.455	.300	.800	3.6	1.8	1.0	1.1	5.7
2018–19	Royal Hali Gaziantep	T-BSL	11	24.8	.364	.333	.708	4.4	1.1	.6	.5	9.1
2018–19	Meralco Bolts	PBA	3	41.2	.485	.409	.650	8.7	6.7	1.7	2.0	28.7
Career		All Leagues	169	22.0	.437	.310	.736	4.3	1.8	.9	.7	8.9

== Honours ==
- Greek Basketball Super Cup: (2020)
