= 2019 FIBA Intercontinental Cup =

- Season: 2019
- Dates: 15–17 February 2019
- Teams: 4

Regular season
- Season MVP: (North Macedonia) Jordan Theodore (AEK)

Finals
- Champions: (Greece) AEK (1st title)
- Runners-up: (Brazil) Flamengo

Records
- Highest scoring: Dar Tucker (San Lorenzo) 37 (final four) (North Macedonia) Jordan Theodore (ΑΕΚ) 22 (in the final)

The 2019 FIBA Intercontinental Cup was the 28th edition of the FIBA Intercontinental Cup. The tournament took place from 15 to 17 February 2019. The tournament was held in Rio de Janeiro, Brazil, at the Carioca Arena 1.

== Format ==
The tournament was held under a Final Four format, played by four teams, and included a third-place game.

== Teams ==
The tournament was contested by four teams. The NBA opted to send the G League champions, rather than send the NBA champions.

Team	Qualification	Qualified date	Participation (bold indicates winners)
(Argentina) San Lorenzo	Winners of the 2018 FIBA Americas League	25 March 2018	Debut
(Greece) AEK	Winners of the 2017–18 Basketball Champions League	6 May 2018	Debut
(United States) Austin Spurs	Winners of the 2017–18 NBA G League	10 April 2018	Debut
(Brazil) Flamengo	Host team		1 (**2014**)

== Venue ==
When the event was announced, it was also announced that the game would be played at the Carioca Arena 1, the home arena of the tournament's host club, Flamengo. Carioca Arena 1 is located in Rio de Janeiro, Brazil. The arena was opened in 2016, and it has a seating capacity of 6,000 people for basketball games.

Rio de Janeiro	2019 FIBA Intercontinental Cup (Brazil)
Carioca Arena 1	2019 FIBA Intercontinental Cup (Brazil)
Capacity: 6,000	2019 FIBA Intercontinental Cup (Brazil)

== Bracket ==
Semifinals
15 February
(Argentina) San Lorenzo	64
**(Greece) AEK**	**86**
15 February
**(Brazil) Flamengo**	**90**
(United States) Austin Spurs	58

Final
17 February
**(Greece) AEK**	**86**
(Brazil) Flamengo	70
Third place game
17 February
**(Argentina) San Lorenzo**	**77**
(United States) Austin Spurs	59

=== Semifinals ===
15 February 2019 Semifinal	San Lorenzo (Argentina)	64–**86**	**(Greece) AEK Athens**	Rio de Janeiro
18:00 (UTC-3)	Scoring by quarter: 13–**18**, 13–**27**, **28**–23, 10–**18**
	Pts: Tucker **17**; Rebs: Anthony **9** Asts: Calfani **5** Steals: Aguirre & Calfani 2 Blocks: Anthony **6** PIR: Anthony **25**	Box Score	Pts: James & Šakota 15; Rebs: James 8 Asts: Xanthopoulos **5** Steals: Griffin **3** Blocks: James 1 PIR: James 22	Arena: Carioca Arena 1 Referees: Roberto Vázquez (Puerto Rico), Boris Krejič (Slovenia), Omar Bermúdez Mariscal (Mexico)

15 February 2019	**Flamengo (Brazil)**	**90**–58	(United States) Austin Spurs	Carioca Arena 1
21:00 (UTC-3)	Scoring by quarter: **20**–15, **24**–14, **23**–11, **23**–18
	Pts: Balbi **19**; Rebs: Nesbitt **10**; Asts: Balbi **6**	Box Score	Pts: **10** Huestis; Rebs: **7** Bader & Brimah; Asts: **3** McCamey, Rundles, & Green	Referees: Michael Weiland (Canada), Yohan Rosso (France), Carsten Straube (Germany)

=== Third place game ===
17 February 2019	**San Lorenzo (Argentina)**	**77**–59	(United States) Austin Spurs	Carioca Arena 1
15:00 (UTC-3)	Scoring by quarter: **16**–12, 14–**15**, **31**–18, **16**–14
	Pts: Tucker **20**; Rebs: Calfani **10**; Asts: Aguirre **7**	Box Score	Pts: **18** Green; Rebs: **10** Brimah; Asts: **4** Green	Referees: Omar Bermúdez Mariscal (Mexico), Boris Krejic (Slovenia), Carsten Straube (Germany)

=== Final ===
17 February 2019 Final	**AEK Athens (Greece)**	**86**–70	(Brazil) Flamengo	Rio de Janeiro
18:00 (UTC-3)	Scoring by quarter: **20**–19, **22**–14, 21–**22**, **23**–15
	Pts: Theodore **22**; Rebs: James 7 Asts: Theodore 5 Steals: Theodore & Sant-Roos **3** Blocks: Hunter, James & Mačiulis 1 PIR: Theodore 25	Box Score	Pts: Varejão 21; Rebs: Varejão**11**; Asts: Balbi **8** Steals: Mineiro 2 Blocks: Varejão **2** PIR: Varejão**28**	Arena: Carioca Arena 1 Attendance: 6,000; Referees: Roberto Vázquez (Puerto Rico), Michael Weiland (Canada), Yohan Rosso (France)

2019 FIBA Intercontinental Cup champions

**AEK Athens**

**(1st title)**

== Final standings ==
	Team
Gold medal	(Greece) AEK
Silver medal	(Brazil) Flamengo
Bronze medal	(Argentina) San Lorenzo
4	(United States) Austin Spurs

== Final Four MVP ==
- (North Macedonia) Jordan Theodore ( (Greece) AEK)
