= 2019–20 Greek A2 Basket League =

Greek A2 Basket League
- Season: 2019–20
- Dates: 6 October 2019 – 7 March 2020
- Teams: 16

Finals
- Champions: Charilaos Trikoupis
- Runners-up: Diagoras Dryopideon

Statistical leaders
Points	(Greece) Nikos Liakopoulos	19.7
Rebounds	(Montenegro) Milovan Drašković	12.4
Assists	(Greece) Fotis Vasilopoulos	9.7

The 2019–20 Greek A2 Basket League was the 34th season of the Greek A2 Basket League, the second-tier level professional club basketball league in Greece. The league was organized by the Hellenic Basketball Federation. It was the fifth season with the participation of 16 teams. The season was prematurely cancelled, due to the COVID-19 pandemic. Due to that, none of the league's teams were relegated.

== Teams ==
2019–20 Greek A2 Basket League season club locations.

Club	City	Arena	Capacity
Agrinio	Agrinio	Michalis Kousis Indoor Hall	1,500
Amyntas	Athens (Dafni-Ymittos, Dafni)	Pyrkal Ymittos Indoor Hall	600
Anatolia Thessaloniki	Thessaloniki	Anatolia Indoor Hall	
Apollon Patras	Patras	Apollon Patras Indoor Hall	3,500
Charilaos Trikoupis	Missolonghi	Missolonghi Indoor Hall	800
Dafni Dafniou	Attica (Chaidari)	Christos Angourakis Indoor Hall	500
Diagoras Dryopideon	Attica (Aigaleo)	Stavros Venetis Indoor Hall	2,000
Eleftheroupoli Kavalas	Kavala (Eleftheroupoli)	Eleftheroupoli Indoor Sports Center	300
Filippos Verias	Veria	Dimitrios Vikelas Municipal Sports Center	700
ASK Karditsas	Karditsa	Karditsa New Indoor Hall	3,007
Koroivos	Amaliada	Amaliada Ilida Indoor Hall	2,000
Oiakas Nafpliou	Nafplio	Nafplio Municipal Indoor Sports Center	500
Olympiacos B	Piraeus	Peace and Friendship Training Facility	250
Pagrati	Athens (Pangrati)	METS Indoor Hall	1,500
Psychiko	Athens (Psychiko)	Psychiko Indoor Hall	300
Tritonas Sepolion	Athens (Sepolia)	Strefi Indoor Hall	

== Regular season (final league standings) ==
Pos	Club	Pts	Pld	W	L	PF	PA	Diff	Qualification or Relegation
1.	Charilaos Trikoupis	40	21	19	2	1,758	1,577	+181	League champions and promoted to the Greek Basket League
2.	Diagoras Dryopideon*	37	21	16	5	1,818	1,671	+147	Declined to be promoted to the Greek Basket League*
3.	Psychiko	34	21	13	8	1,545	1,524	+21	
4.	Apollon Patras	33	21	12	9	1,614	1,556	+58	
5.	ASK Karditsas	32	21	11	10	1,577	1,571	+6	
6.	Olympiacos B**	32	21	17	4	1,628	1,473	+155	Started the season with minus 6 points.
7.	Eleftheroupoli Kavalas	31	20	11	9	1,573	1,474	+99	
8.	Agrinio	30	21	9	12	1,543	1,562	-19	
9.	Anatolia Thessaloniki	30	21	9	12	1,536	1,554	-18	
10.	Dafni Dafniou	30	21	9	12	1,643	1,662	-19	
11.	Oiakas Nafpliou	29	21	8	13	1,622	1,580	+42	
12.	Tritonas Sepolion	28	21	7	14	1,503	1,628	-125	
13.	Pagrati	28	21	7	14	1,643	1,718	-75	
14.	Filippos Verias	28	21	7	14	1,466	1,643	-177	
15.	Koroivos	27	20	7	13	1,515	1,612	-97	
16.	Amyntas	26	21	5	16	1,409	1,588	-179	

Source: Basket.gr

* Diagoras Dryopideon declined to be promoted to the Greek Basket League.

** Olympiacos B started the season with a 6-point deduction, a rebuke imposed by the Hellenic Basketball Federation as a result of senior club Olympiacos's forfeiting of several Greek Basket League and Greek Cup games, during the 2018–19 season.

== Promotion playoffs ==
- Cancelled due to COVID-19 pandemic

== Relegation playoffs ==
- Cancelled due to COVID-19 pandemic

== See also ==
- 2019–20 Greek Basketball Cup
- 2019–20 Greek Basket League (1st tier)
