= 2018–19 Greek Basketball Cup =

2018–19 Greek Cup
- Season: 2018–19
- Duration: 15 September 2018 – 17 February 2019
- Teams: 62

Finals
- Champions: Panathinaikos OPAP (19th title)
- Runners-up: PAOK
- Finals MVP: (Greece) Nick Calathes

The 2018–19 Greek Basketball Cup was the 44th edition of Greece's top-tier level professional national domestic basketball cup competition. The previous winners of the cup were AEK. The cup competition started on 15 September 2018 and ended on 17 February 2019. Panathinaikos won the competition.

== Format ==
The top six placed teams from the top-tier level Greek Basket League's 2016–17 season, gained an automatic bye to the 2017–18 Greek Cup quarterfinals. While the eight lower placed teams from the 2016–17 Greek Basket League season; along with all of the teams from the 2nd-tier level Greek A2 Basket League's 2017–18 season, and the 3rd-tier level Greek B Basket League's 2017–18 season, played in preliminary rounds, competing for the other two quarterfinals places. The quarterfinals and onward rounds were played under a single elimination format.

== Preliminary rounds ==
=== Phase 1 ===
==== Round 1 ====
Saturday 2018–09–15

Home team		Away team	Score
K.A.O. Corinth	–	A.S.E. Douka	52 – 76
Pagrati	–	G.S. Kronos Agioy Dimitriou	89 – 78
G.S. Mandras "O Nikiforos"	–	A.S. Papagou	81 – 68
Dafni Dafniou	–	Proteas Voulas	71 – 53
A.E. Pentelis	–	Panerithraikos A.S.	79 – 74
A.O. Enosi Iliou	–	A.O. Glafkos	72 – 64
A.O. Triton	–	Panelefsiniakos	76 – 71
Oiakas Nafpliou	–	POK Esperos	64 – 60
MAS Ermis Lagkada	–	SA Stratoniou	63 – 71
G.S. Farsalon	–	K.S. Gefyras	71 – 64
Anatolia	–	Esperos Lamias	76 – 60
G.S. Eleftheroupolis	–	Machites Doxas Pefkon	68 – 45
Makedonikos	–	Philippos Verias	60 – 72
A.M.S Propontis Chal.	–	S.A. Europi 87	52 – 59
Niki Volos	–	A.O. Agriniou	70 – 74
Faiakas Kerkyras	–	Ikaroi Serron	64 – 61

=== Round 2 ===
Wednesday 2018–09–19

Home team		Away team	Score
A.O. Agriniou	–	Diagoras Dryopideon	69 – 72
A.O. Triton	–	Charilaos Trikoupis	76 – 73
Faiakas Kerkyras	–	Aiolos Trikalon	20 – 0
Enosi Iliou	–	A.S.K. Ippokratis	62 – 72
S.A. Europi 87	–	A.S.A. Koroivos	55 – 63
G.S. Farsalon	–	Ermis Agias Larissa	74 – 83
G.S. Eleftheroupolis	–	E.K. Kavalas	67 - 74
Dafni Dafniou	–	Ionikos Nikaias	74 – 104
Oiakas Nafpliou	–	A.E. Psychiko	60 – 71
A.P.S. Philippos Verias	–	Ethnikos OPFP	70 – 58
A.E. Pentelis	–	A.S. Apollon Patras	48 – 74
S.A. Stratoniou	–	Iraklis 2017	66 – 98
A.S.E. Douka	–	A.S. Karditsas	63 – 75
A.O. Pagrati	–	A.O. Amyntas	82 – 74
G.S. Mandraikos	–	A.S. Kastorias	71 – 74
Anatolia	–	G.S. Amarousiou	83 – 72

Note: Aiolos Trikalon decided to forfeit their game against Faiakas Kerkyras.

=== Round 3 ===
Saturday 22 or Sunday 2018–09–23

Home team		Away team	Score
A.S.P. Philippos Verias	–	E.K. Kavalas	68 – 75
Anatolia	–	A.S. Kastoria	71 – 61
Ionikos Nikaias	–	A.S.K. Ippokratis	81 – 82
Faiakas Kerkyras	–	Ermis Agias Larissa	70 – 69
A.O. Triton	–	A.S. Apollon Patron	74 – 63
A.O. Pagrati	–	A.E. Psychiko	78 – 74
Diagoras Dryopideon	–	Iraklis 2017	96 – 86
A.S.A. Koroivos	–	A.S. Karditsa	67 – 65

=== Phase 2 ===
==== Round 1 ====
Wednesday 2018–09–26

Home team		Away team	Σκορ
A.O. Triton	–	Diagoras Dryopideon	80 – 84
A.O. Pagrati	–	Faiakas Kerkyras	88 – 75
Anatolia	–	A.S.A. Koroivos	106 – 104
E.K. Kavalas	–	A.S.K. Ippokratis	90 – 72

==== Round 2 ====
Date	Home team		Away team	Score
Saturday 2018–09–29	Diagoras Dryopideon	–	E.K. Kavalas	90 – 69
Saturday 2018–09–29	A.O. Pagrati	–	Anatolia	85 – 78

== Final rounds ==
Quarterfinals; 3 November 2018
Kymi	74
Peristeri	73
PAOK	82
AEK	80
Olympiacos	84
Kolossos H Hotels	53
Promitheas	68
Panathinaikos OPAP	76

Semifinals; 13 February 2019
Kymi	61
PAOK	72
Panathinaikos OPAP	20
Olympiacos	0

Final; 17 February 2019
PAOK	73
Panathinaikos OPAP	79

Note: Olympiacos decided to forfeit their semifinals game versus Panathinaikos at halftime, over reffing disputes.

Greek Basketball Cup Finals
44th Final
17 February 2019 – Heraklion Indoor Sports Arena

Panathinaikos – PAOK 79–73 (46–36), Quarters: 29–15, 46–36, 59–58, 79–73. Referees: Papapetrou, Karakatsounis, Tsarouchas

Panathinaikos (Pitino): Calathes 19, Langford 17, Gist 14, Thomas 12, Papapetrou 10, Antetokounmpo 5, Mitoglou 2, Payne, Kilpatrick, Lekavičius, Vougioukas, Papagiannis

PAOK (Papatheodorou): Hatcher 23, Goss 15, Margaritis 13, Garrett 10, Jones 9, Zaras 3, Jefferson, Tepić, Chrysikopoulos, Koniaris, Tsochlas, Schizas

== Awards ==
=== Finals Most Valuable Player ===
Player	Team
(Greece) Nick Calathes	Panathinaikos

=== Finals Top Scorer ===
Player	Team
(United States) Will Hatcher	PAOK
