= Nikos Persidis =

Greek basketball player (born 1995)

Nikos Persidis Νίκος Περσίδης
- Persidis in action with AEK Athens

No. 18 – PAOK Thessaloniki
- Position: Small forward / power forward
- League: Greek Basketball League; EuroCup

Personal information
- Born: September 8, 1995 (age 31) Chalkida, Greece
- Listed height: 6 ft 7 in (2.01 m)
- Listed weight: 216 lb (98 kg)

Career information
- NBA draft: 2017: undrafted
- Playing career: 2011–present

Career history
- 2011–2013: AGE Chalkida
- 2013–2014: Ikaros Chalkidas
- 2014–2015: Psychiko
- 2015–2016: Pagrati
- 2016–2017: Ionikos Nikaias
- 2017–2018: Ethnikos Piraeus
- 2018–2019: Diagoras Dryopideon
- 2019–2020: Panathinaikos
- 2020–2022: Lavrio
- 2022: AEK Athens
- 2022–2023: Peristeri
- 2023–2024: Aris Thessaloniki
- 2024–present: PAOK Thessaloniki

Career highlights
- Greek League champion (2020)

Nikolaos Persidis (Greek: Νικόλαος "Νίκος" Περσίδης; born September 8, 1995) is a Greek professional basketball player for PAOK Thessaloniki of the Greek Basketball League (GBL) and EuroCup He is a 2.01 metres (6 feet 7 inches) tall forward.

== Professional career ==
Persidis began his club career, while still being a student, in 2011, with the Greek club AGE Chalkida. In 2013, Ikaros Chalkidas's head coach Georgios Kalafatakis, picked him to join the team that year. In that season, the club played in Chalkida, instead of its regular home of Kallithea. Persidis then spent a season with the Greek club Psychiko Athens. After that, he played with the Greek clubs Pagrati Athens and Ionikos Nikaias. With Ionikos Nikaias, he started to receive major playing time.

For the 2017–18 season, Persidis moved to Ethnikos Piraeus, which he helped to lead to the Greek 2nd division's playoffs. During that season, he appeared in 32 games, and he averaged 5.6 points and 4.3 rebounds, in 18 minutes played per game. In the following season, Persidis played with the Greek 2nd division club Diagoras Dryopideon. With Diagoras, he appeared in 29 games, and averaged 6.2 points and 4 rebounds, in 16.5 minutes played per game.

Persidis' performances with Diagoras were noticed by the coaching and scouting staff of the Greek EuroLeague club Panathinaikos Athens. Eventually, Persidis joined the "Greens" team in the summer of 2019. He was primarily signed by the team to be used as an ancillary practice squad player, along with Kostas Papadakis, who would also have a similar role on the team.

On December 26, 2020, Persidis moved to Lavrio for the rest of the season. In 15 games, he averaged 2 points and 1.3 rebounds in under 10 minutes per contest. In 23 league games during the 2021-22 campaign, Persidis averaged an improved 4.5 points and 2.2 rebounds, playing around 15 minutes per contest.

On July 13, 2022, Persidis signed a one-year contract with AEK Athens. On December 15, 2022, Persidis' contract was terminated by mutual consent. Two days later, he signed with Peristeri Athens for the rest of the season. In 17 domestic Greek league games, he averaged 1.5 points and 1 rebound, while playing around 8 minutes per contest.

On July 4, 2023, Persidis signed a two-year deal with Aris Thessaloniki. On July 11, 2024, he was released from Aris.

In 2024, he joined PAOK. On 4 July 2025, he renewed his contract for the 2025–26 season. In July 2026, Persidis extended his contract with PAOK through 2028.

== National team career ==
Persidis was selected to the Greek national 3x3 team for the 2018 Mediterranean Games, which took place in Tarragona, Spain.
