= 2018–19 Greek A2 Basket League =

Greek A2 Basket League
- Season: 2018–19
- Dates: 6 October 2018 – 22 May 2019
- Teams: 16

Regular season
- Promoted: Ionikos Nikaias; Iraklis Thessaloniki
- Relegated: Ethnikos Piraeus; Evropi 87 Pefkohoriou; Kavala; Maroussi

Finals
- Champions: Ionikos Nikaias (1st title)

Statistical leaders
Points	(Greece) Loukas Mavrokefalidis	20.4
Rebounds	(Greece) Loukas Mavrokefalidis	9.1
Assists	(Greece) Fotis Vasilopoulos	8.8

The 2018–19 Greek A2 Basket League was the 33rd season of the Greek A2 Basket League, the second-tier level professional club basketball league in Greece. It was the fourth season with the participation of 16 teams. Playoff and play-out games were also held, for a fourth consecutive season. Ionikos Nikaias clinched the championship by winning the regular season. Along with the playoffs winners Iraklis, they were automatically promoted to the 2019–20 Greek Basket League.

== Teams ==
2018–19 Greek A2 Basket League season club locations.

Club	City	Arena	Capacity
Amyntas	Athens (Dafni-Ymittos, Dafni)	Pyrkal Ymittos Indoor Hall	600
Apollon Patras	Patras	Apollon Patras Indoor Hall	3,500
Charilaos Trikoupis	Missolonghi	Missolonghi Indoor Hall	800
Diagoras Dryopideon	Athens (Aigaleo)	Stavros Venetis Indoor Hall	2,000
Ermis Agias	Larissa (Agia)	Agias Indoor Sports Arena	300
Ethnikos Piraeus	Athens (Piraeus)	Panagiotis Salpeas Hall	1,000
Evropi 87 Pefkohoriou	Pefkochori	Nea Moudania Indoor Hall	200
Ippokratis Kos	Kos	Kos Indoor Hall	250
Iraklis Thessaloniki	Thessaloniki	Ivanofeio Sports Arena	2,500
Ionikos Nikaias	Athens (Nikaia)	Platonas Indoor Hall	1,200
Kavala	Kavala	Kalamitsa Indoor Hall	1,650
Karditsas	Karditsa	Karditsa Municipal Sports Center	550
Kastoria	Kastoria	Dimitris Diamantidis Indoor Hall	650
Koroivos	Amaliada	Amaliada Ilida Indoor Hall	2,000
Maroussi	Athens (Marousi)	Maroussi Indoor Hall	1,700
Psychiko	Athens (Psychiko)	Psychiko Indoor Hall	300

== Regular season ==
Pos	Team	Pld	W	L	PF	PA	PD	Qualification or relegation
1	Ionikos Nikaias (C, P)	30	27	3	2920	2164	+756	Promotion to the Greek Basket League
2	Iraklis Thessaloniki (O, P)	30	24	6	2410	2020	+390	Qualification for promotion playoffs
3	Karditsas	30	17	13	2271	2218	+53	Qualification for promotion playoffs
4	Kastoria	30	17	13	2068	1987	+81	Qualification for promotion playoffs
5	Charilaos Trikoupis	30	17	13	2202	2137	+65	Qualification for promotion playoffs
6	Diagoras Dryopideon	30	17	13	2427	2248	+179	
7	Ermis Agias	30	17	13	2352	2354	−2	
8	Ippokratis Kos	30	16	14	2186	2293	−107	
9	Amyntas	30	15	15	2078	2100	−22	
10	Psychiko	30	15	15	2187	2170	+17	
11	Apollon Patras (O)	30	14	16	2093	2123	−30	Qualification for relegation playoffs
12	Koroivos (O)	30	13	17	2199	2195	+4	Qualification for relegation playoffs
13	Maroussi (R)	30	10	20	2219	2399	−180	Qualification for relegation playoffs
14	Kavala (R)	30	10	20	2121	2316	−195	Qualification for relegation playoffs
15	Evropi 87 Pefkohoriou (R)	30	10	20	1981	2287	−306	Relegation to Greek B League
16	Ethnikos Piraeus (R)	30	1	29	2231	2934	−703	Relegation to Greek B League

Source: Eurobasket.com
(C) Champions; (O) Play-off winners; (P) Promoted; (R) Relegated

== Promotion playoffs ==
Semi-finals
2 Iraklis Thessaloniki	1
5 Charilaos Trikoupis	0
3 Karditsas	0
4 Kastoria	2

Final
2 Iraklis Thessaloniki	1
4 Kastoria	0

== Relegation playoffs ==
Final
11 Apollon Patras	55	62	78
14 Kavala	37	73	60

Final
12 Koroivos	76	61	76
13 Maroussi	64	66	60

== See also ==
- 2018–19 Greek Basketball Cup
- 2018–19 Greek Basket League (1st tier)
