= 2019–20 Greek Basketball Cup =

2019–20 Greek Cup
- Season: 2019–20
- Duration: 18 September 2019 – 16 February 2020
- Teams: 62

Finals
- Champions: AEK (5th title)
- Runners-up: Promitheas
- Finals MVP: (Greece) Nikos Zisis

The 2019–20 Greek Basketball Cup was the 45th edition of Greek top-tier level professional domestic basketball cup competition. The previous winner of the cup was Panathinaikos. The cup competition started on 18 September 2019 and ended on 16 February 2020. AEK won the competition.

== Format ==
The top six placed teams from the top-tier level Greek Basket League's 2018–19 season, gained an automatic bye to the 2019–20 Greek Cup quarterfinals. While the eight lower-placed teams from the 2018–19 Greek Basket League season; along with all of the teams from the 2nd-tier level Greek A2 Basket League's 2018–19 season, and the 3rd-tier level Greek B Basket League's 2018–19 season, played in preliminary rounds, competing for the other two quarterfinals places. All rounds were played under a single elimination format.

== Preliminary rounds ==
=== Phase 1 ===
==== Round 1 ====
Ethnikos Piraeus	70 – 64	Megaridas
Aigaleo	84 – 98	Pentelis
Ionikos NF	79 – 81	Doukas
Papagou	73 – 68	Panerithraikos
Proteas Voulas	84 – 65	OFI Crete
Esperos Kallitheas	72 – 49	Maroussi
Panelefsiniakos	73 – 68	Melissia
Lokros Atalantis	64 – 77	Mandraikos
Stratoniou	93 – 83	Giannina
Farsalon	73 – 44	Europi 87
HANTH	68 – 83	Machites Doxas Pefkon
Doxa Lefkadas	71 – 62	Gefyras
Komotini	66 – 73	Ermis Lagkada
Eukarpias	74 – 83	Aias Evosmou
Esperos Lamias	89 – 76	Filippos Verias
Proteas Grevena	56 – 68	Kavala

==== Round 2 ====
Esperos Lamias	77 – 94	Koroivos Amaliadas
Panelefsiniakos	63 – 111	Diagoras Dryopideon
Pentelis	60 – 76	Anatolia Thessaloniki
Esperos Kallitheas	74 – 79	Psychiko
Doukas	49 – 85	Charilaos Trikoupis
Doxa Lefkadas	65 – 82	Pagrati
Papagou	62 – 58	Apollon Patras
Farsalon	20 – 0	Ippokratis Kos
Ethnikos Piraeus	60 – 73	Amyntas
Machites Doxas Pefkon	56 – 90	Karditsas
Proteas Voulas	73 – 79	Dafni Dafniou
Kavala	81 – 71	Agriniou
Stratoniou	73 – 88	Eleftheroupolis
Aias Evosmou	60 – 45	Triton Athens
Ermis Lagkada	58 – 64	Olympiacos B
Mandraikos	83 – 82	Oiakas Nafpliou

Note: Ippokratis Kos decided to forfeit their game against Farsalon.

==== Round 3 ====
Olympiacos B	76 – 91	Anatolia Thessaloniki
Koroivos Amaliadas	93 – 89	Pagrati
Papagou	77 – 66	Aias Evosmou
Karditsas	93 – 96	Amyntas
Kavala	80 – 87	Dafni Dafniou
Farsalon	64 – 91	Charilaos Trikoupis
Mandraikos	65 – 59	Psychiko
Eleftheroupolis	71 – 77	Diagoras Dryopideon

=== Phase 2 ===
==== Round 1 ====
Ionikos Nikaias	73 – 79	Kolossos Rodou
Mandraikos	56 – 79	Lavrio
Anatolia Thessaloniki	67 – 77	Larisa
Dafni Dafniou	87 – 76	Koroivos Amaliadas
Aris Thessaloniki	63 – 64	Iraklis Thessaloniki
Papagou	62 – 81	Rethymno
Charilaos Trikoupis	71 – 80	Panionios
Diagoras Dryopideon	90 – 73	Amyntas

==== Round 2 ====
Diagoras Dryopideon	93 – 72	Panionios
Kolossos Rodou	73 – 56	Lavrio
Dafni Dafniou	63 – 83	Larisa
Rethymno	81 – 70	Iraklis

==== Round 3 ====
Rethymno	75 – 65	Kolossos Rodou
Diagoras Dryopideon	95 – 75	Larisa

== Final rounds ==
Quarterfinals; 10 November 2019
Diagoras Dryopideon	81
PAOK	66
AEK	71
Rethymno	61
Promitheas Patras	81
Panathinaikos	79
Peristeri	57
Ifaistos Limnou	51

Semifinals; 12 February 2020
Diagoras Dryopideon	71
AEK	89
Promitheas Patras	67
Peristeri	61

Final; 16 February 2020
AEK	61
Promitheas	57

Greek Basketball Cup Final
45th Final
16 February 2020 – Heraklion Indoor Sports Arena

AEK – Promitheas Patras 61–57 (29–26), Quarters: 12–13, 29–26, 43–38, 61–57. Referees: Schinas, Anastopoulos, Karakatsounis

AEK (Papatheodorou): Ray 16, Zisis 11, Mačiulis 9, Giannopoulos 6, Slaughter 5, Janković 4, Toliopoulos 3, Chalmers 3, Chrysikopoulos 2, Grant 2, Rogkavopoulos, Mavroeidis.

Promitheas Patras (Giatras): Kaselakis 15, Mavrokefalidis 11, Hall 9, Babb 8, Lypovyy 7, Mantzaris 3, Agravanis 2, Fieler 2, Katsivelis, Jones, Bell, Mantzoukas.

== Awards ==
=== Finals Most Valuable Player ===
Player	Team
(Greece) Nikos Zisis	AEK

=== Finals Top Scorer ===
Player	Team
(United States) Kendrick Ray	AEK
