= 2017–18 Greek A2 Basket League =

Greek A2 Basket League
- Season: 2017–18
- Dates: 7 October 2017 – 26 May 2018
- Teams: 16

Regular season
- Promoted: Peristeri; Holargos
- Relegated: Arkadikos; Papagou; AEL; Doukas

Finals
- Champions: Peristeri (3rd title)

Statistical leaders
Points	(Greece) Alexis Kyritsis	22.8
Rebounds	(Greece) Petros Melissaratos	9.8
Assists	(Greece) Thomas Nikou	9.8

The 2017–18 Greek A2 Basket League was the 32nd season of the Greek A2 Basket League, the second-tier level professional club basketball league in Greece. It was the third season with the participation of 16 teams. Playoff and play out games were also held, for a third consecutive season. Peristeri clinched the championship four games before the end of the regular season. Together with the playoffs winners Holargos, they were promoted to the 2018–19 Greek Basket League.

== Teams ==
2017–18 Greek A2 Basket League season club locations.

Club	City	Arena	Capacity
AEL	Larissa	Larissa Neapolis Indoor Arena	4,000
Amyntas	Athens (Dafni-Ymittos, Dafni)	Pyrkal Ymittos Indoor Hall	600
Apollon Patras	Patras	Apollon Patras Indoor Hall	3,500
Arkadikos	Tripoli	Tripoli Indoor Hall	1,000
Doukas	Athens (Marousi)	Dais Gymnasium	1,200
Doxa Lefkadas	Lefkada	Lefkada Indoor Hall	1,200
Ermis Agias	Larissa (Agia)	Agias Indoor Sports Arena	300
Ethnikos Piraeus	Athens (Piraeus)	Panagiotis Salpeas Hall	1,000
Holargos	Athens (Cholargos)	Antonis Tritsis Indoor Hall	1,665
Iraklis Thessaloniki	Thessaloniki	Ivanofeio Sports Arena	2,500
Karditsas	Karditsa	Karditsa Municipal Sports Center	550
Kastoria	Kastoria	Dimitris Diamantidis Indoor Hall	650
Maroussi	Athens (Marousi)	Maroussi Indoor Hall	1,700
Papagou	Athens (Papagou)	Saloon Indoor Hall	800
Peristeri	Athens (Peristeri)	Peristeri Indoor Hall	4,000
Psychiko	Athens (Psychiko)	Psychiko Indoor Hall	300

== Regular season ==
Pos	Team	Pld	W	L	PF	PA	PD	Qualification or relegation
1	Peristeri (C, P)	29	28	1	2452	1948	+504	Promotion to the Greek Basket League
2	Holargos (O, P)	29	24	5	2329	2001	+328	Qualification for promotion playoffs
3	Iraklis Thessaloniki	29	22	7	2345	2148	+197	Qualification for promotion playoffs
4	Apollon Patras	29	20	9	2337	2167	+170	Qualification for promotion playoffs
5	Ethnikos Piraeus	29	16	13	2185	2140	+45	Qualification for promotion playoffs
6	Doxa Lefkadas	29	15	14	2166	2190	−24	
7	Amyntas	29	15	14	2066	2050	+16	
8	Ermis Agias	28	15	13	1976	2063	−87	
9	Kastoria	29	13	16	2101	2033	+68	
10	Karditsa	29	13	16	2044	2046	−2	
11	Psychiko (O)	29	13	16	2060	2027	+33	Qualification for relegation playoffs
12	Maroussi (O)	29	10	19	1962	2126	−164	Qualification for relegation playoffs
13	Papagou (R)	29	9	20	2267	2449	−182	Qualification for relegation playoffs
14	Arkadikos (R)	29	7	22	2117	2399	−282	Qualification for relegation playoffs
15	Doukas (R)	29	7	22	2256	2521	−265	Relegation to Greek B League
16	AEL (R)	29	3	26	2065	2489	−424	Relegation to Greek B League

Source: Eurobasket.com
(C) Champions; (O) Play-off winners; (P) Promoted; (R) Relegated

== Promotion playoffs ==
In the promotion playoffs, best-of-five playoff series were played. The higher-seeded team hosted the Game 1, Game 2 and Game 5 (if necessary) at home.

Semi-finals
2 Holargos	3
5 Ethnikos Piraeus	2
3 Iraklis Thessaloniki	1
4 Apollon Patras	3

Final
2 Holargos	3
4 Apollon Patras	0

== Relegation playoffs ==
Final
11 Psychiko	70	82
14 Arkadikos	62	66

Final
12 Maroussi	71	74
13 Papagou	62	72

== See also ==
- 2017–18 Greek Basketball Cup
- 2017–18 Greek Basket League (1st tier)
