= Dimitris Gravas =

Greek basketball player (born 1993)

Vikos Falcons
- Position: Small forward / power forward
- League: Greek Elite League

Personal information
- Born: May 12, 1993 (age 33) Larissa, Greece
- Listed height: 6 ft 8 in (2.03 m)
- Listed weight: 230 lb (104 kg)

Career information
- NBA draft: 2015: undrafted
- Playing career: 2014–present

Career history
- 2014–2016: Machites Doxas Pefkon
- 2016–2017: Promitheas Patras
- 2017–2018: Doxa Lefkadas
- 2018–2020: ASK Karditsas
- 2020–2021: Charilaos Trikoupis
- 2021–2022: ASK Karditsas
- 2022–2023: Eleftheroupoli
- 2023–2024: Ermis Schimatariou
- 2024–present: Vikos Falcons

Career highlights
- Greek 2nd Division champion (2022)

Dimitris Gravas (alternate spellings: Dimitrios, Dimitreios) (Greek: Δημήτρης Γράβας; born May 12, 1993) is a Greek professional basketball player for Vikos Falcons Ioannina of the Greek Elite League.

== Professional career ==
After spending one year in the Greek minors with Mantoulidis, Gravas joined Machites Doxas Pefkon, where he played in both the Greek 3rd Division and in the Greek 2nd Division. In 2016, he joined the newly promoted to the Greek Basket League (1st Division) club Promitheas Patras.

Due to the limited playing time that he had with Promitheas, he left the team and joined AEL 1964, of the Greek 2nd Division. However, he never played with AEL, and he eventually joined the Greek club Doxa Lefkadas, for the rest of the 2017–18 season. With Doxa Lefkadas, he went on to average 4 points, 2.1 rebounds and 0.6 steals per game.

Gravas subsequently had a breakthrough couple of seasons with the Greek 2nd Division club Karditsa, as he averaged 10.2 points and 4.3 rebounds per game during the 2018–19 season, and 15.2 points, 7.0 rebounds and 2.4 assists per game during the 2019–20 season. On August 14, 2020, Gravas signed with the newly promoted to the Greek Basket League club Charilaos Trikoupis.
