= Diagoras Dryopideon Aigaleo B.C. =

Diagoras Dryopideon Aigaleo
- Nickname: "The Aigaleo Greens"
- Founded: 1996
- History: 1996 – Present
- Arena: Aigaleo Stavros Venetis Indoor Hall
- Capacity: 2,000
- Location: Aigaleo, Athens, Greece
- Team colors: Green and White
- Championships: Greek 4th Division: (1)
Home	Away

Diagoras Dryopideon Aigaleo B.C. (alternate spelling: Egaleo) (Greek: Διαγόρας Δρυοπιδέων Αιγάλεω) was a Greek professional basketball team that was located in Aigaleo, Greece, which is a suburb of Athens. It was a part of the multi sports club Athlitikos Syllogos Diagoras Dryopideon Aigaleo (Greek: Αθλητικός Σύλλογος Διαγόρας Δρυοπιδέων Αιγάλεω).

== History ==
The club's parent athletic association, A.S. Diagoras Dryopideon Aigaleo (Α.Σ. Διαγόρας Δρυοπιδέων Αιγάλεω) was founded in 1967. The founders have roots from Kythnos which has the name Dryopis during the ancient times. The men's basketball section of the club was founded in 1996.

After competing for many years in local and regional leagues in Greece, Diagoras Dryopideon played in a Greek national league for the first time, in the 2014–15 season, when the club competed in Greece's national minor league, the Greek 4th Division.

During the 2016–17 season, Diagoras won the Greek 4th Division's 2nd Group, and thus earned a league promotion to the Greek 3rd Division, for the following 2017–18 season. Diagoras finished second in the Greek 3rd Division's 1st Group, in the 2017–18 season, and thus earned a league promotion to the Greek 2nd Division, for the 2018–19 season. The club also made it to the last 16 stage of the 2018–19 Greek Cup tournament, where they lost to AEK Athens, by a score of 76–54.

In the 2019–20 Greek Cup tournament, Diagoras made it to the semifinals of the Greek Cup, where they again lost to AEK Athens, by a score of 89–71. In the Greek 2nd Division's 2019–20 season, Diagoras finished in second place in the league, behind Charilaos Trikoupis, and earned a league promotion up to the top-tier level Greek Basket League, for the following 2020–21 season. However, Diagoras declined to take their place in the league.

== Arena ==
Diagoras Dryopideon plays its home games at the 2,000 seat Aigaleo Stavros Venetis Indoor Hall.

== Season by season ==
Season	[[Greek basketball league system|Tier]]	League	Pos.	W–L	[[Greek Basketball Cup|Greek Cup]]	[[Greek basketball clubs in European and worldwide competitions|European competitions]]
2014–15	4	C Basket League	10th	11–15		
2015–16	5	ESKA1				
2016–17	4	C Basket League	1st	16–1		
2017–18	3	B Basket League	2nd	22–8	First Round	
2018–19	2	A2 Basket League	6th	17–13	Last 16	
2019–20*	2	A2 Basket League	(2nd)*	16-5	Semifinals	

* In the 2019–20 season, Olympiacos B Development Team had the 2nd best record in the Greek A2 Basket League's regular season, at 17–4, but they were deducted a total of 6 points (3 wins) by the Hellenic Basketball Federation. That was due to a punishment of the senior club of Olympiacos, for its forfeiting of several Greek Basket League and Greek Cup games, during the previous 2018–19 season. As a result, Olympiacos B Development Team was placed below Diagoras Dryopideon (16–5 record), in the Greek A2 Basket League's 2019–20 season standings. Finally, Diagoras sold its licence to Ionikos Nikaias

== Titles and honors ==
=== Domestic competitions ===
- Greek 2nd Division

Runner-up (1): (2020)

- Greek 3rd Division

Runner-up (1): (2018)

- Greek 4th Division

Champion (1): (2017)

== Notable players ==
Note: Flags indicate national team eligibility at FIBA-sanctioned events. Players may hold other non-FIBA nationalities not displayed.

Criteria

To appear in this section a player must have either:

- Set a club record or won an individual award while at the club
- Played at least one official international match for their national team at any time
- Played at least one official NBA match at any time.

- (Greece) Georgios Galiotis
- (Greece) Vangelis Karampoulas
- (Greece) Dimitris Katiakos
- (Greece) Nikos Kokkalis
- (Greece) Georgios Koukas
- (Greece) Nikos Liakopoulos
- (Greece) Kostas Macheras
- (Greece) Nikos Makris
- (Greece) Spyros Motsenigos
- (Greece) Thomas Nikou
- (Greece) Petros Noeas
- (Greece) Nikos Persidis
- (Greece) Christos Petrodimopoulos
- (Greece) Nikos Pettas
- (Greece) Michalis Polytarchou
