= Nikos Pettas =

Greek basketball player

Nikos Pettas Νίκος Πέττας
Milon

Personal information
- Born: February 28, 1981 (age 45) Athens, Greece
- Listed height: 6 ft 4.75 in (1.95 m)
- Listed weight: 220 lb (100 kg)

Career information
- Playing career: 1998–present
- Position: Shooting guard / small forward

Career history
- 1998–2001: Olympiacos
- 2001–2003: Apollon Patras
- 2003–2004: Irakleio
- 2004–2006: Apollon Patras
- 2006–2007: Aigaleo
- 2007–2008: Olympias Patras
- 2008–2009: Trikala 2000
- 2009–2010: Olympias Patras
- 2010–2011: Koroivos Amaliadas
- 2011–2012: Doxa Lefkadas
- 2012–2014: Psychiko
- 2014–2017: Promitheas Patras
- 2017–2018: Diagoras Dryopideon
- 2018–2019: Ionikos NF
- 2019–2020: Ethnikos Piraeus
- 2020–present: Milon

Career highlights
- 2× Greek 3rd Division Top Scorer (2013, 2015); Greek 2nd Division Top Scorer (2014); Greek 2nd Division champion (2003)
Medals
Men's basketball
Representing Greece
FIBA Europe U-18 Championship
Bronze medal – third place	1998 Bulgaria	Under-18

Nikolaos "Nikos" Pettas (Greek: Νικόλαος "Νίκος" Πέττας; born February 28, 1981) is a Greek professional basketball player. He is a 6 ft 4 3/4 in (1.95 m) tall shooting guard-small forward.

== Professional career ==
Pettas began playing basketball with the junior teams of Olympiacos. With the senior men's team of Olympiacos, he played in the 1997 McDonald's Championship Final, against the Chicago Bulls. The first season of his pro career, was in the Greek League, during the 1998–99 season. He played in the European-wide 3rd-tier level FIBA EuroChallenge, during the 2007–08 season, with Olympias Patras.

== National team career ==
Pettas was a member of the junior national teams of Greece. With Greece's junior national teams, he played at the following tournaments: the 1997 FIBA Europe Under-16 Championship, the 1998 FIBA Europe Under-18 Championship, where he won a bronze medal, the 1999 FIBA Under-19 World Championship, and the 2000 FIBA Europe Under-20 Championship.
