= Thomas Nikou =

Greek basketball player

Personal information
- Born: 25 June 1980 (age 46) Arta, Greece
- Listed height: 6 ft 1 in (1.85 m)
- Listed weight: 215 lb (98 kg)

Career information
- Playing career: 2005–present
- Position: Point guard

Career history
- 2005–2006: Alimos
- 2006–2009: Near East
- 2009–2010: Kavala
- 2010–2014: Panelefsiniakos
- 2014–2018: Psychiko
- 2018–2019: Diagoras Dryopideon
- 2019: Pagrati
- 2019–2020: Olympiacos B
- 2020–present: Eleftheroupoli

Thomas Nikou (Greek: Θωμάς Νίκου; born 25 June 1980) is a Greek professional basketball player for Eleftheroupoli of the Greek A2 Basket League. He is a 1.85 m (6 ft 1 in) tall point guard.

== Professional career ==
After playing in the Greek minor leagues, Nikou began his pro career in the 2005–06 season, with the Greek 2nd Division club Alimos. He made his debut in the top-tier level Greek 1st Division, in the 2009–10 season, with Kavala. He joined Olympiacos' new reserve team of the Greek 2nd Division, Olympiacos B, for the 2019–20 season.

== Personal life ==
While working as a police officer, Nikou was shot in the mouth, during a bank robbery, on 9 June 2006.
