= Andronikos Gizogiannis =

Greek basketball player

Andronikos Gizogiannis Ανδρόνικος Γκιζογιαννης
Telethriakos B.C
- Position: Power forward / center
- League: Greek C League

Personal information
- Born: February 8, 1983 (age 43) Athens, Greece
- Listed height: 6 ft 8 in (2.03 m)
- Listed weight: 243 lb (110 kg)

Career information
- Playing career: 2009–present

Career history
- 2001–2005: AGE Chalkida
- 2005–2007: Apollon Patras
- 2007–2008: Olympia Larissa
- 2008–2009: Aigaleo
- 2009–2010: AEK Athens
- 2010–2011: AEK Argous
- 2011–2012: Arkadikos
- 2012–2014: AEK Athens
- 2014–2016: Ethnikos Piraeus
- 2016–2019: Aiolos Astakos
- 2019–2020: Telethriakos B.C

Career highlights
- Greek 2nd Division champion (2014)
Medals
Men's basketball
Representing Greece
FIBA Europe Under-16 Championship
Silver medal – second place	1999 Slovenia	Under-16
FIBA Europe Under-20 Championship
Gold medal – first place	2002 Lithuania	Under-20
World Military Championship
Gold medal – first place	2009 Lithuania

Andronikos Gizogiannis (Greek: Ανδρόνικος Γκιζογιαννης; born 1983) is a Greek professional basketball player. He is 2.03 m (6 ft 8 in) in height and he can play at the power forward and center positions. He is currently playing with Telethriakos Istiaias B.C, Telethriakos.

== Professional career ==
Gizogiannis started his pro career with AGE Chalkida (2001–05). He then played with Apollon Patras (2005–07), Olympia Larissa (2007–08), Aigaleo (2008–09), AEK Athens (2009–10), AEK Argous (2010–11), Arkadikos (2011–12), and in August 2012, he returned to AEK Athens. In the summer of 2014, he moved to Ethnikos Piraeus.

== National team career ==
- 1999 FIBA Europe Under-16 Championship: Silver
- 2002 FIBA Europe Under-20 Championship: Gold
- 2009 World Military Championship in Klaipėda, Lithuania: Gold
