= Dimitris Cheilaris =

Greek basketball player

Dimitris Cheilaris Δημήτρης Χείλαρης
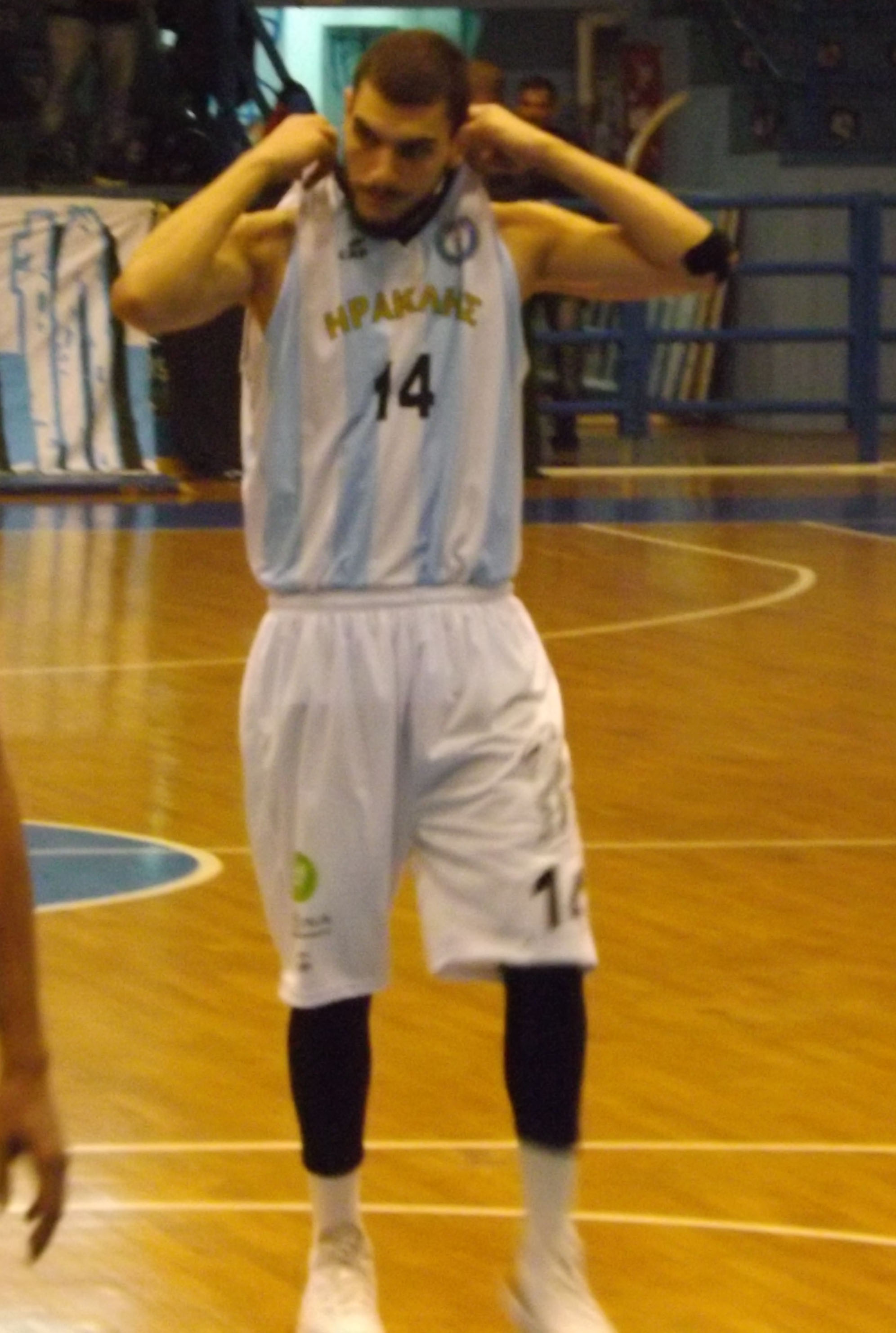
- Cheilaris playing for Iraklis Thessaloniki in 2016.

Apollon Patras
- Position: Power forward

Personal information
- Born: August 18, 1990 (age 36) Leonidio, Greece
- Listed height: 2.06 m (6 ft 9 in)

Career information
- Playing career: 2012–present

Career history
- 2011–2012: Amyntas
- 2012–2014: Filathlitikos
- 2014–2015: Rethymno
- 2015–2017: Iraklis Thessaloniki
- 2017–2018: Apollon Patras
- 2018–2019: Koroivos Amaliadas
- 2019–2020: Larisa
- 2021–2022: Charilaos Trikoupis
- 2022–2023: Doxa Lefkadas
- 2023–2024: Vikos Falcons
- 2024: Anagenisi Arkalochori
- 2024–2025: Esperos Lamias
- 2025–present: Apollon Patras

Dimitris Cheilaris (Greek: Δημήτρης Χείλαρης, Greek pronunciation: [ði'mitɾis 'çilaɾis]; born August 18, 1990) is a Greek professional basketball player who last played for Charilaos Trikoupis of the Greek A2 Basket League. Born in Leonidio, he started his professional career with Amyntas. Subsequently, he moved to Filathlitikos, where he was a teammate with Giannis Antetokounmpo. He played one season of top-tier basketball with Rethymno BC, before returning to the second-tier to play for Iraklis Thessaloniki.

He has represented Greece at youth level and has won the bronze medal in the 2015 World Military Basketball Championship.

== Professional career ==
Cheilaris started playing basketball in Leonidio BC, the team of his hometown. In 2011 he transferred to Amyntas of the Greek A2, thus starting his professional career. In 2012 he moved to Filathlitikos, playing alongside Giannis Antetokounmpo. In his first season with the team he only appeared in 8 games averaging 4.9 points and 2 rebounds per game. After both Giannis and Thanasis Antetokounmpo left Filathlitikos the following season, Cheilaris appeared in all 26 games averaging 12.3 points and 4.6 rebounds on 29.9 minutes per game.

Following the relegation of Filathlitikos on 2014, Cheilaris signed a contract with Rethymno BC of the Greek Basket League. In October 2015, he moved to Greek A2 team Iraklis Thessaloniki. In December 2015, Cheilaris was involved in a fight with fans of Iraklis, after a home loss of Iraklis from Pagrati. Later, he released a press statement expressing his regret for the incident. At the end of the season he was among the team's top performers with 12.4 points, 5.0 rebounds and 1.5 steals per game.

== National team career ==
Cheilaris has represented Greece at the 2006 FIBA Europe Under-16 Championship. Totally, he has appeared in 27 games for various youth squads of Greece averaging 2.5 points per game. Cheilaris was also a member of the Greek squad which won the bronze medal in the 2015 World Military Basketball Championship.
