= Nikos Maragidis =

Greek basketball player

Nikos Maragkidis
Free agent
- Position: Shooting guard / small forward

Personal information
- Born: June 23, 1997 (age 29) Athens, Greece
- Listed height: 6 ft 5 in (1.96 m)
- Listed weight: 186 lb (84 kg)

Career information
- High school: Impact Basketball Academy (Las Vegas, Nevada)
- College: Green Mountain (2015–2016)
- NBA draft: 2018: undrafted
- Playing career: 2018–present

Career history
- 2017–2018: Panionios
- 2018–2019: Ethnikos Piraeus
- 2019: Panionios
- 2019–2021: Ionikos Nikaias

Nikos Maragkidis (alternate spelling: Maragidis) (Greek: Νίκος Μαραγκίδης; born June 23, 1997, in Athens, Greece) is a Greek professional basketball player who last played for Ionikos Nikaias of the Greek Basket League. He is 6 ft 5 in (1.96 m) tall and plays as a swingman.

== High school career ==
Maragkidis played High school basketball with Impact Basketball Academy at Las Vegas, Nevada.

== College career ==
Maragkidis played college basketball at Green Mountain College and at Poultney, Vermont. He stayed for only one year at Green Mountain before returning to Greece.

== Professional career ==
In 2017, after playing with the youth squads of Maroussi and Panionios, Maragkidis began his professional career with the Greek League club Panionios.

The next year, Maragkidis signed with SAM Basket Massagno of the Swiss Basketball League. He left the team in October without appearing in a single game and he returned to Greece, where he joined Ethnikos Piraeus of the Greek 2nd division.

Maragkidis started the 2019–2020 season once more with Panionios and then made a mid-season transfer to fellow Greek Basket League club Ionikos Nikaias. On August 29, 2020, Maragkidis renewed his contract with Ionikos.
