= Fotios Vasilopoulos =

Greek basketball player (born 1986)

Fotios Vasilopoulos Φώτης Βασιλόπουλος
- Vasilopoulos with AEK Athens, playing against Aigaleo.

Free agent
- Position: Point guard

Personal information
- Born: 8 February 1986 (age 40) Athens, Greece
- Listed height: 6 ft 1.75 in (1.87 m)
- Listed weight: 198 lb (90 kg)

Career information
- NBA draft: 2008: undrafted
- Playing career: 2002–present

Career history
- 2002–2004: Panionios
- 2004–2005: AGE Halkida
- 2005–2007: Panionios
- 2007–2008: AGE Halkida
- 2008–2009: AEK Athens
- 2009–2010: Dafni
- 2010–2011: Pagrati
- 2011–2012: AEK Athens
- 2012–2014: Pagrati
- 2014–2015: Panelefsiniakos
- 2015–2016: Ethnikos Piraeus
- 2016–2017: Faros Keratsiniou
- 2017–2019: Ionikos Nikaias
- 2019–2020: Charilaos Trikoupis
- 2020–2021: Ethnikos Piraeus
- 2021–2022: Charilaos Trikoupis

Career highlights
- Greek All-Star Game 3-Point Shootout Champion (2006); 2× Greek 2nd Division champion (2019, 2020); 3× Greek 2nd Division assists leader (2016, 2019, 2020); Greek 3rd Division champion (2018)

Fotios Vasilopoulos (alternative spellings: Fotis, Vassilopoulos) (Greek: Φώτης Βασιλόπουλος; born 1986) is a Greek professional basketball player who plays for Ethnikos Piraeus B.C. of the Greek B Basket League. He is 1.87 m (6 ft 1 1/2 in) tall, and he plays at the point guard position.

== Professional career ==
Vasilopoulos started his career with Panionios (2002–04). Then he played for AGE Halkida (2004–05) in the Greek 2nd Division. He then moved back to Panionios (2005–07), before returning to AGE Halkida (2007–08).

He then played with AEK Athens in 2008–09, and then with Dafni (2009–10), and Pagrati (2010–11), before returning again to AEK Athens for the 2011–12 season. Vasilopoulos returned to Pagrati, and he finished first in the Greek 2nd Division in assists, and fourth in points, during the 2013–14 season. In August 2014, Vasilopoulos joined Panelefsiniakos of the Greek Basket League.

For the 2015–16 season, Vasilopoulos played with Ethnikos Piraeus, in the Greek 2nd Division. In September 2016, Vasilopoulos joined Faros Keratsiniou. In 2017, he joined the Greek 3rd Division club Ionikos Nikaias.

For the 2022–23 season, he returned to Ethnikos Piraeus for a third spell at the club.

== National team career ==
Vasilopoulos was a member of the junior national teams of Greece. With Greece's junior national teams, he played at both the 2004 FIBA Europe Under-18 Championship and the 2005 FIBA Europe Under-20 Championship.
