= Velissariou =

Velissariou is a surname. Notable people with the surname include:

- Ioannis Velissariou (1861–1913), Hellenic Army officer
- Petros Velissariou (born 1993), Greek basketball player
