= Nikos Rogkavopoulos =

Greek basketball player (born 2001)

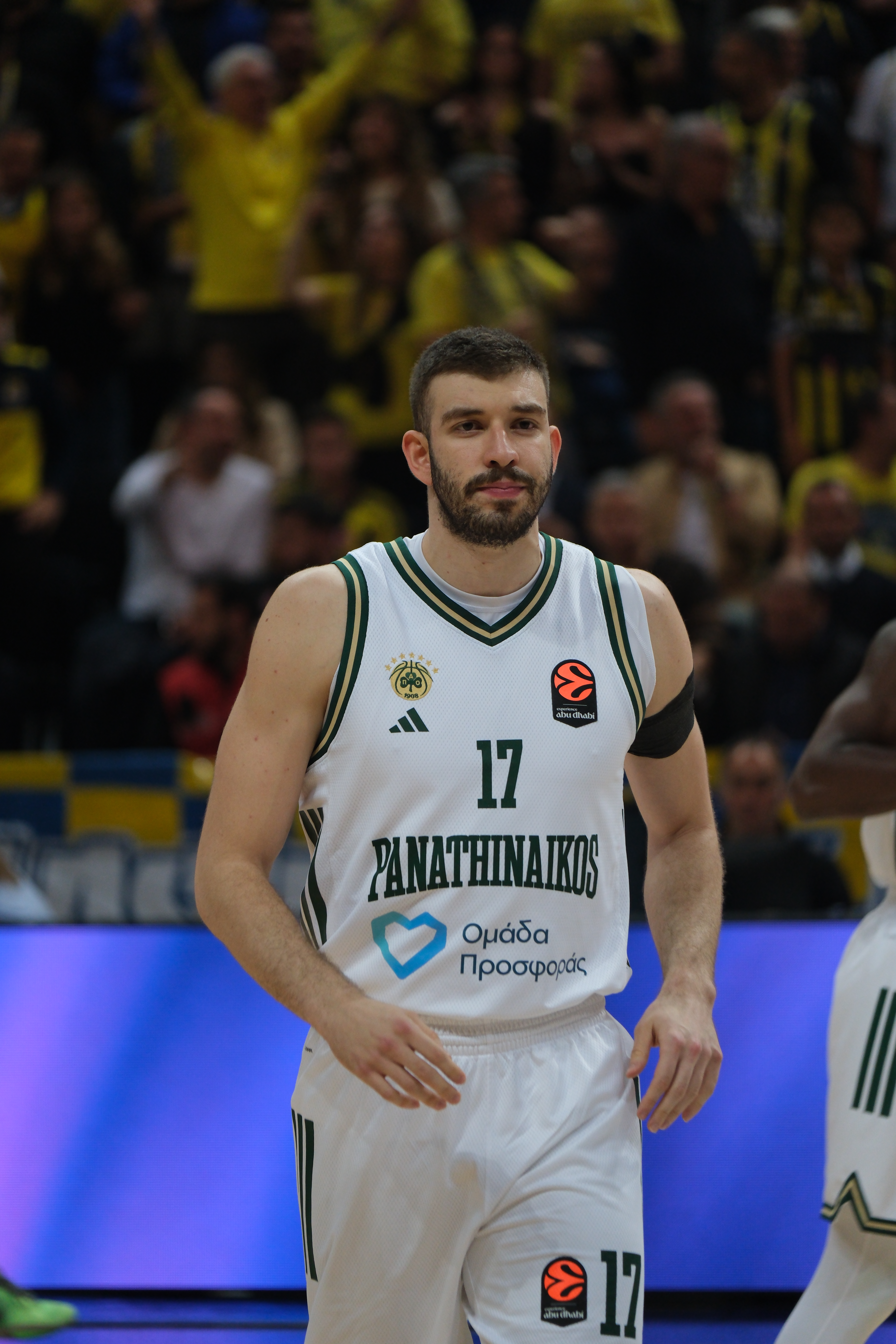
- Rogkavopoulos with Panathinaikos in 2025

No. 17 – Panathinaikos
- Position: Small forward
- League: Greek Basketball League; EuroLeague

Personal information
- Born: June 27, 2001 (age 25) Marousi, Athens, Greece
- Listed height: 6 ft 8 in (2.03 m)
- Listed weight: 200 lb (91 kg)

Career information
- Playing career: 2016–present

Career history
- 2016–2017: Doukas
- 2017–2021: AEK Athens
- 2021–2022: Promitheas Patras
- 2022–2023: Merkezefendi
- 2023–2025: Baskonia
- 2025–present: Panathinaikos

Career highlights
- FIBA Intercontinental Cup champion (2019); 2× Greek Cup winner (2020, 2026); Turkish League Best Young Player (2023); All-Turkish League Second Team (2023); FIBA Europe U-16 Championship B MVP (2017)
Medals
Men's basketball
Representing Greece
FIBA Europe Under-16 Championship Division B
Gold medal – first place	2017 Bulgaria	Under-16

Nikolaos Agapitos Rogkavopoulos (alternate spelling: Rogavopoulos; Greek: Νικόλαος Αγαπητός "Νίκος" Ρογκαβόπουλος; born June 27, 2001) is a Greek professional basketball player for Panathinaikos of the Greek Basketball League and the EuroLeague. He is a 2.03 m (6 ft 8 in) tall small forward.

== Youth career ==
Rogkavopoulos played from a young age with the youth teams of Doukas, before he started his pro career. In 2016, the Spanish club Real Madrid offered Rogkavopoulos an amateur contract, but he decided to stay in Greece, rather than move to Spain. He played at the Jordan Brand Classic's International Game in 2017.

== Professional career ==
Rogkavopoulos made his professional debut with the Greek 2nd Division club Doukas, in a game against Ethnikos Piraeus, in the Greek Cup in 2016. On July 13, 2017, Rogkavopoulos moved to AEK Athens, after he signed a six-year contract with the club, through the 2022–23 season. He spent the 2017–18 season playing with AEK's junior teams, and on the senior team's practice squad.

For the following season, Rogkavopoulos moved up to AEK's senior team, and he made his debut in Greece's top-tier level Greek Basket League (GBL), during the GBL 2018–19 season. He also made his debut in one of the two European-wide secondary level competitions, FIBA's Basketball Champions League (BCL), in the BCL 2018–19 season. With AEK, he won the 2019 edition of the FIBA Intercontinental Cup, and the Greek Cup title, in 2020.

During the 2020–2021 season, Rogkavopoulos had a falling-out with the club due to playing time concerns as well as withheld contract payments, which ended in his suspension from the team for the rest of the season. In the 2021 offseason, all players under contract with AEK were released in order to be renegotiated under new terms, resulting in Rogkavopoulos's free agency.

In April 2020, Rogkavopoulos declared for the 2020 NBA draft.

On July 28, 2021, Rogkavopoulos signed a three-year deal with Promitheas Patras of the Greek Basket League and the EuroCup. In 16 league games, he averaged 6.5 points, 4.3 rebounds and 1.1 assists, playing around 20 minutes per contest. He was quietly suspended for disciplinary reasons in the latter stretch of the season.

Rogkavopoulos spent the 2022–2023 season with Turkish club Merkezefendi, averaging 15.4 points, 4.5 rebounds and 1.8 assists per contest, in 28 domestic league matches.

On July 3, 2023, Rogkavopoulos signed a three-year contract with Basque powerhouse Saski Baskonia, making the jump to the Liga ACB and the EuroLeague. On July 27, 2025, Baskonia officially announced his departure from the club after two seasons.

On July 27, 2025, Nikos Rogkavopoulos signed a four-year contract with Panathinaikos after a buyout agreement was reached with his previous club. The deal was reportedly worth €1 million per season./. At Panathinaikos, Rogkavopoulos is expected to contribute significantly to the team's forward rotation, sharing the small forward position with Cedi Osman. His return to Greece adds a homegrown talent to the EuroLeague powerhouse's roster.

== National team career ==
=== Greek junior national team ===
Rogkavopoulos has been a member of the junior national teams of Greece. With Greece's junior national teams, he played at the 2017 FIBA Europe Under-16 Championship Division B, where he won a gold medal, and was named the MVP of the tournament. During the tournament, he averaged 18.0 points, 6.9 rebounds, 2.4 assists, 1.4 steals, and 0.5 blocks per game.

He also played at the 2018 FIBA Europe Under-18 Championship, where he averaged 19.7 points, 6.6 rebounds, 2.1 assists, 1.4 steals, and 0.1 blocks per game, and at the 2019 FIBA Under-19 World Cup, where he averaged 13.7 points, 4.6 rebounds, 2.4 assists, 0.7 steals, and 0.7 blocks per game. At the 2019 FIBA Europe Under-18 Championship, he made the All-Tournament Team, after averaging 11.7 points, 8.4 rebounds, 2.0 assists, 1.1 steals, and 0.6 blocks per game, during the tournament.

=== Greek senior national team ===
In June 2021, Rogkavopoulos was selected by the Greek senior national team's head coach Rick Pitino to the final 12-man squad for the 2020 FIBA Olympic Qualifying Tournament that took place in Victoria, Canada.

Rogkavopoulos has been absent from subsequent national team call-ups. According to various sources and a February 2025 report, he has a longstanding dispute with Vassilis Liolios, president of the Hellenic Basketball Federation, which Rogkavopoulos claims nearly ended his basketball career during his time at Promitheas Patras B.C. While he has not publicly confirmed that this dispute is the reason for his absences, it has been cited as a possible factor. Vassilis Spanoulis, head coach of the Greek national team, has stated that Rogkavopoulos's absences are due to personal reasons and decisions made by the player himself.

== Career statistics ==
Legend
GP	Games played	GS	Games started	MPG	Minutes per game
FG%	Field-goal percentage	3P%	3-point field-goal percentage	FT%	Free-throw percentage
RPG	Rebounds per game	APG	Assists per game	SPG	Steals per game
BPG	Blocks per game	PPG	Points per game	PIR	Performance index rating
**Bold**	Career high

=== EuroLeague ===
Year	Team	GP	GS	MPG	FG%	3P%	FT%	RPG	APG	SPG	BPG	PPG	PIR
2023–24	Baskonia	29	**6**	13.4	**.500**	**.521**	.773	1.7	.5	**.5**	**.1**	6.1	4.9
2024–25	Baskonia	**33**	2	**18.4**	.471	.435	**.811**	**3.9**	**1.0**	**.5**	**.1**	**9.7**	**9.6**
Career		62	9	16.2	.486	.464	.797	2.9	.7	.5	.1	8.0	7.4

=== EuroCup ===
Year	Team	GP	GS	MPG	FG%	3P%	FT%	RPG	APG	SPG	BPG	PPG	PIR
2021–22	Promitheas Patras	16	13	22.5	.432	.397	.846	5.6	1.4	1.4	.1	8.8	12.0
Career		16	13	22.5	.432	.397	.846	5.6	1.4	1.4	.1	8.8	12.0

=== Basketball Champions League ===
Year	Team	GP	GS	MPG	FG%	3P%	FT%	RPG	APG	SPG	BPG	PPG
2018–19	AEK Athens	2	0	0.8	—	—	—	—	—	—	—	0.0
2019–20	AEK Athens	6	0	8.6	**.478**	**.429**	**.500**	1.0	—	—	—	**4.8**
2020–21	AEK Athens	**10**	**3**	**11.9**	.355	.333	.200	**1.6**	**.3**	**.8**	**.1**	3.0
Career		18	3	9.4	.407	.371	.286	1.2	.2	.4	.1	3.3

=== Domestic leagues ===
Year	Team	League	GP	MPG	FG%	3P%	FT%	RPG	APG	SPG	BPG	PPG
2018–19	(Greece) AEK Athens	GBL	20	4.4	.440	.250	.333	.7	.1	.1	.0	1.3
2019–20	(Greece) AEK Athens	GBL	9	6.3	.500	.250	1.000	1.7	.9	.3	.1	2.1
2020–21	(Greece) AEK Athens	GBL	17	13.5	.368	.429	.667	2.1	.6	.2	.2	4.3
2021–22	(Greece) Promitheas Patras	GBL	16	20.0	.389	.240	.667	4.3	1.1	.4	.1	6.5
2022–23	(Turkey) M. B. Denizli	TBSL	28	32.5	.419	.356	.865	6.2	1.9	1.1	.3	15.5
2023–24	(Spain) Baskonia	ACB	26	16.6	.404	.329	.679	3.2	.7	.6	—	5.1
2024–25	(Spain) Baskonia	ACB	32	19.4	.433	.345	.745	3.3	1.1	.6	.1	8.9

== Honors and awards ==
=== Youth club level ===
- Jordan Brand Classic International Game: (2017)

=== Pro career ===
- FIBA Intercontinental Cup Champion: (2019)
- Greek Cup Winner: (2020, 2026)

=== Greek junior national team ===
- 2017 FIBA Europe Under-16 Championship Division B: Gold
- 2017 FIBA Europe Under-16 Championship Division B: All-Tournament Team & MVP
- 2019 FIBA Europe Under-18 Championship: All-Tournament Team
