= 2026 Greek basketball match-fixing scandal =

Sports scandal in Greece

- Arrests: Evangelos Liolios, Vaso Tsaroucha, Petros Papapetrou, Tasos Piloidis, Ilias Koromilas, Giorgos Mavragiannis
- Accused: Match fixing

The 2026 Greek Basketball match-fixing scandal is a major sports scandal in Greek basketball, involving the Hellenic Basketball Federation's president, Evangelos Liolios, as well as various notable referees.

== History ==
On 21 October 2026, Evangelos Liolios, the president of the Hellenic Basketball Federation, Evangelos Liolios, as well as five other people, including referees, were arrested, after the Greek police issued arrest warrants, with the charge of fixing matches. It was later revealed that Greek basketball legend Panagiotis Giannakis would also take legal action against Liolios and the other people accused of match-fixing, as a 2018 match involving Aris when Giannakis was its coach had also been fixed.

== Reactions ==
=== Political parties and politicians ===
Giannis Vroutsis, the alternate minister of sports, temporarily suspended all funding of the Hellenic Basketball Federation.

The Communist Party of Greece blamed "business antagonisms that manipulate and destroy the sport", also stating that the stance of the New Democracy government and others who speak of "catharsis" of the sport is hypocritical because at the same time they "support business action in sports."

== See also ==
- Koriopolis
