= Michalis Mouroutsos Indoor Hall =

Michalis Mouroutsos Indoor Hall, or Dafni Indoor Hall, is an indoor arena that is located in the district of Dafni, Athens, which is about 3 km from the downtown center of the city of Athens, Greece. The arena is mainly used to host basketball games. The hall is owned by the municipality of Dafni, Athens. It has a seating capacity of 1,200 people.

== History ==
The arena was built in 1992. It is named after Michalis Mouroutsos, a Tae-Kwon-Do athlete from Dafni, who won the gold medal in the 2000 Olympic Tae-Kwon-Do Tournament at the Sydney 2000 Summer Olympics. It is the home arena of the Dafni Greek professional basketball team.
