= George Vassilakopoulos =

Greek basketball player and coach (born 1939)

George Vassilakopoulos Γιώργος Βασιλακόπουλος

1st President of FIBA Europe
- In office 2002–2010
- Succeeded by: Ólafur Rafnsson

Personal details
- Born: 1939 (age 86–87) Piraeus, Greece
- Basketball career

Career information
- Playing career: 1957–1967
- Position: Small forward

Career history
- 1957–1958: Peiraikos
- 1958–1967: Panathinaikos

Career highlights
- As player: 3× Greek League champion (1961, 1962, 1967); As executive: FIBA Order of Merit (2010)

George Vassilakopoulos (alternate spellings: Georgios, Giorgos, Vasilakopoulos, Vassilacopoulos, Vasilacopoulos; Greek: Γιώργος Βασιλακόπουλος; born 1939) is a Greek politician, former professional basketball player, former professional basketball coach, the former President of FIBA Europe, the European division of the international governing body of the sport of basketball, FIBA, and the former President of the Hellenic Basketball Federation.

== Basketball playing career ==
Vassilakopoulos played professional basketball in the Greek League with Peiraikos and Panathinaikos. With Panathinaikos, he won 3 Greek League championships, in the years 1961, 1962, and 1967. He was also the captain of Panathinaikos.

== Basketball coaching and managing career ==
After his basketball playing career ended, Vassilakopoulos went into coaching. He worked as a coach with Panathinaikos, Ethnikos Piraeus, Ionikos Nikaias, Ionikos NF, and Panionios. He also worked as a basketball referee.

He became the President of the Hellenic Basketball Federation, for the first time, in February 1998, and he remained in that position until November 2002. Vassilakopoulos became the first President of FIBA Europe, in 2002. On 13 September 2010, he once again became the Hellenic Federation's President.

In 2010, he was awarded the FIBA Order of Merit. He then became the Honorary President of FIBA Europe, in 2011. In May 2012, he received a lifetime achievement award from FIBA Europe.

== Political career ==
Vassilakopoulos was for many years a member of the Central Committee of the Panhellenic Socialist Movement (PASOK). He also served as Greece's national General Secretary of Sports, under the government of Andreas Papandreou, from 1993 to 1996.

== Personal life ==
Vassilakopoulos' family is from Lampeia.
