= John Sinis =

Greek basketball player

John Sinis Γιάννης Σίνης
Free agent
- Position: Power forward / center

Personal information
- Born: September 4, 1991 (age 35) Patras, Greece
- Listed height: 6 ft 9 in (2.06 m)
- Listed weight: 236 lb (107 kg)

Career information
- College: San Diego (2011–2013)
- NBA draft: 2014: undrafted
- Playing career: 2013–present

Career history
- 2013–2015: Rethymno Cretan Kings
- 2015–2016: Kavala
- 2016–2017: Psychiko
- 2017–2018: Arkadikos

John Sinis, or Giannis Sinis (Greek: Γιάννης Σίνης; born September 4, 1991), is a Greek professional basketball player. He is 2.06 m (6 ft 9 in) tall. He plays at the power forward and center positions.

== College career ==
Sinis played college basketball at the University of San Diego with the Toreros.

== Professional career ==
Sinis began his professional career with the top-tier level Greek Basket League club Rethymno Cretan Kings in 2013. In 2015, he moved to Kavala. He missed the season, due to injury.

In 2016, he signed with the Psychiko of the 2nd-tier level Greek A2 Basket League.
