= Nikos Kaklamanos =

Greek basketball player

No. 10 – Karditsas
- Position: Point guard / shooting guard
- League: Greek A2 Division

Personal information
- Born: 12 July 1981 (age 45) Athens, Greece
- Listed height: 6 ft 2.5 in (1.89 m)
- Listed weight: 215 lb (98 kg)

Career information
- Playing career: 2004–present

Career history
- 2004–2006: Olympia Larissa
- 2006–2009: Trikala 2000
- 2009–2010: Pagrati
- 2010–2011: Panelefsiniakos
- 2012–2013: Trikala Aries
- 2013–2014: Koroivos
- 2016–2017: Aiolos Astakou
- 2017–2018: Kastoria
- 2018–present: Karditsas

Nikos Kaklamanos (Greek: Νίκος Κακλαμάνος, born 12 July 1981 in Greece) is a Greek professional basketball player. He is 1.89 m (6 ft 2 1/2 in) in height. He can play at both the point guard and shooting guard positions.

== Professional career ==
In his pro career, Kaklamanos has played with clubs such as: Olympia Larissa, Trikala 2000, Pagrati, Panelefsiniakos, Trikala Aries, Koroivos, Aiolos Astakou, Kastorias, and Karditsas. He was named the Greek 2nd Division Player of the Year, by the website Eurobasket.com, in 2008.
