= Dimitris Siologkas =

Greek basketball player

Dimitris Siologas Δημήτρης Σιολόγκας
Ethnikos Piraeus
- Position: Small forward
- League: Greek A2 Basket League

Personal information
- Born: April 28, 1994 (age 32) Thessaloniki, Greece
- Listed height: 6 ft 6 in (1.98 m)

Career information
- Playing career: 2013–present

Career history
- 2013–2014: Iraklis Thessaloniki
- 2014–2015: Kolossos Rodou
- 2015: Aries Trikala
- 2016: AS Evropi Pefkohori
- 2016–2017: Filippos Verias
- 2017–present: Ethnikos Piraeus

Dimitris Siologas (alternate spellings: Dimitrios, Siologkas) (Greek: Δημήτρης Σιολόγκας); (born April 28, 1994) is a Greek professional basketball player. At 1.98 m tall, he plays the forward positions.

== Professional career ==
Siologas started his professional career with Iraklis Thessaloniki on a season loan from Mantoulidis. In 2016 he signed with Aries Trikala but was released on November 10 of the same year.
