= Andreas Miaoulis (basketball) =

Andreas Miaoulis (1938 – 31 August 2010) was a commissioner of the Hellenic Basketball Federation.

He was elected as president of Hellenic Basketball Federation in 2002. In 2010, he died from cancer in Athens, Greece. As a tribute, a minute's silence was held before Greece's game against Ivory Coast during the 2010 FIBA World Championship.
