= Vangelis Angelou =

Greek professional basketball coach

Vangelis Angelou Βαγγέλης Αγγέλου
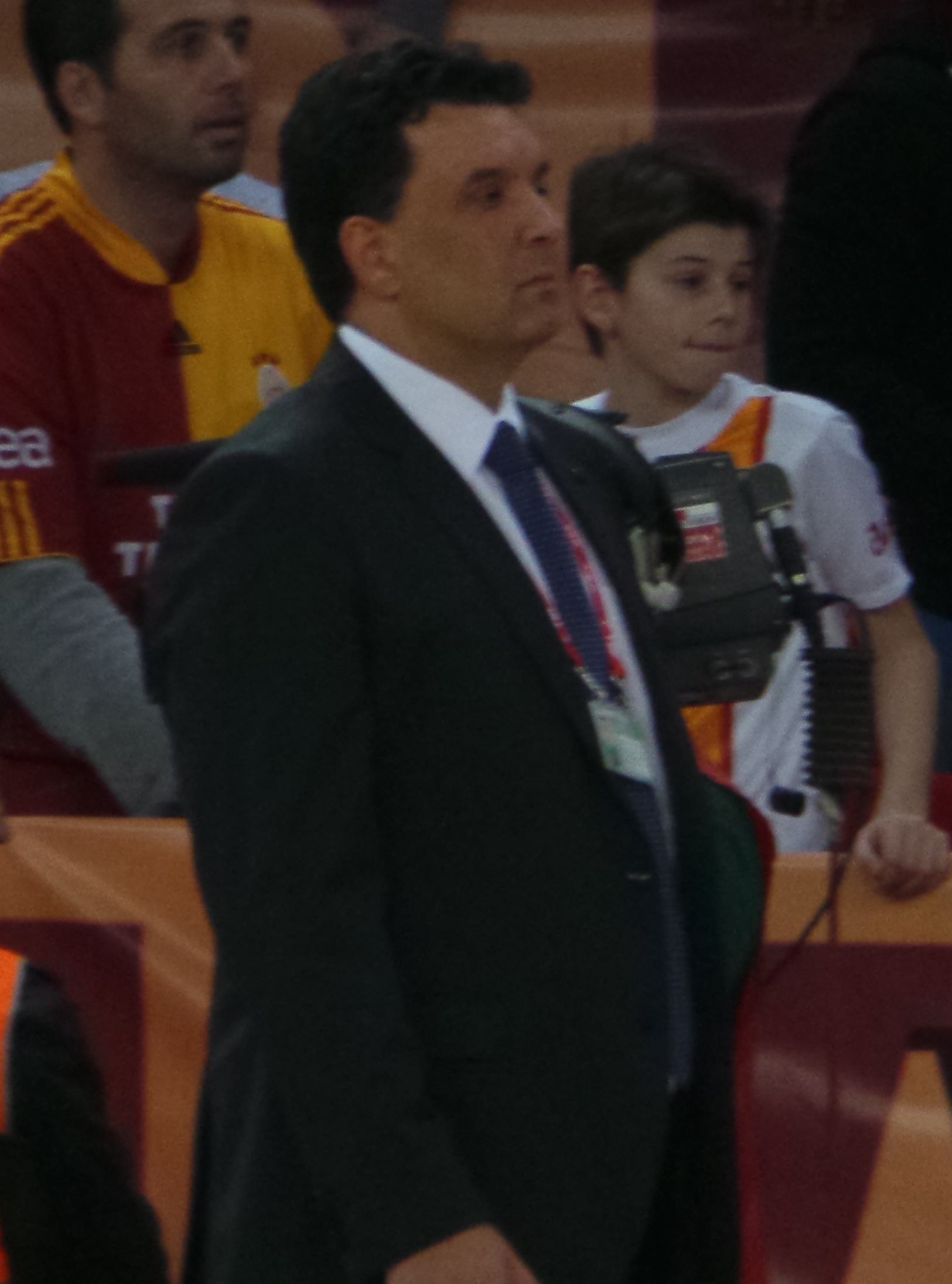
- Angelou, coaching Efes, in 2014.

Personal information
- Born: November 11, 1962 (age 64) Chalkida, Greece
- Listed height: 6 ft 2.75 in (1.90 m)

Career information
- Playing career: 1984–1996
- Position: Point guard
- Coaching career: 1996–present

Career history

Playing
- 1984–1988: Apollon Patras
- 1988–1992: Olympiacos
- 1992–1995: Panionios
- 1995–1996: Iraklis

Coaching
- 1996–2002: AGE Chalkida
- 2002–2003: Aris (assistant)
- 2003–2005: Maroussi (assistant)
- 2005–2007: Dynamo Moscow (assistant)
- 2007–2008: AEK Athens
- 2008–2009: Trikala 2000
- 2010–2012: Olympiacos (assistant)
- 2012–2013: Aris
- 2013–2014: Efes
- 2014–2016: Efes (assistant)
- 2016–2017: Promitheas Patras
- 2018: Aris Thessaloniki
- 2019–2020: Larisa
- 2020–2021: Ionikos Nikaias
- 2021: AEK Athens
- 2021–2022: Zamalek
- 2022–2023: Karditsa

Career highlights
- As an assistant coach: EuroLeague champion (2012); EuroCup champion (2006); Greek League champion (2012); Greek Cup winner (2011)

Evangelos "Vangelis" Angelou (alternate spelling: Vaggelis Aggelou) (Greek: Ευάγγελος "Βαγγέλης" Αγγέλου; born November 11, 1962, in Chalkida, Greece), is a Greek retired professional basketball player and current professional basketball coach. At 6 ft 2 in (1.88 m) in height, Angelou played at the point guard position.

== Professional career ==
Angelou began playing basketball with the youth teams of AGE Chalkida. In his pro playing career, Angelou played with Apollon Patras, Olympiacos, Panionios, and Iraklis. He scored 1,782 points in 254 games played in the Greek League. He also played in the FIBA Korać Cup with Olympiacos and Panionios, and in the FIBA EuroLeague with Iraklis.

== Coaching career ==
Angelou began his coaching career with AGE Chalkida from 1996 to 2002, where he led the club from the lower categories of Greek basketball up to the Greek 2nd Division. He then worked as an assistant coach under Milan Minić at Aris in the 2002–03 season. He then moved to Maroussi, where he was an assistant coach under Panagiotis Giannakis, from 2003 to 2005. After that, he moved to Dynamo Moscow, where he was Dušan Ivković's assistant from 2005 to 2007.

He was named the head coach of AEK Athens on November 7, 2007, and remained the team's head coach for the 2007–08 season. He was then the head coach of Trikala 2000 in the 2008–09 season. After coaching Trikala, he once again worked as Ivković's assistant, this time at Olympiacos, from 2010 to 2012. He then became the head coach of Aris in 2012.

He then became the head coach of Efes in December 2013, and then worked as an assistant with Efes. He became the head coach of the Greek club Promitheas Patras in December 2016. He became Aris' head coach again, in 2018.

== Personal life ==
Angelou's son, Georgios, is a professional basketball player, and played under Angelou, while he was the head coach of Aris.His brother Argyris is a famous Greek actor.

== Awards and accomplishments ==
=== Assistant coach ===
- EuroCup Champion: (2006)
- Greek Cup Winner: (2011)
- EuroLeague Champion: (2012)
- Greek League Champion: (2012)
