= Aiolos Astakou B.C. =

Aiolos Astakos A.M.S.
- Founded: 1990
- History: 1990 – Present
- Arena: Astakos Municipal Sports Center
- Location: Astakos, Aetolia-Acarnania, Greece
- Team colors: Yellow and Blue
- President: Apostolis Pantazis
- Head coach: Michalis Koutalianos
- Championships: 1 Greek B Championship (2016)
- Website: aiolosastakoubc.gr
Home	Away

Aiolos Astakou B.C. (alternate spellings: Aeolus and Astakos; Greek: Αίολος Αστακού / Αίολος Αστακός) is a Greek professional basketball club. The club is located in Astakos, Aetolia-Acarnania, Greece. The club's full name is A.M.S. Aiolos Astakou (Α.Μ.Σ. Αίολος Αστακού). The club is named after the Greek god Aeolus. The club's name can be translated into English as Aeolus Lobster.

The team competes in the Greek A2 Basket League.

== History ==
Aiolos Astakou was founded in 1990. The club reached the lower minor league divisions of Greek basketball for the first in the 2003–04 season. The club reached the 4th-tier level Greek C Basket League, for the first time, in the 2014–15 season.

They then played in the 3rd-tier level Greek B Basket League in the 2015–16 season. They were then promoted to the 2nd-tier level Greek A2 Basket League for the 2016–17 season.

== Arenas ==
Aiolos Astakou's permanent home arena is the Astakos Municipal Sports Center, which is located in Xiromero, Astakos. They have also temporarily played at the Vonitsa Indoor Hall, which is located in Vonitsa, while a construction project on their regular home arena was being done.

== Titles ==
- Greek 3rd Division Champion: (2016)

== Roster ==
Note: Flags indicate national team eligibility at FIBA-sanctioned events. Players may hold other non-FIBA nationalities not displayed.

Aiolos Astakos B.C. roster
Players
Coaches

Pos.	No.	Nat.	Name	Ht.	Wt.	Age
PF	4	(Greece)	Brozos, George	2.00 m (6 ft 7 in)		40 – 25 May 1986
SF	5	(Greece)	Theodorakos, Giorgos	1.98 m (6 ft 6 in)		38 – 17 January 1988
PG	6	(Greece)	Koumpouras, Fanis	1.87 m (6 ft 2 in)	95 kg (209 lb)	42 – 8 December 1983
G/F	7	(Greece)	Papadionysiou, Stathis	1.96 m (6 ft 5 in)		34 – 15 June 1992
PG	8	(Greece)	Katsares, Nikos	1.87 m (6 ft 2 in)		43 – 17 March 1983
G	9	(Greece)	Gatzias, Aggelos	1.94 m (6 ft 4 in)
SG	10	(Greece)	Kaklamanos, Nikos	1.87 m (6 ft 2 in)		45 – 12 July 1981
F	11	(Greece)	Kitsoulis, Vasillis	2.02 m (6 ft 8 in)		43 – 3 May 1983
C	12	(Greece)	Kasabalis, Tasos	2.08 m (6 ft 10 in)
C	13	(Greece)	Charismidis, Tasos	2.03 m (6 ft 8 in)		45 – 7 June 1981
C	14	(Greece)	Psomas-Libaris, Nikos	2.08 m (6 ft 10 in)		42 – 16 January 1984
PF	17	(Greece)	Gizogiannis, Andronikos	2.03 m (6 ft 8 in)	110 kg (243 lb)	43 – 8 February 1983

Head coach

- (Greece) Michalis Koutalianos

Legend

- (C) Team captain
- Injured

== Notable players ==
Note: Flags indicate national team eligibility at FIBA-sanctioned events. Players may hold other non-FIBA nationalities not displayed.

Criteria

To appear in this section a player must have either:

- Set a club record or won an individual award while at the club
- Played at least one official international match for their national team at any time
- Played at least one official NBA match at any time.

- (Greece) Andronikos Gizogiannis
- (Greece) Nikos Kaklamanos
- (Greece) Fanis Koumpouras
- (Greece) Stathis Papadionysiou
