= Devonte Green =

American basketball player (born 1997)

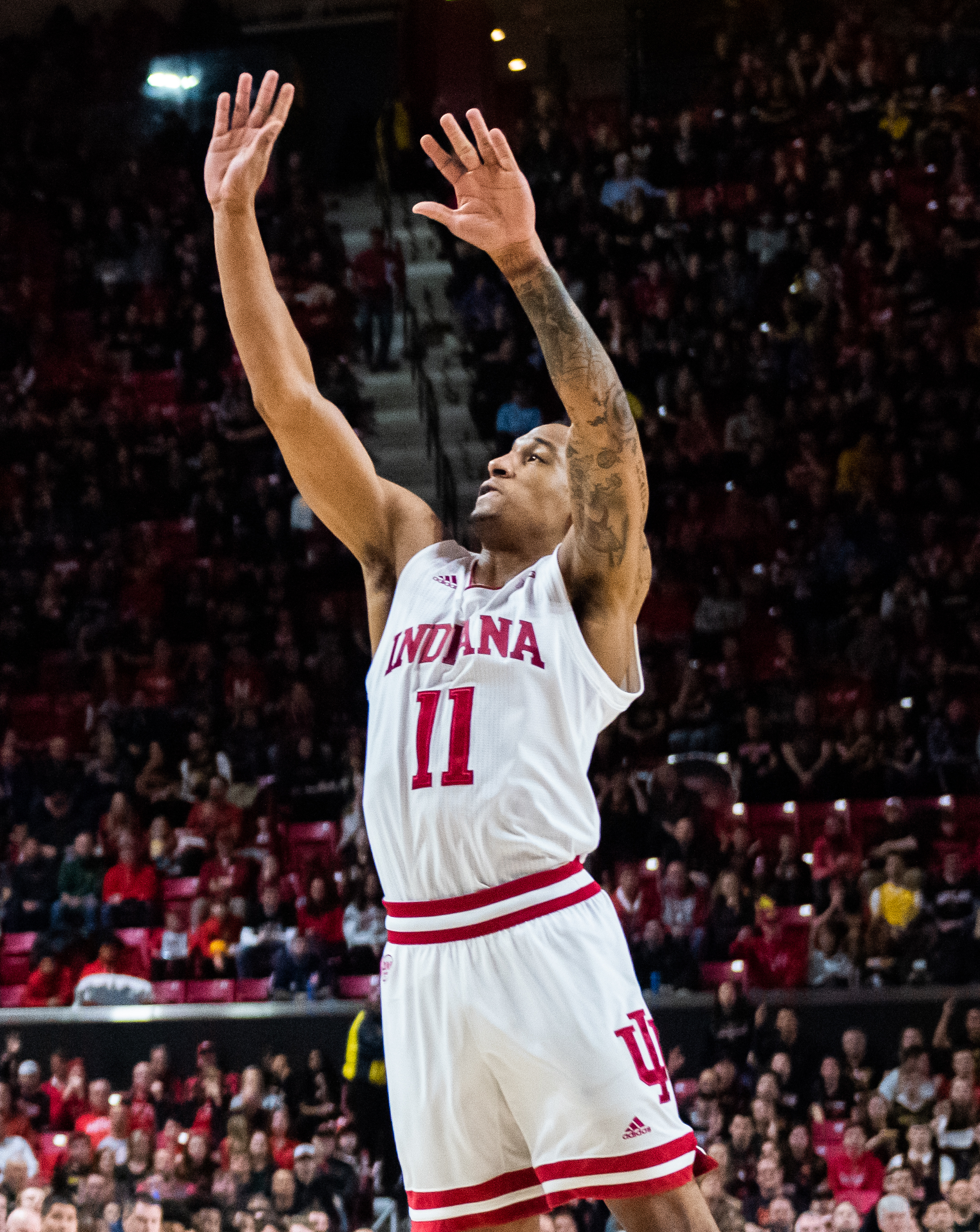
- Green in action with Indiana

No. 11 – Neftçi
- Position: Shooting guard
- League: Azerbaijan Basketball League; Europe Cup

Personal information
- Born: February 2, 1997 (age 29) West Babylon, New York, U.S.
- Listed height: 6 ft 3 in (1.91 m)
- Listed weight: 185 lb (84 kg)

Career information
- High school: Long Island Lutheran (Brookville, New York)
- College: Indiana (2016–2020)
- Playing career: 2020–present

Career history
- 2020–2021: Charilaos Trikoupis
- 2021–2022: Larisa
- 2022: Atomerőmű SE
- 2022: Al Ahli Tripoli
- 2022–2025: Norrköping Dolphins
- 2025: Suke Lions
- 2025–present: Neftçi

Career highlights
- Swedish League Finals MVP (2023); Swedish League champion (2023)

Devonte Green (born February 2, 1997) is an American professional basketball player for Neftçi of the Azerbaijan Basketball League. He played college basketball for the Indiana Hoosiers.

== Early life ==
Green attended Long Island Lutheran Middle and High School at Brookville, New York.

== College career ==
Green played for Indiana Hoosiers from 2016 to 2020. As a junior, he averaged 9.4 points and 3.4 rebounds per game, shooting 41 percent from behind the arc. Following the season, he declared for the 2019 NBA draft, before eventually withdrawing. On December 3, 2019, Green scored a career-high 30 points in an 80–64 win against Florida State. During his senior season, he averaged 10.8 points, 2.7 rebounds, and 2.1 assists per game.

== Professional career ==
=== Charilaos Trikoupis Mesologiou (2020-2021) ===
Green entered the 2020 NBA draft and went undrafted.

Green started his professional career in Greece, where he signed with Charilaos Trikoupis of the Greek Basket League (GBL) on August 15, 2020.

On March 2, 2021, Green mutually parted ways with Trikoupis, due to a serious medical condition that he suffered during the season. In nine GBL games, he averaged 15.3 points, 3.3 rebounds, 2.1 assists, and 0.6 steals with the Greek club.

On August 9, 2021, Green was added to the Philadelphia 76ers organization for 2021 NBA Summer League.

=== Larissa BC (2021–2022) ===
On November 12, 2021, Green returned to the Greek Basket League, this time signing for Larisa, replacing Josh Fortune. In 21 league games, he averaged 7.9 points, 2 rebounds and 1.1 assists, playing around 19 minutes per contest.

=== Atomeromu SE Paks (2022–2023) ===
In August 2022, Green signed with Atomerőmű SE.

On May 10, 2024, Green joined Assembly Ball for The Basketball Tournament.

=== Norrkoping Dolphins (2022–2023 & 2024–2025) ===
On May 17, 203, Green was awarded the Eurobasket.com All-Swedish Basketligan Finals MVP, Second Team, and All-Imports Team.

On June 30, 2024, Green re-signed with Norrköping Dolphins. On February 13, 2025, Green received a Hoops Agents Player of the Week award for Round 22. He had the game-high 23 points, 4 rebounds and 5 assists for his team's victory.

=== Neftçi (2025–present) ===
On September 7, 2025, he signed with Neftçi of the Azerbaijan Basketball League.

== Career statistics ==
Legend
GP	Games played	GS	Games started	MPG	Minutes per game
FG%	Field goal percentage	3P%	3-point field goal percentage	FT%	Free throw percentage
RPG	Rebounds per game	APG	Assists per game	SPG	Steals per game
BPG	Blocks per game	PPG	Points per game	**Bold**	Career high

=== College ===
Year	Team	GP	GS	MPG	FG%	3P%	FT%	RPG	APG	SPG	BPG	PPG
2016–17	Indiana	**32**	3	15.2	**.443**	**.436**	.706	1.8	1.1	.7	.2	4.4
2017–18	Indiana	31	**12**	22.5	.364	.337	.705	1.9	2.5	1.0	.2	7.6
2018–19	Indiana	28	9	**25.1**	.402	.410	**.736**	**3.4**	**3.0**	**1.4**	**.5**	9.4
2019–20	Indiana	29	7	22.1	.365	.358	.706	2.7	2.1	.7	.2	**10.8**
Career		120	31	21.1	.385	.377	.713	2.4	2.1	.9	.3	8.0

== Personal life ==
Green's brother, Rashad, played for Manhattan College in 2007–08 and the University of San Francisco from 2009 to 2012. His older brother, Danny, won three NBA championships. His second cousins are NBA player Gerald Green and Garlon Green. A first cousin, Jordan Green, played for Texas A&M University. and a third cousin, Willie Green, in the NBA and for Detroit Mercy.
