= Nikos Papanikolaou (basketball) =

Greek basketball player

Nikos Papanikolaou Νίκος Παπανικολάου
No. 7 – Psychiko
- Position: Power forward / center
- League: Greek A2 Basket League

Personal information
- Born: June 1, 1985 (age 41) Rhodes, Greece
- Listed height: 6 ft 10.25 in (2.09 m)
- Listed weight: 240 lb (109 kg)

Career information
- NBA draft: 2007: undrafted
- Playing career: 2004–present

Career history
- 2004–2007: AEK Athens
- 2007–2010: Ilysiakos
- 2010–2011: AEK Athens
- 2011–2012: Rethymno Aegean
- 2012–2013: Panelefsiniakos
- 2013–2017: Psychiko
- 2017–2018: Holargos
- 2018–present: Psychiko
Medals
Men's basketball
Representing Greece
Mediterranean Games
Silver medal – second place	2009 Pescara	Under-26

Nikolaos Papanikolaou (Greek: Νικόλαος "Νίκος" Παπανικολάου; born June 1, 1985) is a Greek professional basketball player for Psychiko of the Greek A2 Basket League. He is a 6 ft 10 1/4 in (2.09 m) tall power forward-center.

== Professional career ==
Some of the clubs that Papanikolaou has played with during his pro career include: AEK Athens, Ilysiakos, Rethymno Aegean, Panelefsiniakos, and Psychiko.

== National team career ==
Papanikolaou was a member of the junior national teams of Greece. With Greece's junior national teams, he played at the 2001 FIBA Europe Under-16 Championship and the 2004 FIBA Europe Under-20 Championship. Papanikolaou won the silver medal at the 2009 Mediterranean Games, with the Greek under-26 national team.
