= Sokratis Naoumis =

Greek basketball player

Personal information
- Born: August 4, 1997 (age 29) Agrinio, Greece
- Listed height: 6 ft 3 in (1.91 m)
- Listed weight: 180 lb (82 kg)

Career information
- Playing career: 2016–present
- Position: Point guard

Career history
- 2016–2017: Apollon Patras
- 2016–2017: → Arkadikos
- 2017–2018: AEL 1964
- 2018–2019: Kavala
- 2019–2021: Charilaos Trikoupis
- 2021–2022: Koroivos Amaliadas
- 2022–2023: Eleftheroupoli Kavalas
- 2023–2024: Doxa Lefkadas

Career highlights
- Greek 2nd Division champion (2020)

Sokratis Naoumis (Greek: Σωκράτης Ναούμης; born August 4, 1997) is a Greek professional basketball player. Standing at 1.91 m (6 ft 3 in) tall, he plays at the point guard position.

== Youth career ==
Naoumis played from a young age with the youth teams of A.O. Agriniou, before he started his pro career.

== Professional career ==
Naoumis started his professional career with the Greek 1st Division club Apollon Patras, in 2016. He was loaned to Arkadikos of the Greek A2 League (2nd Division), the same year, in order to gain more playing time. On July 1, 2018, he joined the Greek club Kavala.
