= Fanis Koumpouras =

Greek professional basketball player

AEK Athens
- Title: Team manager
- League: GBL

Personal information
- Born: December 8, 1983 (age 42) Athens, Greece
- Listed height: 6 ft 1.75 in (1.87 m)
- Listed weight: 210 lb (95 kg)

Career information
- Playing career: 2001–2023
- Position: Point guard

Career history
- 2001–2004: Chalkida
- 2004–2007: Apollon Patras
- 2007–2008: Olympia Larissa
- 2008–2010: Maroussi
- 2010–2011: Aris Thessaloniki
- 2011–2012: Ikaros Kallitheas
- 2012–2013: Kolossos Rodou
- 2013–2015: Rethymno
- 2015–2016: Promitheas Patras
- 2016–2017: Aiolos Astakos
- 2017–2018: Ippokratis Kos
- 2018–2021: Oiakas Nafpliou
- 2021–2022: Aigaleo
- 2022–2023: Pagrati
Medals
Men's basketball
Representing Greece
FIBA Europe Under-16 Championship
Silver medal – second place	1999 Slovenia	Under-16
FIBA Europe Under-18 Championship
Bronze medal – third place	2000 Croatia	Under-18
FIBA Europe Under-20 Championship
Gold medal – first place	2002 Lithuania	Under-20
Mediterranean Games
Silver medal – second place	2005 Almería	Under-26
Silver medal – second place	2009 Pescara	Under-26

Theophanis "Fanis" Koumpouras (Greek: Θεοφάνης "Φάνης" Κουμπούρας; born December 8, 1983) is a Greek former professional basketball player. He is 6 ft 1 3/4 in (1.87 m) in height, and played at the point guard position.

== Professional career ==
Koumpouras began his career playing with the Panionios youth teams. He began his pro career in 2001, with Chalkida. In 2004, he moved to Apollon Patras. In 2007, he joined Olympia Larissa, where he had a great year during the 2007–08 season. In 2008, he signed with Maroussi.

== National team career ==
With the Greek junior national teams, Koumpouras played at the 1999 FIBA Europe Under-16 Championship, where he won a silver medal, at the 2000 FIBA Europe Under-18 Championship, where he won a bronze medal, and at the 2002 FIBA Europe Under-20 Championship, where he won a gold medal.

With the Greek under-26 national team, he won the silver medal at both the 2005 Mediterranean Games and the 2009 Mediterranean Games.
