= Sakis Tataris =

Greek basketball player

Koroivos
- Position: Power forward / center
- League: Greek A2 Basket League

Personal information
- Born: February 5, 1998 (age 28) Patras, Greece
- Listed height: 6 ft 8.75 in (2.05 m)
- Listed weight: 250 lb (113 kg)

Career history
- 2015–2016: Apollon Patras
- 2016–2018: Aris
- 2016–2017: → Machites Doxas Pefkon
- 2017–2018: → Aries Trikala
- 2018–2019: Peristeri
- 2018–2019: → Dafni Dafniou
- 2019–present: Koroivos Amaliadas
Medals
Representing Greece
Men's basketball
FIBA Europe Under-20 Championship
Gold medal – first place	2017 Greece	National Team

Dionysios "Sakis" Tataris (alternate spelling: Dionysis) (Greek: Διονύσιος "Σάκης" Τάταρης; born February 5, 1998) is a Greek professional basketball player for Koroivos Amaliadas of the Greek A2 Basket League. He is a 2.05 m (6 ft 8 3/4 in) tall and 113 kg (249 lb) power forward-center.

== Professional career ==
Tataris began his professional career in 2015, with the Greek Basket League club Apollon Patras. He signed with the Greek First Division club Aris, in 2016, and was then loaned by them to the Greek 2nd Division club Machites Doxas Pefkon.

On September 16, 2017, he was loaned to Aries Trikala of the Greek Basket League.

== Greek national team ==
Tataris has been a member of the Greek junior national teams. With Greece's junior national teams, he played at the 2014 FIBA Europe Under-16 Championship, the 2016 FIBA Europe Under-18 Championship, and the 2017 FIBA Europe Under-20 Championship. He also played at the 2017 FIBA Europe Under-20 Championship, where he won a gold medal.
