= Richard Amardi =

Canadian basketball player (born 1989)

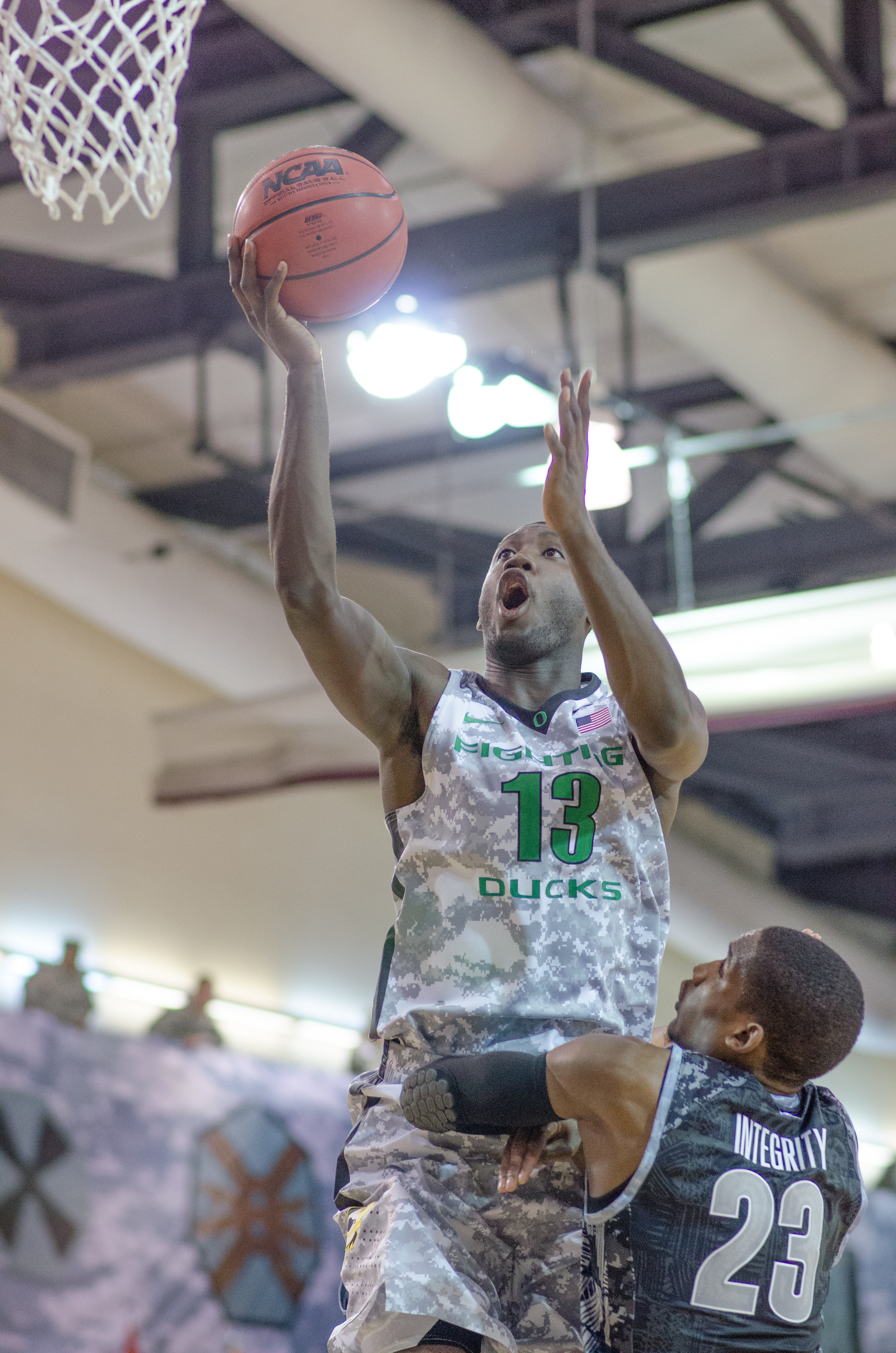
- Amardi with Oregon in the 2013 Armed Forces Classic

Personal information
- Born: October 16, 1989 (age 37) Toronto, Ontario, Canada
- Listed height: 6 ft 9 in (2.06 m)
- Listed weight: 224 lb (102 kg)

Career information
- High school: Winston Churchill Collegiate Institute (Scarborough, Ontario)
- College: Weatherford (2010–2011); Indian Hills (2011–2013); Oregon (2013–2014)
- NBA draft: 2014: undrafted
- Playing career: 2014–2023
- Position: Power forward

Career history
- 2014–2016: Orangeville A's
- 2016–2017: Niagara River Lions
- 2017: Raptors 905
- 2018: Spisska Nova Ves
- 2018–2019: Windsor Express
- 2019: Moncton Magic
- 2019: Al Ahli
- 2019–2020: Levski Sofia
- 2020: Yambol
- 2020–2021: Charilaos Trikoupis
- 2021–2022: Dorados de Chihuahua
- 2022–2023: Pinheiros

Career highlights
- All-NBL Canada Third Team (2017)

Richard Amardi (born October 16, 1989) is a Canadian former professional basketball player. He played college basketball at Weatherford College, Indian Hills Community College, and the University of Oregon. Amardi has also been a member of the senior Canadian national team.

== Early life and education ==
Amardi, who is of Ghanaian descent, was born in Toronto, Ontario, and he was raised in Scarborough, Ontario. He attended Winston Churchill Collegiate Institute (WCCI) in Scarborough, where he played high school basketball.

== College career ==
=== Weatherford ===
In the 2010–11 season, Amardi played his first year of college basketball, at Weatherford College, in Weatherford, Texas. He played in 12 games with the Weatherford Coyotes. He averaged 13.4 points, 9.7 rebounds, 1.9 assists, 1.0 steals, and 1.1 blocks per game. Amardi left Weatherford, due to family reasons.

=== Indian Hills ===
In the 2012–13 season, Amardi played for the Indian Hills Community College's Warriors in Iowa. He was the team's starter at the power forward position. He averaged 8.6 points and 5.2 rebounds per game.

=== Oregon ===
In his senior year, Amardi moved from Iowa, to the surroundings of Eugene, Oregon, where he played NCAA Division I college basketball at the University of Oregon, with the Ducks. He was the team's starting power forward. While playing under the team's head coach Dana Altman, Amardi appeared in all 34 of his team's games. He averaged 6.4 points per game, and ranked second best on the team in rebounding, with an average of 3.9 per game. Amardi was also ranked third on the team in blocked shots, and fifth on the team in steals.

In his first start of the year, Amardi scored a career-best 16 points, on 7-of-8 shooting from the field, and grabbed 8 rebounds versus Morgan State. One of the best games that he played while he was a member of the Ducks, was an away game against Washington, in which he scored 11 points, racked up a season-high 9 rebounds, and blocked 3 shots.

== Professional career ==
In the 2014–15 season, Amardi started his professional career close to where he grew up, with the National Basketball League of Canada's Brampton A's. He played with the A's for two years. He averaged 15.2 points, 4.6 rebounds and 1.1 assists per game in his rookie season. In the 2015–16 season, he averaged 11.9 points, 4.4 rebounds and 1.5 assists per game.

Amardi then played with the Niagara River Lions, in the 2016–17 season. He averaged 12.8 points and 6.3 rebounds per game with the River Lions. Amardi was named to the NBLC All-Canadian Third Team. For the 2017 season, Amardi joined Raptors 905, but he was waived on December 11, 2017.

On January 30, 2019, he signed with Al Ahli in Libya. On August 7, 2020, Amardi signed with the Greek Basket League club Charilaos Trikoupis. On January 29, 2021, Amardi mutually parted ways with the Greek team. In 12 games with them, he averaged 7.2 points and 4.4 rebounds.

Amardi signed with Mexican club Dorados de Chihuahua in the East Division of the Liga Nacional de Baloncesto Profesional (LNBP) for the 2021–2022 season.In 8 games with the club, he averaged 5.9 points, 3 rebounds, and 1 assists per game. He left the team at the end of his contract at seasons endings.

In November 2022, Amardi continued his professional basketball career by signing with the Brazilian team of Esporte Clube Pinheiros, of Brazils top professional league, Novo Basquete Brasil (NBB). In 19 games with the club, the Canadian forward averaged 8.6 points, 5.6 rebounds while helping lead Pinheiros to a 13–6 record.

== National team career ==
On August 22, 2017, Amardi was named to the senior Canadian National Team's roster for the 2017 FIBA AmeriCup, which was held in Argentina. He averaged 3.5 points and 1.5 rebounds per game at the tournament.

== Personal life ==
Amardi is the son of Maxwell (aka Max-B) and Elizabeth Amardi. He has four siblings, Edward, Constance, Olivia and Crystal.
