= AGEH Gymnastikos B.C. =

AGEH Gymnastikos
- Leagues: Greek Elite League
- Founded: 1976
- History: 1976 – 2010; AGE Chalkida B.C. 2010 – Present; AGEH Gymnastikos B.C.
- Arena: Tasos Kampouris Kanithou Indoor Hall (capacity: 1,620)
- Location: Chalkida, Greece
- Team colors: White, Blue, and Orange
- Website: eurobasket.com/team
Home	Away

AGEH Gymnastikos B.C. is a Greek professional basketball club that is located in Chalkida, Greece.

== History ==
AGEH Gymnastikos was founded in 1976, as AGE Chalkida. In 2010, it merged with Gymnastikos Syllogos Chalkida, to form AGEH Gymnastikos. The club competed in the Greek 2nd Division, during the period 2001–2008. In the 2008–09 and 2009-10 seasons, the club was relegated in two straight seasons, and ended up in the Greek local regional divisions.

In 2013, the club was dissolved because of financial problems. The club returned in 2017.

On September 25, 2025, the club was merged with Ermis Schimatari and will participate to the Greek Elite League.

== Arena ==
AGEH plays its home games at the Tasos Kampouris Kanithou Indoor Hall, which is also located on the island of Euboea, in Chalcis, and has a seating capacity of 1,620 people.

== Notable players ==
Note: Flags indicate national team eligibility at FIBA-sanctioned events. Players may hold other non-FIBA nationalities not displayed.

Criteria

To appear in this section a player must have either:

- Set a club record or won an individual award while at the club
- Played at least one official international match for their national team at any time
- Played at least one official NBA match at any time.

- Fotis Vasilopoulos
- Makis Dreliozis
- Fanis Koumpouras
- Alexis Falekas
- Andronikos Gizogiannis
- Ioannis Psathas

== Head coaches ==
- Vangelis Angelou
- Kostas Missas
