= Petros Velissariou =

Greek basketball player

Petros Velissariou Πέτρος Βελισσαρίου
No. 6 – Machites Doxas Pefkon
- Position: Point guard
- League: Greek A2 Basket League

Personal information
- Born: April 20, 1993 (age 33) Thessaloniki, Greece
- Listed height: 6 ft 2.75 in (1.90 m)
- Listed weight: 200 lb (91 kg)

Career information
- Playing career: 2012–present

Career history
- 2012–2016: Kavala
- 2016–present: Machites Doxas Pefkon

Career highlights
- Greek 2nd Division champion (2015)

Petros Velissariou (Greek: Πέτρος Βελισσαρίου; born April 20, 1993) is a Greek professional basketball player. He is 1.90 m (6 ft 2 ¾ in) tall.

== Club career ==
After playing youth basketball at Mantoulidis, Velissariou started his playing career in 2012, playing with Kavala.
