= Ilias Papatheodorou =

Greek professional basketball coach (born 1975)

Maroussi
- Position: Head coach
- League: Greek Basketball League

Personal information
- Born: 20 June 1975 (age 51) Korydallos, Greece
- Coaching career: 1995–present

Career history

Coaching
- 1995–2001: Athinaikos (Cadets, Juniors)
- 2001–2002: Athinaikos (Assistant)
- 2002–2004: Larissaikos
- 2004–2007: Markopoulo
- 2007–2016: Nea Kifissia
- 2013–2018: Greece Under-18
- 2014–2018: Greece Under-19 / Under-20
- 2016–2017: Astana
- 2017–2019: PAOK Thessaloniki
- 2019–2021: AEK Athens
- 2021: Greece (Assistant)
- 2021–present: Switzerland
- 2022–2023: Kolossos Rodou
- 2023–2025: Promitheas Patras
- 2025–present: Maroussi

Career highlights
- As a head coach: Greek Cup winner (2020); Kazakhstan League champion (2017); Kazakhstan Cup winner (2017); Greek 2nd Division champion (2013)
Medals
Head coach for Greece
Men's basketball
FIBA Europe Under-18 Championship
Gold medal – first place	2015 Greece	National Team
FIBA Europe Under-20 Championship B
Bronze medal – third place	2016 Greece	National Team
FIBA Europe Under-20 Championship
Gold medal – first place	2017 Greece	National Team

Ilias Papatheodorou (Greek: Ηλίας Παπαθεοδώρου; born 20 June 1975) is a Greek professional basketball coach, who is currently the head coach for Maroussi of the Greek Basketball League. He is also the coach of the Swiss national team.

== Coaching career ==
=== Clubs ===
Papatheodorou played basketball in the Athinaikos youth club systems in Greece, and as soon as he stopped playing youth level basketball, at age 20, he began his coaching career in the same Athinaikos club systems, working there from 1995 to 2001. He coached in the club's cadets, juniors, and senior men's teams. He became the assistant coach of the senior men's team for one season, in 2001, in the Greek lower divisions.

He then became the head coach of the Greek club Larissaikos, from 2002 to 2004, and also was Markopoulo's head coach from 2004 to 2007.

He became the head coach of the Greek club Nea Kifissia in 2007. With the club, he managed to achieve several league promotions up through the Greek lower leagues, and he led the club to the Greek top-tier level, the Greek Basket League, for the first time in its history, in 2013. He left the club in 2016.

After leaving Nea Kifissia, Papatheodorou was appointed as the head coach of the Kazakh NBL and VTB United League club Astana. With Astana, he won both the Kazakhstan League championship and the Kazakhstan Cup title. On May 27, 2017, Papatheodorou became the head coach of the Greek club PAOK, replacing Soulis Markopoulos.

On 19 June 2019, Papatheodorou signed a three-year contract with AEK Athens replacing Italian Luca Banchi.

In the summer of 2022, Papatheodorou returned to coaching at a club level and signed with Kolossos Rodou, replacing Ilias Kantzouris. After a relatively successful season with the island club, he moved to Promitheas Patras on May 19, 2023. On June 5, 2024, he renewed his contract with the club.

=== Greek junior national team ===
In 2013, Papatheodorou became the head coach of the Greek Under-18 junior national team. He has also been the head coach of the Greek Under-19 junior national team and the Greek Under-20 junior national team.

== Awards and accomplishments ==
=== Greek junior national team ===
- 2015 FIBA Europe Under-18 Championship: Gold
- 2016 FIBA Europe Under-20 Championship Division B: Bronze
- 2017 FIBA Europe Under-20 Championship: Gold

=== Pro clubs ===
- Greek 2nd Division Champion: (2013)
- Kazakhstan League Champion: (2017)
- Kazakhstan Cup Winner: (2017)
