= Hellenic Basketball Federation =

Basketball governing body in Greece

- Founded: 1932; 94 years ago
- Affiliation: FIBA Europe
- Headquarters: Athens
- President: Aggelos Papanikolaou

Official website
- www.basket.gr

The Hellenic Basketball Federation (abbreviated HBF; Greek: Ελληνική Ομοσπονδία Καλαθοσφαίρισης, abbreviated as Ε.Ο.Κ.,) is the main basketball governing body for the sport in Greece. It directs and oversees all of the national basketball teams of Greece, including both the junior and senior national teams, of both men and women. From 1969 to 1992, the E.O.K. also solely oversaw the top-tier level men's Greek National Basketball League, before its basic operation was taken over by HEBA, starting with the 1992–93 basketball season.

In 2026, Vangelis Liolios, the Federation's president, was arrested alongside 5 other people, including referees, with the charge of fixing matches.

== Hellenic Basketball Federation presidents ==
Period	President (chairman)
HBF president (birth–death)
December 1975 – July 1977	Vladimiros Vallas (1914–1988)
July 1977 – February 1998	Zacharias Alexandrou (1925–2022)
February 1998 – November 2002	George Vassilakopoulos (1939–Present)
April 2002 – December 2002	Petros Kapagerov (1941–2002)
January 2003 – 31 August 2010	Andreas Miaoulis (1938–2010)
September 2010 – September 2021	George Vassilakopoulos (1939–Present)
September 2021 – October 2026	Vangelis Liolios (1967–Present)
October 2026 - Present	Aggelos Papanikolaou (1981-Present)
HBF Honorary president
April 2002 – April 2022	Zacharias Alexandrou (1925–2022)

== Competitions organized ==
The E.O.K. organizes numerous club and national team competitions. Among them are:

=== Club competitions ===
- Men's Greek Cup
- Men's Greek 2nd Division
- Men's Greek 2nd Division Cup
- Men's Greek 3rd Division
- Men's Greek 4th Division
- Women's Greek League
- Women's Greek Cup
- Women's Greek 2nd Division

=== National team competitions ===
- Men's Acropolis International Tournament

=== Club competitions ===
- Men's Greek League: (1969–1992)
- Men’s Greek Super Cup: (1986)

== National team honours at major tournaments ==
=== Men's National Team ===
- FIBA World Cup

- (silver) Silver: (1): 2006

- EuroBasket

- (gold) Gold: (2): 1987, 2005
- (silver) Silver: (1): 1989
- (bronze) Bronze: (3): 1949, 2009, 2025

=== Men's U-21 ===
- FIBA Under-21 World Cup

- (silver) Silver: (2): 2005

=== Men's U-20 ===
- FIBA Under-20 European Championship

- (gold) Gold: (3): 2002, 2009, 2017
- (silver) Silver: (2): 1992, 2010
- (bronze) Bronze: (1): 2023, 2024

=== Men's U-19 ===
- FIBA Under-19 World Cup

- (gold) Gold: (1): 1995
- (silver) Silver: (1): 2009
- (bronze) Bronze: (1): 2003

=== Men's U-18 ===
- FIBA Under-18 European Championship

- (gold) Gold: (2): 2008, 2015
- (silver) Silver: (2): 1970, 2007
- (bronze) Bronze: (3): 1998, 2000, 2002

=== Men's U-16 ===
- FIBA Under-16 European Championship

- (gold) Gold: (2): 1989, 1993
- (silver) Silver: (3): 1975, 1991, 1999
- (bronze) Bronze: (2): 1995, 2013

== See also ==
- Greek Basketball League
- Greek A2 Basket League
- Greek B Basket League
- Greek C Basket League
- Greek Basketball Cup
- Greek Women's League
- Greek Women's Cup
- Acropolis International Basketball Tournament
- Greek Men National Basketball Team
- Greek Women National Basketball Team
- Greek Men Under-21 National Basketball Team
- Greek Men Under-20 National Basketball Team
- Greek Men Under-19 and Under-18 National Basketball Team
- Greek Men Under-17 National Basketball Team
- Greek Men Under-16 National Basketball Team
