= Kastoria B.C. =

AS Kastoria Arosis
- Leagues: Greek 4th Division; Greek Cup
- Founded: 1980; 46 years ago
- History: Kastoria B.C. (1980–present)
- Arena: Dimitris Diamantidis Indoor Hall
- Capacity: 650
- Location: Kastoria, Greece
- Team colors: White and Black
- President: Ioannis Kotsis
- Vice-presidents: Tasos Langiotis; Argyris Kranias
- Team manager: Papadimitriou Vasilis; Panagioris Kalogiros
- Head coach: Georgios Karataglidis
- Championships: Greek 3rd Division (2017)
- Website: askastorias.gr
Home	Away

Kastoria B.C. (Greek: Καστοριάς K.A.E.), is a Greek professional basketball club that is based in Kastoria, Greece. The club's full name is Athlitikos Syllogos Kastorias (Αθλητικός Σύλλογος Καστοριάς), which is abbreviated as A.S. Kastoria (Α.Σ. Καστοριάς). The club's colors are white and black, and the team's emblem is a beaver.

== History ==
Kastoria played in the Greek 4th-tier level, the Greek C League, in the 2006–07 season. The club was promoted up to the 3rd-tier level, the Greek B League, for the 2015–16 season. The club then moved up to the 2nd-tier level, the Greek A2 League, for the 2017–18 season.

The well-known Greek player, Dimitris Diamantidis, began his career with the club's youth teams.

== Arena ==
Kastoria plays its home games at the Dimitris Diamantidis Indoor Hall, which is named after the well-known Greek basketball player, Dimitris Diamantidis.

== Season by season ==
Season	Tier	Division	Pos.	W–L	Greek Cup	European competitions
2006–07	4	C Basket League	12th	8–18		
2013–14	4	C Basket League	9th	9–13		
2014–15	4	C Basket League	3rd	20–6		
2015–16	3	B Basket League	4th	19–9		
2016–17	3	B Basket League	1st	25–5		
2017–18	2	A2 Basket League				

== Honours ==
Total titles: 1

=== Domestic competitions ===
- Greek 3rd Division

Winners (1): 2016–17

== Notable players ==
Note: Flags indicate national team eligibility at FIBA-sanctioned events. Players may hold other non-FIBA nationalities not displayed.

Criteria

To appear in this section a player must have either:

- Set a club record or won an individual award while at the club
- Played at least one official international match for their national team at any time
- Played at least one official NBA match at any time.

- Tasos Charismidis
- Nikos Kaklamanos
- Ioannis Karamalegkos
- Giannis Kyriakopoulos

=== Youth players ===
- Dimitris Diamantidis
