= Charilaos Trikoupis Messolonghi B.C. =

Greek professional basketball team

Messolonghi Basketball Club
- Leagues: Greek Elite League; Greek Cup
- Founded: 1955 (Parent Athletic Club); 1959 (Basketball Club)
- History: 1959–present
- Arena: Mesologi basket hall
- Capacity: 1,500
- Location: Mesologgi, Greece
- Team colors: Blue, Red and White
- President: Vasiliki Belekou
- Head coach: Nikolaos Kladis
- Championships: Greek 2nd Division: (1)
- Website: trikoupisbc.gr
Home	Away

Charilaos Trikoupis Messolonghi B.C. (alternate spelling: Messolonghi) (Greek: Χαρίλαος Τρικούπης Μεσολογγίου K.A.E.) is a Greek professional basketball team that is located in Messolonghi, Greece, with its regular home base being in the city of Messolonghi, Greece. The team's name is often shortened to either Trikoupis B.C. or Messolonghi B.C. It is a part of the multi-sports club Gymnastikos Syllogos Charilaos Trikoupis Messolonghi (Greek: Γυμναστικός Σύλλογος Χαρίλαος Τρικούπης Μεσολογγίου), which is abbreviated as G.S. Charilaos Trikoupis Messolonghi.

The club is named after Charilaos Trikoupis, who served seven terms as the Prime Minister of Greece, in the 19th century. The club's logo also features a depiction of Trikoupis.

Logo used until the 2019–20 season.

== History ==
The club's parent athletic association, G.S. Charilaos Trikoupis Messolonghi (Γ.Σ. Χαρίλαος Τρικούπης Μεσολογγίου) was founded in 1955. The men's basketball section of the club was founded in 1959. From 1959 to 1971, the club organized local basketball tournaments and competed in friendly games.

From 1971 to 1982, the club competed in local minor league competitions. Starting with the 1982–83 season, the club began to compete in the regional minor league Association of Basketball Clubs of Northwestern Greece, or E.S.KA.V.D.E. (Ε.Σ.ΚΑ.Β.Δ.Ε). For the 1993–94 season, the club was promoted up to a Greek national competition for the first time, as it joined the Greek 4th Division. The club stayed in the Greek 4th Division for five straight seasons, through the 1997–98 season. After that, the club again played in the local and regional competitions.

For the 2015–16 season, Trikoupis rejoined the Greek 4th Division. The club then played in the Greek 3rd Division for the first time, in the 2016–17 season. Trikoupis then competed in the Greek 2nd Division for the first time, in the 2018–19 season. The team then managed to win the Greek 2nd Division championship, in the 2019–20 season, with a 19–2 league record, and thus earn a league promotion up to the top-tier level Greek Basket League, for the following season.

Trikoupis then competed in the Greek 1st Division, for the first time, in the 2020–21 season.

== Arena ==
The traditional home arena of Trikoupis is the Missolonghi Indoor Hall, which is located in Missolonghi, Greece. When the club temporarily moved to Agrinio, Greece, for the 2020–21 season, it played its home games at the 1,500 seat Michalis Kousis Agrinio Indoor Hall, which is named in honor of the late Greek marathon runner Michalis Kousis.

== Season by season ==
Season	[[Greek basketball league system|Tier]]	League	Pos.	W–L	[[Greek Basketball Cup|Greek Cup]]	[[Greek basketball clubs in European and worldwide competitions|European competitions]]
1993–94	4	C Basket League				
1994–95	4	C Basket League				
1995–96	4	C Basket League				
1996–97	4	C Basket League	8th			
1997–98	4	C Basket League	10th			
2015–16	4	C Basket League	3rd	19–8		
2016–17	3	B Basket League	9th	15–15		
2017–18	3	B Basket League	2nd	22–6	Phase 1 – Round 2	
2018–19	2	A2 Basket League	5th	17–14	Phase 1 – Round 2	
2019–20	2	A2 Basket League	1st	19–2	Phase 2 – Round 1	
2020–21	1	Basket League	12th	5–17	Phase 2 – Round 1	

== Titles and honors ==
=== Domestic competitions ===
- Greek 2nd Division

Champions (1): (2020)

== Roster ==
Note: Flags indicate national team eligibility at FIBA-sanctioned events. Players may hold other non-FIBA nationalities not displayed.

Charilaos Trikoupis roster
Players	Coaches
Pos. / No. / Nat. / Name / Ht. / Wt. / Age	Head coach: (Greece); Assistant coach(es): (Greece); Team Manager: (Greece); Legend: (C) Team captain; Injured; Roster; Updated: 11 November 2022

== Notable players ==
Note: Flags indicate national team eligibility at FIBA-sanctioned events. Players may hold other non-FIBA nationalities not displayed.

Criteria

To appear in this section a player must have either:

- Set a club record or won an individual award while at the club
- Played at least one official international match for their national team at any time
- Played at least one official NBA match at any time.

- (Greece) Tasos Antonakis
- (Greece) Ioannis Agravanis
- (Greece) Ioannis Chatzinikolas
- (Greece) Ioannis Demertzis
- (Greece) Dimitris Gravas
- (Greece) Spyros Motsenigos
- (Greece) Sokratis Naoumis
- (Greece) Stathis Papadionysiou
- (Greece) Ioannis Sachpatzidis
- (Greece) Dionysis Skoulidas
- (Greece) Fotis Vasilopoulos
- (Serbia) Stefan Đorđević
- (Serbia) Danilo Ostojić
- (Canada) Richard Amardi
- (United States) Chad Brown
- (United States) A. J. Davis
- (United States) Toddrick Gotcher
- (United States) Devonte Green
- (United States) Kevin Langford
- (United States) Eugene Lawrence
- (United States) Mark Lyons

== Head coaches ==
- (Greece) Georgios Deraos: (2015–16)
- (Greece) Panagiotis Zontos: (2016–18)
- (Greece) Giannis Dimitriadis: (2018–19)
- (Greece) Savvas Arapatsanis: (2019)
- (Greece) Dinos Kalampakos: (2019–2021)
