= Machites Doxas Pefkon B.C. =

A.S. Machites Doxas Pefkon
- Leagues: Greek A2 League; Greek Cup
- Founded: 2011
- History: Doxa Retzikiou B.C. (2011 – 2012); Machites Doxas Pefkon B.C. (2012 – Present)
- Arena: DAK Pefkon
- Capacity: 350
- Location: Pefka, Thessaloniki, Greece
- Team colors: Dark Blue and Yellow
- Website: machitesbc.gr
Home	Away

Machites Doxas Pefkon B.C., or simply Machites B.C. (alternate spellings: Mahites, Doxa) (Greek: Μαχητές Δόξας Πεύκων K.A.E.), is a Greek professional basketball team that is located in Pefka, Thessaloniki, Greece. The athletic club's full name is Athlitikos Syllogos Machites Doxas Pefkon (Greek: Αθλητικός Σύλλογος Μαχητές Δόξας Πεύκων), abbreviated as A.S. Machites Doxas Pefkon. The club's name can be translated in English to "Glory Fighters Pines".

== History ==
Doxa Retzikiou (Greek: Δόξα Ρετζικίου) played in the 4th-tier level Greek C Basket League during the 2011–12 season. Then, in 2012, Doxa Retzikiou and Machites Pefkon (Μαχητές Πεύκων) merged, to form the club of Machites Doxas Pefkon, in its current form. The club then played in the 3rd-tier level Greek B Basket League during the 2012–13, 2013–14, and 2014–15 seasons.

The club then moved up to the 2nd-tier level Greek A2 Basket League, where it played in the 2015–16 and the 2016–17 seasons.

== Roster ==
Machites Doxas Pefkon B.C. roster
Players
Coaches

Pos.	No.	Nat.	Name	Ht.	Wt.	Age
PG	4	(Greece)	Chatzikyriakidis, Dimitris	1.92 m (6 ft 4 in)		26 – 31 October 1998
PG	5	(Greece)	Nikolakopoulos, Konstantinos	1.84 m (6 ft 0 in)		37 – 1 March 1988
G	6	(Greece)	Velissariou, Petros	1.93 m (6 ft 4 in)
F	9	(Greece)	Kalabakas, Dimitris	2.02 m (6 ft 8 in)		35 – 10 August 1989
SF	10	(Greece)	Naoumis, Apostolos	1.98 m (6 ft 6 in)		31 – 1 April 1993
SF	11	(Greece)	Stolis, Dimitris	1.98 m (6 ft 6 in)
G	12	(Greece)	Diplaros, Nikos	1.90 m (6 ft 3 in)		27 – 28 June 1997
F/C	18	(Norway)	Jawara, Karamo	2.03 m (6 ft 8 in)	107 kg (236 lb)	33 – 25 June 1991

Head coach

Lefteris Chatzikyriakidis

Assistant coach(es)

Stelios Chalikias

Legend

- (C) Team captain
- Injured

- Roster
Updated: 09/04/2017

== Notable players ==
Note: Flags indicate national team eligibility at FIBA-sanctioned events. Players may hold other non-FIBA nationalities not displayed.

Criteria

To appear in this section a player must have either:

- Set a club record or won an individual award while at the club
- Played at least one official international match for their national team at any time
- Played at least one official NBA match at any time.

- Petros Geromichalos
- Dimitris Gravas
- Nikos Diplaros
- Sakis Tataris
- Sigurður Þorsteinsson
- Karamo Jawara
