= Dafni, Attica =

Dafni Δάφνη
- Municipal unit
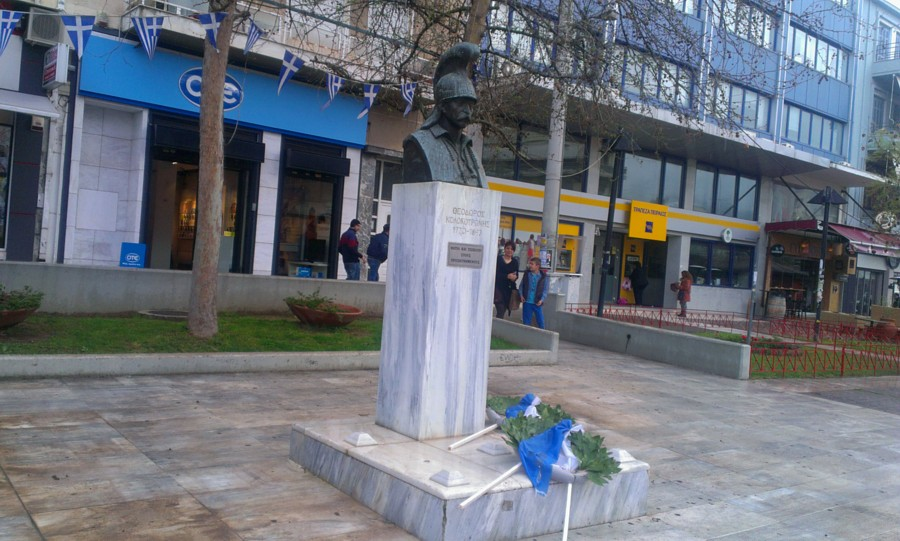

- Location within Central Athens regional unit

- Location within Greece
- Coordinates: 37°57′N 23°44′E
- Country: Greece
- Administrative region: Attica
- Regional unit: Central Athens
- Municipality: Dafni-Ymittos

Area
  - Municipal unit: 1.375 km^{2} (0.531 sq mi)
- Elevation: 80 m (260 ft)

Population (2021)
  - Municipal unit: 23,431
  - Municipal unit density: 17,040/km^{2} (44,140/sq mi)
- Time zone: UTC+2 (EET)
  - Summer (DST): UTC+3 (EEST)
- Postal code: 172 xx
- Area code: 210
- Website: dafni-ymittos.gov.gr

Dafni (Greek: Δάφνη) is a suburban town in the Athens agglomeration, Greece. Since the 2011 local government reform it is part of the municipality Dafni-Ymittos, of which it is the seat and a municipal unit.

== Geography ==
Dafni is an inner suburb of Athens, 2 km south of the Acropolis of Athens. Its built-up area is continuous with that of municipality of Athens and the surrounding suburbs Nea Smyrni, Agios Dimitrios and Ymittos. Dafni metro station is served by Line 2 of the Athens Metro. The main thoroughfare is Vouliagmenis Avenue, which connects Dafni with Athens city centre. At 1.375 km^{2} it is one of the smallest municipal units in the Athens urban and metropolitan area.

== Sports ==
The Amyntas Dafnis HEBA basketball club (A2 Division) competes at the Dafni Indoor Hall.

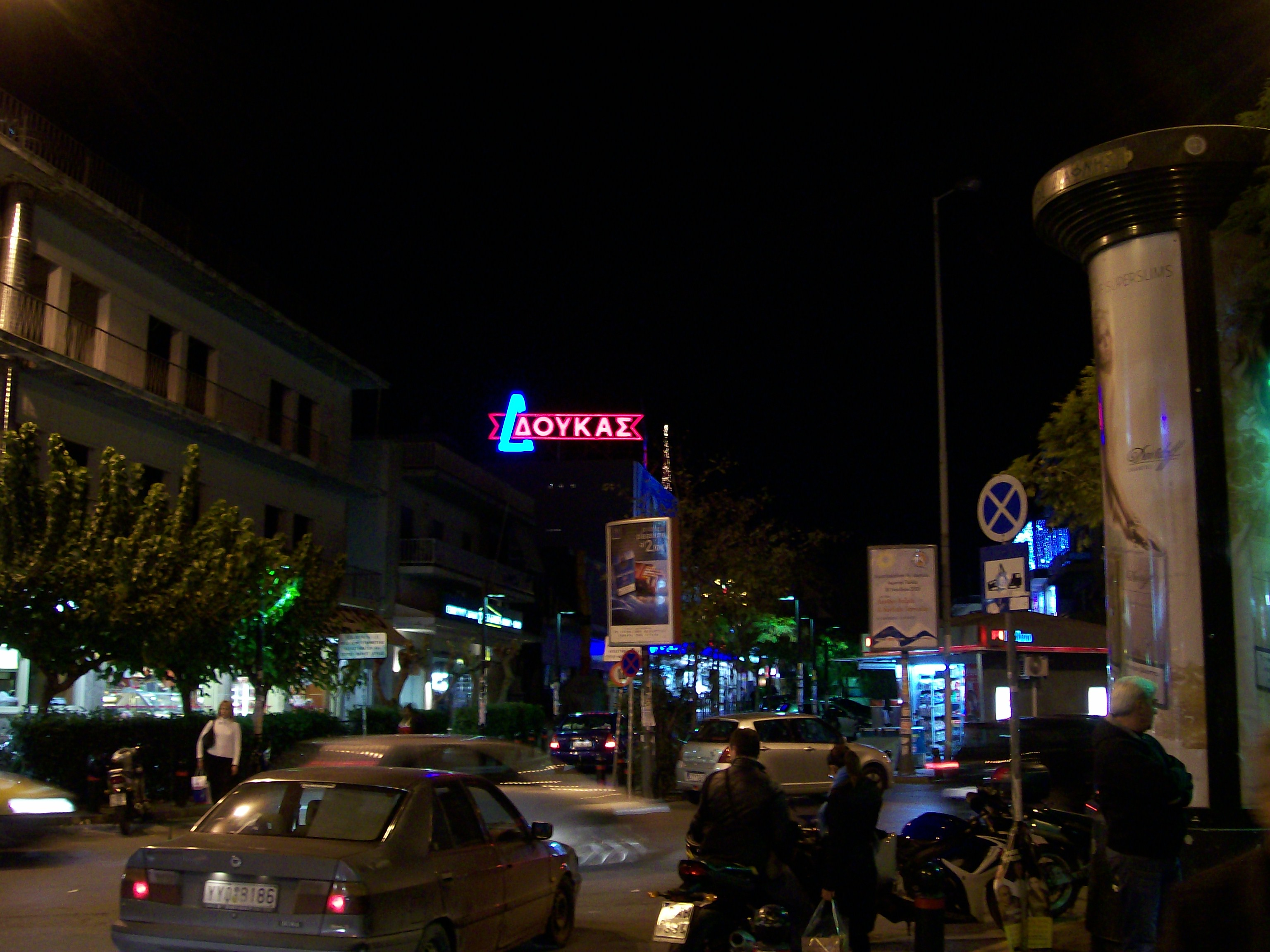
Nighttime scene of Kalogyrous Square, Dafni, Athens, Greece
