= Dafni-Ymittos =

Dafni-Ymittos Δάφνη-Υμηττός
- Municipality
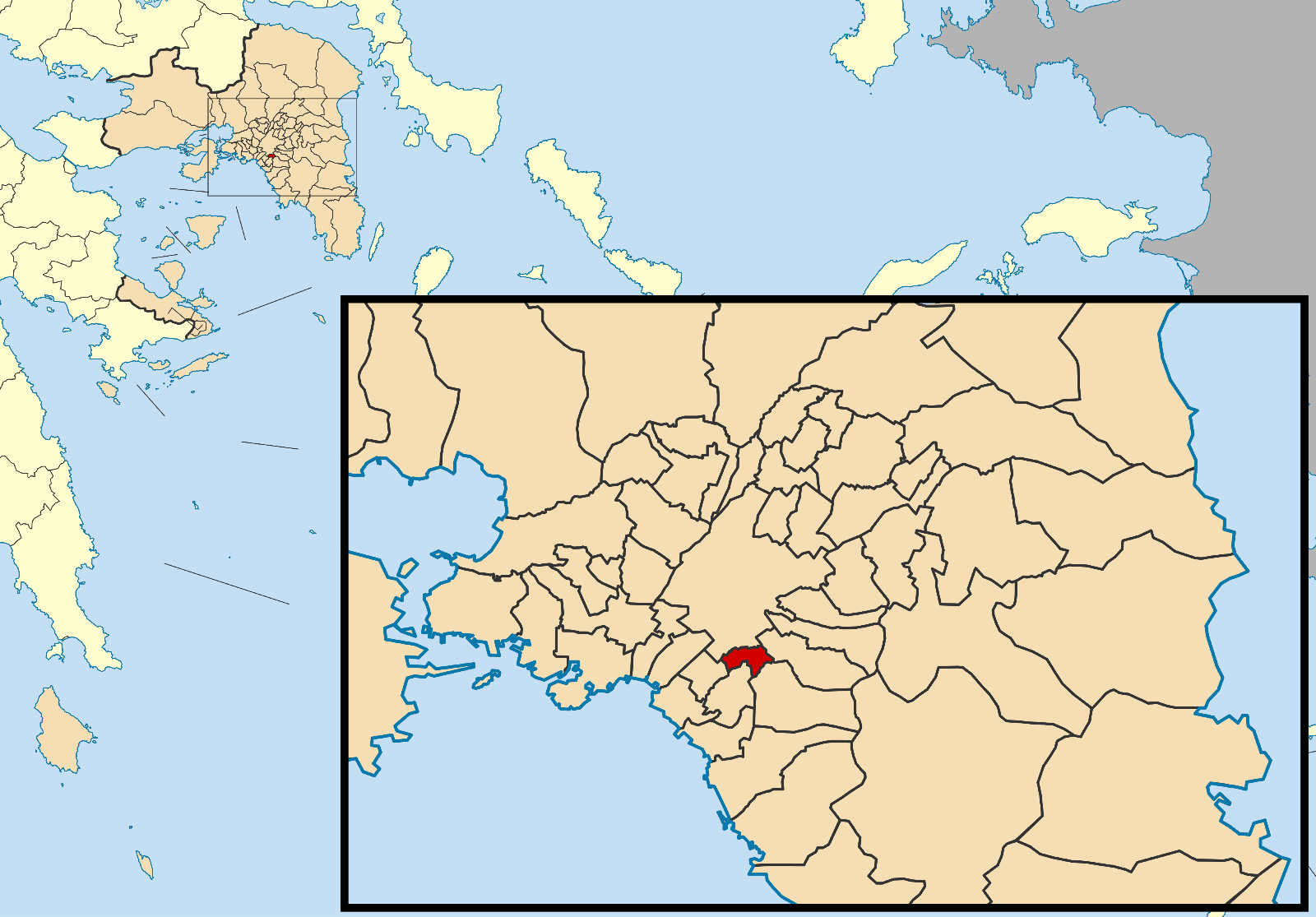

- Location within Greece
- Coordinates: 37°57′N 23°43′E
- Country: Greece
- Administrative region: Attica
- Regional unit: Central Athens
- Seat: Dafni

Government
  - Mayor: Nikolaos Tsilifis (since 01/01/2024)

Area
  - Municipality: 2.35 km^{2} (0.91 sq mi)
- Elevation: 60–145 m (197–476 ft)

Population (2021)
  - Municipality: 33,886
  - Density: 14,400/km^{2} (37,300/sq mi)
- Time zone: UTC+2 (EET)
  - Summer (DST): UTC+3 (EEST)
- Postal code: 172 36 or 172 37
- Website: dafni-ymittos.gov.gr

Dafni-Ymittos (Greek: Δάφνη-Υμηττός) is a municipality in the Central Athens regional unit, Attica, Greece. The seat of the municipality is the town Dafni. The municipality has an area of 2.350 km^{2}.

== Municipality ==
The municipality Dafni–Ymittos was formed at the 2011 local government reform by the merger of the following 2 former municipalities, that became municipal units:

- Dafni
- Ymittos
