= Amyntas B.C. =

Amyntas
- Leagues: Greek A2 League; Greek Cup
- Founded: 1950; 75 years ago
- History: Amyntas Ymittos B.C. 1950–2010; Amyntas Dafnis–Ymittos B.C. 2010–2011; Amyntas B.C. 2011–present
- Arena: Pyrkal Ymittos Indoor Hall
- Capacity: 600
- Location: Dafni-Ymittos, Dafni, Athens, Greece
- Head coach: Dimitris Liogas
- Website: amyntas.gr
Home	Away

Amyntas B.C. (Greek: Α.Ο. Αμύντας), commonly known as Amyntas, is a Greek professional basketball club. The club's full name is Athlitikos Omilos Amyntas Ymittos B.C. The club is located in Dafni-Ymittos, Dafni, a suburb of Athens, Greece. The colors of the team are blue and orange. The club is named after the father of Philip II of Macedon, and grandfather of Alexander the Great, Amyntas III of Macedon. The club's emblem is King Amyntas.

== History ==
Amyntas B.C. was originally founded in 1950. In 2010, Dafni and A.O. Amyntas merged, creating A.O. Amyntas Dafnis - Ymittos. The club then competed in the 2nd-tier level Greek A2 Basket League, during the 2010–11 season. After that, the two clubs separated again.

== Arena ==
Amyntas plays its home games at the 600 seat Pyrkal Ymittos Indoor Hall.

== Roster ==
Note: Flags indicate national team eligibility at FIBA-sanctioned events. Players may hold other non-FIBA nationalities not displayed.

Amyntas B.C. roster
Players
Coaches

Pos.	No.	Nat.	Name	Ht.	Wt.	Age
PG	4	(Greece)	Zoupas, Leonidas	1.82 m (6 ft 0 in)		43 – 18 January 1982
G	5	(Greece)	Angelopoulos, Ioannis	1.84 m (6 ft 0 in)		36 – 19 July 1988
F	7	(Greece)	Diamantopoulos, Spyros	1.97 m (6 ft 6 in)		41 – 24 April 1983
SF	9	(Greece)	Vardianos, Thodoris	1.93 m (6 ft 4 in)		46 – 23 October 1978
G/F	10	(Greece)	Mansarai, Vaggelis	1.95 m (6 ft 5 in)		28 – 6 August 1996
G	13	(Greece)	Barbas, Christos	1.88 m (6 ft 2 in)		42 – 29 April 1982
F/C	16	(Greece)	Vogiatzis, Kostas	2.02 m (6 ft 8 in)		41 – 16 September 1983
F/C	16	(Greece)	Koukounias, Panagiotis	2.02 m (6 ft 8 in)		36 – 28 May 1988
G/F		(Albania)	Topalli, Adriano	1.90 m (6 ft 3 in)		31 – 1 February 1994
G/F		(Greece)	Oikonomou, Panagiotis	1.98 m (6 ft 6 in)	86 kg (190 lb)	24 – 9 March 2001

Head coach

- (Greece) Mais Konstantinidis

Legend

- (C) Team captain
- Injured

- Roster
Updated: August 15, 2017

== Notable players ==
Note: Flags indicate national team eligibility at FIBA-sanctioned events. Players may hold other non-FIBA nationalities not displayed.

Criteria

To appear in this section a player must have either:

- Set a club record or won an individual award while at the club
- Played at least one official international match for their national team at any time
- Played at least one official NBA match at any time.

- Dimitris Cheilaris
- Spyros Diamantopoulos
- Periklis Dorkofikis
- Ioannis Karamalegkos
- Dimitrios Lolas
- Costas Rigas
- Christos Zoupas
