= Psychiko B.C. =

Athletic Union Psychikou
- Leagues: Greek Elite League; Greek Cup
- Founded: 1985
- Arena: Psychiko Indoor Hall
- Capacity: 300
- Location: Psychiko, Athens, Greece
- Team colors: Yellow and blue
- President: Pantelis Xyridakis
- Vice-president: Panagis Karelas
- Head coach: Giorgos Remedelas
- Championships: 1 Greek B Championship (2013)
- Website: aeps.gr

Psychiko B.C. (alternate spelling: Psychikou) is a Greek professional basketball club that is located in Psychiko, Greece. The athletic club's full name is Athlitiki Enosi Psychikou (Greek: Αθλητική Ένωση Ψυχικού), which is abbreviated as A.E.PS. (Α.Ε.Ψ.), and which means Athletic Union of Psychiko.The home of the team is a small indoor hall called Psychiko Indoor Hall.

== History ==
Psychiko was founded in 1985, by Dimitris Chouliarakis, who was the President of the club, until his death in 2013. In 2012, the club was promoted to the Greek 2nd Division, because of the relegation of Panellinios, due to their financial problems. Since 2013, Psychiko has been competing in the Greek 2nd Division. In 2022, Psychiko finally achieved a promotion to the Greek Basket League, but subsequently failed to gather the legal paperwork and monetary funds required in order to compete in the 2022-2023 season.

== Arena ==
The club plays its home games at the Psychiko Indoor Hall -named Dimitris Chouliarakis-, a small arena with a capacity of about 300.

== Titles and honors ==
- Greek 3rd Division Champion: (2013)

== Roster ==
Note: Flags indicate national team eligibility at FIBA-sanctioned events. Players may hold other non-FIBA nationalities not displayed.

Psychiko B.C. roster
Players
Coaches

Pos.	No.	Nat.	Name	Ht.	Wt.	Age
PG	3	(Greece)	Koukas, Giorgos	1.79 m (5 ft 10 in)		41 – 8 May 1985
F/C	7	(Greece)	Papanikolaou, Nikos	2.09 m (6 ft 10 in)	109 kg (240 lb)	41 – 1 June 1985
C	14	(Greece)	Xanthopoulos, Giannos	2.04 m (6 ft 8 in)		20 – 1 January 2006
F	15	(Greece)	Athanasoulas, Ioannis	2.02 m (6 ft 8 in)	107 kg (236 lb)	39 – 21 January 1987
SF	18	(Greece)	Arfaras, Michael-Aggelos	1.98 m (6 ft 6 in)		22 – 10 February 2004
SG	19	(Greece)	Anagnostopoulos, Charis	1.93 m (6 ft 4 in)		25 – 1 January 2001
G		(United States)	Burke, Isaiah	1.85 m (6 ft 1 in)	82 kg (181 lb)	26 – 31 January 2000
G		(Greece)	Oikonomopoulos, Sotiris	1.92 m (6 ft 4 in)	85 kg (187 lb)	23 – 29 August 2003

Head coach

- (Greece) Giorgos Rementelas

Legend

- (C) Team captain
- Injured

- Roster
Updated: 22 August 2023

== Notable players ==
Note: Flags indicate national team eligibility at FIBA-sanctioned events. Players may hold other non-FIBA nationalities not displayed.

Criteria

To appear in this section a player must have either:

- Set a club record or won an individual award while at the club
- Played at least one official international match for their national team at any time
- Played at least one official NBA match at any time.

- Ioannis Dimakos
- Christos Iordanou
- Antonis Mantzaris
- Dimitris Marmarinos
- Vassilis Mouratos
- Petros Noeas
- - Alfa Ntiallo
- Nikos Papanikolaou
- - Nick Paulos
- Alekos Petroulas
- Nikos Pettas
- Michalis Polytarchou
- Ioannis Psathas
- John Sinis
- Damir Latović
