= Ethnikos Piraeus B.C. =

- Leagues: National League 1 Greek Cup
- Founded: 21 November 1923
- Arena: Panagiotis Salpeas Hall
- Capacity: 100
- Location: Piraeus, Greece
- Team colors: Blue and White
- President: Dimitris Karafantis
- Head coach: Nasos Choubavlis
- Website: ethnikos-bc.gr
Home	Away

Ethnikos Piraeus B.C. is the basketball department of the Greek multi-sport club of Ethnikos Piraeus or Ethnikos OFPF (National Club of Fans of Piraeus and Phalerum). It is based in Piraeus and its home is the Panagiotis Salpeas Gymnasium. In the current season, Ethnikos Piraeus plays in the third division of the Greek basketball league system. The team's colours are white and blue.

== History ==
During the decade of the 1970s, Ethnikos played in the Beta Ethniki (second national league), and came close to reaching promotion to the top-tier level A Ethniki (first national league). The former president of FIBA Europe, George Vassilakopoulos, competed in Ethnikos Piraeus. In the subsequent following years, Ethnikos' standing as a club declined, and it played in the lower minor league Greek divisions.

In recent years, the club was promoted almost every year, as it climbed up to the Greek 2nd Division. Ethnikos was promoted 3 times, in 3 years (in 2012, 2013, and 2014). In 2014, Ethnikos was promoted to the Greek A2 Basket League (second division), after beating Livadeia in a one off playoff game.

== Titles ==
Ethnikos has won the amateur level cup of the South Attica regional (ESKANA) 3 times.

The results of Ethnikos' 3 ESKANA local regional cup finals wins:

- 2009 : Ethnikos – Perama 66 – 62
- 2012 : Ethnikos – Milon 69 – 63
- 2014 : Ethnikos – Proteas Voulas 83 – 77

== Roster ==
Ethnikos Piraeus roster
Players
Coaches

Pos.	No.	Nat.	Name	Ht.	Wt.	Age
SF		(Greece)	Siologkas, Dimitris	1.98 m (6 ft 6 in)		30 – 28 April 1994
PF		(Greece)	Dimitriadis, Tasos	2.04 m (6 ft 8 in)	100 kg (220 lb)	43 – 1 January 1982
PF		(Greece)	Sklivas, Antonis	2.03 m (6 ft 8 in)		29 – 6 July 1995
C		(Greece)	Machairas, Kostas	2.05 m (6 ft 9 in)		40 – 21 April 1984

Head coach

- (Greece) Vangelis Vlachos

Assistant coach(es)

- (Greece) Michalis Rachovitsas

Legend

- (C) Team captain
- Injured

- Roster
Updated: 26-09-2014

== Head coaches ==
- (Greece) Georgios Kalafatakis
