= 2015–16 Greek Basketball Cup =

Greek Basketball Cup
- Season: 2015–16
- Duration: September 23, 2015 – March 6, 2016
- Teams: 30

Finals
- Champions: Panathinaikos (17th title)
- Runners-up: Faros Keratsiniou
- Finals MVP: (Greece) Dimitris Diamantidis

The 2015–16 Greek Basketball Cup was the 41st edition of Greece's top-tier level professional national domestic basketball cup competition. The competition started on September 29, 2015, and ended on March 6, 2016.

== Format ==
The top six placed teams from the top-tier level Greek Basket League 2014–15 season, had an automatic bye to the quarterfinals. While the eight lower placed teams from the Greek Basket League 2014–15 season, along with the 16 teams from the 2nd-tier level Greek A2 Basket League 2015–16 season, played in preliminary rounds, competing for the other two quarterfinals places. The quarterfinals and onward rounds were played under a single elimination format.

== Bracket ==
Quarterfinals
Faros Keratsiniou	61
Nea Kifissia	59
PAOK	73
Rethymno Cretan Kings	67
Olympiacos	64
Panathinaikos	70
Aris	64
AEK	61

Semifinals
Faros Keratsiniou	69
PAOK	65
Panathinaikos	90
Aris	69

Final
Faros Keratsiniou	54
Panathinaikos	101

== Quarterfinals ==
October 7, 2015

PAOK	73–67	Rethymno Cretan Kings

PAOK Sports Arena, Thessaloniki

October 7, 2015

Aris	64–61	AEK

Alexandreio Melathron Nick Galis Hall, Thessaloniki

October 8, 2015

Faros Keratsiniou	61–59	Nea Kifissia

Pantelis Nikolaidis Indoor Hall, Keratsini, Piraeus, Athens

October 8, 2015

Report

Olympiacos	64–70	Panathinaikos
Scoring by quarter: 14–12, 12–14, 18–18, 20–26
Pts: Printezis 15		Pts: Diamantidis 16

Peace and Friendship Stadium, Piraeus, Athens
Attendance: 0

== Semifinals ==
December 27, 2015

Faros Keratsiniou	69–65	PAOK
Scoring by quarter: 18–14, 14–17, 19–17, 18–17

Pantelis Nikolaidis Indoor Hall, Keratsini, Piraeus, Athens

December 28, 2015

Report

Panathinaikos	90–69	Aris
Scoring by quarter: 24–16, 14–21, 31–11, 21–21

Olympic Indoor Hall, Marousi, Athens

== Final ==
This was the 12th straight Greek Cup Final appearance of Panathinaikos. Faros Keratsiniou was just the third team from the Greek 2nd Division that played in a Cup Final, after Panellinios in 1987, and Rethymno Aegean in 2007, previously accomplished the feat.

The game ended with the biggest margin between two teams in a Greek Cup Final in history. Panathinaikos broke the winning-margin record of Aris, who won 110–70 in the 1987 Greek Cup Final against Panellinios.

March 6, 2016
17:30 EET (UTC +2)

Report

Faros Keratsiniou	54–101	Panathinaikos
Scoring by quarter: 12–31, 14–26, 12–19, 16–25
Pts: Skordilis 14		Pts: Janković, Gist 13; Rebs: Gist 6 Asts: Calathes 7

Olympic Indoor Hall, Marousi, Athens

Faros Keratsiniou	Panathinaikos

Greek Basketball Cup Finals
41st Final
06 March 2016 - OAKA

Panathinaikos - Faros Keratsiniou 101–54 (57–26), Quarters: 31–12, 57–26, 76–38, 101–54. Referees: Piloidis, Anastopoulos II., Pantelidis

Panathinaikos (Djordjević): Haynes 8, Charalampopoulos 6, Bochoridis 9, Janković 13, Fotsis 4, Raduljica 3, Feldeine 11, Diamantidis 8, Gist 13, Calathes 9, Papagiannis 12, Kuzmić 5.

Faros Keratsiniou (Polemis): Papadopoulos 2, Kountouras, Karampoulas 11, Batis 2, Petrodimopoulos 4, Liakopoulos 4, Angelopoulos 7, Kompodietas 3, Katoufas 2, Kakiouzis, Papamakarios 5, Skordilis 14.

MVP
(Greece) Dimitris Diamantidis
Game rules
Game was played under FIBA rules.

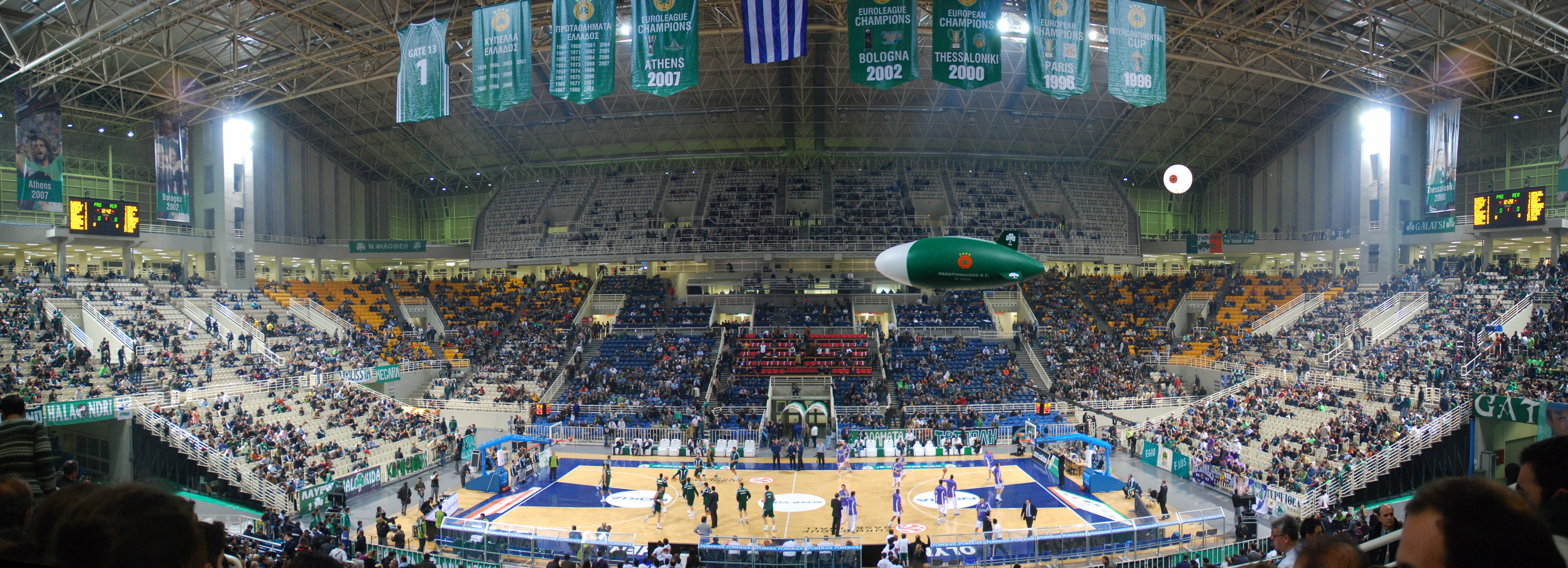
OAKA Indoor Hall

2016 Greek Cup Winners
Panathinaikos
(17th title)

== Awards ==
=== Most Valuable Player ===
Player	Team
(Greece) Dimitris Diamantidis	Panathinaikos

=== Finals Top Scorer ===
Player	Team
(Greece) Gaios Skordilis	Faros Keratsiniou
