= Marios Batis =

Greek basketball player

Marios Batis Μάριος Μπατής
Promitheas Patras
- Title: Head coach
- League: GBL

Personal information
- Born: 20 June 1980 (age 46) Keratsini, Piraeus, Greece
- Listed height: 6 ft 3 in (1.91 m)
- Listed weight: 210 lb (95 kg)

Career information
- Playing career: 1999–2020
- Position: Point guard / shooting guard
- Number: 5, 6, 8, 11
- Coaching career: 2020–present

Career history

Playing
- 1999–2003: Panionios
- 2003–2004: Irakleio
- 2004–2005: Near East
- 2005–2007: Ilysiakos
- 2007–2009: Olympia Larissa
- 2009–2010: Maroussi
- 2010–2014: Panionios
- 2014–2015: Apollon Patras
- 2015–2017: Faros Keratsiniou
- 2017–2020: Ionikos Nikaias
- 2020: Megarida

Coaching
- 2020–2021: Ionikos Nikaias (assistant)
- 2021–2022: AEK Athens (assistant)
- 2023: Greece (assistant)
- 2023–2024: Kolossos Rodou (assistant)
- 2024–2025: Maroussi (assistant)
- 2025–present: Promitheas Patras

Career highlights
- As a player: All-Greek League Defensive Team (2009); Greek 2nd Division champion (2019); Greek 3rd Division champion (2018)

Marios Batis (alternate spelling: Mpatis) (Greek: Μάριος Μπατής; born 20 June 1980) is a Greek former professional basketball player and current basketball coach. During his club playing career, at a height of is a 1.91 m (6 ft 3 in) tall, he played at the point guard and shooting guard positions.

== Professional career ==
After playing youth system basketball with the junior teams of the Greek club Faros Keratsiniou, Batis began his pro club career in the 1999–00 season, with Panionios Athens, where he competed in Greece's top-tier level Greek Basket League. With Panionios, he also competed in the now defunct European-wide secondary level competition, the FIBA Saporta Cup, in the 2001–02 season; and in the now defunct European-wide third-level competition, the FIBA EuroCup Challenge, in the 2002–03 season. For the following 2003–04 season, he moved to the Greek first division club Irakleio Crete.

After that, he played with Near East Athens, of the Greek 2nd Division, in the 2004–05 season. He spent the next two seasons with Ilysiakos Athens, of the Greek second division. He then played with Olympia Larissa for the next two seasons after that, where he competed in the Greek first division, and also in the now defunct European-wide third-tier level FIBA EuroChallenge competition, in the 2007–08 and 2008–09 seasons.

Batis spent the 2009–10 season with Maroussi Athens, where he played in the Greek first division, and also in the top-tier level European-wide competition, the EuroLeague. He then returned to the Greek club Panionios, where he played in the Greek first division, from 2010 to 2014. With Panionios, he also played in the European-wide secondary level competition, the EuroCup, in the 2012–13, and 2013–14 seasons.

In 2014, Batis joined the Greek first division club Apollon Patras. He then moved to the senior team of Faros Keratsiniou of the Greek 2nd Division. He played with Faros Keratsiniou during the 2015–16 and 2016–17 seasons.

In 2017, Batis joined the Greek 3rd Division club Ionikos Nikaias. In the subsequent 2017–18 3rd Division and 2018–19 2nd Division seasons, he helped Ionikos Nikaias to achieve two consecutive league titles and promotions, as the club moved up from Greece's third division, to the highest-tier level of Greek pro club basketball, the Greek Basket League, for the 2019–20 season. He finished his club playing career in 2020, after playing with Megaridas, of the Greek 3rd Division.

== Coaching career ==
Batis began working as a coach in 2020, when he became an assistant coach of the Greek Basket League club Ionikos Nikaias. In early 2021, he moved to AEK Athens, serving under head coaches Vangelis Angelou, Stefanos Dedas and Curro Segura. In July 2022, Batis parted ways with AEK.
