= Michalis Pelekanos =

Greek basketball player

Michalis Pelekanos Μιχάλης Πελεκάνος
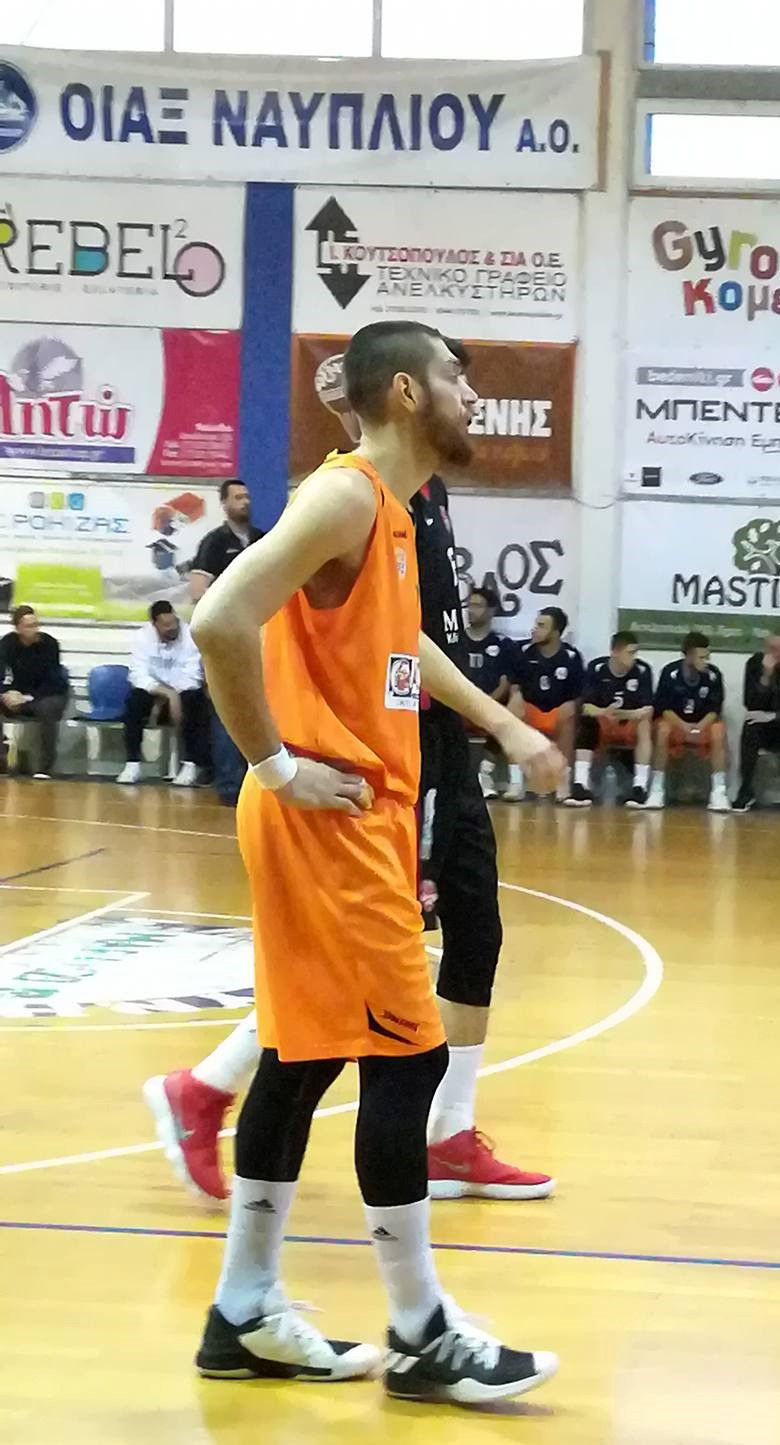
- Pelekanos (in orange) competing in a game with Oiakas Nafplio, in 2017.

Dionas Kyparissias
- Position: Small forward
- League: Greek 4th Division

Personal information
- Born: May 25, 1981 (age 45) Koridalos, Piraeus, Athens, Greece
- Listed height: 6 ft 6.5 in (1.99 m)
- Listed weight: 220 lb (100 kg)

Career information
- NBA draft: 2003: undrafted
- Playing career: 1999–present

Career history
- 1999–2004: Peristeri
- 2004–2006: AEK Athens
- 2006–2007: Panellinios
- 2007–2008: Real Madrid
- 2008–2012: Olympiacos
- 2009–2010: →Maroussi
- 2012–2014: Aris Thessaloniki
- 2014–2015: CSU Ploiești
- 2015–2016: Aris Thessaloniki
- 2016–2017: Panionios
- 2017–2019: Oiakas Nafplio
- 2019–2020: Ifaistos Limnou
- 2020–2021: Oiakas Nafplio
- 2021–2022: Ermionis Pieraias
- 2022: Gymnastikos S. Almyrou
- 2022–2023: Dionas Kyparissias

Career highlights
- EuroLeague champion (2012); Greek League champion (2012); Greek Cup winner (2011); 3× Greek All-Star (2001, 2003, 2010); Romanian League champion (2015); Romanian Supercup winner (2014); Greek 2nd Division champion (2017); Greek 3rd Division champion (2019)

Michalis Pelekanos (alternate spelling: Mihalis, Greek: Μιχάλης Πελεκάνος; born May 25, 1981) is a Greek professional basketball player. During his pro club career, at a height of 199 cm (6 ft 6 1/2 in) tall, Pelekanos played primarily at the small forward position. However, he also played as a shooting guard in the early part of his career, and as a power forward, in the latter part of his career. During his playing career, Pelekanos was mostly known for his spectacular athletic ability and defensive prowess.

With the Greek club Olympiacos Piraeus, Pelekanos won the EuroLeague championship at the 2012 EuroLeague Final Four. Pelekanos also represented the senior Greek national team at the 2008 Beijing Summer Olympics.

== Early life and youth career ==
Pelekanos was born on 25 May 1981, in Koridalos, Piraeus, Athens, Greece. At a young age, he began playing the sport of basketball with the youth teams of the Greek sports club Peristeri. The club is based in Peristeri, which is a suburb of Athens.

== Professional career ==
Pelekanos began his pro career in Greece, with Peristeri Athens of the Greek Basket League. He later joined the Greek club AEK Athens, followed by the Greek club Panellinios Athens. After a career year at Panellinios, in the 2006–07 season, in which he made the home crowd fans of Panellinios chant his name during games, due to his exciting defensive plays, run down blocked shots, and highlight reel slam dunks, Pelekanos moved to the EuroLeague giants Real Madrid, of the Spanish ACB League.

In 2008, Pelekanos signed a 3-year contract worth €2.1 million euros net income, with the Greek club Olympiacos Piraeus. In August 2009, he was loaned by Olympiacos to the Greek club Maroussi Athens. With Olympiacos, he won both the EuroLeague and Greek League championships, in 2012.

Pelekanos then signed with the Greek club Aris Thessaloniki, for the 2012–13 season. In July 2014, he moved to the Romanian National League club CSU Ploiești, on a one-year deal. With Ploiești, he won the Romanian League's championship.

In July 2015, Pelekanos returned to Aris, after he signed a two-year contract with the club. He was officially released from the team on July 21, 2016. He then moved to the Greek club Panionios Athens, where he played for one season, in the Greek 2nd Division.

Pelekanos spent the 2019–20 season with the Greek 1st Division club Ifaistos Limnou. In his pro club career, Pelekanos played in the European top-tier level EuroLeague, in a total of nine different seasons, with five different teams (Peristeri, AEK Athens, Real Madrid, Olympiacos, and Maroussi).

== National team career ==
After playing with Greece's Under-20 junior national team in the youth categories, Pelekanos was a member of the senior men's Greek national team. Pelekanos played in his first major tournament with Greece, at the 2007 EuroBasket, where Greece finished the tournament in fourth place. He also competed with the senior Greek national team at the 2008 FIBA World OQT, and at the 2008 Summer Olympics, where Greece finished the tournament in fifth place.

== Career statistics ==
Legend
GP	Games played	GS	Games started	MPG	Minutes per game
FG%	Field-goal percentage	3P%	3-point field-goal percentage	FT%	Free-throw percentage
RPG	Rebounds per game	APG	Assists per game	SPG	Steals per game
BPG	Blocks per game	PPG	Points per game	PIR	Performance index rating
**Bold**	Career high

=== EuroLeague ===
†	Denotes seasons in which Pelekanos won the EuroLeague

Year	Team	GP	GS	MPG	FG%	3P%	FT%	RPG	APG	SPG	BPG	PPG	PIR
2000–01	Peristeri	12	2	22.4	.434	.333	.800	2.4	.3	1.3	.5	5.8	4.8
2001–02	Peristeri	14	3	21.7	.404	.240	.680	3.1	.7	.9	.2	4.6	3.2
2004–05	AEK Athens	8	0	11.8	.476	.444	.750	.9	.5	.4	.5	3.4	0.8
2005–06	AEK Athens	11	6	**26.5**	.472	.393	.615	**3.3**	**1.7**	**2.3**	.3	7.9	8.0
2007–08	Real Madrid	**17**	3	11.4	.365	.211	.750	1.5	.5	.9	.2	3.0	2.8
2008–09	Olympiacos	12	4	8.0	.286	.182	.571	1.4	.2	.5	.3	1.5	1.2
2009–10	Maroussi	14	**14**	26.4	**.488**	**.488**	.810	3.0	1.0	1.1	**.6**	**8.3**	**9.3**
2010–11	Olympiacos	6	0	6.2	.083	.000	**1.000**	1.2	.3	.3	—	.7	.8
2011–12†	Olympiacos	11	1	11.6	.314	.263	.800	1.8	.3	.5	.2	2.8	1.8
Career		105	33	17.0	.412	.330	.731	2.2	.6	1.0	.3	4.5	3.8
