= Christos Lakkas =

Greek basketball player

Doukas
- Position: Point guard / shooting guard
- League: Greek B League

Personal information
- Born: December 5, 1991 (age 34) Athens, Greece
- Listed height: 6 ft 2 in (1.88 m)
- Listed weight: 180 lb (82 kg)

Career information
- Playing career: 2009–present

Career history
- 2009–2010: Maroussi
- 2010–2012: Panerythraikos
- 2012–2013: Peristeri
- 2013–2014: Filathlitikos
- 2014–2015: Pagrati
- 2015–2016: Peristeri
- 2016–2017: Karditsa
- 2017–2018: Irakleio
- 2018–present: Doukas

Christos Lakkas (born December 5, 1991) is a Greek professional basketball player. He is a 6-foot-2-inch (1.88 m) tall point guard.

== Professional career ==
During his pro club career, Lakkas played in the Greek Basket League, with the Greek clubs Maroussi and Peristeri.
