= Faros Keratsiniou B.C. =

Faros Keratsiniou
- Nickname: Κυανέρυθροι (Cyan-Reds); Sharks
- Founded: 1971; 54 years ago
- History: Faros Keratsiniou B.C. (1971–present)
- Arena: Pantelis Nikolaidis Indoor Hall
- Capacity: 1,000
- Location: Keratsini, Attica, Greece
- Team colors: Red, Black and Blue
- President: Nikos Petsas
- Website: Official site
Home	Away

Faros Keratsiniou B.C. (alternate spellings: Pharos, Keratsini), or simply, Faros B.C., is a Greek professional basketball club that is based in Keratsini, Attica, Greece. The club's full name is Athlitikos Omilos Faros Keratsiniou, which means Sporting Group Lighthouse Keratsini (Greek: Αθλητικός Όμιλος Φάρος Κερατσινίου), abbreviated as A.O. Faros Keratsiniou. The club's emblem is a lighthouse.

In 2017, the professional team merged with G.S. Larissas Faros, which received the spot of Keratsiniou in the Greek Basket League.

== Logos ==
(The club's lighthouse logo, 1971–2015)

(2015–present)

== History ==
Faros was founded in 1971, by Stefanos Lachanis. The team had its best season to date, in the 2014–15 season, when Faros was promoted to the 2nd-tier level Greek 2nd Division, because of the relegation of Panelefsiniakos to the Greek B League (Greek 3rd-tier level), due to financial problems.

During its first season (2015–16) in the Greek A2 League, Faros had a terrific start to their season, and managed to break the record for the best win/loss start in the league, which was previously set by Dafnis, during the 1998–99 season. That same season, they also managed to make it to the Greek Cup's 2016 Final. Faros became just the third team in history to make it to the Greek Cup Final, while not being a current member of the top-tier level basketball league in Greece, the Greek Basket League, after Panellinios in 1987, and Rethymno Aegean in 2007, previously accomplished the feat.

In order to reach the 2016 Greek Cup Final, Faros first beat Pagrati of the Greek 2nd Division, by a score of 79 to 57. They then beat 5 top-tier Greek First Division clubs in succession: Kolossos Rodou (70–66), Lavrio (76–56), Trikala Aries (82–67), Nea Kifissia (61–59); and in the Greek Cup semifinals, they beat PAOK, of the European 2nd-tier level league, the EuroCup, by a score of 69–65.

In the 2016–17 season, Faros won one of the Greek 2nd Division's league promotions to the top-tier level Greek Basket League. However, in the summer of 2017, Faros merged with G.S. Larissas, which then took the club's place in the upcoming Greek Basket League 2017–18 season. Faros retained all of its amateur and junior clubs.

== Arena ==
The club plays its home games at the Pantelis Nikolaidis Indoor Hall, a small arena with a capacity of about 1,000.

== Season by season ==
Season	Tier	Division	Pos.	Greek Cup	European competitions
2013–14	4	C Basket League	2nd		
2014–15	3	B Basket League	2nd		
2015–16	2	A2 Basket League	2nd (Note: Refused to promote to the Greek Basket League.)	Runners-up	
2016–17	2	A2 Basket League	2nd (Note: Merged with G.S. Larissas Faros, which received its spot in the Basket League.)		
2017–	Lower divisions				

== Honors and titles ==
- Greek Cup
  - Runners-up (1): 2015–16
- Greek Second Division
  - Runners-up (2): 2015–16, 2016–17

== Notable players ==
Note: Flags indicate national team eligibility at FIBA-sanctioned events. Players may hold other non-FIBA nationalities not displayed.

Criteria

To appear in this section a player must have either:

- Set a club record or won an individual award while at the club
- Played at least one official international match for their national team at any time
- Played at least one official NBA match at any time.

- Nikos Angelopoulos
- Marios Batis
- Michalis Kakiouzis
- Vangelis Karampoulas
- Sotiris Katoufas
- Dimitrios Kompodietas
- Nikos Liakopoulos
- Spyros Magkounis
- Ioannis Milonas
- Filippos Moschovitis
- Manos Papamakarios
- Christos Petrodimopoulos
- Gaios Skordilis
- Kostas Kakaroudis
- Fotis Vasilopoulos
- Ioannis Dimakos
