= Tasos Kamateros =

Greek basketball player

No. 21 – Peristeri
- Position: Power forward
- League: Greek Basketball League

Personal information
- Born: May 19, 2000 (age 26) Athens, Greece
- Listed height: 6 ft 8 in (2.03 m)
- Listed weight: 240 lb (109 kg)

Career information
- College: South Dakota (2019–2023); Vanderbilt (2023–2024)
- NBA draft: 2024: undrafted
- Playing career: 2024–present

Career history
- 2024: Proteas Voulas
- 2024–2025: Doxa Lefkadas
- 2025–2026: Lavrio
- 2026–present: Peristeri

Tasos Kamateros (Greek: Τάσος Καματερός; born May 19, 2000) is a Greek professional basketball player for Peristeri of the Greek Basketball League. Standing at 2.03 m (6 ft 8 in) tall, he plays at the power forward position.

== Early life ==
Kamateros was born in Athens, Greece. He played in amateur leagues with Proteas Voulas, before being recruited from South Dakota in 2019.

== College career ==
Kamateros played college basketball with South Dakota Coyotes. Despite being a power forwards, he was regarded as one of the best three point shooters for the Coyotes. During his last season with the Coyotes, he averaged 12.5 points and 6.4 rebounds per game as a starter while shooting 40.1 percent from three.

After three years with South Dakota, he was transferred to Vanderbilt for his final college year.

== Professional career ==
On August 11, 2024, Kamateros signed with AEK Athens of the Greek Basket League. He left the team without appearing in a single game for the team.

On December 14 of the same year, he returned to Proteas Voulas. On February 1, he joined Doxa Lefkadas of the Greek A2 Basket League.

On August 7, he joined Lavrio of the Greek A2 Basket League.

On August 19, 2026, he joined Peristeri of the Greek Basketball League.
