= Giorgos Gkiouzelis =

Greek basketball player

No. 12 – Peristeri
- Position: Power forward
- League: Greek Basketball League

Personal information
- Born: November 23, 1995 (age 30) Serres, Greece
- Listed height: 6 ft 8.5 in (2.04 m)
- Listed weight: 215 lb (98 kg)

Career information
- Playing career: 2014–present

Career history
- 2014–2015: Agia Paraskevi
- 2015–2016: Ionikos Nikaias
- 2016–2017: Peristeri
- 2017–2018: Dafni Dafniou
- 2018–2019: Koroivos Amaliadas
- 2019–2020: Diagoras Dryopideon
- 2020–2021: Iraklis Thessaloniki
- 2021–2022: Ionikos Nikaias
- 2022: Peristeri
- 2022–2023: Karditsa
- 2023–2024: Apollon Patras
- 2024–2026: Aris Thessaloniki
- 2026: Nürnberg Falcons
- 2026–present: Peristeri

Giorgos Gkiouzelis, or Georgios Giouzelis (Greek: Γιώργος Γκιουζέλης or Γεώργιος Γκιουζέλης; born October 13, 1995) is a Greek professional basketball player for Peristeri B.C. of the Greek Basketball League. He is a 2.04 m (6 ft 8 in) tall and 98 kg (216 lb) power forward.

== Professional career ==
Gkiouzelis played with the youth system program of the Greek powerhouse Panathinaikos, before starting his pro career in 2014. From 2012 to 2017, Gkiouzelis played in the lower-level leagues in Greece, before joining Koroivos Amaliadas of the Greek 2nd division. In the following season, he played with Diagoras Dryopideon.

In 2020, Gkiouzelis joined Iraklis, of Greece's top-tier level Greek Basket League. The following season after that, Gkiouzelis moved to the Greek club Ionikos Nikaias. In 23 domestic Greek league games, he averaged 5 points and 3.3 rebounds, while playing around 18 minutes per contest.

On July 10, 2022, Gkiouzelis returned to Peristeri, signing a two-year contract. However, he appeared in only 4 domestic league games, in which he had limited playing time. He subsequently moved to Karditsa for the rest of the season. In 14 domestic Greek league games with Karditsa, Gkiouzelis averaged 5.1 points and 2.8 rebounds in 20 minutes per contest.

On June 25, 2023, Gkiouzelis signed with Apollon Patras. In 27 games, he averaged 4.4 points and 2.3 rebounds in 22 minutes of play.

On June 23, 2024, Gkiouzelis moved to Aris. On August 7, 2025, he renewed his contract for another two seasons. In February 2026 he switched teams to the German basketball club Nürnberg Falcons BC.

On August 10, 2026, he returned to Peristeri for a third stint.
