= Peristeri B.C. in international competitions =

Peristeri B.C. in international competitions is the history and statistics of Peristeri Athens in FIBA Europe and EuroLeague Basketball Company European-wide professional club basketball competitions.

== European competitions ==
Record	Round	Opponent club			
1991–92 FIBA Korać Cup 3rd–tier
4–5 +1 draw	1st round	(Austria) Toshiba Klosterneuburg	98–82 (a)	104–78 (h)	
4–5 +1 draw	2nd round	(Socialist Federal Republic of Yugoslavia) Bosna	84–84 (a)	85–81 (h)	
4–5 +1 draw	Top 16	(Spain) Taugrés	84–87 (h)	82–89 (a)	
4–5 +1 draw	Top 16	(Croatia) Zadar	83–89 (h)	92–118 (a)	
4–5 +1 draw	Top 16	(Italy) Benetton Treviso	66–103 (a)	93–72 (h)	
1992–93 FIBA Korać Cup 3rd–tier
6–4	2nd round	(Cyprus) APOEL	98–93 (a)	116–83 (h)	
6–4	3rd round	(Ukraine) Stroitel Kharkov	121–99 (a)	131–61 (h)	
6–4	Top 16	(Italy) Philips Milano	78–90 (h)	78–89 (a)	
6–4	Top 16	(France) Gravelines	87–78 (h)	73–78 (a)	
6–4	Top 16	(Spain) Elosúa León	64–100 (a)	84–75 (h)	
1993–94 FIBA Korać Cup 3rd–tier
6–6	2nd round	(Belgium) Spirou	80–82 (a)	88–77 (h)	
6–6	3rd round	(France) Racing Paris	95–85 (a)	98–83 (h)	
6–6	Top 16	(Italy) Pfizer Reggio Calabria	78–79 (a)	82–70 (h)	
6–6	Top 16	(Spain) Estudiantes Caja Postal	98–72 (a)	86–75 (h)	
6–6	Top 16	(Israel) Maccabi Tel Aviv	60–70 (h)	83–103 (a)	
6–6	QF	(Italy) Stefanel Trieste	80–88 (h)	85–109 (a)	
1994–95 FIBA Korać Cup 3rd–tier
5–5	2nd round	(Hungary) Szolnoki Olaj	92–85 (a)	74–55 (h)	
5–5	3rd round	(Russia) CSK VVS Samara	91–103 (a)	94–72 (h)	
5–5	Top 16	(Israel) Hapoel Eilat	87–82 (a)	76–88 (h)	
5–5	Top 16	(Italy) Stefanel Milano	91–90 (h)	52–98 (a)	
5–5	Top 16	(Spain) Cáceres	70–71 (a)	86–91 (h)	
1996–97 FIBA Korać Cup 3rd–tier
9–3	1st round	Bye	Peristeri qualified without games		
9–3	2nd round	(Germany) Gießen 46ers	82–63 (h)	87–70 (a)	
9–3	2nd round	(Federal Republic of Yugoslavia) Iva Zorka Pharma Šabac	84–67 (h)	91–68 (a)	
9–3	2nd round	(Finland) Namika Lahti	88–50 (a)	101–70 (h)	
9–3	3rd round	(Italy) Cagiva Varese	72–78 (a)	92–81 (h)	
9–3	Top 16	(Spain) Taugrés	70–83 (a)	66–51 (h)	
9–3	QF	(Greece) Aris	65–75 (a)	71–64 (h)	
1997–98 FIBA Korać Cup 3rd–tier
7–5	1st round	Bye	Peristeri qualified without games		
7–5	2nd round	(Israel) Bnei Herzliya	82–62 (h)	87–70 (a)	
7–5	2nd round	(Austria) Mountain Kapfenberg	88–74 (a)	91–53 (h)	
7–5	2nd round	(Federal Republic of Yugoslavia) Crvena zvezda	60–82 (h)	83–77 (a)	
7–5	3rd round	(Spain) León Caja España	78–69 (h)	67–68 (a)	
7–5	Top 16	(Federal Republic of Yugoslavia) Budućnost	76–57 (h)	60–78 (a)	
7–5	QF	(Italy) Mash Verona	72–68 (h)	79–90 (a)	
1999–00 FIBA Korać Cup 3rd–tier
6–4	1st round	Bye	Peristeri qualified without games		
6–4	2nd round	(Germany) Herzogtel Trier	85–51 (h)	91–73 (a)	
6–4	2nd round	(Turkey) Türk Telekom	80–81 (a)	64–53 (h)	
6–4	2nd round	(Bosnia and Herzegovina) Brotnjo	77–68 (h)	84–85 (a)	
6–4	3rd round	(Greece) Near East	80–73 (a)	66–63 (h)	
6–4	Top 16	(Spain) Adecco Estudiantes	75–85 (h)	71–79 (a)	
2000–01 EuroLeague 1st–tier
7–5	Regular season	(Spain) Adecco Estudiantes	91–86 (a)	91–81 (h)	
7–5	Regular season	(Switzerland) Lugano Snakes	85–68 (h)	91–80 (a)	
7–5	Regular season	(Lithuania) Žalgiris	74–92 (h)	73–86 (a)	
7–5	Regular season	(Croatia) Zadar	92–79 (a)	92–73 (h)	
7–5	Regular season	(Italy) Paf Wennington Bologna	83–70 (h)	69–71 (a)	
7–5	Top 16	(Spain) TAU Cerámica	79–81 (h)	68–81 (a)	– (h)
2001–02 EuroLeague 1st–tier
3–11	Regular season	(Slovenia) Union Olimpija	74–81 (a)	67–75 (h)	
3–11	Regular season	(Germany) Opel Skyliners	89–93 (h)	55–72 (a)	
3–11	Regular season	(Spain) FC Barcelona	77–73 (a)	72–101 (h)	
3–11	Regular season	(Italy) Kinder Bologna	59–87 (h)	72–87 (a)	
3–11	Regular season	(United Kingdom) London Towers	99–75 (h)	87–75 (a)	
3–11	Regular season	(Lithuania) Žalgiris	78–81 (a)	62–70 (h)	
3–11	Regular season	(Turkey) Ülker	82–95 (h)	79–93 (a)	
2002–03 FIBA Europe Champions Cup 3rd–tier
9–3	Regular season	(Israel) Hapoel Migdal	92–84 (h)	80–88 (a)	
9–3	Regular season	(Serbia and Montenegro) NIS Vojvodina	77–65 (a)	101–76 (h)	
9–3	Regular season	(Bulgaria) Yambolgaz-92	72–66 (a)	93–68 (h)	
9–3	Regular season	(Turkey) Pinar Karşıyaka	80–68 (h)	91–74 (a)	
9–3	Regular season	(North Macedonia) Feršped Rabotnički	72–59 (a)	85–72 (h)	
9–3	Final stage	(Greece) Aris	84–86; January 17, Armeets Arena, Sofia		
9–3	Final stage	(Turkey) Türk Telekom	70–86; January 19, Armeets Arena, Sofia		
2003–04 FIBA Europe League 3rd–tier
5–7	Regular season	(Serbia and Montenegro) Hemofarm	66–78 (h)	68–82 (a)	
5–7	Regular season	(Belgium) Dexia Mons-Hainaut	71–66 (a)	93–82 (h)	
5–7	Regular season	(Russia) Khimki	79–77 (h)	79–90 (a)	
5–7	Regular season	(Cyprus) EKA AEL	73–69 (h)	57–63 (a)	
5–7	Regular season	(France) Racing Paris	80–82 (a)	99–108 (h)	
5–7	Regular season	(Poland) Anwil Włocławek	74–71 (a)	75–80 (h)	

== Record ==
From the 1991–92 season, to the 2003–04 season, Peristeri Athens had an overall win/loss record of: 67 wins and 58 losses, plus 1 tie, in a total of 126 games played in all of their European-wide professional club basketball competitions.

- (1st–tier) EuroLeague: 10–16 in 26 games.
- (3rd–tier) FIBA Korać Cup: 43–32, plus 1 tie, in 76 games.
- (3rd–tier) FIBA Europe League: 5–7 in 12 games.
- (3rd–tier) FIBA Europe Champions Cup: 9–3 in 12 games.

== See also ==
- Greek basketball clubs in international competitions
