= Dimitrios Katiakos =

Greek basketball player

Dimitrios Katiakos Δημήτρης Κατιάκος
Personal information
- Born: March 10, 1987 (age 39) Cholargos, Greece
- Listed height: 6 ft 8.75 in (2.05 m)
- Listed weight: 211 lb (96 kg)

Career information
- Playing career: 2003–2018
- Position: Power forward / center

Career history
- 2003–2006: Esperos Kallitheas
- 2007–2008: Panionios
- 2008–2009: Panerythraikos
- 2009–2010: Ikaros Kallitheas-Esperos
- 2010–2011: Arkadikos
- 2011–2012: OFI
- 2012–2013: Esperos Patras
- 2013–2014: Aetos
- 2014–2015: Promitheas Patras
- 2015–2017: Peristeri
- 2017–2018: Diagoras Dryopideon

Career highlights
- Greek 2nd Division champion (2010)

Dimitrios Katiakos (alternate spelling: Dimitris) (born March 10, 1987, in Cholargos, Attica, Greece) is a Greek former professional basketball player. At a height of 2.05 m (6 ft 8 3/4 in) tall, he played at the power forward and center positions.

== Professional career ==
At the club level, some of the teams that Katiakos played with included: Esperos Kallitheas, Panionios, Ikaros Kallitheas-Esperos, Arkadikos, Promitheas Patras, and Peristeri.

== National team career ==
Katiakos also played with Greece's junior national teams at the FIBA Europe Under-18 Championship, and at the FIBA Europe Under-20 Championship.
