= Gaios Skordilis =

Greek basketball player

Gaios Skordilis Γάιος Σκορδίλης
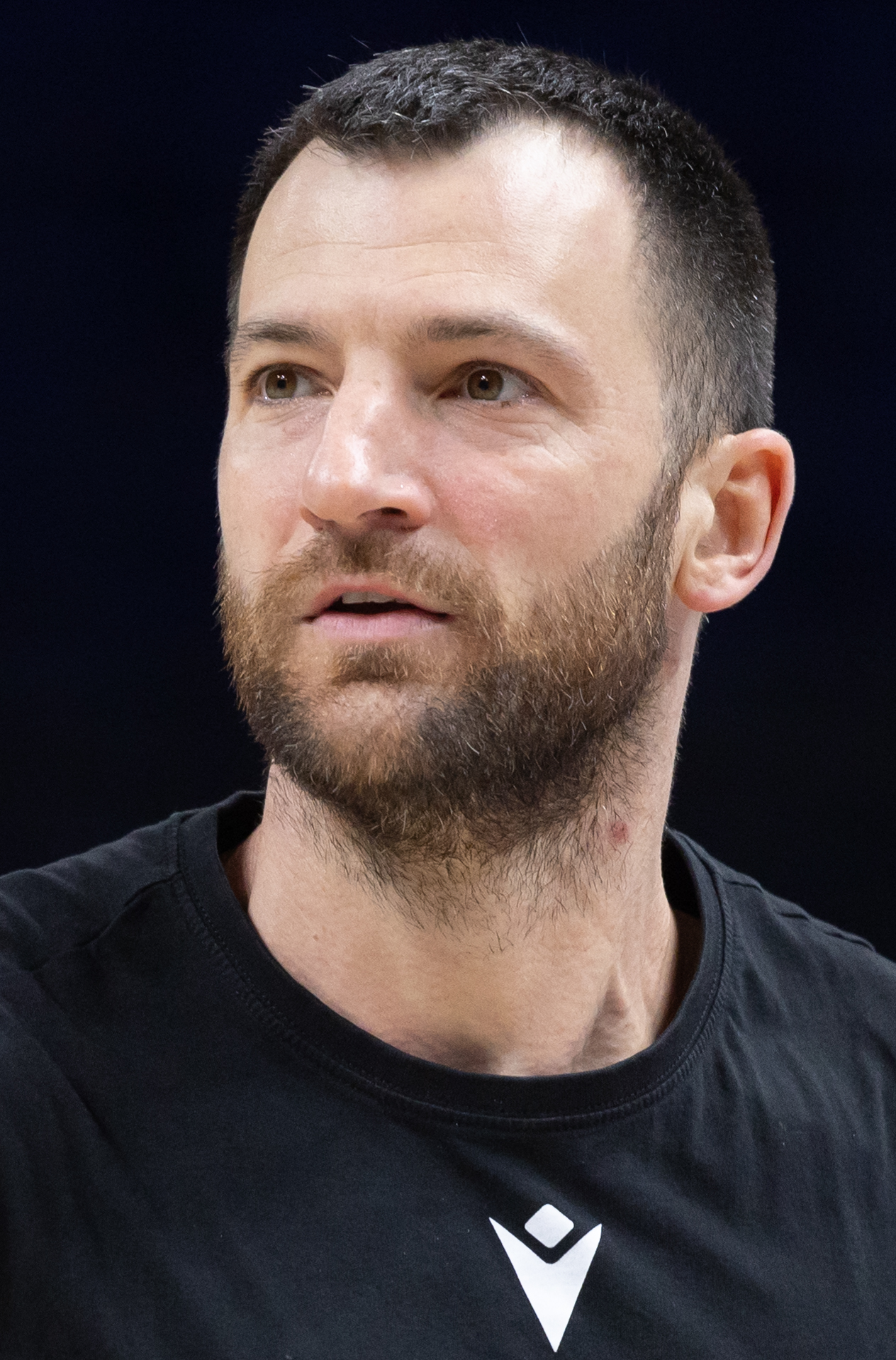
- Skordilis in 2026

No. 1 – AEK Athens
- Position: Center
- League: Greek Basketball League

Personal information
- Born: December 6, 1987 (age 38) Corfu, Greece
- Listed height: 6 ft 10 in (2.08 m)
- Listed weight: 275 lb (125 kg)

Career information
- Playing career: 2006–present

Career history
- 2006–2011: Aris Thessaloniki
- 2011–2012: Ikaros Kallitheas
- 2012–2013: Panathinaikos
- 2013–2014: Panionios
- 2014–2015: Apollon Patras
- 2015–2017: Faros Keratsiniou
- 2017–2021: Peristeri
- 2021–2022: Iraklis Thessaloniki
- 2022: Montreal Alliance
- 2022–2023: Grindvík
- 2023: Apollon Patras
- 2023–2024: Milon
- 2024–present: AEK Athens

Career highlights
- Greek League champion (2013); Greek Cup winner (2013); Greek Cup Finals Top Scorer (2016); 2× Greek A2 Elite League champion (2018, 2024)
Medals
Men's basketball
Representing Greece
Mediterranean Games
Silver medal – second place	2009 Pescara	Under-26

Gaios "Guy" Skordilis (Greek: Γάιος "Γκάι" Σκορδίλης; born December 6, 1987) is a Greek professional basketball player for AEK of the Greek Basketball League. He is a 2.08 m (6 ft 10 in) tall 125 kg (276 lb) center.

== Professional career ==
After playing with the youth teams of Faiakes Corfu and Iraklis, Skordilis began his professional career in 2006 with the Greek League club Aris Thessaloniki. In 2011, he moved to the Greek League club Ikaros Kallitheas. In 2012, he moved to the six-time EuroLeague champions, Panathinaikos.

He joined Panionios in 2013, and he moved to Apollon Patras in 2014. In 2015, Skordilis signed a 2-year contract with the emerging powerhouse Faros Keratsiniou of the Greek A2 League.

Skordilis moved to Peristeri in 2017. On July 14, 2019, he renewed his contract with the club through 2021. After temporarily deciding to split ways, Skordilis and the Athenian club renewed their contract on July 8, 2020. On July 30, 2021, he officially parted ways with the club after four seasons.

On August 17, 2021, Skordilis signed with Iraklis. In 16 games, he averaged 7.2 points and 5.5 rebounds in under 18 minutes per contest. He left the team just before the end of the season and moved to the Canadian club Montreal Alliance. On June 14, 2022, Skordilis returned to Greece ahead of the birth of his child.

In August 2022, Skordilis signed with Úrvalsdeild karla club Grindvík. In 19 league games, he averaged 13.7 points and 8 rebounds for Grindavík and finished in 7th place. In the last game of Grindavík's first-round playoff loss against Njarðvík, Skordilis was disqualified from the game and received a three-game suspension from the Icelandic Basketball Association as a result.

On August 6, 2023, Skordilis returned to Greece, signing with Apollon Patras. On December 14 of the same year, he parted ways with Apollon and moved to Milon.

On August 14, 2024, he joined AEK. On July 17, 2025, Skordilis extended his contract with the club until 2027.

== National team career ==
With the junior national team of Greece, Skordilis played at the 2005 FIBA Europe Under-18 Championship. He also won the silver medal at the 2009 Mediterranean Games while playing for the Greek under-26 national team.

== Awards and accomplishments ==
- Greek Cup Winner: (2013)
- Greek League Champion: (2013)
