= Antonis Mantzaris =

Greek basketball player and coach

Antonis Mantzaris Αντώνης Μάντζαρης
No. 10 – Amilla Peristeriou
- Position: Shooting guard / small forward
- League: A ESKA

Personal information
- Born: 20 June 1986 (age 40) Athens, Greece
- Listed height: 6 ft 4 in (1.93 m)
- Listed weight: 220 lb (100 kg)

Career information
- Playing career: 2004–present
- Coaching career: 2015–present

Career history

Playing
- 2004–2011: Peristeri
- 2011–2012: AEK Athens
- 2012–2013: Peristeri
- 2013–2014: Panelefsiniakos
- 2014–2015: Psychiko
- 2015–2016: Ethnikos Piraeus
- 2016–2018: Peristeri
- 2018: Maroussi
- 2018-2020: Psychiko
- 2020-2022: Triton Sepolia
- 2022-2023: Panionios
- 2023: Psychiko
- 2024-Present: Amilla Peristeriou

Coaching
- 2005–2006: Amilla Peristeriou
- 2015–2020: Esperos
- 2022–: Amilla Peristeriou (academies)
- 2024: Porfyras
- 2024–: Esperos

Career highlights
- 2x Greek 2nd Division champion (2008-2009, 2017-2018)

Antonis Mantzaris (alternate spelling: Antonios) (Greek: Αντώνης Μάντζαρης; born 20 June 1986) is a Greek professional basketball player and coach. He is 1.93 m (6 ft 4 in) tall. He can play at the shooting guard and small forward positions.

== Professional career ==
Mantzaris begin his pro career with the Greek Basket League club Peristeri in 2004. He moved to AEK Athens in 2011.

== National team career ==
As a member of the Greek junior national teams, Mantzaris played at the 2004 FIBA Europe Under-18 Championship and at the 2006 FIBA Europe Under-20 Championship.

== Personal life ==
Mantzaris' brother, Vangelis Mantzaris, is also a professional basketball player.
