= 2015–16 Greek A2 Basket League =

- League: Greek A2 Basket League
- Sport: Basketball
- Teams: 16
- Season champions: Kymis

Greek A2 Basket League seasons
- ← 2014–15 2016–17 →

The 2015–16 Greek A2 Basket League was the 30th season of the Greek A2 Basket League, the second-tier level professional club basketball league in Greece. This season was the first season with the participation of 16 teams. It was also the first season where playoff and play out games were held. The winner was Kymis, which got promoted directly to GBL (A1). The second place team was Faros Keratsiniou, but the club didn't accept to play in the top-tier GBL, and it was replaced by the third placed team, Promitheas Patras. In contrast, Evropi Pefkochoriou and Filippos Veroias were relegated to Greek B League (Beta Ethniki) directly, and Peristeri and Panerythraikos were relegated after play out games.

== Teams ==
Location of teams in Greek A2 Basket League 2015–16

Club	Home city
Doukas	Marousi, Athens
Doxa Lefkadas	Lefkada
Ethnikos Piraeus	Piraeus, Athens
Evropi Pefkochoriou	Pefkochori
Faros Keratsiniou	Keratsini, Piraeus, Athens
Filippos Veroias	Veria
Iraklis Thessaloniki	Thessaloniki
Kymis	Kymi
Livadeia	Livadeia
Machites Doxas Pefkon	Pefka, Thessaloniki
OFI	Heraklion
Pagrati	Pangrati, Athens
Panerythraikos	Erythraia, Athens
Peristeri	Peristeri, Athens
Promitheas Patras	Patras
Psychiko	Psychiko, Athens

== Standings ==
Pos	Club	Pts	Pld	W	L	PF	PA	Diff	Qualification or Relegation
1.	Kymis	51	28	23	5	2159	1980	179	Promoted to Greek Basket League
2.	Faros Keratsiniou	50	28	22	6	2252	1876	376	Playoff
3.	Ethnikos Piraeus	47	28	19	9	2197	2064	133	Playoff
4.	Promitheas Patras	47	28	19	9	2159	2041	118	Playoff
5.	Pagrati	44	28	16	12	2164	2194	-30	Playoff
6.	Doxa Lefkadas	44	28	16	12	2112	2053	59	
7.	Doukas	43	28	15	13	2196	2150	46	
8.	Psychiko	42	28	14	14	2091	2082	9	
9.	Iraklis Thessaloniki	40	28	12	16	1985	2065	-80	
10.	Livadeia	40	28	12	16	2128	2203	-75	Play Out
11.	Machites Doxas Pefkon	39	28	11	17	1885	1979	-94	Play Out
12.	Panerythraikos	38	28	10	18	2156	2219	-63	Play Out
13.	Peristeri	38	28	10	18	1966	2014	-48	Play Out
14.	Evropi Pefkochoriou	34	28	6	22	2162	2382	-220	Relegated to Beta Ethniki
15.	Filippos Veroias	32	28	5	22	1864	2174	-310	Relegated to Beta Ethniki
16.	OFI (Note: OFI withdrew from the league.)	0	0	0	0	0	0	0	Relegated to Beta Ethniki

Source: Hellenic Basketball Federation

== Playoffs ==
Semifinals
2	Faros Keratsiniou	3
5	Pagrati	0
3	Ethnikos	2
4	Promitheas Patras	3

Finals
2	Faros Keratsiniou	3
4	Promitheas Patras	2

== Play-out ==
- Livadeia – Peristeri 3-0
- Machites Doxas Pefkon – Panerythraikos 3-2

Source: Hellenic Basketball Federation

== Final league standings ==
Position	Team	Qualification or Relegation
1.	Kymis	Promotion to Greek Basket League
2.	Faros Keratsiniou (Note: Faros refused to promote to GBL.)	
3.	Promitheas Patras	Promotion to Greek Basket League
4.	Ethnikos Piraeus	
5.	Pagrati	
6.	Doxa Lefkadas	Promotion to Greek Basket League
7.	Doukas	
8.	Psychiko	
9.	Iraklis Thessaloniki	
10.	Livadeia	
11.	Machites Doxas Pefkon	
12.	Panerythraikos	Relegation to Greek B League (Beta Ethniki)
13.	Peristeri	Relegation to Greek B League (Beta Ethniki)
14.	Evropi Pefkochoriou	Relegation to Greek B League (Beta Ethniki)
15.	Filippos Veroias	Relegation to Greek B League (Beta Ethniki)
16.	OFI	Relegation to Greek B League (Beta Ethniki)

== See also ==
- 2015–16 Greek Basketball Cup
- 2015–16 Greek Basket League (1st tier)
