= Filippos Moschovitis =

Greek basketball player

Filippos Moschovitis Φίλιππος Μοσχοβίτης
Nea Kifissia
- Position: Point guard
- League: Greek B League

Personal information
- Born: November 26, 1979 (age 46) Athens, Greece
- Listed height: 6 ft 3 in (1.91 m)
- Listed weight: 180 lb (82 kg)

Career information
- Playing career: 1996–present

Career history
- 1996–1998: Sporting
- 1998–2000: Panellinios
- 2000–2003: Dafni
- 2003–2004: Apollon Patras
- 2004–2005: Ionikos
- 2005–2006: Ment
- 2006–2007: Kollosos
- 2007–2009: Peristeri
- 2009–2010: Pagrati
- 2010–2011: Near East
- 2011–2013: Kifissia
- 2013–2014: Psychiko
- 2014–2015: Faros
- 2015–2016: Psychiko
- 2016–present: Kifissia

Career highlights
- 2× Greek 2nd Division champion (2009, 2013)

Fillipos Moschovitis (Greek: Φίλιππος Μοσχοβίτης; born November 26, 1978) is a Greek professional basketball player for Nea Kifissia. He is a 1.90 m (6 ft 3 in) tall

== Youth career ==
Moschovitis started his career at the youth clubs of Sporting. He was quickly promoted to the senior team, where he stayed for 2 more years.

== Professional career ==
Moschovitis played in several historical Greek teams during his career, including: Peristeri, Panellinios, and Apollon Patras.
