= Spyros Magkounis =

Greek basketball player

Spyros Magkounis Σπύρος Μαγκουνής
EFAO Zografou
- Position: Small forward
- League: Greek 3rd Division

Personal information
- Born: December 10, 1985 (age 40) Maroussi, Athens, Greece
- Listed height: 6 ft 7.5 in (2.02 m)
- Listed weight: 225 lb (102 kg)

Career information
- Playing career: 2003–present

Career history
- 2003–2007: AEK Athens
- 2007–2009: Aigaleo
- 2009–2011: Rethymno
- 2011–2013: Panelefsiniakos
- 2013: Basket Barcellona
- 2013–2014: Panelefsiniakos
- 2014–2015: Faros Keratsiniou
- 2015–2016: Ethnikos Piraeus
- 2016–2018: Peristeri
- 2018–2019: ASK Karditsas
- 2019–2020: Esperos Kallitheas
- 2020–present: EFAO Zografou

Career highlights
- 2× Greek 2nd Division champion (2012, 2018)

Spyridon "Spyros" Magkounis (alternate spellings: Spiridon, Spiros, Magounis) (Greek: Σπυρίδων "Σπύρος" Μαγκουνής; born December 10, 1985, in Greece) is a Greek professional basketball player. He is a 2.02 m (6 ft 8 in) tall small forward.

== Professional career ==
Some of the clubs that Magkounis has played at the pro club level with include: AEK Athens, Aigaleo, Rethymno, and Elefsina.

== National team career ==
Magkounis was a member of the junior national teams of Greece. He played at the 2001 FIBA Europe Under-16 Championship and the 2005 FIBA Europe Under-20 Championship.
