= Georgios Makaras =

Greek basketball player

Personal information
- Born: June 30, 1966 (age 60) Serres, Greece
- Listed height: 6 ft 6 in (1.98 m)
- Listed weight: 220 lb (100 kg)

Career information
- Playing career: 1984–1997
- Position: Shooting guard / small forward

Career history
- 1984–1986: Thyella Serron
- 1986–1992: PAOK
- 1992–1997: Peristeri

Career highlights
- As player: FIBA European Cup Winners' Cup champion (1991); Greek League champion (1992); Greek League All-Star (1994 I)

Georgios Makaras (alternate spelling: Giorgos) (Greek: Γιώργος Μακαράς; born June 30, 1966) is a former Greek professional basketball player. During his playing career, at a height of 1.98 m (6 ft 6 in) tall, he played at the shooting guard and small forward positions.

== Professional career ==
Makaras started playing youth club basketball with his local hometown team, Thyella Serron, in 1979. After the 1984–85 season, Thyella was promoted up to Greece's top-tier level Greek Basket League. Makaras was one of the headliners of the 1984–85 Thyella team that earned that league promotion. Makaras then played in the top-level Greek Basket League, for the first time, in the 1985–86 season.

After Theylla Serron was relegated back down to the Greek 2nd Division after the 1985–86 season, Makaras transferred to the Greek 1st Division club PAOK Thessaloniki, for the 1986–87 season. Makaras played with PAOK for six seasons. While he was a member of PAOK, he won the 1991 FIBA European Cup Winners' Cup (Saporta Cup) championship. In the 1991 FIBA European Cup's Final, Makaras failed to score, but he grabbed four rebounds, and played a physical game to help contribute to his team's win. With PAOK, he also won the Greek League championship in 1992, and played in three Greek Cup Finals.

In 1992, he was released by PAOK, and he moved to the Greek club Peristeri Athens. After playing five years with the Athenian club, he announced his retirement from playing pro club basketball in 1997, at the age of 31.

== National team career ==
Makaras was a member of the junior national teams of Greece. He also had 15 caps with the senior Greek national team, in which he scored a total of 103 points. With Greece's senior national team, played at the 1988 FIBA World Olympic Qualifying Tournament.
