= Peristeri B.C. =

Peristeri Betsson
- Nickname: Πρίγκιπες της Δυτικής Όχθης (Princes of the West Bank); Κυανοκίτρινοι (Blue-yellows)
- Leagues: Greek Basketball League; Champions League
- Founded: 22 October 1971; 55 years ago
- Stadium: Peristeri Indoor Hall Andreas Papandreou
- Capacity: 3.000
- Location: Peristeri, Greece
- Main sponsor: Betsson
- President: Panos Vasilaras
- Head coach: Vasilis Xanthopoulos
- Championships: 3 Greek A2 League; 3 Greek B League; 1 Greek 3rd Division; 1 Greek 2nd Tier ESKA Cup
- Retired numbers: 2 (10, 13)
- Website: peristeribc.gr

Peristeri Betsson B.C. (Greek: K.A.E. Περιστέρι) is a professional basketball club located in Peristeri, Greece, which is both a city and a suburb in the western part of the Athens agglomeration. The club's full name is Gymnastikos Syllogos Peristeriou K.A.E. (Γυμναστικός Σύλλογος Περιστερίου K.A.E.). It is a part of the G.S. Peristeri (Γ.Σ. Περιστερίου) multi-sports club and, since 2025, competes as Peristeri Betsson BC thanks to its sponsorship by the online sportsbook Betsson. The club was founded on October 22, 1971.

The club's emblem is the dove symbol, and the club's team colors are yellow and blue. For the 2025–26 season, the team competes in the Greek Basketball League, which is the top-tier level league in Greece, as well as in the top-level competition organised by FIBA Europe, the Basketball Champions League.

== History ==
=== Early years and rise of the club ===
The club began play in the 1971–72 season. In the 1977–78 season, Peristeri won the third level championship of Greek pro basketball, under head coach Faidon Matthaiou. In the 1982–83 season, under head coach Thanasis Christoforou, Peristeri won the second level championship of Greek pro basketball, which was at that time, the Greek B League. In the following 1983–84 season, Peristeri played games for the first time, in the top-tier level Greek Basket League. Peristeri won the Greek 2nd Division championship again, in the 1988–89 season.

In the subsequent years, the team was very successful, and many well-known basketball players played for the club. During this era, Peristeri competed in the European 3rd-tier level FIBA Korać Cup seven times (in the seasons 1991–92, 1992–93, 1993–94, 1994–95, 1996–97, 1997–98, and 1999–00). Well-known players such as: Audie Norris, Marko Jarić, Milan Gurović, Angelos Koronios, Michalis Pelekanos, Kostas Tsartsaris, Alphonso Ford, Benoit Benjamin, Gary Leonard, Randy White, Marlon Maxey, and Conner Henry played for the club in that era.

In the 2000–01 season, led by the great scorer Ford, Peristeri finished in second place in the top-tier Greek League, in the regular season. The club also competed in the European-wide top-tier level EuroLeague competition, during the 2000–01 and 2001–02 seasons. In the 2002–03 season, Peristeri competed in the European third-tier level FIBA Europe Champions Cup. In the 2003–04 season, the club played in the European 3rd-tier level FIBA Europe League.

=== Decline of the club ===
Following the 2003–04 Greek Basket League season, Peristeri was downgraded to the second division Greek A2 League for the 2004–05 season, due to great financial troubles within the Peristeri Sports Club. The club also competed in the Greek 2nd Division in the 2005–06 season. The club was then relegated down to the Greek 3rd Division, for the 2006–07 season. After winning the Greek 3rd Division championship, in the 2006–07 season, Peristeri returned to the Greek 2nd Division, for the 2007–08 season. Peristeri then won the Greek 2nd Division championship, in the 2008–09 season.

Peristeri then competed in the top-tier level Greek 1st Division, in the 2009–10, 2010–11, 2011–12, and 2012–13 seasons. After the 2012–13 Greek Basket League season, Peristeri was again relegated down to the second-tier level Greek A2 League. However, due to economic issues, the club did not take part in the A2 League in the following season, and instead competed in the third-tier level Greek B League, during the 2013–14 season.

Peristeri managed to win the 2014–15 edition of the Greek 2nd-tier level ESKA Cup competition. While in that same 2014–15 season, Peristeri finished in fourth place, in the First Group of the third-tier level Greek B League, and thus did not earn a direct league promotion. Nevertheless, due to the withdrawal of Panionios Athens from the second-tier level Greek A2 League, Peristeri was then promoted back up to the A2 League, as they replaced Panionios in the competition, for the 2015–16 season. However, following that season, the club was relegated back down to the Greek 3rd Division, for the 2016–17 season.

=== Return to European-wide competitions ===
Peristeri won the Greek 3rd Division in the 2016–17 season. Then, in the following 2017–18 season, Peristeri won its third Greek 2nd Division championship. The team broke the league's win–loss record during that season, and finished with an overall record of 29 wins and just 1 loss. Thus, the club was promoted up to the top-tier level Greek Basket League, for the 2018–19 season. The return arrival of head coach Argyris Pedoulakis proved to be a key factor for the team. With Pedoulakis coaching, and with a core of quality players, Peristeri finished second in the regular season, and in fourth place overall at the end of the league's playoffs, which thus secured the team's return to European-wide competitions.

The club then joined one of the two European-wide secondary leagues, the FIBA Basketball Champions League (BCL), for the 2019–20 season. The team had a successful BCL season, as they managed to progress to the round of 16 of the FIBA Champions League, where they were ultimately eliminated by the Israeli Super League club Hapoel Jerusalem. Peristeri finished in the third position of the 2019–20 Greek Basket League season, although the Greek League season ended prematurely, in March 2020, due to the COVID-19 pandemic in Greece.

Peristeri were the finalists of the 2020 edition of the Greek Super Cup competition, after they defeated the Greek EuroLeague giants Panathinaikos Athens, by a score of 90–82 in the semifinals. They lost to Promitheas Patras, by a score of 82–74 in the finals. Peristeri's 2020–21 Greek Basket League season wasn't as successful as the previous one, as they finished in sixth place in the league. In European-wide play, they also competed in the 2020–21 FIBA Champions League season. During that season, the team used three different head coaches. The team also struggled to develop proper player chemistry throughout the duration of the season. Ultimately, Peristeri was unable to match their high points of the previous two seasons.

Under head coach Milan Tomić, Peristeri finished the 2021–22 Greek Basket League season in 8th place. While in Pan-European competition, they competed in the European-wide fourth-tier level FIBA Europe Cup competition's 2021–22 season. In August 2022, the team was given the new sponsorship name of Peristeri B.C. Athens Bwin, after the club secured a naming rights deal with Bwin, for the purposes of increasing the team's budget, as part of an overall effort by the club to position itself in a higher echelon within the Greek Basket League.

=== An international legend becomes the head coach ===
Peristeri hired international basketball legend Vassilis Spanoulis to its head coaching position, for the 2022–23 season. Spanoulis guided the team to its first ever appearance in the Final of the Greek Cup competition. However, they were defeated in the 2022–23 Greek Cup final by the EuroLeague giants Olympiacos Piraeus. In the 2022–23 Greek Basket League season, Peristeri finished in third place in the league, after they beat the Greek Fiba Champions League club PAOK Thessaloniki, in the league's third-place series. During the season, Peristeri managed to beat the EuroLeague giants Panathinaikos Athens, three different times during the overall season. In European-wide play, Peristeri also competed in the 2022–23 FIBA Champions League season, where they were eliminated in the play-ins by the French Pro A League club JDA Dijon, 2–1 in a three game series.

In the 2023–24 FIBA Champions League season, Peristeri had an astonishing year and for the first time in team's history, the team reached the 2024 FIBA Champions League Final Four. In the semifinals, Peristeri was knocked out of the Final Four tournament, after a 97–94 defeat to the Spanish ACB League club Tenerife. Ultimately, Peristeri finished in fourth place in the FIBA Champions League season, after they lost the bronze medal game against the Spanish ACB League club UCAM Murcia, by a score of 87–84. Spanoulis was ultimately named the FIBA Champions League's Best Coach of the Season.

In Greek national domestic competitions, Peristeri made it to the semifinals of the 2023 Greek Super Cup competition, where they lost to Olympiacos Piraeus. They took the 3rd place by beating PAOK. Peristeri also made it to the quarterfinals of the 2023–24 Greek Cup competition, where they again lost to Olympiacos. In the 2023–24 Greek Basket League season, Peristeri once again finished in third place in the league, after they beat the Greek EuroCup club Aris Thessaloniki, in the league's single third-place match. In 2025, Betsson was announced as the team's naming partner and major sponsor leading the team to be officially renamed as Peristeri Betsson BC.

== Logos ==
(The official logo of Peristeri's parent club.)

(The official alternate logo of Peristeri's parent club.)

(Peristeri B.C.'s official dove symbol.)

(Peristeri B.C.'s official basketball club logo.)

== In international competitions ==
From the 1991–92 season, to the 2003–04 season, Peristeri Athens had an overall win/loss record of: 67 wins and 58 losses, plus 1 tie, in a total of 126 games played in all of their European-wide professional club basketball competitions.

== Arenas ==
Peristeri plays its home games at the Peristeri Indoor Hall Andreas Papandreou, which has a seating capacity of 3,000 people, after the latest reconstruction of the stadium.The club played his home games at the Peristeri Olympic Boxing Hallduring the 2014-2015 season, as a result of the significant damages that the Peristeri Indoor Hall Andreas Papandreou suffered due to flooding.

== Roster ==
Note: Flags indicate national team eligibility at FIBA-sanctioned events. Players may hold other non-FIBA nationalities not displayed.

Peristeri B.C. roster
Players
Coaches

Pos.	No.	Nat.	Name	Ht.	Wt.	Age
SG	0	(United States)	Nichols, Ty	1.91 m (6 ft 3 in)	85 kg (187 lb)	30 – 13 October 1996
PG	1	(United States)	Finch, Jalen	1.85 m (6 ft 1 in)	75 kg (165 lb)	27 – 25 January 1999
F/C	3	(United States) (Greece)	Petrakis, Joe	2.11 m (6 ft 11 in)	91 kg (201 lb)	25 – 28 March 2001
C	4	(United States)	Payne, Omar	2.08 m (6 ft 10 in)	109 kg (240 lb)	26 – 2 November 2000
G	5	(United States) (Greece)	Ittounas, John	1.91 m (6 ft 3 in)	91 kg (201 lb)	24 – 2 September 2002
PG	6	(Greece)	Asonitis, Vangelis	1.93 m (6 ft 4 in)		17 – 29 May 2009
PG	9	(Greece)	Tziallas, Nikos	1.89 m (6 ft 2 in)		19 – 2 November 2007
PF	12	(Greece)	Gkiouzelis, Giorgos	2.04 m (6 ft 8 in)	98 kg (216 lb)	30 – 23 November 1995
G	15	(United States)	Freidel, Noah	1.93 m (6 ft 4 in)	95 kg (209 lb)	25 – 26 November 2000
C	19	(Greece)	Chatzidakis, Manos	2.08 m (6 ft 10 in)	109 kg (240 lb)	26 – 21 April 2000
PF	21	(Greece)	Kamateros, Tasos	2.03 m (6 ft 8 in)	109 kg (240 lb)	26 – 19 May 2000
G	23	(Greece)	Papadakis, Kostas	1.91 m (6 ft 3 in)	84 kg (185 lb)	28 – 27 September 1998
PF	25	(United States)	Carius, Will	2.01 m (6 ft 7 in)	102 kg (225 lb)	28 – 9 March 1998
PF	31	(Greece)	Asimenios, Thanasis	2.01 m (6 ft 7 in)		18 – 12 January 2008
SF	32	(United States)	Anderson, Tytan	1.98 m (6 ft 6 in)	84 kg (185 lb)	24 – 17 April 2002
G	55	(Greece)	Nikolaidis, Alexandros	1.90 m (6 ft 3 in)	79 kg (174 lb)	24 – 21 August 2002
SF	88	(Greece)	Thomakos, Alexandros	1.96 m (6 ft 5 in)		18 – 26 May 2008

Head coach

- (Greece) Vassilis Xanthopoulos

Assistant coach(es)

- (Greece) Christoforos Stefanidis
- (Greece) Giannos Tzanis
- (Greece) Dimitris Antoniadis
- (Greece) Stefanos Makris

Trainer

- (Greece) Giorgos Angelou

Team manager

- (Greece) Giagkos Tripolitis

Legend

- (C) Team captain
- Injured

- Roster
Updated: 5 September 2026

=== Depth chart ===
Pos.	Starting 5	Bench 1	Bench 2	Bench 3
C	Omar Payne	Manos Chatzidakis		Joe Petrakis
PF	Will Carius	Giorgos Gkiouzelis	Tasos Kamateros	Thanasis Asimenios
SF	Tytan Anderson	Noah Freidel		Alexandros Thomakos
SG	Ty Nichols	Kostas Papadakis	John Ittounas	Vangelis Asonitis
PG	Jalen Finch	Alexandros Nikolaidis		Nikos Tziallas

== Titles and honours ==
=== European competitions ===
- FIBA Champions League
  - Final Four (1): 2023–24

=== Domestic competitions ===
- Greek Cup:
  - Finalists (1): 2022–23
- Greek Super Cup:
  - Finalists (1): 2020
- Greek A2 League (2nd Division):
  - Champions (3): 1988–89, 2008–09, 2017–18
- Greek B League (2nd Division / 3rd Division):
  - Champions (3): 1982–83 (2nd Division), 2006–07 (3rd Division), 2016–17 (3rd Division)
- Greek 3rd Division:
  - Champions (1): 1977–78 (ESKA)
- Greek 2nd Tier ESKA Cup:
  - Winners (1): 2014–15

== Seasons ==
Season	Greek League	Greek Cup	Europe	Head coach	Roster
1971–72	4th Division				
1972–73	4th Division				
1973–74	4th Division				
1974–75	4th Division				
1975–76	3rd Division	Quarterfinals			
1976–77	3rd Division	Phase IV			
1977–78	3rd Division (Champion)	Phase I		Faidon Matthaiou	
1978–79	2nd Division (Finalist)	Phase IV			
1979–80	2nd Division (Finalist)	Phase III			
1980–81	2nd Division (3rd place)	Phase III			
1981–82	2nd Division (3rd place)	Phase IV			
1982–83	2nd Division (Champion)	Quarterfinals		Thanasis Christoforou	
1983–84	10th place	Phase IV		Thanasis Christoforou	
1984–85	12th place	Phase II		Thanasis Christoforou	
1985–86	12th place	Quarterfinals			
1986–87	2nd Division (5th place)	Quarterfinals			
1987–88	2nd Division (3rd place)	Phase I			
1988–89	2nd Division (Champion)	Phase II			
1989–90	9th place	Quarterfinals			
1990–91	6th place	Quarterfinals			
1991–92	7th place	Phase III	FIBA Korać Cup; Round of 16	Kostas Petropoulos	Levertis Robinson, Angelos Koronios, Serafim Grekos, Brian Vaughns, Ioannis Milonas, George Agiasotelis, Nikos Tsagopoulos, Nikos Fasouras, Vassilis Batsios, Nikos Kasouridis
1992–93	7th place	Quarterfinals	FIBA Korać Cup; Round of 16	Kostas Petropoulos	Angelos Koronios, Serafim Grekos, Georgios Makaras, Ioannis Milonas, Gary Leonard, Nikos Tsagopoulos, James Church, Nikos Fasouras, Nikos Kasouridis
1993–94	5th place	Phase II	FIBA Korać Cup; Quarterfinals		Angelos Koronios, Serafim Grekos, Vassilis Batsios, Georgios Makaras, Ioannis Milonas, Argyris Pedoulakis, Nikos Tsagopoulos, Lance Berwald, Nikos Fasouras, Audie Norris, Nikos Kasouridis, George Labropoulos
1994–95	9th place	Quarterfinals	FIBA Korać Cup; Round of 16		Ioannis Kritikos, Angelos Koronios, Kostas Gkagkaoudakis, Georgios Makaras, Ioannis Milonas, Argyris Pedoulakis, George Singleton, Lance Berwald, Nikos Fasouras, Thodoros Aposkitis, Milan Gurović, Randy White
1995–96	7th place	Phase II		Dragan Šakota	
1996–97	4th place	Quarterfinals	FIBA Korać Cup; Quarterfinals	Dragan Šakota	Ioannis Kritikos, Ioannis Milonas, Pavlos Nontas, Angelos Koronios, Kostas Gkagkaoudakis, Georgios Makaras, Paolo Moretti, Marko Jarić, Paolo Alberti, Melvin Cheatum, Marlon Maxey, Milan Gurović, Thodoros Aposkitis
1997–98	9th place	Phase II	FIBA Korać Cup; Quarterfinals	Argyris Pedoulakis	Ioannis Kritikos, Angelos Koronios, Conner Henry, Pavlos Nontas, Garth Joseph, Marko Jarić, Milan Gurović, Thodoros Aposkitis, Christos Myriounis, Craig Robinson, Benoit Benjamin, Manolis Papamakarios, Kostas Gkagkaoudakis
1998–99	8th place	Phase II		Argyris Pedoulakis	
1999–00	5th place	Round of 16	FIBA Korać Cup; Round of 16	Argyris Pedoulakis	Ioannis Kritikos, Manolis Papamakarios, Kostas Gkagkaoudakis, Santiago Abad, Dejan Vostić, Jose Lasa, Alphonso Ford, Kostas Tsartsaris, Erik Meek, Robert Reisenbuchler, Hugues Occansey, John Brougos, Michalis Pelekanos, Alekos Petroulas
2000–01	3rd place	Round of 16	EuroLeague; Round of 16	Argyris Pedoulakis	Ioannis Kritikos, Manolis Papamakarios, Alexis Papadatos, Michalis Pelekanos, Aleksey Savrasenko, Byron Dinkins, Alphonso Ford, Kostas Tsartsaris, Fabio Ribeiro, Robert Reisenbuchler, Michael Andersen, John Brougos, Thanasis Efthimiou
2001–02	6th place	Round of 16	EuroLeague; Regular Season	Argyris Pedoulakis	Gary Grant, Manolis Papamakarios, Alexis Papadatos, Michalis Pelekanos, Ferran Martínez, Giorgos Pantazopoulos, Adam Wójcik, Kostas Tsartsaris, Agi Ibeja, Maurice Carter, Michael Andersen, Thanasis Efthimiou, Giannis Mitropoulos, Alexander Kühl, Byron Dinkins
2002–03	3rd place	Quarterfinals	FIBA Europe Champions Cup; South Conference Semifinals	Argyris Pedoulakis	Mirza Kurtović, Manolis Papamakarios, Ray Weathers, Michalis Pelekanos, Buck Johnson, Dejan Jovanovski, Giannis Mitropoulos, Andreas Glyniadakis, Agi Ibeja, Piotr Szybilski, Periklis Dorkofikis, Erick Barkley, Darren Mclinton, Larry Stewart, Andre Hutson, Milan Radovanović
2003–04	7th place	3rd place	FIBA Europe League; Regular Season	Argyris Pedoulakis	Mirza Kurtović, Manolis Papamakarios, Ioannis Sioutis, Michalis Pelekanos, Larry Stewart, Giorgos Melas, Franco Nakić, Grigorij Khizhnyak, Dimitris Mavroeidis, Antonis Mantzaris, Eric Cuthrell, Dimitris Makris, Giorgos Kalamaras, Vassilis Soulis, Pete Mickeal
2004–05	2nd Division (7th place)	Phase II		Nikos Karagiannis	
2005–06	2nd Division (14th place)	Phase I		Georgios Meletis	Dimitris Karatzios, Stergios Tsiabalis, Spyros Katsafouris, Nasos Choumpalis, Antonis Mantzaris, Giorgos Kalamaras, Efthimis Kyritsis, Giorgos Petropoulos, Dario Livajić, Gorjan Latific
2006–07	3rd Division (Champion)	Phase I		Manos Manouselis	Panagiotis Mantzanas, Giannis Deep, Franchisco Amato, Antonis Mantzaris, Dimos Fotiou, Giorgos Bozikas, Nemanja Ćuk, Giorgos Kalamaras, Christos Deligiannis, Vangelis Morfis, Nikos Kotinis, Vangelis Mantzaris
2007–08	2nd Division (5th place)	Phase II		Manos Manouselis; Dimitris Tziallas	Panagiotis Mantzanas, Filippos Moschovitis, Franchisco Amato, Antonis Mantzaris, Nikos Kokkalis, Vangelis Mantzaris, Nemanja Ćuk, Vangelis Margaritis, Christos Deligiannis, Cezary Trybański, Ralph Bucci, Nikos Kotinis
2008–09	2nd Division (Champion)	Phase I		Nikos Karagiannis	Angelos Siamandouras, Filippos Moschovitis, Darrel Lewis, Vangelis Mantzaris, Nikos Kokkalis, Antonis Mantzaris, Nikos Koumoulos, Vangelis Margaritis, Christos Deligiannis, Alexis Tsamatos, Ralph Bucci, Dimitris Despos, Sokratis Psaropoulos
2009–10	9th place	Phase II		Thanasis Skourtopoulos	Cliff Hammonds, Will Daniels, Nikos Papanikolopoulos, Vangelis Mantzaris, Mike Bramos, Rudy Mbemba, Antonis Mantzaris, Vangelis Margaritis, Christos Deligiannis, Sokratis Psaropoulos, Georgios Tsiakos, Jamie Arnold, Marcus Faison, Shaun Pruitt, Spencer Nelson, Gary Wilkinson, Reece Gaines, Lazaros Agadakos
2010–11	7th place	Phase II		Argyris Pedoulakis	Vangelis Mantzaris, Mike King, Sokratis Psaropoulos, Dimitris Papanikolaou, Antonis Mantzaris, Ernest Scott, Georgios Tsiakos, Alekos Petroulas, Julian Sensley, Kurt Looby, Jure Močnik, Duane Woodward
2011–12	12th place	Phase II		Argyris Pedoulakis	Nondas Papantoniou, Panagiotis Kafkis, Sokratis Psaropoulos, Charis Giannopoulos, Richard Roby, Ernest Scott, Eric Boateng, Alekos Petroulas, Emir Zimić, Georgios Bogris, Jure Močnik, Gavin Edwards, Theodoros Tsiloulis, Georgios Papagiannis, Boško Jovović, Aleksandar Mitrović
2012–13	13th place	Phase II		Tzimis Koustenis	Nondas Papantoniou, Dimitris Kompodietas, Smush Parker, Dwight Thorne, Andreas Kanonidis, Verdell Jones, Antonis Mantzaris, Darrin Williams, Tyler Hines, Alekos Petroulas, Petros Melissaratos, Christos Lakkas, Andreas Psaropoulos, Jonathan Mitchell, Giorgos Galiotos
2013–14	3rd Division (9th place)			Vangelis Vlachos; Nasos Choumpalis	
2014–15	3rd Division (4th place)	2nd Division ESKA Cup (Winners)		Kostas Papamarkos	
2015–16	2nd Division (13th place)	Phase II		Nikos Karagiannis	Christos Lakkas, Thodoris Tsiotras, Giorgos Papadionisiou, Michalis Polytarchou, Sokratis Psaropoulos, Sakis Skoulidas, Kostas Papantonakos, Robert Gilchrist, Alekos Petroulas, Dimitris Katiakos, Georgios Galiotos
2016–17	3rd Division (Champion)			Nikos Karagiannis	Alkis Pappas, Diogenis Gorgonis, Christos Dakoulias, Antonis Mantzaris, Michalis Polytarchou, Spyros Magkounis, Kostas Papantonakos, Christophoros Likogiannis, Dimitris Katiakos, Lazaros Tasopoulos, Thanasis Dombrogiannis
2017–18	2nd Division (Champion)	Phase I		Nikos Karagiannis	Kee-Kee Clark, Alkis Pappas, Igor Milošević, Thanos Konstantakopoulos, Giorgos Angelou, Michalis Polytarchou, Antonis Mantzaris, Spyros Magkounis, Alexandros Sigkounas, Tasos Dimitriadis, Gaios Skordilis, Vassilis Symtsak
2018–19	4th place	Quarterfinals		Argyris Pedoulakis	Zois Karampelas, Ryan Harrow, Kee-Kee Clark, Jordan Callahan, Scoochie Smith, Steven Gray, Vassilis Mouratos, Ramone Moore, Henrik Širko, Ioannis Agravanis, Chris Flemmings, Panos Vasilopoulos, Panagiotis Filippakos, Ben Bentil, Ed Daniel, Gaios Skordilis
2019–20	3rd place	Semifinals	FIBA Champions League; Round of 16	Ilias Zouros; Nikos Papanikolopoulos	Zois Karampelas, Vassilis Xanthopoulos, William Hatcher, Scoochie Smith, Isaiah Cousins, Steven Gray, DeAndre Kane, Christos Saloustros, Brayon Blake, Ioannis Agravanis, Moses Kingsley, Panos Vasilopoulos, Yanick Moreira, Mike Morrison, Costis Gontikas, Gaios Skordilis
2020–21	6th place	Quarterfinals	FIBA Champions League; Regular Season	Nikos Papanikolopoulos; Argyris Pedoulakis; Sotiris Manolopoulos	Zois Karampelas, Steven Gray, Christos Saloustros, Panos Vasilopoulos, Gaios Skordilis, Tre McLean, Marvin Jones, Terran Petteway, Jaye Crockett, Jorge Gutiérrez, Vangelis Mantzaris, Michalis Tsairelis, Ioannis Bourousis, James Woodard, Jordan Ford, Ioannis Athinaiou, Abdul Gaddy, Ryan Harrow, Loukas Mavrokefalidis, Jonathan Arledge
2021–22	8th place	Quarterfinals	FIBA Europe Cup; Regular Season	Sotiris Manolopoulos; Milan Tomić	Steven Gray, Christos Saloustros, Terran Petteway, Yanick Moreira, Ian Miller, Chad Brown, Dimitris Katsivelis, Linos Chrysikopoulos, Josh Hagins, Dimitris Moraitis, Erik McCree, Tomasz Gielo, Glenn Cosey, Vassilis Christidis, Danny Agbelese, Vangelis Zougris
2022–23	3rd place	Finalist	Basketball Champions League; Play-ins	Vassilis Spanoulis	Miro Bilan, Marcus Denmon, Dimitris Moraitis, Aleksa Radanov, Sylvain Francisco, Leonidas Kaselakis, Stelios Poulianitis, Ian Hummer, Matt Coleman III, Nikos Persidis, Nikos Chougkaz, Vangelis Zougris (Shakur Juiston, Dimitris Agravanis, Devin Davis, and Giorgos Gkiouzelis left during the season.)
2023–24	3rd place	Quarterfinals	Basketball Champions League; Final Four	Vassilis Spanoulis	Trevor Thompson, Leonidas Kaselakis, Nemanja Dangubić, Jermaine Love, Joe Ragland, Nate Renfro, Nikos Chougkaz, Kenny Williams, Stelios Poulianitis, Elijah Mitrou-Long, Vangelis Zougris, Vassilis Xanthopoulos (Jaylen Hands left during the season)
2024–25	8th place	Quarterfinals	Basketball Champions League Play-ins	Georgios Limniatis	Neoklis Avdalas, Tobin Carberry, Chris Coffey, Jarell Eddie, C.J. Harris, Ahmed Hill, Vladimir Jankovic, George Papas, Stelios Poulianitis, Sotiris Stavrakopoulos, Dimitrios Tsourgiannis, Vassilis Xanthopoulos, Evangelos Zougris, (Justin Patton, Chad Brown, Jalen Riley left during the season)
2025–26	6th place	Play-in	FIBA Europe Cup Quarterfinals	Vasilis Xanthopoulos	Riley Abercrombie, Alvaro Cardenas, Will Carius, C.J. Harris, Vladimir Jankovic, Dimitrios Kaklamanakis, Vasilis Mouratos, Ty Nichols, Kostas Papadakis, Omar Payne, Jake Van Tubbergen, John Ittounas, Joe Petrakis

== Notable players ==
Note: Flags indicate national team eligibility at FIBA-sanctioned events. Players may hold other non-FIBA nationalities not displayed.

Criteria

To appear in this section a player must have either:

- Set a club record or won an individual award while at the club
- Played at least one official international match for their national team at any time
- Played at least one official NBA match at any time.

Greece:

- Dimitris Agravanis
- Ioannis Athinaiou
- Neoklis Avdalas
- Ioannis Bourousis
- Efthimis Bakatsias
- Mike Bramos
- Nikos Chougkaz
- Vassilis Christidis
- Linos Chrysikopoulos
- Dimitris Despos
- Periklis Dorkofikis
- Charis Giannopoulos
- Vlado Janković
- Argiris Kambouris
- Leonidas Kaselakis
- Dimitris Katsivelis
- Dimitris Kompodietas
- Angelos Koronios
- Georgios Makaras
- Antonis Mantzaris
- Vangelis Mantzaris
- Vangelis Margaritis
- Dimitris Mavroeidis
- Loukas Mavrokefalidis
- Ioannis Milonas
- Elijah Mitrou-Long
- Dimitris Moraitis
- Vassilis Mouratos
- Christos Myriounis
- Manolis Papamakarios
- Dimitris Papanikolaou
- Georgios Papagiannis
- George Papas
- Argyris Pedoulakis
- Michalis Pelekanos
- Alekos Petroulas
- Michalis Polytarchou
- Stelios Poulianitis
- Christos Saloustros
- Ioannis Sioutis
- Gaios Skordilis
- Michalis Tsairelis
- Kostas Tsartsaris
- Georgios Tsiakos
- Panos Vasilopoulos
- Vassilis Xanthopoulos
- Vangelis Zougris

Europe:

- Miro Bilan
- Michael Andersen
- - Milan Gurović
- - Marko Jarić
- Nemanja Dangubić
- Jure Močnik
- Paolo Moretti
- Hugues Occansey
- Sylvain Francisco
- - Aleksey Savrasenko
- Tomasz Gielo
- Cezary Trybański

USA:

- Benoit Benjamin
- Kee-Kee Clark
- Chris Coffey
- Byron Dinkins
- Marcus Denmon
- Jarrell Eddie
- Alphonso Ford
- Reece Gaines
- Gary Grant
- Steven Gray
- Jaylen Hands
- Ryan Harrow
- Conner Henry
- Buck Johnson
- - Garth Joseph
- Priest Lauderdale
- Gary Leonard
- Jermaine Love
- Audie Norris
- Andre Hutson
- Pete Mickeal
- Marlon Maxey
- Terran Petteway
- - Joe Ragland
- Nate Renfro
- Larry Stewart
- Trevor Thompson
- Randy White
- Kenny Williams

Africa:

- Yanick Moreira
- Ben Bentil

== Retired numbers ==
Peristeri B.C. retired numbers
N°	Nat.	Player	Position	Years With Club
#10	(United States)	Alphonso Ford	SG	1999–2001
#13	(Greece)	Nikos Fasouras	C	1984–1996

== Head coaches ==
Head coach	Years
(Greece) Spyros Foskolos
(Greece) Faidon Matthaiou	1976–1978
(Greece) (United States) Thanasis Christoforou	1982–1985
(Greece) Kostas Petropoulos	1991–1993
(Greece) Vassilis Fragkias	1993
(Greece) (United States) Steve Giatzoglou	1994
(Greece) Kostas Missas	1994–1995
(Serbia) Dragan Šakota	1995–1997
(Greece) Argyris Pedoulakis	1997–2004, 2010–2012, 2018–2019, 2020–2021
(Greece) Ilias Zouros	2004, 2019
(Greece) Georgios Meletis	2005–2006
(Greece) Manos Manouselis	2006–2008
(Greece) Dimitris Tziallas	2008
(Greece) Nikos Karagiannis	2004–2005, 2008–2009, 2015–2018
(Greece) Thanasis Skourtopoulos	2009–2010
(Greece) Tzimis Koustenis	2012–2013
(Greece) Vangelis Vlachos	2013
(Greece) Nasos Choumpalis	2013–2014
(Greece) Kostas Papamarkos	2014–2015
(Greece) Nikos Papanikolopoulos	2019–2020
(Greece) Sotiris Manolopoulos	2021
(Serbia) (Greece) Milan Tomić	2021–2022
(Greece) Vassilis Spanoulis	2022–2024
(Greece) Georgios Limniatis	2024–2025
(Greece) Vasilis Xanthopoulos	2025–present
