= John Ittounas =

Greek American basketball player

No. 5 – Peristeri
- Position: Point guard / shooting guard
- League: Greek Basketball League

Personal information
- Born: September 2, 2002 (age 24) Lincolnshire, Illinois, U.S.
- Listed height: 6 ft 3 in (1.91 m)
- Listed weight: 200 lb (91 kg)

Career information
- High school: Stevenson (Lincolnshire, Illinois)
- College: Wisconsin–Whitewater (2020–2021); Triton (2021–2022); Elmhurst (2022–2024)
- NBA draft: 2024: undrafted
- Playing career: 2024–present

Career history
- 2024–2025: HANTH
- 2025–present: Peristeri

Tzon Milton Ittounas (born September 2, 2002) is a Greek American professional basketball player for Peristeri of the Greek Basketball League. Ittounas played college basketball for three different teams before starting his pro career. He is a 6-foot-3-inch (1.91 m) tall combo guard.

== High school career ==
Born in Lincolnshire, Illinois, Ittounas attended Stevenson High School.

== College career ==
Ittounas played college basketball with three different teams. From 2020 to 2024, Ittounas played with Wisconsin–Whitewater Warhawks, Triton College and Elmhurst Bluejays.

== Professional career ==
On August 27, 2024, Ittounas began his professional career with HANTH of the Greek A2 Elite League.

On June 26, 2025, Ittounas signed with Peristeri of the Greek Basket League. He renewed his contract for one more season on August 7, 2026.
