= 2003–04 FIBA Europe League =

First season of the FIBA Europe League

FIBA Europe League
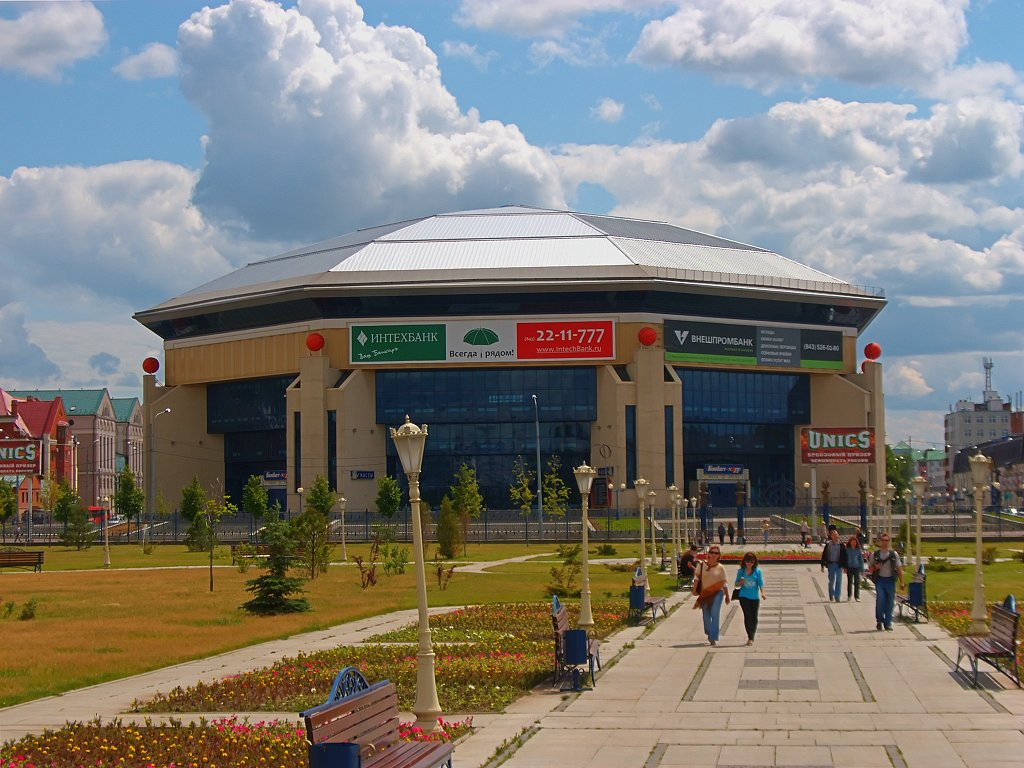
- The Final Four was played at the Basket-Hall Kazan
- Season: 2003–04
- Teams: 30

Finals
- Champions: (Russia) UNICS (1st title)
- Runners-up: (Greece) TIM Maroussi
- Third place: (Israel) Hapoel Tel Aviv
- Fourth place: (Russia) Ural Great Perm
- Final Four MVP: (Estonia) Martin Müürsepp

Statistical leaders
Points	(United States) Duane Woodward	21.4
Rebounds	(United States) Chris Ensminger	12.6
Assists	(United States) Stevin Smith	6.8

The 2003–04 FIBA Europe League was the first season of the FIBA Europe League, the newly established third tier in European basketball and FIBA's top competition. A total number of 30 teams participated in the competition, five of which were domestic champions. UNICS took the title after winning the Final Four.

== Team allocation ==
There were five domestic champions and six runners-up (including Germany, Russia and Israel) in the new competition which sported a similar name to FIBA European League, the name under which the EuroLeague was known until 1996. The labels in the parentheses show how each team qualified for the place of its starting round.

- 1st, 2nd, etc.: League position after Playoffs

Regular season
(Russia) Ural Great (2nd)	(Greece) Aris BSA (5th)	(Israel) Hapoel Tel Aviv (7th)	(Estonia) Kalev Tallinn (5th)
(Russia) UNICS (3rd)	(Greece) TIM Maroussi (6th)	(Poland) Anwil Wloclawek (1st)	(Finland) Honka Playboys (1st)
(Russia) Khimki (4th)	(Ukraine) Azovmash (1st)	(Poland) Polonia Warsaw (4th)	(Germany) GHP Bamberg (2nd)
(Russia) Dynamo Moscow (7th)	(Ukraine) Odesa (2nd)	(Federal Republic of Yugoslavia) Hemofarm (5th)	(Latvia) Skonto (2nd)
(France) SLUC Nancy (6th)	(Ukraine) Kyiv (3rd)	(Federal Republic of Yugoslavia) Vojvodina NIS (8th)	(Lithuania) Alita (3rd)
(France) Paris Basket Racing (7th)	(Belgium) Dexia Union Mons-Hainaut (2nd)	(Bosnia and Herzegovina) Široki Hercegtisak (1st)	(Turkey) Turk Telekom (4th)
(France) STB Le Havre (8th)	(Belgium) Telindus Oostende (3rd)	(Czech Republic) ECM Nymburk (2nd)	
(Greece) Peristeri (4th)	(Israel) Strauss Iscar Nahariya (2nd)	(Cyprus) EKA AEL Limassol (1st)	

== Qualifying round ==
=== Group A ===
Pos	Team	Pld	W	L	PF	PA	PD	Qualification
1	(Russia) UNICS	12	11	1	1058	804	+254	Advance to play-offs
2	(Ukraine) Azovmash Mariupol	12	7	5	919	875	+44	Advance to play-offs
3	(Turkey) Türk Telekom	12	6	6	899	914	−15	Advance to play-offs
4	(Belgium) Telindus Oostende	12	6	6	979	1000	−21	Advance to play-offs
5	(Bosnia and Herzegovina) Široki Hercegtisak	12	6	6	899	952	−53	
6	(France) STB Le Havre	12	4	8	797	890	−93	
7	(Lithuania) Alita	12	2	10	852	968	−116	

Source: FIBA Europe

=== Group B ===
Pos	Team	Pld	W	L	PF	PA	PD	Qualification
1	(Poland) Anwil Włocławek	12	9	3	902	867	+35	Advance to play-offs
2	(Serbia and Montenegro) Hemofarm	12	8	4	960	882	+78	Advance to play-offs
3	(Cyprus) EKA AEL Limassol	12	7	5	842	840	+2	Advance to play-offs
4	(Russia) Khimki	12	6	6	972	968	+4	Advance to play-offs
5	(Greece) Peristeri	12	5	7	914	948	−34	
6	(France) Paris Basket Racing	12	4	8	885	946	−61	
7	(Belgium) Dexia Mons-Hainaut	12	3	9	897	921	−24	

Source: FIBA Europe

=== Group C ===
Pos	Team	Pld	W	L	PF	PA	PD	Qualification
1	(Russia) Ural Great	14	11	3	1253	1064	+189	Advance to play-offs
2	(Israel) Hapoel Tel Aviv	14	10	4	1154	990	+164	Advance to play-offs
3	(Germany) GHP Bamberg	14	10	4	1045	1053	−8	Advance to play-offs
4	(Greece) Aris BSA	14	9	5	1171	1072	+99	Advance to play-offs
5	(Poland) Polonia Warsaw	14	7	7	1145	1156	−11	
6	(Ukraine) Kyiv	14	5	9	1046	1107	−61	
7	(Latvia) Skonto	14	3	11	1031	1193	−162	
8	(Finland) Honka Playboys	14	1	13	941	1151	−210	

Source: FIBA Europe

=== Group D ===
Pos	Team	Pld	W	L	PF	PA	PD	Qualification
1	(Russia) Dynamo Moscow	14	11	3	1233	1090	+143	Advance to play-offs
2	(Israel) Strauss Iscar Nahariya	14	11	3	1251	1134	+117	Advance to play-offs
3	(Greece) TIM Maroussi	14	10	4	1161	1037	+124	Advance to play-offs
4	(Serbia and Montenegro) NIS Vojvodina	14	9	5	1193	1115	+78	Advance to play-offs
5	(Czech Republic) ECM Nymburk	14	6	8	1172	1179	−7	
6	(France) SLUC Nancy	14	5	9	1107	1148	−41	
7	(Ukraine) Odesa	14	3	11	1084	1182	−98	
8	(Estonia) Kalev Tallinn	14	1	13	984	1300	−316	

Source: FIBA Europe

== Play-offs ==
Round of 16
(Serbia and Montenegro) Vojvodina	67	73
(Russia) UNICS	77	85
(Germany) GHP Bamberg	66	70
(Serbia and Montenegro) Hemofarm	80	79
(Russia) Ural Great	100	79	88
(Russia) Khimki	94	85	67
(Turkey) Türk Telekom	78	75
(Israel) Ironi Nahariya	101	98
(Greece) TIM Maroussi	76	88
(Ukraine) Azovmash Mariupol	70	84
(Greece) Aris BSA	96	98
(Poland) Anwil Włocławek	85	92
(Cyprus) EKA AEL Limassol	66	73
(Israel) Hapoel Tel Aviv	87	89
(Belgium) Telindus Oostende	74	70
(Russia) Dynamo Moscow	94	72

Quarter-finals
(Russia) UNICS	76	70	87
(Serbia and Montenegro) Hemofarm	52	71	58
(Russia) Ural Great	96	77	81
(Israel) Ironi Nahariya	91	89	73
(Greece) TIM Maroussi	85	93	99
(Greece) Aris BSA	76	101	90
(Israel) Hapoel Tel Aviv	92	83
(Russia) Dynamo Moscow	82	80

Semi-finals
(Russia) UNICS	93
(Russia) Ural Great	68
(Greece) TIM Maroussi	92
(Israel) Hapoel Tel Aviv	74

Final
(Russia) UNICS	87
(Greece) TIM Maroussi	63
Third place
(Russia) Ural Great	104
(Israel) Hapoel Tel Aviv	112

2003–04 FIBA Europe League

UNICS
1st title

== See also ==
- 2003-04 Euroleague
- 2003-04 ULEB Cup
- 2003–04 FIBA Europe Cup

== Sources ==
- 2003-04 at Eurobasket.com
- 2003-04 at FIBA Europe
- Linguasport
