= Ty Nichols =

American basketball player (born 1996)

No. 0 – Peristeri
- Position: Point guard / shooting guard
- League: Greek Basketball League

Personal information
- Born: October 13, 1996 (age 30) Springfield, Massachusetts, U.S.
- Listed height: 6 ft 3 in (1.91 m)
- Listed weight: 187 lb (85 kg)

Career information
- High school: Chicopee Comprehensive (Chicopee, Massachusetts); Roger L Putnam Vocational-Technical (Springfield, Massachusetts)
- College: Keene State (2015–2019)
- NBA draft: 2019: undrafted
- Playing career: 2019–present

Career history
- 2019–2021: Prizreni
- 2021: Vëllaznimi
- 2021: Prizreni
- 2021–2023: Děčín
- 2023–2024: Sluneta Ústí nad Labem
- 2024: Patrioti Levice
- 2024–2025: EWE Baskets Oldenburg
- 2025: Zastal Zielona Góra
- 2025–2026: Peristeri
- 2026: Maccabi Ironi Ramat Gan
- 2026-present: Peristeri

Career highlights
- Czech League MVP (2024); Czech Cup winner (2023); Czech Cup MVP (2023); LEC Player of the Year (2019); 2× First-team All–LEC (2018, 2019); LEC Tournament MVP (2019)

Ty Nichols (born October 13, 1996) is an American professional basketball player for Peristeri B.C. of the Greek Basketball League.

== Early career ==
Nichols grew up with seven siblings. In 2003, his father died after having been in a coma for three years following a car accident. Nichols, who was also a talented American football player, was a member of the Chicopee Comprehensive High School basketball team in Chicopee, Massachusetts, before transferring to the Roger L Putnam Vocational-Technical High School in Springfield, Massachusetts.

== College career ==
From 2015 to 2019, Nichols played for the Keene State team in NCAA Division III while studying in New Hampshire. He rose to the top of the college team's all-time scoring list. In his final season at Keene State College, Nichols averaged 27.4 points per game.

== Professional career ==
His professional basketball career began in Kosovo with Prizreni and Vëllaznimi. On 2021, Nichols joined Děčín in Czech Republic. He stayed with the club for two years. On 2023, he moved to Sluneta Ústí nad Labem.

He sterted the 2024–25 season with Patrioti Levice in Slovakia, averaging 18.5 points per game. In December 2024, he was signed by German Bundesliga club EWE Baskets Oldenburg. After seven Bundesliga appearances, in which he averaged 4.4 points, Nichols moved in January 2025 to Poland to join Zastal Zielona Góra, averaging 15.9 points in 35 appearances for the Polish top-division club.

On 2025,Nichols joined Peristeri of the Greek Basketball League and the FIBA Europe Cup. On May 17, 2026, he joined Maccabi Ironi Ramat Gan of the Israeli Basketball Premier League (Ligat HaAl) for the rest of the season. On July 7, Nichols re-signed with Peristeri of the Greek Basketball League after his short stint in Israel.
