= Ikaros Kallitheas B.C. =

K.A.E. Ikaros Kallitheas
- Leagues: Greek C Basket League
- Founded: 1991
- History: Ikaros Nea Smyrni (1991–2007); Ikaros Kallitheas (2007–2009); Ikaros Kallitheas-Esperos (2009–2010); Ikaros Kallitheas (2010–2013); Ikaros Chalkidas (2013–2014); Ikaros Kallitheas (2014–present)
- Arena: Esperos Indoor Hall
- Capacity: 1,000
- Location: Kallithea, Athens, Greece
- Team colors: Blue, White, and Red
- President: Dimitris Angelopoulos
- Team manager: Dimitris Papadopoulos
- Championships: A2 Championships: (1) (2010)
- Website: ikarosbc.gr
Home	Away

Ikaros Kallitheas B.C. (formerly Ikaros Chalkidas B.C.) is a professional basketball club that is based in Kallithea, Athens, Greece. The club has changed its home location several times. It was originally based in Nea Smyrni, and later moved to Kallithea, then moved for a while to Chalkida, and finally returned to Kallithea. Its full official name is Panathlitikos Omilos Kallitheas Ikaros, or P.O.K. Ikaros. The club's colors are white, blue, and red.

== Logos ==
(The club's logo when it was based in Chalkida.)

(The club's Kallithea logo.)

== History ==
The club was founded in 1991, and was originally based in Nea Smyrni, Athens. In 2007, the club's home became Kallithea, Athens. In 2009, the club merged with Esperos Kallitheas, and played the 2009–10 season under the name of Ikaros Kallitheas-Esperos. In that same season, the club won the Greek 2nd Division championship.

After winning the Greek 2nd Division in the 2009–10 season, the club broke away from its merger with Esperos Kallitheas, and once again took the name of Ikaros Kallitheas. They competed in the top league in Greece, the Greek Basket League, for the first time in the 2010–11 season. In 2013, the club moved to Chalkida.

At the finish of the 2013–14 season, Ikaros Kallitheas was relegated to the Greek 2nd Division. But for the next season, the club declared that it was unable to take part in the A2 Division, and was then relegated to the Greek B Basket League. Simultaneously, the club returned to Kallithea. and was renamed again to Ikaros Kallitheas.

== Arenas ==
When Ikaros has been based in Kallithea, they played their home games at the Esperos Indoor Hall, a small arena with a capacity of 1,000, and at Glyfada Makis Liougas Sportshall, an arena with a capacity of 3,500. During the time when the club was playing in Chalkida, they played their homes games at Chalkida Indoor Hall, an arena with a capacity of 1,620.

== Titles and honors ==
=== Domestic competitions ===
- Total Titles: 2
  - Greek 4th Division Champion: (2007)
  - Greek 2nd Division Champion: (2010)

== Notable players ==
Note: Flags indicate national team eligibility at FIBA-sanctioned events. Players may hold other non-FIBA nationalities not displayed.

Criteria

To appear in this section a player must have either:

- Set a club record or won an individual award while at the club
- Played at least one official international match for their national team at any time
- Played at least one official NBA match at any time.

- (Greece) Giannis Kalampokis
- (Greece) Fanis Koumbouras
- (Greece) Georgios Tsiaras
- (Greece) Lazaros Agadakos
- (Greece) Giannoulis Larentzakis
- (Greece) Michalis Polytarchou
- (Greece) Sotiris Manolopoulos
- (Greece) Vassilis Toliopoulos
- (Greece) Alexis Kyritsis
- (Greece) Vassilis Symtsak
- (Greece) Vangelis Karampoulas
- (Greece) Ioannis Dimakos
- (Serbia) Mladen Pantić
- (Bosnia and Herzegovina) Saša Vasiljević
- (Ivory Coast) Deon Thompson
- (Germany) Julian Sensley
- (Latvia) Māris Ļaksa
- (Senegal) Mouhammad Faye
- (Australia) Aron Baynes
- (Mexico) Romel Beck
- (United States Virgin Islands) / (Puerto Rico) Ivan Aska
- (United States) Pat Carroll
- (United States) Lance Harris
- (United States) Kyle McAlarney
- (United States) Michael Antonio "Mike" King
- (United States) Jimmy Baxter

== Head coaches ==
- (Greece) Aris Lykogiannis
- (Greece) Dimitrios Priftis
