= Ioannis Milonas =

Greek basketball player

Personal information
- Born: July 27, 1969 (age 57) Trikala, Greece
- Listed height: 6 ft 7.5 in (2.02 m)

Career information
- NBA draft: 1991: undrafted
- Playing career: 1989–2008
- Position: Small forward

Career history
- 1989–1997: Peristeri
- 1997–1998: Apollon Patras
- 1999–2000: Dafni
- 2005–2007: Faros
- 2007–2008: Palaimon Korinthou
Medals
Men's basketball
Representing Greece
Mediterranean Games
| Silver medal – second place | 1991 Greece | Under-26 |

Ioannis Milonas (alternate spelling: Giannis) (Greek: Γιάννης Μυλωνάς; born July 27, 1969, in Trikala, Greece) is a retired Greek professional basketball player. At a height of 2.02 m (6 ft 7 1/2 in), he played at the small forward position.

== Professional career ==
Milonas began playing basketball with Danaos Trikallon. In his pro career, he then played with Peristeri from 1989 to 1997. He also played with Apollon Patras (1997–98), Dafni (1999–00), and Faros Keratsini (2005–07).

== National team career ==
Milonas was a member of the senior men's Greek national basketball team. With Greece's senior national team, he played at EuroBasket 1991. He was also a member of the Greek national team that finished in 4th place at the 1994 FIBA World Championship.
