= Vangelis Karampoulas =

Greek basketball player

Vangelis Karampoulas Βαγγέλης Καράμπουλας
Mykonos
- Position: Shooting guard / small forward
- League: Greek 3rd Division

Personal information
- Born: November 18, 1981 (age 44)
- Listed height: 6 ft 6.75 in (2.00 m)
- Listed weight: 220 lb (100 kg)

Career information
- NBA draft: 2003: undrafted
- Playing career: 1999–present

Career history
- 1999–2005: Sporting
- 2005–2006: Makedonikos
- 2006–2007: MENT
- 2007–2008: Panellinios
- 2008–2009: Iraklis Thessaloniki
- 2009–2012: Ikaros Kallitheas
- 2012–2013: Nea Kifissia
- 2013–2014: AEK Athens
- 2014–2015: Kavala
- 2015–2017: Faros Keratsiniou
- 2017–2019: Ionikos Nikaias
- 2019–2020: Diagoras Dryopideon
- 2020–2021: Aigaleo

Career highlights
- 5× Greek 2nd Division champion (2010, 2013–2015, 2019); 3× Greek 2nd Division MVP (2010, 2013, 2017); 2× Greek 2nd Division Top Scorer (2005, 2020); Greek 3rd Division champion (2018)

Evangelos "Vangelis" Karampoulas (alternate spellings: Vaggelis, Karaboulas) (Greek: Ευάγγελος "Βαγγέλης" Καράμπουλας; born November 18, 1981) is a Greek professional basketball player. He is a 2.00 m (6 ft 6 3/4 in) tall shooting guard–small forward. His nickname is Mr. Promotion, due to the fact that the clubs he plays with almost always get promoted to the next higher league level.

== Professional career ==
During his professional career, Karampoulas has played with some of the following clubs in Greece: Sporting, Makedonikos, MENT, Panellinios (EuroCup), Iraklis, Ikaros Kallitheas, AENK, AEK Athens, Kavala, and Faros Keratsiniou.

He was voted the Greek 2nd Division's MVP in 2010, 2013, and 2017. His teams managed to earn a league promotion from the Greek 2nd Division to the top-tier level Greek 1st Division in five consecutive seasons, achieving this eight times overall (2010, 2013, 2014, 2015, 2016, 2017, 2019, 2020), while also winning the Greek 2nd Division championship a total of five times (2010, 2013, 2014, 2015, 2019).

In 2017, he joined the Greek 3rd Division club Ionikos Nikaias. During the Greek 2nd Division 2018–19 season, while playing with Ionikos, he scored 61 points in a game against Ethnikos Piraeus. During the game, he made 10 three-point field goals.
