= Joe Petrakis =

Greek American basketball player

No. 3 – Peristeri
- Position: Power forward / center
- League: Greek Basketball League

Personal information
- Born: March 28, 2001 (age 25) Wichita, Kansas, U.S.
- Listed height: 6 ft 11 in (2.11 m)
- Listed weight: 224 lb (102 kg)

Career information
- High school: Valley Center (Wichita, Kansas)
- College: Dodge City CC (2018–2019); Kansas State (2019–2021); Western Carolina (2021–2022); Illinois State (2022–2023); Western Illinois (2023)
- NBA draft: 2024: undrafted
- Playing career: 2024–present

Career history
- 2024: Spars Sarajevo
- 2024–2025: Apollon Limassol
- 2025–present: Peristeri

Gregory John Petrakis II (born March 28, 2001) is a Greek American professional basketball player for Peristeri of the Greek Basketball League. Petrakis played college basketball for five different teams before starting his pro career. He is a 6-foot-11-inch (2.11 m) tall power forward–center.

== College career ==
Born in Wichita, Kansas, Petrakis played college basketball with five different teams. From 2018 to 2024, Petrakis played with Dodge City Community College, Kansas State Wildcats , Western Carolina, Illinois State and Western Illinois.

== Professional career ==
On January 25, 2024, Petrakis began his professional career with Spars Sarajevo of the Bosnian League.

After his first season, he moved to Cyprus and joined Apollon Limassol.

On June 27, 2025, Petrakis signed with Peristeri of the Greek Basket League.
