= G.S. Peristeri =

Greek Sports Club

- Full name: Gymnastikos Syllogos Peristeri; Γυμναστικός Σύλλογος Περιστερίου
- Founded: October 22, 1971
- Colours: Blue and Yellow
- Chairman: Philippos Kotsis
- Website: Official Website

G.S. Peristeri (Greek: Γ.Σ. Περιστερίου), full name, Gymnastikos Syllogos Peristeri (Greek: Γυμναστικός Σύλλογος Περιστερίου), is a Greek multi-sport club that is located in Peristeri, Greece. The club was founded on October 22, 1971. The club's emblem is the dove symbol, and the club's colors are yellow and blue.

The club has the following athletic departments: men's basketball, women's basketball, men's water polo, women's water polo, swimming, and synchronised swimming.

== Departments ==
- Peristeri B.C. - men's basketball
- Peristeri (women's basketball) - women's basketball
- Peristeri Water Polo Club - men's water polo
- Peristeri (women's water polo) - women's water polo
- Peristeri (swimming club) - swimming, synchronised swimming

== Logos ==
(The official logo of G.S. Peristeri.)

(The official alternate logo of G.S. Peristeri.)

(Peristeri B.C.'s official dove symbol.)

(Peristeri B.C.'s official basketball club logo.)

== Men's basketball ==
Peristeri B.C. was founded in 1971.

== Women's basketball ==
Peristeri (women's basketball) was founded in 1995.
