= Nea Kifissia B.C. =

AENK
- Nickname: Neophytes
- Leagues: Greek B League; Greek Cup
- Founded: 1996; 30 years ago
- History: Nea Kifissia B.C. (1996–present)
- Arena: Zirineio Indoor Hall
- Capacity: 1,500
- Location: Kifissia, Greece
- Team colors: Red, White, and Blue
- President: Panagiotis Latsoudas
- 2015–16 position: Greek Basket League 6th
- Championships: 1 Greek A2 League (2013)
- Website: aenkbc.gr
Home	Away

Nea Kifissia or Nea Kifisia B.C., or New Kifissia B.C. (Greek: Νέας Κηφισιάς KAE), is a Greek professional basketball club that is based in Kifissia, a suburban town in the Athens urban area, Greece. The club's full name is Athletic Union Nea Kifissia (Αθλητική Ένωση Νέας Κηφισιάς), which is also abbreviated as Α.E.Ν.Κ., which is the club's common name. The club is also known by the name A.E.N. Kifissia (Α.Ε.Ν. Κηφισιάς).

== History ==
Nea Kifissia B.C. English logo.

A.E.N.K. was founded in 1994, with the men's basketball section being started in 1996. The club competed in the Greek Second Division, for the first time, during the 2011–12 season. The club won the Greek Second Division championship in 2013.

They played in the top league in Greece, the Greek Basket League, for the first time in the 2013–14 season. The club's first season in the league was amazing, considering it was their first time competing in Greece's top division. They finished in fifth place in the regular season.

The success of the club has been compared with the success that Maroussi had in the Greek League in the recent previous years, in where a nearby local Athens community club (Marousi and Kifissia are located near each other) was able to achieve good results on the Greek national level.

In the 2016–17 season, the club qualified to play for the first time in a Europe-wide league tournament, as they qualified to play in the Champions League. However, the club declined its place in the Champions League due to financial issues.

In 2016, the club was relegated down from the first-tier Greek Basket League, to the third-tier Greek B League, due to financial problems. Nowadays the team competes in Greek C League.

== Championships ==
- Greek A2 League

Winners (1): 2012–13

== Roster ==
Note: Flags indicate national team eligibility at FIBA-sanctioned events. Players may hold other non-FIBA nationalities not displayed.

Nea Kiffisia B.C. roster
Players
Coaches

Pos.	No.	Nat.	Name	Ht.	Wt.	Age
PG	3	(Greece)	Moschovitis, Filippos	1.90 m (6 ft 3 in)		47 – 26 November 1978
G	6	(Greece)	Michalos, Nikos (C)	1.92 m (6 ft 4 in)	86 kg (190 lb)	49 – 21 May 1977
G	7	(Greece)	Flionis, Dimitris	1.90 m (6 ft 3 in)		29 – 8 April 1997
C	8	(United States)	Buckner, Eric	2.08 m (6 ft 10 in)	100 kg (220 lb)	36 – 26 April 1990
F	9	(Greece)	Kouzeloglou, Giannis	2.07 m (6 ft 9 in)	95 kg (209 lb)	31 – 7 January 1995
C	15	(Greece)	Karavanas, Panagiotis	2.13 m (7 ft 0 in)		41 – 26 August 1984
F	22	(Azerbaijan)	Caner-Medley, Nik	2.03 m (6 ft 8 in)	104 kg (229 lb)	42 – 20 October 1983
F	23	(United States)	Milbourne, Landon	2.01 m (6 ft 7 in)	95 kg (209 lb)	39 – 29 June 1987
SF	31	(Greece)	Giannopoulos, Charis	2.01 m (6 ft 7 in)		37 – 13 July 1989
PF	34	(United States)	Jefferson, Cory	2.06 m (6 ft 9 in)	99 kg (218 lb)	35 – 26 December 1990
C	44	(Jamaica)	Jordan, Jerome	2.13 m (7 ft 0 in)	115 kg (254 lb)	39 – 29 September 1986
F/C	50	(Nigeria)	Eric, Micheal	2.11 m (6 ft 11 in)	109 kg (240 lb)	38 – 24 June 1988
G	99	(United States)	Triche, Brandon	1.93 m (6 ft 4 in)	95.4 kg (210 lb)	35 – 21 February 1991

Head coach

Dimitris Liogas

- (Greece) vacant

Legend

- (C) Team captain
- Injured

- Roster
Updated: 2016-7-29

== Notable players ==
Note: Flags indicate national team eligibility at FIBA-sanctioned events. Players may hold other non-FIBA nationalities not displayed.

Criteria

To appear in this section a player must have either:

- Set a club record or won an individual award while at the club
- Played at least one official international match for their national team at any time
- Played at least one official NBA match at any time.

- Markos Kolokas
- Ioannis Psathas
- Dimitrios Kompodietas
- Vangelis Karampoulas
- Dimitrios Tsaldaris
- Nikos Liakopoulos
- Nikos Barlos
- Michalis Kakiouzis
- Dimitrios Mavroeidis
- Panagiotis Kafkis
- Leonidas Kaselakis
- Andreas Glyniadakis
- Nikos Gkikas
- Linos Chrysikopoulos
- Panagiotis Vasilopoulos
- Saša Vasiljević
- Nikola Pešaković
- Uroš Duvnjak
- Petar Popović
- Ogo Adegboye
- Patrick Ewing Jr.
- Tony Crocker
- Darrius Garrett
- Justin Jackson
- Cade Davis
- Dustin Hogue
- Muhammad El-Amin
- Roscoe Smith
- Robert Lowery
- Xavier Silas
- Tony Woods

== Head coaches ==
- Ilias Papatheodorou
