= Esperos Kallitheas B.C. =

Esperos Kallitheas
- Founded: 1945
- History: 1945 – Present
- Location: Kallithea, Athens, Greece
- Team colors: blue and white
- Website: esperos.com
Home	Away

Old P.O.K. Esperos logo.

Esperos Kallitheas B.C. is the men's basketball section of the Greek multi-sports club of Esperos Kallitheas (full name: POK Esperos/Panathlitikos Omilos Kallitheas Esperos). The basketball club was founded in 1945, two years after the establishment of the parent athletic club. The club has played six times in the top-tier level Greek Basket League, (the last time was in the 1999–2000 season).

== History ==
Esperos Basketball Club was founded in 1945, thanks to the efforts of Takis Kontouzoglou. In the 1972–73 season, they played for first time in the top-tier level Greek first division. They also played in the Greek first division in another 5 seasons (in the 1978–79, 1980–81, 1982–83, 1989–90, and 1999–2000 seasons), making it six seasons in total that they played in Greece's first division, counting the 1972–73 season.

Esperos also won the Greek 2nd division championship once, in the 1998–99 season, and they have also won four Greek B League championships (Greek 3rd-tier), in 1978, 1980, 1982, and 1987.

== Notable players ==
Note: Flags indicate national team eligibility at FIBA-sanctioned events. Players may hold other non-FIBA nationalities not displayed.

Criteria

To appear in this section a player must have either:

- Set a club record or won an individual award while at the club
- Played at least one official international match for their national team at any time
- Played at least one official NBA match at any time.

- (Greece) Liveris Andritsos
- (Greece) Dimitris Dimakopoulos
- (Greece) Makis Nikolaidis
- (Greece) Dimitrios Marmarinos
- (Greece) Giannis Giannoulis
- (Greece) Alekos Petroulas
- (Greece) Dimitrios Katiakos
- (Greece) Spyros Magkounis
- (Greece) Nikos Michalos
- (United States) Roy Tarpley
- (United States) Alvin Young

== Head coaches ==
- (Greece) Minas Gekos
- (Greece) Antonis Mantzaris

== Women's team ==
Esperos also had a women's basketball team. The women's team was the original founder of the successful club Esperides Kallitheas, that was founded in 1995.

In 2012, Esperides women's club merged with Ikaros Kallitheas, and ended its individual existence, however Esperides subtracted Ikaros' name in the recent years.

Esperos re-established women's team in 2023 and is playing in ESKANA Regional Α League.
