= 2016–17 Greek A2 Basket League =

Greek A2 Basket League
- Season: 2017–18
- Teams: 16

Regular season
- Promoted: Panionios; Faros Keratsiniou

Finals
- Champions: Panionios (3rd title)

The 2016–17 Greek A2 Basket League was the 31st season of the Greek A2 Basket League, the second-tier level professional club basketball league in Greece. It was the competition's second season with the participation of 16 teams. Playoff and play out games were held, for a second consecutive season. Panionios were crowned the league champions and were promoted to the 2017–18 Greek Basket League, along with playoff winners Faros Keratsiniou.

== Teams ==
2016–17 Greek A2 Basket League season club locations.

Club	Home city	Arena	Capacity
AEL	Larissa	Larissa Neapolis Indoor Arena	4,000
Aiolos Astakos	Astakos	Astakos Municipal Sports Center	500
Amyntas	Dafni-Ymittos, Dafni, Athens	Pyrkal Ymittos Indoor Hall	600
Arkadikos	Tripoli	Tripoli Indoor Hall	1,000
Doukas	Marousi, Athens	Dais Gymnasium	1,200
Ethnikos Piraeus	Piraeus, Athens	Panagiotis Salpeas Hall	1,000
Faros Keratsiniou	Keratsini, Piraeus, Athens	Pantelis Nikolaidis Indoor Hall	1,000
Gymnastikos S. Larissas	Larissa	Larissa Neapolis Indoor Arena	4,000
Holargos	Cholargos, Athens	Antonis Tritsis Indoor Hall	1,665
Iraklio	Heraklion	Heraklion Indoor Sports Arena	5,222
Iraklis Thessaloniki	Thessaloniki	Ivanofeio Sports Arena	2,500
Kavala	Kavala	Kalamitsa Indoor Hall	1,650
Machites Doxas Pefkon	Pefka, Thessaloniki	DAK Pefkon	350
Pagrati	Pangrati, Athens	METS Indoor Hall	1,200
Panionios	Nea Smyrni, Athens	Nea Smyrni Indoor Hall	1,832
Psychiko	Psychiko, Athens	Psychiko Indoor Hall	300

== Standings ==
Pos	Club	Pts	Pld	W	L	PF	PA	Diff	Qualification or Relegation	Refs.
1.	Panionios	56	30	26	4	2333	1970	+363	Promoted to Greek Basket League	
2.	Iraklis Thessaloniki	56	30	26	4	2324	2098	+226	Playoff	
3.	Doukas	55	30	25	5	2435	2114	+321	Playoff	
4.	Faros	54	30	24	6	2731	2229	+502	Playoff	
5.	Aiolos Astakos	49	30	19	11	2290	2100	+190	Playoff	
6.	Holargos	47	30	17	13	2336	2168	+168		
7.	Ethnikos Piraeus	46	30	16	14	2330	2307	+23		
8.	Amyntas	45	30	15	15	2119	2119	0		
9.	Psychiko	44	30	14	16	2213	2195	18		
10.	AEL	42	30	12	18	2203	2279	-76		
11.	Arkadikos	42	30	12	18	2187	2248	-61	Play Out	
12.	Machites Doxas Pefkon	40	30	10	20	2152	2268	-116	Play Out	
13.	Kavala	40	30	10	20	2053	2199	-146	Play Out	
14.	Iraklio	37	30	7	23	2023	2371	-348	Play Out	
15.	Gymnastikos S. Larissas	35	30	5	25	2067	2466	-399	Relegation to Greek B League (Beta Ethniki)	
16.	Pagrati	32	30	2	28	2078	2743	-665	Relegation to Greek B League (Beta Ethniki)	

== Postseason ==
=== Playoffs ===
Semifinals
2	Iraklis Thessaloniki	2
5	Aiolos Astakos	1
3	Doukas	0
4	Faros	2

Finals
2	Iraklis Thessaloniki	0
4	Faros	2

=== Play Out ===
- Arkadikos – Iraklio 2–0
- Machites Doxas Pefkon – Kavala 2–1

== Final league standings ==
Position	Team	Qualification or Relegation
1.	Panionios	Promotion to Greek Basket League
2.	Faros Keratsiniou; *The team merged with G.S. Larissas	Promotion to Greek Basket League
3.	Iraklis Thessaloniki	
4.	Doukas	
5.	Aiolos	
6.	Holargos	
7.	Ethnikos Piraeus	
8.	Amyntas	
9.	Psychiko	
10.	AEL	
11.	Arkadikos	
12.	Machites Doxas Pefkon	
13.	Kavala	Relegation to Greek B League (Beta Ethniki)
14.	Iraklio	Relegation to Greek B League (Beta Ethniki)
15.	Gymnastikos S. Larissas; *The team merged with Faros	Relegation to Greek B League (Beta Ethniki)
16.	Pagrati	Relegation to Greek B League (Beta Ethniki)

== See also ==
- 2016–17 Greek Basketball Cup
- 2016–17 Greek Basket League (1st tier)
