= Iraklio B.C. =

Iraklio OAA
- Leagues: Cretan Basket League
- Founded: 1968
- History: 1968–present
- Arena: Heraklion Indoor Sports Arena
- Capacity: 5,500
- Location: Heraklion, Crete, Greece
- Team colors: Blue and White
- President: Michalis Delakis
- Head coach: Giorgos Makrakis
- Championships: 1 Greek A2 Championship; 1 Greek B Championship; 1 Greek C Championship; 4 Cretan Championships
- Website: irakliooaa.gr
Home	Away

Iraklio OAA B.C. (Greek: Ηράκλειο OAA KAE), also known simply as Iraklio, or Heraklion, is a Greek professional basketball club that is based in the city of Heraklion, on the island of Crete, in Greece. It is a department of the Heraklion Tennis and Team Sports Club (Greek: Όμιλος Αντισφαιρίσεως και Αθλοπαιδιών - OAA - «Ηράκλειο»), a multi-sport club established in Heraklion in 1928. The club's basketball department was founded in 1968, and currently competes in the Cretan Basket League, hosting its home games at the Heraklion Indoor Sports Arena, a multi-purpose indoor arena with a capacity of 5,500 spectators. Irakleio is considered the most successful basketball club in Heraklion, being the sole club to have represented the city in the top-tier Greek Basket League, as well as the most successful club on the island of Crete, at least until the rise of the Rethymno Cretan Kings in the early 2010s. Iraklio OAA further administers competitive departments for tennis, table tennis and chess.

== History ==
=== Creation ===
Iraklio OAA was established in 1928, primarily operating as a tennis club. In 1968, under president Giorgos Deligiannakis, the club decided to expand its activities thus founding team sports departments for basketball and volleyball, reinstating its defunct table tennis department, as well as establishing competitive chess and bridge departments. The first coach of the basketball department was Michalis Dardantakis, who was replaced by Kostas Rigas shortly thereafter.

In 1973, Iraklio was promoted to the Greek B Basket League, where it kept playing for 5 straight seasons, until 1978, when it was relegated to the local Cretan Championship. After a dormant period spanning almost nine years, in which the club played in local competitions, an organized effort was made by newly appointed General Manager Manolis Papakaliatis to return to national competitions. Within just seven years, Iraklio achieved multiple promotions. In the 1993–94 season, the club competed in the Greek A2 Basketball League for the first time in its history. The very next season, Iraklio finished 2nd in the league, thus managing promotion to the A1 Greek Basket League, the top tier of the Greek basketball league system, becoming the first Cretan club to achieve this feat.

=== 1995–2003: Domestic success and European outings ===
Iraklio lived its glory days during the mid 90s, when the club was promoted to the A1 Greek Basket League. Despite being relegated in its inaugural season in the league, the club instantly returned to top-flight after winning the 1996–97 A2 Championship. The next season saw the club finishing in 8th place during regular season, thus clinging to a spot in the Greek basketball playoffs. They beat traditional Greek basketball powerhouse Aris in both games of their first round playoff series, thus finishing seventh overall in the league, which to this day still remains the best season performance in the history of the club. To accomplish this feat, Iraklio had one of the most impressive home records (13–2) at the end of the 1997–98 season, which propelled them towards their first ever European competition appearance. Iraklio consequently played in the 1998–99 FIBA Korać Cup, where they managed to reach the Round of 32. The club upheld a competitive profile throughout its next seasons in the Greek Basket League by managing to sign former NBA veterans into its rosters, most notably Oliver Miller (22nd overall pick in the 1992 NBA draft ) for the 1998–99 season and Willie Burton (9th overall pick in the 1990 NBA draft) in 1999–2000. Iraklio peaked its domestic performance during the 2002–03 season, notably managing to reach the Greek Basketball Cup Final Four (eventually placing in 4th place in the competition).

At the end of the 2003–04 season, Iraklio lost its place in the Greek Basket League finishing in 13th place, thus being relegated to the A2 Championship after seven consecutive seasons in top-flight. Throughout the season, Iraklio won only 7 games, six of which during the First Round, while going on a 13-game losing streak which spanned from 13 December 2003 to 2 May 2004. At the end of the season, the club tied in 12th place with Ionikos Nea Filadelfeia, both having 33 points on the Table, yet Iraklio was eventually relegated in head-to-head ranking (having lost to Ionikos 94−87 in overtime).

== Arenas ==
Irakleio previously used the 1,500 seat Lido Indoor Hall as its home arena. It currently uses the 5,500 seat Heraklion Indoor Sports Arena as its home arena. The 2,400 seat TEI Indoor Sports Hall is also available for the club to use, if needed.

== Titles and honors ==
- Greek 2nd Division Champion (1):
  - 1997

== Roster ==
Note: Flags indicate national team eligibility at FIBA-sanctioned events. Players may hold other non-FIBA nationalities not displayed.

Iraklio B.C. roster
Players
Coaches

Pos.	No.	Nat.	Name	Ht.	Wt.	Age
PG		(Greece)	Papadakis, Miron	1.83 m (6 ft 0 in)
G		(Greece)	Tserkitsoglou, Prodromos	1.87 m (6 ft 2 in)
PG		(Greece)	Maragakis, Pantelis	1.85 m (6 ft 1 in)
PF		(Greece)	Panou, Spyros	2.04 m (6 ft 8 in)		34 – 7 June 1992
PF		(Greece)	Lolas, Dimitris	2.03 m (6 ft 8 in)		39 – 31 December 1986
F		(Greece)	Lianos, Giannis	2.02 m (6 ft 8 in)		41 – 8 July 1985
F		(Greece)	Petrakis, Alexandros	2.02 m (6 ft 8 in)		39 – 11 April 1987
F		(Greece)	Pallis, Kostas	2.00 m (6 ft 7 in)		46 – 1 August 1979
C	12	(Serbia)	Latović, Damir	2.04 m (6 ft 8 in)	110 kg (243 lb)	46 – 10 July 1980

Head coach

Vassilis Rallis

Legend

- (C) Team captain
- Injured

- Roster
Updated: 21/09/2016

== Notable players ==
Note: Flags indicate national team eligibility at FIBA-sanctioned events. Players may hold other non-FIBA nationalities not displayed.

Criteria

To appear in this section a player must have either:

- Set a club record or won an individual award while at the club
- Played at least one official international match for their national team at any time
- Played at least one official NBA match at any time.

Greece:

- Marios Batis
- Christos Charissis
- Georgios Gasparis
- Fotis Katsikaris
- Jon Korfas
- Nikos Liakopoulos
- Dimitris Lolas
- Christos Myriounis
- Alfa Ntiallo
- Pete Papachronis
- Argiris Papapetrou
- Ioannis Sioutis
- Vangelis Sklavos

Europe:

- Frederick Forte

Africa:

- Samir Gouda

USA:

- Doremus Bennerman
- Willie Burton
- James Forrest
- Derrick Hamilton
- Antonio Harvey
- Oliver Miller
- Dyron Nix
- Jimmy Oliver
- Richard Rellford
- Carl Thomas

Rest of Americas:

- Andrés Guibert
- José Piculín Ortiz

== Head coaches ==
- Vojislav Vezović
- Georgios Kalafatakis
- Vangelis Alexandris
- Georgios Bartzokas
