= Greek Elite League =

Second-tier men's basketball league in Greece

Elite League
- Founded: 1986; 40 years ago
- First season: 1986–87
- Country: Greece
- Confederation: FIBA
- Number of teams: 16
- Level on pyramid: 2
- Promotion to: Greek Basketball League
- Relegation to: Greek National League 1
- Domestic cup: Greek Cup
- Current champions: Doxa Lefkadas (1st title)
- Most championships: Papagou (3 titles); Sporting (3 titles); Peristeri (3 titles); Apollon Patras (3 titles)
- Website: www.eliteleague.gr

The Greek Elite League (Greek: Ελληνική Ελίτ Λιγκ), is a professional basketball league in Greece. It is the second-tier level of pro competition among clubs in the country. It is organized by the Hellenic Basketball Federation.

== History ==
In the 1986–87 season, the current format for Greek professional basketball, consisting of the A1 National Category and the A2 National Category was formed.

Starting with the 2015–16 season, playoffs were added between the 2nd and 5th placed teams for promotion to the first tier level Greek Basketball League (GBL), and a one-game play-out was added to decide relegation to the third tier level Greek B Basket League.

- 1986–87 to 2022–23: Greek A2 National Division
- 2023–24 to present: Greek Elite League

== Promotion and relegation ==
At the end of each season, the following promotion and relegation takes place:

- The top two teams in the A2 are promoted to the Greek Basketball League.
- These teams are replaced by the bottom two teams from the Greek Basketball League.
- The bottom four teams in the A2 are relegated to the Greek B Basket League.
- These teams are replaced by the top four teams in the Greek B Basket League.

== Title holders (1986–87 to 2025–26) ==
- 1986–87 Panellinios
- 1987–88 Sporting
- 1988–89 Peristeri
- 1989–90 Papagou
- 1990–91 Sporting
- 1991–92 Apollon Patras
- 1992–93 Papagou
- 1993–94 Ampelokipoi
- 1994–95 Papagou
- 1995–96 Peiraikos
- 1996–97 Iraklio
- 1997–98 Near East
- 1998–99 Dafni
- 1999–2000 Makedonikos
- 2000–01 KAOD
- 2001–02 Makedonikos
- 2002–03 Apollon Patras
- 2003–04 Panellinios
- 2004–05 Kolossos Rodou
- 2005–06 Olympias Patras
- 2006–07 Sporting
- 2007–08 Trikala 2000
- 2008–09 Peristeri
- 2009–10 Ikaros Kallitheas
- 2010–11 KAOD
- 2011–12 Panelefsiniakos
- 2012–13 Nea Kifissia
- 2013–14 AEK
- 2014–15 Kavala
- 2015–16 Kymis
- 2016–17 Panionios
- 2017–18 Peristeri
- 2018–19 Ionikos Nikaias
- 2019–20 Charilaos Trikoupis
- 2020–21 Apollon Patras
- 2021–22 ASK Karditsas
- 2022–23 Maroussi
- 2023–24 Milon
- 2024–25 Mykonos
- 2025–26 Doxa Lefkadas

== Champions and runners-up ==
Season	Champion	Runner-up
1986–87	Panellinios	Pagrati
1987–88	Sporting	Philippos Thessaloniki
1988–89	Peristeri	Pagrati
1989–90	Papagou	Philippos Thessaloniki
1990–91	Sporting (2x)	Dafni
1991–92	Apollon Patras	Peiraikos Syndesmos
1992–93	Papagou (2x)	Milon
1993–94	Ampelokipoi	Sporting
1994–95	Papagou (3x)	Irakleio
1995–96	Peiraikos	VAO
1996–97	Irakleio	Dafni
1997–98	Near East	Maroussi
1998–99	Dafni	Esperos Kallitheas
1999–2000	Makedonikos	Milon
2000–01	KAOD	Ionikos N.F.
2001–02	Makedonikos (2x)	Olympia Larissa
2002–03	Apollon Patras (2x)	Palaio Faliro
2003–04	Panellinios (2x)	MENT
2004–05	Kolossos Rodou	Gymnastikos S. Larissas
2005–06	Olympias Patras	Aigaleo
2006–07	Sporting (3x)	Kolossos Rodou
2007–08	Trikala 2000	Panorama
2008–09	Peristeri (2x)	Ilysiakos
2009–10	Ikaros Kallitheas	Iraklis Thessaloniki
2010–11	KAOD (2x)	Rethymno Aegean
2011–12	Panelefsiniakos	Apollon Patras
2012–13	Nea Kifissia	Aries Trikala
2013–14	AEK Athens	Koroivos
2014–15	Kavala	Arkadikos
2015–16	Kymis	Faros Keratsiniou
2016–17	Panionios	Faros Keratsiniou
2017–18	Peristeri (3x)	Holargos
2018–19	Ionikos Nikaias	Iraklis Thessaloniki
2019–20	Charilaos Trikoupis	Diagoras Dryopideon
2020–21	Apollon Patras (3x)	Olympiacos B
2021–22	ASK Karditsas	Psychiko
2022–23	Maroussi	Triton Athens
2023–24	Milon	Panionios
2024–25	Mykonos	Iraklis Thessaloniki
2025–26	Doxa Lefkadas	Vikos Falcons Ioannina

== Titles by club ==
Club	Titles	Years
Sporting	3	1987–88, 1990–91, 2006–07
Papagou	3	1989–90, 1992–93, 1994–95
Peristeri	3	1988–89, 2008–09, 2017–18
Apollon Patras	3	1991–92, 2002–03, 2020–21
Panellinios	2	1986–87, 2003–04
Makedonikos	2	1999–2000, 2001–02
KAOD	2	2000–01, 2010–11
Ampelokipoi	1	1993–94
Peiraikos	1	1995–96
Iraklio	1	1996–97
Near East	1	1997–98
Dafni	1	1998–99
Kolossos Rodou	1	2004–05
Olympias Patras	1	2005–06
Trikala 2000	1	2007–08
Ikaros Kallitheas	1	2009–10
Panelefsiniakos	1	2011–12
Nea Kifissia	1	2012–13
AEK	1	2013–14
Kavala	1	2014–15
Kymis	1	2015–16
Panionios	1	2016–17
Ionikos Nikaias	1	2018–19
Charilaos Trikoupis	1	2019–20
ASK Karditsas	1	2021–22
Maroussi	1	2022–23
Milon	1	2023–24
Mykonos	1	2024–25
Doxa Lefkadas	1	2025–26

== Greek A2 League MVP award (official) ==
(as awarded by the InfoBasket.gr coach's poll)

MVP	Team	Season
(Greece) Vangelis Karampoulas	Ikaros Kallitheas	2009–10
(Greece) Sakis Giannakopoulos	Lavrio	2010–11
(Greece) Nikos Argyropoulos	Apollon Patras	2011–12
(Greece) Vangelis Karampoulas (2x)	AENK	2012–13
(Greece) Sakis Karidas	Koroivos	2013–14
(Greece) Ioannis Gagaloudis	Livadeia	2014–15
(Greece) Stavros Toutziarakis	Kymis	2015–16
(Greece) Vangelis Karampoulas (3x)	Faros Keratsini	2016–17
(Bulgaria) Kee Kee Clark	Peristeri	2017–18

== Eurobasket.com Player of the Year (unofficial) ==
(as awarded by the website Eurobasket.com)

Player of the Year	Team	Season
(Greece) Dimos Dikoudis	Olympia Larissa	1996–97
(Greece) Dimos Dikoudis (2x)	Olympia Larissa	1997–98
(Greece) Theo Papaloukas	Dafni	1998–99
(Greece) Kostas Charalampidis	Makedonikos	1999–2000
(Greece) Kostas Sdrakas	KAOD	2000–01
(Greece) Kostas Charalampidis (2x)	Makedonikos	2001–02
(Greece) Nikos Argyropoulos	Apollon Patras	2002–03
(Greece) Kostas Christou	MENT	2003–04
(Greece) Vangelis Karampoulas	Sporting	2004–05
(Greece) Vassilis Symtsak	Doukas	2005–06
(Greece) Dimitrios Spanoulis	Xanthi	2006–07
(Greece) Nikos Kaklamanos	Trikala 2000	2007–08
(Greece) Apostolos Koutroulias	Near East	2008–09
(Greece) Nikos Liakopoulos	Peramatos Ermis	2009–10
(Greece) Sakis Giannakopoulos	Lavrio	2010–11
(Greece) Nikos Argyropoulos (2x)	Apollon Patras	2011–12
(Greece) Vangelis Karampoulas (2x)	AENK	2012–13
(Greece) Petros Noeas	Koroivos	2013–14
(Greece) Ioannis Dimakos	Psychiko	2014–15
(Greece) Stavros Toutziarakis	Kymis	2015–16
(Greece) Ioannis Gagaloudis	Iraklis	2016–17
(Bulgaria) Kee Kee Clark	Peristeri	2017–18
(Greece) Loukas Mavrokefalidis	Ionikos Nikaias	2018–19
(Greece) Stathis Papadionysiou	Charilaos Trikoupis	2019–20
(Greece) Ioannis Bourousis	Karditsas	2021–22
(United States) Ronaldo Segu	Psychiko	2022–23
(United States) Zack Bryant	Ermis Shimatariou	2023–24

== Top Scorer by points per game ==
Top Scorer	Team	Season
(Belgium) Daren Queenan	Apollon Patras	1999–2000
(Greece) Giannis Manos	Sporting	2000–01
(Greece) Nikos Michalos	Milon	2001–02
(Greece) Alexis Kyritsis	Papagou	2002–03
(Greece) Vassilis Moulakis	MENT	2003–04
(Greece) Vangelis Karampoulas	Sporting	2004–05
(Croatia) Ivan Mimica	MENT	2005–06
(Greece) Dimitrios Spanoulis	Xanthi	2006–07
(Greece) Dimos Fotiou	Sporting	2007–08
(Greece) Apostolos Koutroulias	Near East	2008–09
(Greece) Nikos Liakopoulos	Peramatos Ermis	2009–10
(Greece) Ioannis Kakiouzis	Lavrio	2010–11
(Greece) Alex Stevović	AEK Argous	2011–12
(Greece) Georgios Anagnostopoulos	Ermis Lagkada	2012–13
(Greece) Nikos Pettas	Psychiko	2013–14
(Greece) Ioannis Dimakos	Psychiko	2014–15
(Greece) Ioannis Gagaloudis	Livadeia	2015–16
(Greece) Alexis Kyritsis (2×)	Doukas	2016–17
(Greece) Alexis Kyritsis (3×)	Doukas	2017–18
(Greece) Loukas Mavrokefalidis	Ionikos Nikaias	2018–19
(Greece) Nikos Liakopoulos (2×)	Diagoras Dryopideon	2019–20
(Greece) Alexis Kyritsis (4×)	Psychiko	2020–21
(Greece) Igor Cvorovic	Oiakas Nafpliou	2021–22

== See also ==
- Greek Basketball League
- Greek Cup
- Greek B Basket League
- Greek C Basket League
- HEBA Greek All-Star Game
- HEBA
