= Greek B Basket League =

Third-tier men's basketball league in Greece

National League 1
- Formerly: Greek National B Class Championship (1973–1986)
- Sport: Basketball
- Founded: 1973
- No. of teams: 39
- Country: Greece
- Continent: (European Union) Europe
- Most recent champions: Egaleo; Sofades; Machites Peiramatiko
- Level on pyramid: 2nd-Tier (1973–1986); 3rd-Tier (1986–present)
- Promotion to: Greek Elite League
- Relegation to: Greek National League 2
- Related competitions: Greek Cup
- Website: www.basket.gr

The Greek B Basket League, or Greek B Basketball League (Greek: Ελληνική Β Μπασκετ Λιγκ), is a national basketball league in Greece. It is the 3rd-tier level of the basketball league system in Greece, and was founded in its current form in 1986. It is also known as National League 1. It is organized by the Hellenic Basketball Federation (E.O.K.).

Originally, the league began in 1973, as the Greek National B Class Championship, and it was the 2nd-tier level of Greek basketball until 1986, when it was replaced in that capacity by the Greek A2 Basket League.

The Greek B Basket League was originally held under a league format of two groups. From 1986 to 2012, the league was held under a one group league format. From 2013 to 2010, it was again held under a two group format. Under the current league format, a total of 39 clubs take part, which are separated into three groups that are based on geographical criteria.

== Champions ==
=== First Two groups period (2nd-tier level) ===
Season	1st Group	2nd Group
1973–74	Panionios	Dimokritos Thessaloniki
1974–75	Ionikos Nikaias	Iraklis
1975–76	Apollon Patras	Dimokritos Thessaloniki
1976–77	Maroussi	HAN Thessaloniki
1977–78	Esperos	Iraklis
1978–79	Apollon Patras	VAO
1979–80	Esperos	Gymnastikos S. Larissas
1980–81	Panionios	VAO
1981–82	Esperos	Pierikos
1982–83	Peristeri	VAO
1983–84	Sporting	Niki Volos

=== Four Groups period (2nd-tier level) ===
Season	1st Group	2nd Group	3rd Group	4th Group
1984–85	Ilysiakos	Near East	MENT	Thyella Serron
1985–86	Ilysiakos	Milon	Philippos Thessaloniki	PAO Dioikitiriou

=== One group period (3rd-tier level) ===
Season	Winner
1986–87	Esperos
1987–88	Proteas Athens
1988–89	Papagou
1989–90	Nestor Thessaloniki
1990–91	MENT
1991–92	Irakleio
1992–93	Ampelokipoi
1993–94	Ionikos NF
1994–95	Near East
1995–96	Olympia Larissa
1996–97	Makedonikos
1997–98	Arion Athens
1998–99	KAOD

Season	Winner
1999–00	Aias Evosmou
2000–01	Chalkida
2001–02	Ilysiakos
2002–03	Xanthi
2003–04	Aigaleo
2004–05	Rethymno
2005–06	Palaio Faliro
2006–07	Peristeri
2007–08	Near East
2008–09	Amyntas Athens
2009–10	Lavrio
2010–11	OFI
2011–12	Aiolos Trikalon

=== Two groups period (3rd-tier level) ===
Season	1st Group	2nd Group
2012–13	Psychiko	Filippos Verias
2013–14	Aetos	Doxa Lefkadas
2014–15	Kymis	Promitheas Patras
2015–16	Panionios	Aiolos Astakou
2016–17	Peristeri	Kastorias
2017–18	Ionikos Nikaias	Kavala
2018–19	Oiakas Nafplio	Anatolia Thessaloniki
2019–20	Panerythraikos	PAS Giannina BC

=== Four groups period (3rd-tier level) ===
Season	1st Group	2nd Group	3rd Group	4th Group
2020–21	interrupted due to the outbreak of the COVID-19 pandemic			
2021–22	Papagou	Megarida	Ermis Schimatari	Aias Evosmos B.C.
2022–23	Milon Nea Smyrni	Panionios	Vikos Ioannina	Makedonikos

=== Three groups period (3rd-tier level) ===
Season	1st Group	2nd Group	3rd Group
2023–24	Proteas Voula	Near East	HAN Thessaloniki
2024–25	Egaleo	Sofades	Machites Peiramatiko
