= 2013–14 AEK Athens B.C. season =

AEK
2013–14 season
- Head coach: (Greece) Vangelis Ziagkos
- Greek 2nd Division: 1st
- Greek Cup: First Round

In the 2013–14 season, AEK played in the Greek A2 Division. At the finish of the season, AEK was the winner of the league's championship, and got promoted back to the top-tier level Greek Basket League, after 3 years of absence in that league. AEK had a record 23 wins and 3 losses in the A2 League (Greek 2nd Division). AEK also participated in the Greek Cup, where it was disqualified early on in the competition.

== Roster ==
AEK Athens B.C. 2013–2014 roster
Players
Coaches

Pos.	No.	Nat.	Name	Ht.	Wt.	Age
C	4	(Greece)	Tsiakos, Georgios	2.06 m (6 ft 9 in)	110 kg (243 lb)	43 – 19 July 1982
SG	5	(Greece)	Papadionysiou, Stathis	1.95 m (6 ft 5 in)	90 kg (198 lb)	34 – 1 January 1992
PG	6	(Greece)	Falekas, Alexis	1.90 m (6 ft 3 in)	93 kg (205 lb)	49 – 1 August 1976
PF	7	(Greece)	Papantonakos, Kostas	2.05 m (6 ft 9 in)	102 kg (225 lb)	34 – 19 July 1991
SG	8	(Greece)	Polytarchou, Michalis	1.90 m (6 ft 3 in)	103 kg (227 lb)	42 – 23 June 1983
PF	11	(Greece)	Gizogiannis, Andronikos	2.03 m (6 ft 8 in)	110 kg (243 lb)	43 – 8 February 1983
SF	12	(Greece)	Karampoulas, Vangelis	2.00 m (6 ft 7 in)	100 kg (220 lb)	44 – 18 November 1981
PG	13	(Greece)	Tsiotras, Thodoris	1.90 m (6 ft 3 in)	100 kg (220 lb)	39 – 1 January 1987
SF	14	(Greece)	Drosos, Vangelis	2.00 m (6 ft 7 in)	100 kg (220 lb)	32 – 23 June 1993
C	15	(Greece)	Despos, Dimitris	2.10 m (6 ft 11 in)	102 kg (225 lb)	50 – 30 March 1976
PG	16	(Greece)	Panagiotaras, Spyros	1.80 m (5 ft 11 in)	80 kg (176 lb)	32 – 23 June 1993
SF	17	(Greece)	Stoukas, Giannis	2.01 m (6 ft 7 in)	90 kg (198 lb)	34 – 23 June 1991
PF	18	(Greece)	Zeginoglou, Nikos	2.02 m (6 ft 8 in)	100 kg (220 lb)	36 – 23 June 1989
PG		(Serbia)	Nikolić, Stefan	1.91 m (6 ft 3 in)	86 kg (190 lb)	37 – 13 August 1988

Head coach

- (Greece) Vangelis Ziagkos

Assistant coach(es)

- (Greece) Panagiotis Chatzieleftheriou
- (Greece) Achilleas Demenagas

Legend

- (C) Team captain
- Injured

- Roster
Updated: August 22, 2013

=== Depth chart ===
Pos.	Starting 5	Bench 1	Reserve
C	Georgios Tsiakos	Dimitris Despos
PF	Andronikos Gizogiannis	Kostas Papantonakos	Nikos Zeginoglou
SF	Vangelis Karampoulas	Vangelis Drosos	Giannis Stoukas
SG	Michalis Polytarchou	Thodoris Tsiotras	Stathis Papadionysiou
PG	Alexis Falekas	Stefan Nikolić	Spyros Panagiotaras

== Technical and medical staff & academies staff ==
Technical staff
Head coach	(Greece) Vangelis Ziagkos
Assistant coach	(Greece) Panagiotis Chatzieleftheriou
Assistant coach	(Greece) Achilleas Demenagas
Physical fitness coach	(Greece) Dimitris Mpompas
General manager	(Greece) Giorgos Berkovich
Department head	(Greece) Dimos Dikoudis
Team manager	(Greece) Giorgos Chinas
Caregiver	(Greece) Giorgos Stathopoulos
Medical staff
Head of medical department	(Greece) Ioannis Chatzikomninos
Physiotherapist	(Greece) Manolis Petropoulos
Physiotherapist	(Greece) Nael Chrysafidis
Academies staff
General manager	(Greece) Achilleas Demenagas
Academies director	(Greece) Vangelis Dermanoutsos
A.E.K. B' coach	(Greece) Vangelis Tsepelis
Physical fitness coach	(Greece) Konstantinos Chatzichristos
Juniors coach	(Greece) Charis Vourdoumpas

== Friendlies ==
30 August 2013 Friendly	(Greece) Apollon Arxeas Korinthou	50–71	(Greece) AEK Athens	Korinthos
18.00 UTC +2				Attendance: In camera

4 September 2013 Friendly	(Greece) Near East	60–87	(Greece) AEK Athens	Kaisariani
18.00 UTC +2

6 September 2013 Friendly	(Greece) Lavrio	65–72	(Greece) AEK Athens	Lavrio
18.30 UTC +2

7 September 2013 Friendly	(Greece) Agia Paraskevi	66–82	(Greece) AEK Athens	Agia Paraskevi
18.00 UTC +2

21 September 2013 Friendly	(Greece) AEK Athens	81–61	(Greece) Ethnikos Pireus	Ano Liosia
14.00 UTC +2

24 September 2013 Friendly	(Greece) Ikaros Chalkidas	92–79	(Greece) AEK Athens	Chalkida
18.30 UTC +2

27 September 2013 Friendly	(Greece) AEK Athens	68–53	(Greece) Filathlitikos	Athens
18.00 UTC +2

28 September 2013 Friendly	(Greece) Peristeri	67–66	(Greece) AEK Athens	Athens
20.00 UTC +2

5 October 2013 Friendly	(Greece) Maroussi	64–87	(Greece) AEK Athens	Maroussi
16.30 UTC +2

15 November 2013 Friendly	(Greece) Amyntas Dafnis	80–79	(Greece) AEK Athens	Dafni
18.00 UTC +2

== Competitions ==
=== Greek A2 Basket League ===
==== Results summary ====
Wins
23
Losses
3

12 October 2013 1	(Greece) OFI Crete	56–78	(Greece) AEK Athens	Heraklion
17.00 UTC +2

19 October 2013 2	(Greece) AEK Athens	88–59	(Greece) Pagrati	Ano Liosia
17.00 UTC +2

26 October 2013 3	(Greece) Kavala	66–72	(Greece) AEK Athens	Kavala
17.00 UTC +2

2 November 2013 4	(Greece) AEK Athens	86–65	(Greece) Agia Paraskevi	Ano Liosia
17.00 UTC +2

9 November 2013 5	(Greece) Ermis Lagkada	59–67	(Greece) AEK Athens	Thessaloniki
17.00 UTC +2

23 November 2013 6	(Greece) AEK Athens	69–59	(Greece) Arkadikos	Ano Liosia
17.00 UTC +2

9 November 2013 7	(Greece) Ikaroi Serron	51–78	(Greece) AEK Athens	Serres
17.00 UTC +2

7 December 2013 8	(Greece) AEK Athens	80–68	(Greece) Lavrio	Ano Liosia
17.00 UTC +2

14 December 2013 9	(Greece) Koroivos Amaliadas	82–67	(Greece) AEK Athens	Amaliada
17.00 UTC +2

4 January 2014 10	(Greece) AEK Athens	87–63	(Greece) Filathlitikos	Ano Liosia
17.00 UTC +2

11 January 2014 11	(Greece) Iraklis	51–73	(Greece) AEK Athens	Thessaloniki
17.00 UTC +2

18 January 2014 12	(Greece) AEK Athens	72–67	(Greece) Filippos Veria	Ano Liosia
17.00 UTC +2

25 January 2014 13	(Greece) Psychiko	82–76	(Greece) AEK Athens	Athens
17.00 UTC +2

1 February 2014 14	(Greece) AEK Athens	78–74	(Greece) OFI Crete	Ano Liosia
17.00 UTC +2

15 February 2014 15	(Greece) Pagrati	69–75	(Greece) AEK Athens	Athens
17.00 UTC +2

22 February 2014 16	(Greece) AEK Athens	64–63	(Greece) Kavala	Ano Liosia
17.00 UTC +2

1 March 2014 17	(Greece) Agia Paraskevi	72–95	(Greece) AEK Athens	Athens
17.00 UTC +2

8 March 2014 18	(Greece) AEK Athens	81–56	(Greece) Ermis Lagkada	Ano Liosia
17.00 UTC +2

15 March 2014 19	(Greece) Arkadikos	61–76	(Greece) AEK Athens	Tripoli, Greece
17.00 UTC +2

22 March 2014 20	(Greece) AEK Athens	76–67	(Greece) Ikaroi Serron	Ano Liosia
17.00 UTC +2

29 March 2014 21	(Greece) Lavrio	66–74	(Greece) AEK Athens	Lavrio
17.00 UTC +2

5 April 2014 22	(Greece) AEK Athens	60–67	(Greece) Koroivos Amaliadas	Ano Liosia
17.00 UTC +2

12 April 2014 23	(Greece) Filathlitikos	61–67	(Greece) AEK Athens	Athens
17.00 UTC +2

27 April 2014 24	(Greece) AEK Athens	78–69	(Greece) Iraklis	Ano Liosia
17.00 UTC +2

3 May 2014 25	(Greece) Filippos Veria	55–70	(Greece) AEK Athens	Veria
17.00 UTC +2

10 May 2014 26	(Greece) AEK Athens	81–68	(Greece) Psychiko	Ano Liosia
17.00 UTC +2

=== Greek Cup ===
14 September 2013 1st round	(Greece) Koroivos Amaliadas	86–80	(Greece) AEK Athens	Amaliada
17.00 UTC +2

== Sources ==
- Greek Basketball Federation Standings and results
- sentragoal.gr Results of A2
