= Stefan Đorđević (basketball, born 1989) =

Serbian basketball player

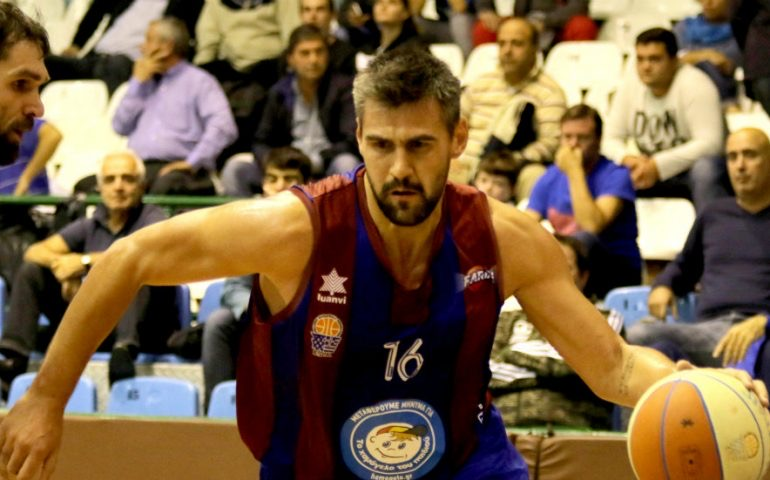
- Đorđević in action with Faros Keratsiniou.

Esperos Lamias
- Position: Center
- League: Greek A2

Personal information
- Born: 12 March 1989 (age 37) Kruševac, FR Yugoslavia
- Listed height: 6 ft 9 in (2.06 m)
- Listed weight: 243 lb (110 kg)

Career information
- NBA draft: 2011: undrafted
- Playing career: 2007–present

Career history
- 2007–2008: Mega Aqua Monta
- 2007–2008: →Kotež
- 2008–2009: Ulcinj
- 2009–2010: Teodo Tivat
- 2010–2012: Torrelodones
- 2012–2013: Smederevo 1953
- 2013: Teodo Tivat
- 2013–2014: OFI
- 2014–2015: Arkadikos
- 2015–2016: Doukas
- 2016–2017: Faros Keratsiniou
- 2017: Spars Sarajevo
- 2017–2018: ASK Karditsas
- 2018–2019: Charilaos Trikoupis
- 2019–2020: Oiakas Nafpliou
- 2020–2021: Radnički Kragujevac
- 2021–2022: Zdravlje
- 2022–present: Esperos Lamias

Career highlights
- Greek 2nd Division Top Scorer (2019)

Stefan Đorđević (Serbian Cyrillic: Стефан Ђорђевић, born 12 March 1989) is a Serbian professional basketball player for Esperos Lamias of the Greek A2 Basket League.

== Professional career ==
In Poland, Đorđević played with Unia Tarnów in Poland. In Montenegro, he played with Ulcinj and Teodo Tivat. In Serbia, Djordjević played with Mega Aqua Monta and Smederevo 1953.

In 2013, Đorđević signed with the Greek club OFI. With OFI, Đorđević averaged 19.9 points and 7.1 rebounds per game. He finished second in points and seventh in rebounds, in the Greek 2nd Division's 2013–14 season.

In the 2014–15 season, Đorđević played with the Greek 2nd Division club Arkadikos. In the 2015–16 season, Đorđević played with the Greek 2nd Division club Doukas.

== National team career ==
Đorđević was a member of the Serbia and Montenegro national under-16 team at the 2005 FIBA Europe Under-16 Championship.
