= Lampropoulos =

Lampropoulos (Greek: Λαμπρόπουλος) is a Greek surname. Notable people with the surname include:

- Andreas Lampropoulos (born 1988), Greek footballer
- Fotios Lampropoulos (born 1983), Greek basketball player
- Georgios Lampropoulos (born 1984), Greek footballer
- Vasilios Lampropoulos (born 1990), Greek footballer
