= Stefan Đorđević =

Stefan Đorđević may refer to:

== Basketball ==
- Stefan Đorđević (basketball, born 1989), Serbian basketball player (Crvena zvezda, Greece, Montenegro, Poland, Radnički Kragujevac)
- Stefan Đorđević (basketball, born 1998), Serbian basketball player (Vršac, FMP)

== Football ==
- Stefan Đorđević (footballer, born 1990), Montenegrin association football forward
- Stefan Đorđević (footballer, born 1991), Serbian association football defender
- Stefan Đorđević (footballer, born 1994), Serbian association football goalkeeper
