= Devin Cannady =

American basketball player (born 1996)

- Cannady in 2026

No. 30 – Mykonos
- Position: Point guard / shooting guard
- League: Greek Basketball League

Personal information
- Born: May 21, 1996 (age 30) Mishawaka, Indiana, U.S.
- Listed height: 6 ft 2 in (1.88 m)
- Listed weight: 183 lb (83 kg)

Career information
- High school: Marian (Mishawaka, Indiana)
- College: Princeton (2015–2019)
- NBA draft: 2019: undrafted
- Playing career: 2019–present

Career history
- 2019–2020: Long Island Nets
- 2021: Lakeland Magic
- 2021: Orlando Magic
- 2021–2022: Lakeland Magic
- 2022: Orlando Magic
- 2022–2023: South Bay Lakers
- 2023–2024: Birmingham Squadron
- 2024–2025: Panionios
- 2025–present: Mykonos

Career highlights
- NBA G League champion (2021); NBA G League Finals MVP (2021); Second-team All-Ivy League (2018)
- Stats at NBA.com
- Stats at Basketball Reference

Devin Cannady (born May 21, 1996) is an American professional basketball player for Mykonos of the Greek Basketball League. He played college basketball for the Princeton Tigers.

== Early life ==
Cannady was introduced to basketball by his father, a former college player, who showed him tapes of Michael Jordan. He grew up playing Amateur Athletic Union basketball for MBA Select. Cannady played for Marian High School in Mishawaka, Indiana. As a junior, he averaged 21.9 points, 4.8 rebounds, 3.3 assists, and 2.9 steals per game. After the season, Cannady joined Spiece Indy Heat at the Nike Elite Youth Basketball League (EYBL), leading his team to the EYBL Finals at the Peach Jam. He finished high school as the winningest player in Marian history and ranked second in career points, with 1,475. He also played the quarterback position on Marian's football team for four years and was a two-time all-state selection. Cannady was considered a three-star basketball recruit by 247Sports and Rivals and committed to play college basketball for Princeton over several other NCAA Division I offers.

== College career ==
Cannady averaged 11.6 points and 2.5 rebounds per game as a freshman, helping the team reach the NIT. During his sophomore season, Cannady helped Princeton go undefeated in Ivy League play, win the inaugural Ivy League basketball tournament, and participate in the 2017 NCAA tournament. He averaged 13.4 points, 3.6 rebounds and 1.9 assists per game, earning Honorable Mention All-Ivy League honors. On February 16, 2018, Cannady scored a career-high 32 points in a 107–101 triple-overtime loss to Cornell. As a junior, Cannady averaged 16.7 points and 5.4 rebounds per game on a team that finished 13–16. He was named to the All-Ivy League Second Team.

On January 18, 2019, Cannady was arrested, but his aggravated assault charge was downgraded to a disorderly persons offense and he was sentenced to community service. Cannady was suspended from Princeton and began seeing a therapist to manage anxiety. He reinstated by the team on February 8 against Yale and played four games before announcing on March 1 that he was ending his season due to a personal matter. In 16 games, he averaged 18.2 points, 5.8 rebounds and 1.7 assists per game during his senior season. Cannady finished his career with 1,515 points, the fifth highest in Princeton history.

== Professional career ==
=== Long Island Nets (2019–2020) ===
After going undrafted in the 2019 NBA draft, Cannady joined the Oklahoma City Thunder at 2019 NBA Summer League. On October 15, 2019, he signed with the Brooklyn Nets of the NBA, four days before being waived by the team prior to the regular season. On October 27, Cannady was allocated to Brooklyn's NBA G League affiliate, the Long Island Nets. During Cannady's rookie season, he had to balance playing professional basketball with completing his sociology degree from Princeton. On December 27, he scored a career-high 33 points along with eight rebounds and three assists in a 109–95 win over the Erie BayHawks. Through 40 games with Long Island in the 2019–20 season, Cannady averaged 14.4 points, 3.9 rebounds and 2.6 assists per game.

=== Lakeland Magic (2021) ===
On November 27, 2020, Cannady signed with the Orlando Magic, but was later waived by the Magic on December 19 after appearing in two preseason games.

On January 24, 2021, Cannady was included in roster of the Lakeland Magic where he played in 13 games and averaged 11.7 points, 2.8 rebounds and 2.7 assists in 25.8 minutes, while shooting .400 from three-point range. The Lakeland Magic won the G League championship in the shortened single-site 2021 season in Orlando and Cannady was named the championship game most valuable player after scoring 22 points in the final.

=== Orlando Magic (2021) ===
On April 6, Orlando signed Cannady to a 10-day contract, but on April 13, he was waived after three games. Three days later, he signed a two-way contract with the Magic. On April 25, Cannady suffered a compound fracture to his right ankle during a 131–112 loss to the Indiana Pacers. On May 4, he was waived by Orlando.

=== Return to Lakeland (2021–2022) ===
On October 12, 2021, Cannady signed with Orlando for his second stint with the team. However, he was waived three days later. Cannady subsequently rejoined the Lakeland Magic.

=== Return to Orlando (2022) ===
On March 31, 2022, Cannady signed a 10-day contract with the Orlando Magic and on April 10, he signed for the rest of the season.

Cannady was waived prior to the start of the 2022–23 season.

=== South Bay Lakers (2022–2023) ===
On November 3, 2022, Cannady was named to the opening-night roster for the South Bay Lakers.

=== Birmingham Squadron (2023–2024) ===
On September 28, 2023, Cannady signed with the New Orleans Pelicans, but was waived the same day. On October 29, he signed with the Birmingham Squadron.

=== Panionios (2024–2025) ===
On August 10, 2024, Cannady signed with Panionios of the Greek Basketball League.

=== Mykonos BC (2025–present) ===
On July 26, 2025, Cannady signed with Mykonos BC of the Greek Basketball League. On June 11, 2026, he renewed for one more season.

== Career statistics ==
Legend
| GP | Games played | GS | Games started | MPG | Minutes per game |
| FG% | Field goal percentage | 3P% | 3-point field goal percentage | FT% | Free throw percentage |
| RPG | Rebounds per game | APG | Assists per game | SPG | Steals per game |
| BPG | Blocks per game | PPG | Points per game | **Bold** | Career high |

=== Regular season ===
| Year | Team | GP | GS | MPG | FG% | 3P% | FT% | RPG | APG | SPG | BPG | PPG |
|---|---|---|---|---|---|---|---|---|---|---|---|---|
| 2020–21 | Orlando | **8** | 0 | 9.3 | **.393** | .375 | **.857** | .6 | .1 | .6 | .1 | 4.3 |
| 2021–22 | Orlando | 5 | 0 | **29.0** | .341 | **.405** | .714 | **1.2** | **2.0** | **1.0** | **.6** | **10.0** |
| Career | | 13 | 0 | 16.8 | .361 | .396 | .786 | .8 | .8 | .8 | .3 | 6.5 |

=== College ===
| Year | Team | GP | GS | MPG | FG% | 3P% | FT% | RPG | APG | SPG | BPG | PPG |
|---|---|---|---|---|---|---|---|---|---|---|---|---|
| 2015–16 | Princeton | 29 | 0 | 22.0 | **.485** | **.456** | .889 | 2.5 | 1.2 | 1.1 | .2 | 11.6 |
| 2016–17 | Princeton | **30** | 24 | 31.5 | .416 | .409 | **.938** | 3.6 | **1.9** | 1.1 | **.3** | 13.4 |
| 2017–18 | Princeton | 29 | **28** | 36.7 | .452 | .394 | .884 | 5.4 | 1.7 | .8 | .1 | 16.7 |
| 2018–19 | Princeton | 16 | 15 | **36.8** | .416 | .360 | .869 | **5.8** | 1.7 | **1.6** | .2 | **18.2** |
| Career | | 104 | 67 | 31.1 | .441 | .403 | .896 | 4.1 | 1.6 | 1.1 | .2 | 14.6 |

== Personal life ==
Cannady's father, Tony, played college basketball for Bethel College.

He married WNBA player Katie Lou Samuelson on April 22, 2023. Samuelson revealed on February 10, 2023, via Instagram that she and Cannady were expecting a baby, and their daughter was born on August 4.
