= D. J. Funderburk =

American basketball player (born 1997)

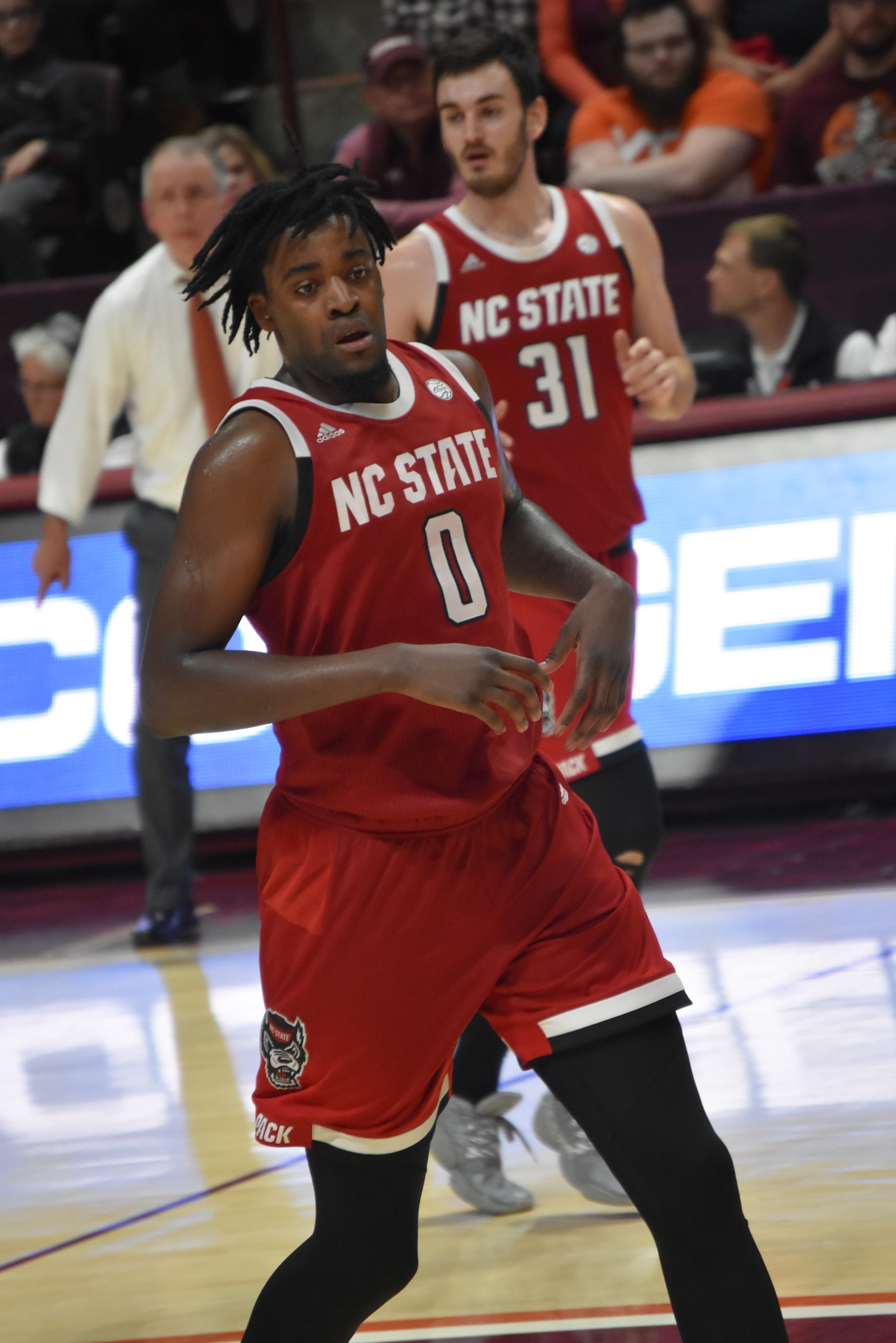

No. 0 – Mykonos
- Position: Center / power forward
- League: Greek Basketball League

Personal information
- Born: 12 April 1997 (age 29) Cleveland Heights, Ohio, U.S.
- Listed height: 6 ft 10 in (2.08 m)
- Listed weight: 225 lb (102 kg)

Career information
- High school: St. Edward (Lakewood, Ohio); Hargrave Military Academy (Chatham, Virginia)
- College: Northwest Florida State (2017–2018); NC State (2018–2021)
- NBA draft: 2021: undrafted
- Playing career: 2021–present

Career history
- 2021–2022: Avtodor
- 2022: Paris Basketball
- 2022–2023: Reggiana
- 2023: Hapoel Eilat
- 2023–2024: Split
- 2024–2025: Włocławek
- 2025–2026: Iraklis Thessaloniki
- 2026–present: Mykonos

Career highlights
- All-PLK Team (2025)

Derek Funderburk Jr. (born April 12, 1997) is an American-Lebanese professional basketball player for Mykonos of the Greek Basketball League. He played college basketball for the Northwest Florida State Raiders and the NC State Wolfpack. He has also participated in the NBA Summer League with the Utah Jazz.

== High school career ==
Funderburk attended St. Edward High School. As a junior, he averaged 14.2 points and 6.7 rebounds per game to help lead St. Edwards to the 2015 Division I State Final Four. He transferred to Hargrave Military Academy for his senior season, playing under coach A. W. Hamilton and alongside future NC State teammate Braxton Beverly. Funderburk averaged 18 points, nine rebounds and three assists per game and helped the Tigers to a Prep School National Championship and a 47–1 record. Funderburk was ranked the No. 77 overall recruit in the class of 2016. He committed to Ohio State.

== College career ==
Funderburk redshirted his freshman season at Ohio State. He transferred to Northwest Florida State College and averaged 11.5 points, 5.0 rebounds and 1.7 assists per game as a redshirt freshman, shooting 51.1 percent from the field. Funderburk transferred to NC State. Funderburk averaged 8.8 points and 4.2 rebounds per game as a redshirt sophomore. He was suspended for violating team policy in September 2019. Funderburk was charged with larceny property damage by university police after driving off with two car boots, damaging the boots and the concrete surface in the parking lot. On December 29, 2019, he scored a career-high 22 points in a 72–60 win against Appalachian State. As a redshirt junior, Funderburk averaged 12.8 points and 6.1 rebounds per game. Following the season, he declared for the 2020 NBA draft, but ultimately opted to return to NC State. Funderburk missed a game against Syracuse on January 31, 2021, due to a violation of university policy. As a senior, he averaged 12.6 points and 5.6 rebounds per game. Following the season, Funderburk declared for the 2021 NBA draft and signed with an agent, forgoing the additional season of eligibility the NCAA granted due to the COVID-19 pandemic.

== Professional career ==
After going undrafted in the 2021 NBA draft, Funderburk signed with the Utah Jazz for Summer League play.

On August 27, 2021, Funderburk signed his first professional contract with the Russian team Avtodor of the VTB United League. He left the team after the 2022 Russian invasion of Ukraine. Funderburk averaged 10.7 points and 2.6 rebounds per game. On March 16, 2022, Funderburk signed with Paris Basketball of the LNB Pro A for the rest of the season.

On July 12, 2022, Funderburk signed with Promitheas Patras of the Greek Basket League and the EuroCup. On September 3, 2022, Funderburk mutually parted ways with the Greek club without appearing in a single official game with the team. On the same day, he signed with Reggio Emilia of the Italian Lega Basket Serie A (LBA).

On November 14, 2022, he signed with Hapoel Eilat of the Israeli Basketball Premier League. On July 28, 2024, he signed with Anwil Włocławek of the Polish Basketball League (PLK). On June 26, 2025, Funderburk signed a one-year contract with Iraklis of the Greek Basketball League.

On July 11, 2026, Funderburk signed with Mykonos BC of the Greek Basketball League.

== Personal life ==
Funderburk is the son of Caren Crew and Derek Funderburk.

== Career statistics ==
Legend
GP	Games played	GS	Games started	MPG	Minutes per game
FG%	Field goal percentage	3P%	3-point field goal percentage	FT%	Free throw percentage
RPG	Rebounds per game	APG	Assists per game	SPG	Steals per game
BPG	Blocks per game	PPG	Points per game	**Bold**	Career high

=== College ===
==== NCAA Division I ====
Year	Team	GP	GS	MPG	FG%	3P%	FT%	RPG	APG	SPG	BPG	PPG
2016–17	Ohio State	Redshirt										
2018–19	NC State	**36**	1	19.9	.552	**.269**	.785	4.2	**.4**	.5	**1.1**	8.8
2019–20	NC State	30	**15**	26.0	**.609**	.222	.760	**6.1**	.3	**.9**	.8	**12.8**
2020–21	NC State	21	13	**26.2**	.562	.200	**.792**	5.6	.3	.7	.5	12.6
Career		87	29	23.5	.577	.237	.778	5.2	.4	.7	.8	11.1

==== JUCO ====
Year	Team	GP	GS	MPG	FG%	3P%	FT%	RPG	APG	SPG	BPG	PPG
2017–18	Northwest Florida State	34	33	27.5	.511	.279	.743	5.0	1.7	1.2	.5	11.5
