= Dimitris Despos =

Greek professional basketball player

Dimitris Despos Δημήτρης Δέσπος
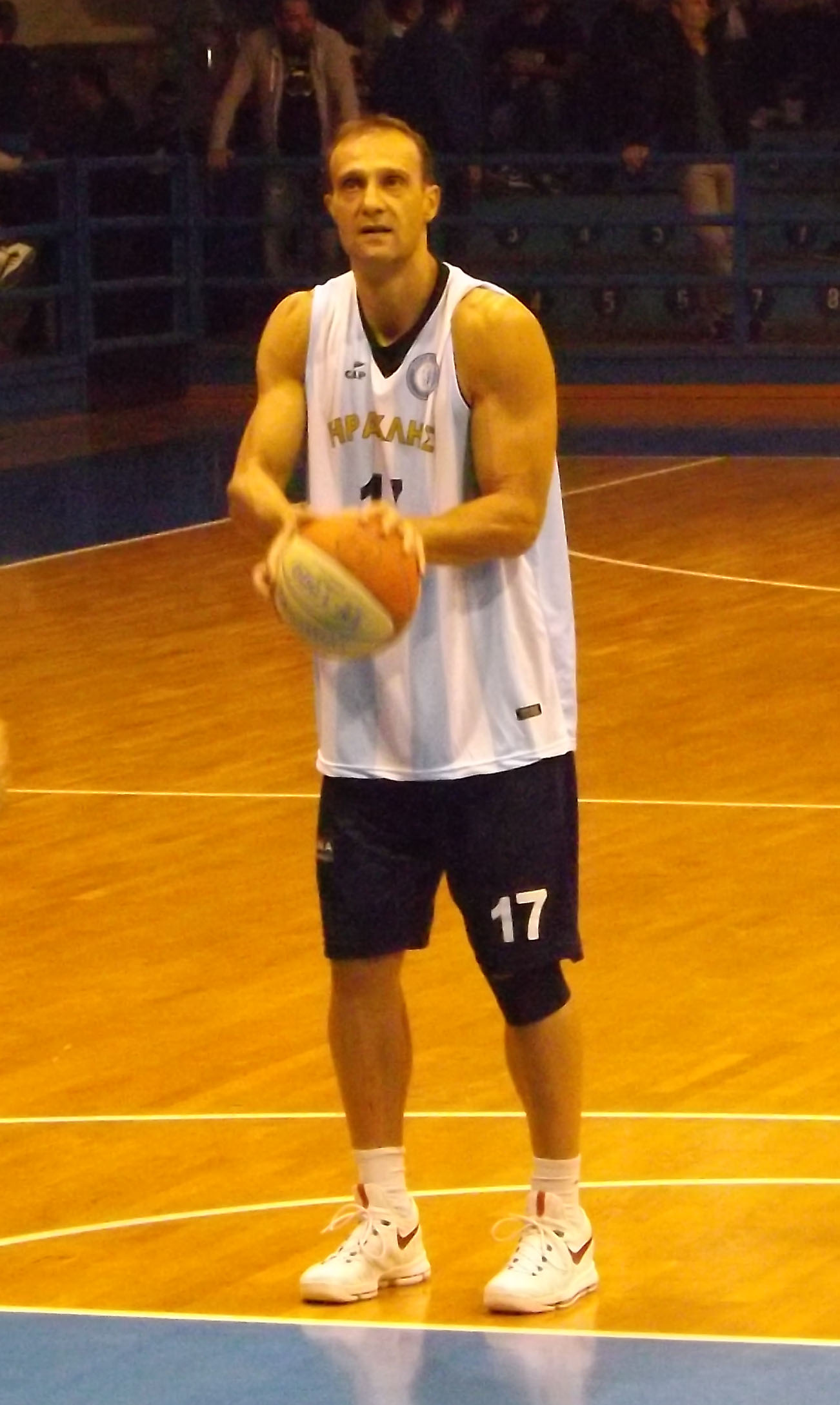
- Despos playing for Iraklis Thessaloniki, in 2016.

No. 17 – AO Trikala B.C.
- Position: Center

Personal information
- Born: March 30, 1976 (age 50) Larissa, Greece
- Listed height: 2.10 m (6 ft 11 in)
- Listed weight: 109 kg (240 lb)

Career information
- Playing career: 1994–present

Career history
- 1994–1996: GS Larissa
- 1996–1999: PAOK Thessaloniki
- 1999–2000: GS Larissa
- 2000–2001: MENT
- 2001–2004: Makedonikos
- 2005–2006: Maroussi
- 2006–2008: MENT
- 2008–2009: Peristeri
- 2009–2011: Iraklis Thessaloniki
- 2011–2014: AEK Athens
- 2014—2017: Iraklis Thessaloniki
- 2018–2020: Farsala BC
- 2020–2022: Aiolos
- 2022–2023: Trikala B.C.
- 2024–: AO Trikala BC

Career highlights
- Greek Cup winner (1999); 3× Greek 2nd Division champion (2002, 2009, 2014)
Medals
Men's basketball
Representing Greece
FIBA Europe Under-16 Championship
Gold medal – first place	1993 Turkey	Under-16
FIBA Under-19 World Cup
Gold medal – first place	1995 Greece	Under-19

Dimitrios "Dimitris" Despos (Greek: Δημήτρης Δέσπος, Greek pronunciation: [ði'mitɾis 'ðespos]; born March 30, 1976) is a Greek professional basketball player. Despos has spent his entire playing career in the Greek professional leagues. He also represented Greece at the youth levels and won the gold medal in the 1993 FIBA Europe Under-16 Championship and the 1995 FIBA Under-19 World Cup. At a height of 2.10 m (6 ft 10 3/4 in) tall, he plays at the center position.

== Professional career ==
Despos started playing basketball in the amateur club, Ikaroi Trikala, of his hometown, before moving to GS Larissa in 1994. In the 2007–08 season, while with MENT, Despos lead the Greek 2nd Division in rebounds, with 279 in 30 games. In July 2008, he signed with Peristeri. In 2011, Despos signed with AEK. He stayed with the team for three years, helping them to gain a league promotion to the Greek top-tier level. In September 2014, he signed with Iraklis of the Greek A2 (2nd Division). In a game against Filippos Veria, Despos exceeded 3,000 career points scored in the Greek 2nd Division.

In September 2016, Iraklis announced that Despos would play for the team in the 2016–17 season.

== National team career ==
Despos represented the Greek Under-16 junior national team at the 1993 FIBA Europe Under-16 Championship, where Greek the team won the gold medal. He was also a member of the Greek Under-19 junior national team that won the gold medal at the 1995 FIBA Under-19 World Cup. During the tournament, he appeared in 4 games, averaging 2.5 points and 2.8 rebounds per game. Despos represented Greece at the youth levels in 91 games, averaging 4.8 points per game.
