= Jermaine Love =

American basketball player (born 1989)

- Love in 2026

No. 22 – Mykonos
- Position: Shooting guard / point guard
- League: Greek Basketball League

Personal information
- Born: March 27, 1989 (age 37) Chicago Heights, Illinois, U.S.
- Listed height: 6 ft 3 in (1.91 m)
- Listed weight: 186 lb (84 kg)

Career information
- High school: Rich East (Park Forest, Illinois)
- College: Prairie State College (2008–2010); Illinois-Springfield (2010–2012)
- NBA draft: 2012: undrafted
- Playing career: 2013–present

Career history
- 2013–2014: Palanga
- 2014–2015: MRU Perlas
- 2015–2016: Lietkabelis Panevėžys
- 2016–2017: Nevėžis Kėdainiai
- 2017–2018: Trefl Sopot
- 2018–2019: Holargos
- 2019–2020: Scaligera Verona
- 2020: Kolossos Rodou
- 2020: Hapoel Holon
- 2020–2022: PAOK Thessaloniki
- 2022–2023: Nizhny Novgorod
- 2023: Élan Chalon
- 2023–2024: Peristeri
- 2024–2025: Büyükçekmece Basketbol
- 2025–2026: Esenler Erokspor
- 2026–present: Mykonos

Career highlights
- All-VTB United League Second Team (2023); Russian Cup winner (2023); Second-team All-GLVC (2012)

Jermaine Love-Roberts (born March 27, 1989) is an American professional basketball player who plays for Mykonos B.C. of the Greek Basketball League. A 6'3", 186 lbs combo guard, Love played for Prairie State College (where he became the school's first All-America selection in men's basketball) and at the University of Illinois at Springfield, before going overseas to Lithuania, to play for Palanga and Vilnius of the National Basketball League.

== High school ==
Love attended Rich East High School, in Park Forest, Illinois, where he played high school basketball. He earned All-Conference honors in basketball at Rich East, and was also a member of the conference champions in track and field as well.

== College career ==
Love played college basketball at the Prairie State College, from 2008 to 2010 and at the Illinois-Springfield from 2010 to 2012. As a senior, he averaged 16.5 points, 4.8 rebounds, and 1.7 assists per game.

== Professional career ==
=== Perlas Vilnius (2014–2015) ===
On September 27, 2014, Love joined MRU Vilnius in Lithuania.

=== Lietkabelis Panevėžys (2015–2016) ===
On August 24, 2015, Love moved to the Lithuanian First Division, after he signed with Lietkabelis Panevėžys.

=== Nevėžis (2016–2017) ===
On August 12, 2016, Love moved to Nevėžis.

=== Trefl Sopot (2017–2018) ===
The next year, after a successful tryout, he joined Trefl Sopot of the PLK. With Trefl Sopot, he went on to average 13.6 points, 3.3 rebounds and 3 assists per game.

=== Holargos (2018–2019) ===
On July 4, 2018, Love joined Holargos of the Greek Basket League.

=== Scaligera Verona (2019–2020) ===
Love started the 2019–20 campaign with the Italian 2nd Division club Scaligera Verona. However, he left the club in January.

=== Kolossos Rodou (2020) ===
Love returned to Greece, and signed with Kolossos Rodou, on January 22, 2020, replacing the injured Donovan Jackson.

=== Hapoel Holon (2020) ===
Love finished out the 2019–20 season with the Israeli Super League club Hapoel Holon, with which he averaged 11.9 points, 3.1 rebounds and 2.6 assists per game.

=== PAOK Thessaloniki (2020–2022) ===
On July 31, 2020, Love signed with PAOK Thessaloniki of the Greek Basket League. On July 3, 2021, Love renewed his contract with the Greek club. During the 2021–22 campaign, in a total of 22 domestic Greek league games, he averaged 14 points, 2.8 rebounds, 2.5 assists and 1 steal, while playing around 27 minutes per contest. He also served as the team's captain.

=== Peristeri (2023–2024) ===
On December 18, 2023, Love returned to Greece, signing with Peristeri of the Basketball Champions League.

=== Büyükçekmece Basketbol (2024–2025) ===
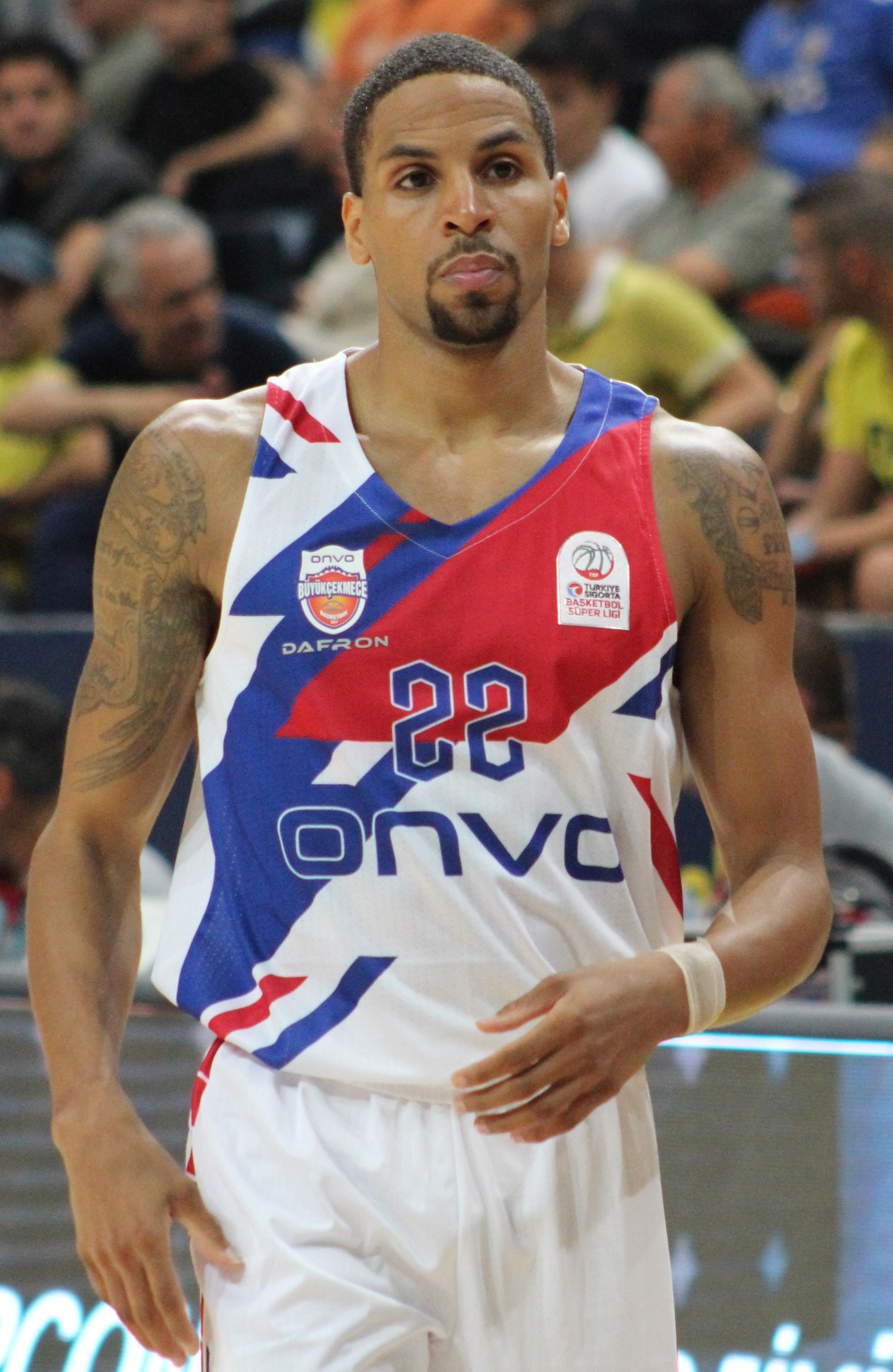
Love with Büyükçekmece Basketbol in 2024

On July 30, 2024, he signed with Büyükçekmece Basketbol of the Basketbol Süper Ligi (BSL).

On October 15, 2024, Love was awarded the Hoops Agents Player of the Week award for Round 2. He had 30 points, 3 rebounds and 7 assists for his team to beat Türk Telekom B.K..

=== Esenler Erokspor (2025–2026) ===
On July 12, 2025, he signed with Esenler Erokspor of the Basketbol Süper Ligi (BSL).
