= Khalid Moore =

American basketball player (born 2000)

No. 2 – ASK Karditsa
- Position: Power forward
- League: Greek Basketball League

Personal information
- Born: July 29, 2000 (age 26) Mineola, New York, U.S.
- Listed height: 6 ft 7 in (2.01 m)
- Listed weight: 207 lb (94 kg)

Career information
- High school: Archbishop Molloy (Queens, New York)
- College: Georgia Tech (2018–2022); Fordham (2022–2023)
- NBA draft: 2023: undrafted
- Playing career: 2023–present

Career history
- 2023–2024: Lavrio
- 2024–2025: Saint-Quentin
- 2025–2026: Mykonos
- 2026–present: ASK Karditsa

Career highlights
- Third-team All-Atlantic 10 (2023)

Khalid Jahfari Moore (born July 29, 2000) is an American professional basketball player for ASK Karditsa of the Greek Basketball League (GBL). He played college basketball for Georgia Tech and Fordham.

== College career ==
Moore played four seasons with the Yellow Jackets of the Georgia Institute of Technology averaging 4.4 ppg, 2.5 rpg and 1 apg in 20.3 minutes per game. In the end of the fourth season he decided to enter the transfer platform of the NCAA, as a graduate, and ended up at the Fordham Rams. He played his last college basketball season, where he averaged 15.6 ppg, 6.7 rpg and 1.8 apg and was named to the All-Atlantic 10 third team.

== Professional career ==
After going undrafted at the 2023 NBA draft, Moore joined the New York Knicks for the 2023 NBA Summer League. He played four games, averaging 2.0 points, 2.2 rebounds and 1.0 assist per game.

=== Lavrio (2023–2024) ===
On August 18, 2023, Moore signed his first professional contract overseas in Greece with Lavrio of the Greek Basket League. He spent the whole 2023-24 season there playing as a starter, averaging 10.4 ppg, 6.4 rpg, 1.3 apg and 1.1 spg (steals per game).

He returned to the US to participate in the 2024 NBA Summer League, this time with the Brooklyn Nets.

=== Saint-Quentin (2024–2025) ===
On June 25, 2024, Moore moved to France and signed with Saint-Quentin of the LNB Élite. In his first season there he started 29 of his team's games, in all competitions, and averaged 6.1 ppg, 3.7 rpg and 0.9 apg.

=== Mykonos (2025–2026) ===
On June 30, 2025, Moore returned to Greece to play for Mykonos. On August 30, 2026, Moore re-signed for one more year.

=== Karditsa (2026–present) ===
On October 30, 2026, he signed with Karditsa until the end of the season.
