= Ronnie Harrell =

American basketball player (born 1996)

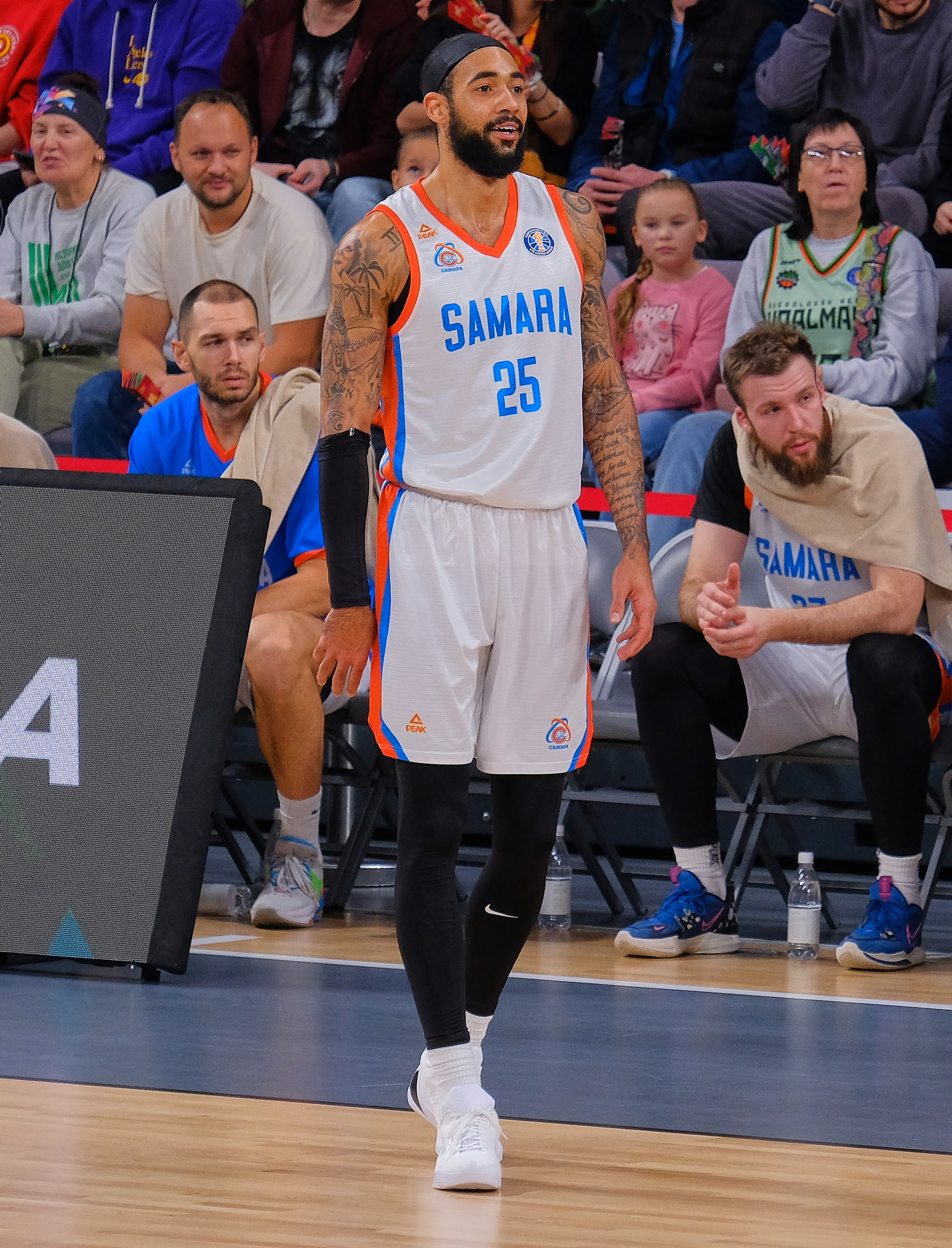
- Harrell with BC Samara in 2024

No. 25 – Mykonos
- Position: Small forward
- League: Greek Basketball League

Personal information
- Born: March 11, 1996 (age 30) Denver, Colorado, U.S.
- Listed height: 6 ft 7 in (2.01 m)
- Listed weight: 200 lb (91 kg)

Career information
- High school: East (Denver, Colorado)
- College: Creighton (2015–2018); Denver (2018–2019)
- NBA draft: 2019: undrafted
- Playing career: 2019–present

Career history
- 2019–2020: Steaua București
- 2020: Etzella
- 2020–2021: Palmer Alma Mediterrànea Palma
- 2021–2022: Hapoel Gilboa Galil
- 2022–2023: Ironi Ness Ziona
- 2023–2024: Aris Thessaloniki
- 2024: Samara
- 2024–2025: Maroussi
- 2025–2026: Aris Thessaloniki
- 2026–present: Mykonos

Career highlights
- EuroCup steals leader (2024); Summit League All-Newcomer Team (2019)

Ronnie Lee Harrell Jr. (born March 11, 1996) is an American professional basketball player for Mykonos of the Greek Basketball League. He previously played college basketball for Creighton University and the University of Denver. Harrell mainly plays at the small forward position.

== Early life ==
His parents are Ronnie and Shawn Harrell, and Tiffany Peterson, and he has eight siblings. Harrell is a cousin of former NBA guard and current coach Chauncey Billups. His nickname is "Slim". His hometown is Denver, Colorado. Growing up, he was a Denver Nuggets ball boy. He is 6 ft 7 in (201 cm), and weighs 200 pounds (91 kg).

== High school career ==
Harrell attended Denver East High School, where he played for the basketball team. He was 5' 8" as a high school freshman, but grew seven inches that summer, then grew another three inches after his sophomore year. As a junior, he averaged 13 points, 7.3 rebounds, and 2.1 steals per game.

As a senior, Harrell averaged 16.5 points, 8.0 rebounds, and 2.3 assists per game. He made 154 three-pointers in three seasons while shooting 39.6% from beyond the arc. He was named to the All-5A State Tournament Team as a senior, was a Denver Post All-Colorado selection, was ranked No. 71 on ESPN’s list of Top 100 recruits and a four-star recruit, and was ranked a three-star recruit by both Scout and Rivals.

== College career ==
Harrell first attended Creighton University, where he majored in journalism and played guard and forward for the Creighton Bluejays men's basketball team. He sat out the 2014–15 season as a redshirt. In 2015–16 he was a redshirt freshman, and averaged 3.2 points, 2.6 rebounds, and 1.0 assists per game off the bench. In 2016–17 as a sophomore, off the bench he averaged 2.6 points and 1.9 rebounds per game. In 2017–18 as a junior he averaged 6.2 points, 6.6 rebounds, and 2.9 assists per game as a starter, and 7.6 points, 5.9 rebounds, and 2.4 assists per game off the bench.

Harrell graduated and transferred to Denver for his senior season. In 2018–19, playing for the Pioneers he averaged 12.9 points (tied for 16th in the Summit League), 5.5 rebounds (12th), and 2.0 assists per game, with 189 defensive rebounds (10th), while shooting 40.9% from the field, 36.8% from the three point line, and 79.7% from the free-throw line (6th). He was named to the Summit League Preseason All-Newcomer Team and the Summit League All-Newcomer Team.

== Professional career ==
Harrell played in 2019–20 for Steaua in the Romanian Liga Națională and for Etzella in the Luxembourg Total League. He played in 2020–21 for Palmer Alma Mediterrànea Palma in the Spanish LEB Gold, averaging 16.1 points and 5.4 rebounds per game.

On August 6, 2021, Harrell signed with Hapoel Gilboa Galil of the Israeli Basketball Premier League.

On August 11, 2022, he signed with MHP Riesen Ludwigsburg of the Basketball Bundesliga (BBL). On September 23, his contract was terminated.

On October 11, 2022, he signed with Ironi Ness Ziona of the Israeli Basketball Premier League.

On August 9, 2023, Harrell signed with Greek club Aris.

After starting the 2024–25 campaign with the Russian club BC Samara, Harrell returned to Greece for Maroussi.

On July 24, 2026, Harrell signed with Greek club Mykonos BC.
