= Colin Slater (basketball) =

American basketball player

Niki Volos
- Position: Point guard
- League: Greek A2 Elite League

Personal information
- Born: October 29, 1997 (age 28) New Orleans, Louisiana, U.S.
- Listed height: 6 ft 1 in (1.85 m)
- Listed weight: 190 lb (86 kg)

Career information
- High school: Clovis North (Fresno, California); Immanuel (Reedley, California)
- College: Tulane (2016–2018); Long Beach State (2019–2022)
- NBA draft: 2022: undrafted
- Playing career: 2022–present

Career history
- 2022–2023: Bornova Belediyespor
- 2023: Korihait
- 2023–2024: Kožuv
- 2024: Gostivar
- 2024–2025: Mykonos
- 2025: Vikos Falcons
- 2025: Koroivos
- 2025–present: Niki Volos

Career highlights
- Big West Player of the Year (2022); First-team All-Big West (2022)

Colin Slater Jr. (born October 29, 1997) is an American basketball player. He played college basketball for the Long Beach State Beach and the Tulane Green Wave.

== High school career ==
Slater began his high school career at the Clovis North Educational Center. He subsequently transferred to Immanuel High School. Slater was named the 2015 Fresno Bee player of the year, leading Immanuel to a Central Section Division IV championship after scoring 20 points against William Howard Taft Charter High School. He committed to play college basketball at Tulane.

== College career ==
Slater played sparingly during two years at Tulane, averaging 2.7 points per game as a sophomore. He opted to transfer to Long Beach State and sat out the 2018-19 season as a redshirt. Slater averaged 10.2 points and 2.4 rebounds per game as a junior. He initially decided to opt-out of the 2020-21 season due to COVID-19 concerns but opted-in after the fall semester. Slater was named the 2022 Big West Player of the Year after helping lead Long Beach State to a regular season Big West title. He averaged 14.4 points and 2.8 rebounds per game.

== Professional career ==
On July 1, 2024, he joined Mykonos of the Greek A2 Elite League. He left Mykonos on January and moved to Vikos Ioannina.

On August 13, 2025, he moved to Koroivos.
