= Cole Syllas =

Greek Canadian basketball player (born 2000)

No. 16 – Iraklis Thessaloniki
- Position: Small forward
- League: Greek Basketball League; FIBA Europe Cup

Personal information
- Born: 1 August 2000 (age 26) Kingston, Ontario, Canada
- Listed height: 6 ft 5 in (1.96 m)
- Listed weight: 209 lb (95 kg)

Career information
- High school: La Salle (Kingston, Ontario)
- College: Queen's University (2019–2024)
- NBA draft: 2023: undrafted
- Playing career: 2023–present

Career history
- 2023: Ottawa BlackJacks
- 2024: Brampton Honey Badgers
- 2024–2025: Mykonos
- 2025: N.E. Megaridas
- 2025–present: Iraklis Thessaloniki

Cole–John Syllas (born August 1, 2000) is a Greek Canadian professional basketball player for Iraklis Thessaloniki of the Greek Basketball League (GBL) and the FIBA Europe Cup. Syllas played college basketball at the Queen's University at Kingston.

== College career ==
Born in Kingston, Ontario, Syllas played college basketball at Queen's University at Kingston. He stayed with Queen's for four years, being an important part of the team's squad.

== Professional career ==
After spending his two first years of his career in Canada with Ottawa BlackJacks and Brampton Honey Badgers, Syllas moved to Greece and joined Mykonos. On January 11, 2025, Syllas left Mykonos and joined Neaniki Estia Megaridas until the end of the season.

On June 16. 2025, Syllas signed a two-year contract with Iraklis of the Greek Basketball League.
