= Konstantinos Iatridis =

Greek basketball player

No. 20 – Mykonos
- Position: Power forward / center
- League: Greek Basketball League

Personal information
- Born: 14 October 2001 (age 25) Thessaloniki, Greece
- Listed height: 2.07 m (6 ft 9 in)

Career information
- Playing career: 2018–present

Career history
- 2018–2022: PAOK Thessaloniki
- 2021–2022: →Filippos Verias
- 2022–2023: Koroivos
- 2023–2024: Eleftheroupoli
- 2024–present: PAOK Thessaloniki
- 2026–present: →Mykonos

Konstantinos Iatridis (Greek: Κωνσταντίνος Ιατρίδης; born 14 October 2001) is a Greek professional basketball player for Mykonos of the Greek Basketball League (GBL), on loan from PAOK Thessaloniki.

A 2.07 m (6 ft 9 in) power forward and center, Iatridis began his senior career with PAOK before spending three seasons in Greece's second-tier Elite League with Filippos Verias, Koroivos and Eleftheroupoli. He returned to PAOK in 2024 and, in September 2026, extended his contract with the club through 2029 before joining Mykonos on loan for the 2026–27 season.

During the 2023–24 Elite League season with Eleftheroupoli, he was named the league's most valuable player of the sixth round and later shared the MVP award for the 19th round.

== Early life and youth career ==
Iatridis was born in Thessaloniki on 14 October 2001. He began playing basketball in the youth academy of EOS and later spent time with Makedonikos and Keravnos Oraiokastrou before joining the youth system of PAOK in 2014.

In 2017, he was a member of the PAOK under-16 side that won both the regional EKASTH championship and the Greek national under-16 championship.

== Professional career ==
=== PAOK ===
Iatridis made his senior debut for PAOK in the Greek Basketball League during the 2018–19 season, aged 17. On 14 October 2019, his 18th birthday, he signed his first professional contract with the club.

He made 11 senior appearances for PAOK through the end of the 2020–21 season.

=== Filippos Verias ===
In September 2021, PAOK loaned Iatridis to Filippos Verias for the 2021–22 season. He appeared in 30 league games, averaging 9.4 points, 5.4 rebounds, 1.1 assists and 1.3 blocks per game.

=== Koroivos ===
In August 2022, Iatridis joined Koroivos for the 2022–23 season.

He played in 33 games for Koroivos, averaging 7.6 points, 5.4 rebounds and one block per game. At the end of the season, Iatridis also received a vote from the league's head coaches in the voting for the Elite League's Best Young Player award.

=== Eleftheroupoli ===
Iatridis moved to Eleftheroupoli for the 2023–24 Elite League season. On 6 November 2023, he was named the league's MVP of the sixth round following Eleftheroupoli's 81–56 victory over Panerythraikos. In 24 minutes and 27 seconds, Iatridis recorded 26 points, 13 rebounds, two assists and two steals, shooting 5-of-5 from three-point range and registering a performance index rating of 39.

At that stage of the season, he was also leading the Elite League in total rebounds and was tied for the league lead in steals.

On 4 February 2024, Iatridis received his second round MVP distinction of the season, sharing the award for the 19th round with Gaios Skordilis. In Eleftheroupoli's 76–71 road victory over Papagou, Iatridis finished with 12 points, 10 rebounds, six assists, one steal and one block in 28 minutes, making four of his five three-point attempts.

Iatridis finished the 2023–24 season with averages of 6.9 points, 6.9 rebounds, 1.9 assists, one steal and 1.1 blocks across 33 games.

=== Return to PAOK ===
On 9 July 2024, Iatridis returned to PAOK, signing a three-year contract through 2027.

Ahead of the 2025–26 season, he and Nikos Persidis were the only two players retained from PAOK's previous roster amid a major rebuilding of the team.

During the 2025–26 GBL season, Iatridis appeared in 12 league games and averaged 2.5 points in 4.9 minutes per game.

On 19 September 2026, PAOK announced a two-year contract extension with Iatridis, keeping him under contract through the 2028–29 season. He was simultaneously loaned to Mykonos Betsson for the 2026–27 season.

== National team career ==
Iatridis has represented Greece at the youth international level. In the summer of 2021, he was a member of the Greece under-20 national team at the FIBA U20 European Challenger in Heraklion.

In 2024, he was selected for the Greece men's under-23 3x3 basketball team and took part in the FIBA 3x3 U23 Nations League in Voiron, France. He was again included in the Greek squad for the later Nations League stops in Voiron that summer.

== Awards and distinctions ==
- Elite League MVP of the Round: 6th round, 2023–24
- Elite League co-MVP of the Round: 19th round, 2023–24
