= Mykonos B.C. =

Men's basketball team in Greece

Mykonos Betsson
- Leagues: Greek Basket League; FIBA Europe Cup
- Founded: 1981
- History: Mykonos B.C. (1981–present)
- Arena: P. Chanioti Ano Mera Indoor Hall
- Capacity: 1,014
- Location: Mykonos, Greece
- Team colors: Blue and White
- Main sponsor: Betsson
- President: Alexandros Aggeletakis
- Head coach: Vangelis Ziagkos
- Championships: Greek 2nd Division (2025); Greek National League 2 (2022)
- Website: mykonosbc.gr

Mykonos B.C., also known for sponsorship reasons as Mykonos Betsson, is a Greek professional basketball club based on the island of Mykonos. The club competes in the Greek Basket League and, for the 2026–27 season, the FIBA Europe Cup. Its home arena is the P. Chanioti Ano Mera Indoor Hall.

== History ==
Mykonos basketball club was founded in 1981 and became a member of the Hellenic Basketball Federation in 1989.

In the 2021–22 season, Mykonos won its group in the Greek third division with an undefeated record, securing promotion to the second-tier national competition.

On 14 July 2023, it was announced that Mykonos had received a wild card to compete in the Greek A2 Elite League for the first time in the club's history.

On 8 May 2025, Mykonos defeated Neaniki Estia Megaridas in the Final Four of the Greek A2 Elite League, held at the Giannis Bourousis Karditsa New Indoor Arena, and secured promotion to the Greek Basket League for the first time in club history.

In September 2025, the club became known as Mykonos Betsson following a naming sponsorship agreement with Betsson.

During its inaugural 2025–26 season in the Greek Basket League, Mykonos qualified for the league playoffs and the Final Eight of the Greek Basketball Cup. The club also secured a place in the 2026–27 FIBA Europe Cup, marking its first participation in European club competition.

== Arena ==
For many years, the club did not have its own indoor arena on Mykonos and was forced to play home games on the neighbouring island of Tinos.

In 2020, the Panagiotis Chaniotis Ano Mera Indoor Hall opened on Mykonos and became the club's home arena.

Following the club's promotion to the Greek Basket League in 2025, the arena underwent renovations, with its capacity increased to approximately 1,000 spectators.

== Titles and honors ==
=== Domestic competitions ===
- Greek Elite League

Winners (1): 2024–25

- Greek third division

Group winners (1): 2021–22

- Cyclades Basketball Clubs Association

Winners (1): 2020–21

== Roster ==
Roster for the 2026–27 season.

Note: Flags indicate national team eligibility at FIBA-sanctioned events. Players may hold other non-FIBA nationalities not displayed.

Mykonos roster
Players
Coaches

Pos.	No.	Nat.	Name	Ht.	Wt.	Age
C	0	(United States)	Funderburk, D. J.	2.08 m (6 ft 10 in)	102 kg (225 lb)	29 – 12 April 1997
PG	1	(United States)	Appleby, Tyree	1.85 m (6 ft 1 in)	75 kg (165 lb)	28 – 30 September 1998
PF	2	(United States)	Moore, Khalid	2.01 m (6 ft 7 in)	93 kg (205 lb)	26 – 29 July 2000
PF	4	(United States)	Childs, Elijah	2.01 m (6 ft 7 in)	102 kg (225 lb)	27 – 10 January 1999
C	6	(Greece)	Kavvadas, Vassilis	2.06 m (6 ft 9 in)	127 kg (280 lb)	34 – 28 December 1991
PF	9	(Greece)	Lagios, Angelos	2.02 m (6 ft 8 in)	93 kg (205 lb)	23 – 14 April 2003
SF	10	(Greece)	Skoulidas, Dionysis	2.01 m (6 ft 7 in)	98 kg (216 lb)	29 – 29 July 1997
C	12	(Greece)	Petanidis, Kyriakos	2.04 m (6 ft 8 in)		25 – 30 March 2001
PG	13	(Cyprus) (Greece)	Tigkas, Filippos	1.83 m (6 ft 0 in)		23 – 5 November 2002
SG	14	(Greece)	Sidiroilias, Giannis	1.97 m (6 ft 6 in)		24 – 29 October 2001
PG	17	(Greece)	Mantzaris, Vangelis (C)	1.96 m (6 ft 5 in)	95 kg (209 lb)	36 – 16 April 1990
SF	19	(Greece)	Tolias, Vassilis	1.98 m (6 ft 6 in)	98 kg (216 lb)	23 – 30 October 2002
PF	20	(Greece)	Iatridis, Konstantinos	2.07 m (6 ft 9 in)		25 – 14 October 2001
SG	22	(United States)	Love, Jermaine	1.91 m (6 ft 3 in)	84 kg (185 lb)	37 – 27 March 1989
SF	25	(United States)	Harrell, Ronnie	2.01 m (6 ft 7 in)	91 kg (201 lb)	30 – 11 March 1996
G	30	(United States)	Cannady, Devin	1.88 m (6 ft 2 in)	83 kg (183 lb)	30 – 21 May 1996

Head coach

- (Greece) Vangelis Ziagkos

Assistant coach(es)

- (Greece) Vangelis Tselepis
- (Greece) Panagiotis Chatzieleftheriou

Team manager

- (Greece) Sotiris Manolopoulos

Legend

- (C) Team captain
- Injured

- Roster
Updated: 20 September 2026

=== Depth chart ===
Pos.	Starting 5	Bench 1	Bench 2	Bench 3
C	D. J. Funderburk	Vassilis Kavvadas	Kyriakos Petanidis
PF	Elijah Childs	Khalid Moore	Konstantinos Iatridis	Angelos Lagios
SF	Ronnie Harrell	Sakis Skoulidas	Vassilis Tolias
SG	Jermaine Love	Devin Cannady	Giannis Sidiroilias
PG	Tyree Appleby	Vangelis Mantzaris	Filippos Tigkas

=== Coaching and management staff ===
For the 2026–27 season, Mykonos retained Vangelis Ziagkos as head coach, assisted by Vangelis Tselepis and Panagiotis Chatzieleftheriou. Giannis Tzimas continued as general manager and Sotiris Manolopoulos as team manager.

Position	Name
Head coach	(Greece) Vangelis Ziagkos
Assistant coach	(Greece) Vangelis Tselepis
Assistant coach	(Greece) Panagiotis Chatzieleftheriou
General manager	(Greece) Giannis Tzimas
Team manager	(Greece) Sotiris Manolopoulos
Strength and conditioning coach	(Greece) Giannis Chrysafis
Physiotherapist	(Greece) Periklis Tzinas
Physiotherapist	(Greece) Nikos Skandalidis

== Notable players ==
Note: Flags indicate national team eligibility at FIBA-sanctioned events. Players may hold other non-FIBA nationalities not displayed.

Criteria

To appear in this section a player must have either:

- Set a club record or won an individual award while at the club
- Played at least one official international match for their national team at any time
- Played at least one official NBA match at any time.

- (Greece) Kostas Efstratiou
- (Greece) Andreas Kanonidis
- (Greece) Petros Melissaratos
- (Greece) Vangelis Mantzaris
- (Greece) Panagiotis Filippakos
- (Greece) Petros Geromichalos
- (Greece) Dimitris Deimezis
- (Greece) Vassilis Kavvadas
- (Greece) Tasos Spyropoulos
- (Greece) Dimitrios Stamatis
- (Greece) Angelos Tsamis
- (Greece) (Australia) Nic Pozoglou
- (Greece) (United States) Nick Paulos
- (Greece) (Canada) Cole Syllas
- (United States) Colin Slater
- (United States) Jeremy Evans
- (United States) Kendrick Ray
- (United States) Khalid Moore
