= Travele Jones =

American professional basketball player

Personal information
- Born: November 9, 1988 (age 36) Los Angeles, California, U.S.
- Listed height: 6 ft 8 in (2.03 m)
- Listed weight: 205 lb (93 kg)

Career information
- High school: Inglewood (Inglewood, California)
- College: Cerritos College (2006–2008); Texas Southern (2009–2011)
- NBA draft: 2011: undrafted
- Playing career: 2011–2018
- Position: Power forward

Career history
- 2011–2012: SAM Basket Massagno
- 2012: Verviers-Pepinster
- 2013–2014: Sendai 89ers
- 2015–2016: Leones de Quilpué
- 2016: Arkadikos
- 2016: Atlético Welcome
- 2017: Nift Al-Janoub
- 2017–2018: Saigon Heat
- 2018: PEA

Career highlights
- SWAC Player of the Year (2011); First-team All-SWAC (2011); AP honorable mention All-American (2011)

Travele Andrew Jones (born November 9, 1988) is an American former professional basketball player. He was an All-American college player for the Texas Southern Tigers.

== College career ==
Jones came to Texas Southern after two seasons at Cerritos College, a junior college in California. After averaging 13.7 points and 5.8 rebounds per game as a junior in 2009–10, Jones raised his game in his final season. He led the Tigers to a Southwestern Athletic Conference (SWAC) regular season championship, averaging 16 points and 6.9 rebounds per game. At the conclusion of the season, Jones was named the SWAC Player of the Year and an honorable mention All-American by the Associated Press.

== Professional career ==
After going undrafted in the 2011 NBA draft, Jones signed with SAM Basket Massagno of Switzerland for the 2011–12 season. He went on to average 16.8 points, 7.3 rebounds, 1.8 assists and 2.2 steals in 26 games for Massagno.

On October 4, 2012, Jones signed with Verviers-Pepinster of Belgium for the 2012–13 season. Later that month, he left Verviers-Pepinster after just two games.

In the summer of 2013, Jones signed with the Sendai 89ers of Japan for the 2013–14 season. He went on to average 15.8 points, 8.8 rebounds, 2.1 assists and 1.5 steals in 48 games for Sendai. On August 29, 2014, he agreed to terms with the Aomori Watts, but later left the team and returned to the United States before appearing in a game for them.

On November 2, 2014, Jones was acquired by the Bakersfield Jam of the NBA Development League. He was later waived by the Jam before the start of the season.

On February 10, 2016, he signed with Arkadikos. He went on to average 2.2 points, 1.8 rebounds, 0.4 assists and 0.3 steals in 9 games for Arkadikos.
