= Vangelis Ziagkos =

Greek coach and former basketball player

- Ziagkos in 2026

Mykonos
- Position: Head coach
- League: Greek Basketball League

Personal information
- Born: March 14, 1976 (age 50) Ioannina, Greece
- Coaching career: 1995–present

Career history

Coaching
- 1995–2008: AEK Athens (juniors and cadets)
- 2008–2011: AEK Athens (assistant)
- 2011: Ikaros Nea Smyrni
- 2012–2014: AEK Athens
- 2014–2015: Doxa Lefkada
- 2015–2016: Panionios
- 2016–2017: Al Riyadi Beirut (assistant)
- 2017–2018: Panionios
- 2018–2020: Rethymno
- 2020: Iraklis Thessaloniki
- 2021–2022: Vasas
- 2022–2024: Nagasaki Velca (assistant)
- 2024–present: Mykonos

Career highlights
- As head coach: Hungarian Hepp Cup winner (2022); 2× Greek Elite League champion (2014, 2025); Greek 2nd Division Coach of the Year (2014); Greek 3rd Division champion (2016)

Evangelos "Vangelis" Ziagkos (alternate spellings: Vaggelis, Ziagos) (born March 14, 1976; Greek: Βαγγέλης Ζιάγκος) is a Greek professional basketball coach, currently managing Mykonos of the Greek Basketball League.

== Playing career ==
Ziagkos played youth club basketball with Attalos Nea Filadelfeia, and also played in the Greek minor leagues with the same club's men's team.

== Coaching career ==
Ziagkos became the head coach the Greek basketball club AEK Athens, prior to the 2012–13 season. He led AEK to gain a league promotion that season, from the Greek 3rd Division, to the Greek 2nd Division. In the following 2013–14 season, he led AEK to the Greek 2nd Division championship. He was also named the Greek 2nd Division's Coach of the Year that season.

He then worked as the head coach of the Greek clubs Doxa Lefkadas and Panionios.

On November 20, 2018, he was appointed head coach of the Rethymno Cretan Kings.

On July 19, 2020, he has signed with Iraklis of the Greek Basket League.
