= Kostas Ezomo =

Greek basketball player

Kostas Ezomo Κώστας Εζόμο
Neaniki Estia Megaridas B.C.
- Position: Power forward / center
- League: Greek B Basket League

Personal information
- Born: September 12, 1989 (age 37) Schimatari, Greece
- Listed height: 6 ft 7 in (2.01 m)
- Listed weight: 256 lb (116 kg)

Career information
- High school: Spartanburg Prep (Spartanburg, South Carolina)
- College: Coastal Georgia (2012–2014)
- NBA draft: 2014: undrafted
- Playing career: 2014–present

Career history
- 2014–2016: Arkadikos
- 2016–2017: Pagrati
- 2017–2018: Kymis
- 2018–2021: Apollon Patras
- 2021–present: Neaniki Estia Megaridas B.C.

Kostas Ezomo (Greek: Κώστας Εζόμο; born September 12, 1989, in Schimatari, Greece) is a Greek basketball player for Neaniki Estia Megaridas B.C. of the Greek B Basket League. He is 6'7' (2.01) tall power forward.

== College career ==
Ezomo played college basketball for Coastal Georgia.

== Professional career ==
Of Nigerian descent, Ezomo start his professional career with Arkadikos in 2014. He stayed with Arkadikos for two seasons and on 2016, he joined Pagrati of the Greek A2 League.

On August 25, 2017, Ezomo joined Kymis of the Greek Basket League.

On September 25, 2021, Ezomo signed with Neaniki Estia Megaridas B.C. of the Greek B Basket League.
