= Ivan Mišković =

No. 10 – Koopspor Nicosia
- Position: Power forward

Personal information
- Born: April 9, 1984 (age 42) Belgrade, SR Serbia, SFR Yugoslavia
- Listed height: 6 ft 8 in (2.03 m)
- Listed weight: 225 lb (102 kg)

Career information
- College: Alaska Fairbanks (2002–2006)
- NBA draft: 2006: undrafted
- Playing career: 2006–2020

Career history
- 2006–2008: Horsens IC
- 2008–2009: Bakken Bears
- 2009–2010: CSU Sibiu
- 2010: SEFA Arkadikos
- 2010–2011: BC Timișoara
- 2011–2012: MARSÓ-VAGÉP Nyíregyházi
- 2012–2013: SCM CSU Craiova
- 2013–2014: Kumanovo
- 2014: Randers Cimbria
- 2014–2015: Timba Timișoara
- 2015: Lastovka
- 2015–2017: Aurore Vitré Basket
- 2017: OKK Beograd
- 2017–2019: Kožuv
- 2019: Spartak
- 2019: Mladost Mrkonjić Grad
- 2019–2020: Koopspor Nicosia

Career highlights
- Danish Basketball League (2010); Danish Cup (2010)

Ivan Mišković (born April 9, 1984) is a former Serbian professional basketball player. He played college basketball for the Alaska Nanooks.

== College statistics ==
Year	Team	GP	GS	MPG	FG%	3P%	FT%	RPG	APG	SPG	BPG	PPG
2002–03	Alaska Fairbanks	2	0	1.0	.000	.000	.000	0.5	0.0	0.0	0.0	0.0
2003–04	Alaska Fairbanks	4	0	24.7	.409	.000	.571	6.3	1.00	0.0	0.7	7.3
2004–05	Alaska Fairbanks	3	0	19.3	.471	.000	.571	3.3	0.3	0.7	0.7	6.7
2005–06	Alaska Fairbanks	3	0	17.0	.571	.000	.526	3.7	0.7	0.7	1.3	8.7
