= 2014–15 Greek A2 Basket League =

- League: Greek A2 Basket League
- Sport: Basketball
- Teams: 14
- Season champions: Kavala

Greek A2 Basket League seasons
- ← 2013–14 2015–16 →

The 2014–15 Greek A2 Basket League was the 29th season of the Greek A2 Basket League, the second-tier level professional club basketball league in Greece. The winner of the league was Kavala The clubs that were promoted to the top-tier Greek Basket League were Kavala, Arkadikos, and Lavrio. In contrast, the teams that were relegated to the third tier Greek B Basket League were Filippos Veria, Ermis Lagkada, and Ilysiakos Ilysiakos withdrew from the league in the middle of the season, because of economic debts. All the games of Ilysiakos were given back to their opponents with scores of 20–0.

== Teams ==
Location of teams in Greek A2 Basket League 2014–15

Club	Home city
Aetos	Attiki, Athens
Arkadikos	Tripoli
Doxa Lefkadas	Lefkada
Ermis Lagkada	Langadas, Thessaloniki
Ethnikos Piraeus	Piraeus, Athens
Filippos Veroias	Veria
Ilysiakos	Ilisia, Athens
Iraklis Thessaloniki	Thessaloniki
Kavala	Kavala
Lavrio	Lavrio
Livadeia	Livadeia
OFI	Heraklion
Pagrati	Pangrati, Athens
Psychiko	Psychiko, Athens

== Standings ==
Pos	Club	Pts	Pld	W	L	PF	PA	Diff	Qualification or Relegation
1.	Kavala	47	26	21	5	1808	1520	288	Promoted to Greek Basket League
2.	Arkadikos	45	26	19	7	1825	1672	153	Promoted to Greek Basket League
3.	Lavrio^{a}	44	26	18	8	1776	1646	130	Promoted to Greek Basket League
4.	Ethnikos Piraeus	43	26	17	9	1814	1710	104	
5.	Psychiko	43	26	17	9	1803	1719	84	
6.	Livadeia	43	26	17	9	1904	1832	72	
7.	Doxa Lefkadas	42	26	16	10	1908	1801	107	
8.	Pagrati	39	26	13	13	1952	2014	-62	
9.	OFI	37	26	11	15	1804	1798	6	
10.	Aetos	36	26	10	16	1773	1755	18	
11.	Iraklis Thessaloniki	35	26	9	17	1778	1823	-45	
12.	Filippos Veroias ^{b}	35	26	9	17	1617	1776	-159	
13.	Ermis Lagkada^{c}	30	26	5	20	1602	1778	-176	Relegated to Greek B League
14.	Ilysiakos	0	26	0	26	0	520	-520	Relegated to Greek B League

- ^a Lavrio was promoted to the Greek Basket League because KAOD withdrew from the league.
- ^b Filippos Veroias remained in the A2, after a decision of ASEAD (Greek sports court).
- ^c Ermis Lagkada had -1 point.

== Top scorers ==
Top Scorers
Rank	Player	Total points scored	Club
1.	Ioannis Dimakos	467	Psychiko
2.	Giannis Lianos	402	OFI
3.	Vangelis Sakellariou	398	Lavrio
4.	Ioannis Rodostoglou	366	Aetos
5.	Ioannis Gagaloudis	364	Livadeia

== See also ==
- 2014–15 Greek Basketball Cup
- 2014–15 Greek Basket League (1st tier)
