= Arkadikos B.C. =

SEFA Arkadikos
- Leagues: Greek A2 Basket League; Greek Cup
- Founded: 1976
- Arena: Tripoli Indoor Hall
- Capacity: 1,000
- Location: Tripoli, Greece
- Team colors: Blue and White
- President: Anastasios Smyrniotis
- Vice-president: Nikos Koutsoumpos
- 2015–16 position: Greek Basket League 13th (Relegated)
- Website: arcadikosbc.gr
Home	Away

Arkadikos B.C., or S.E.F.A. Arkadikos B.C. (Greek: Αρκαδικός ΚΑΕ), is a Greek professional basketball club that is based in Tripoli, Greece.

== History ==
Arkadikos' basketball section was founded in 1976, under the name S.E.F.A. Arkadikos. During the 2007–08 season, Arkadikos managed to achieve the first place and qualify to the Greek 3rd Division.

In 2010, the club Arkadikos competed in the Greek Second Division for the first time. In the club's first season in the Greek 2nd Division, Arkadikos managed to finish in fourth place in the Greek Second Division.

In 2015, Arkadikos finished second in the Greek 2nd Division, thus earning promotion to the Greek Basket League for the 2015–16 season.

== Arenas ==
Arkadikos play their home games at the 1,000 seat Tripoli Indoor Hall.

== Season-by-season results ==
Recent Seasons
Season	Division	Place
2008–09	B Basket League	4th
2009–10	A2 Basket League	5th
2010–11	A2 Basket League	7th
2011–12	A2 Basket League	6th
2012–13	A2 Basket League	8th
2013–14	A2 Basket League	6th
2014–15	A2 Basket League	2nd
2015–16	Basket League	13th
2016-17	A2 Basket League	11th

== Roster ==
Note: Flags indicate national team eligibility at FIBA-sanctioned events. Players may hold other non-FIBA nationalities not displayed.

Arkadikos roster
Players
Coaches

Pos.	No.	Nat.	Name	Ht.	Wt.	Age
G/F	2	(Greece)	Prodromou, Giannis	1.96 m (6 ft 5 in)		38 – 26 February 1987
SG	6	(Greece)	Kapris, Fotis	1.94 m (6 ft 4 in)	86 kg (190 lb)	26 – 18 May 1999
SG	8	(Greece)	Kopsaftis, Giorgos (C)	1.92 m (6 ft 4 in)	87 kg (192 lb)	43 – 25 September 1982
PG	34	(Greece)	Pinnis, Dimitris	1.90 m (6 ft 3 in)		31 – 15 May 1994

Head coach

- (Greece) Giannis Diamantakos

Assistant coach(es)

- (Greece) Xaris Alexopoulos

Legend

- (C) Team captain
- Injured

- Roster

== Notable players ==
Note: Flags indicate national team eligibility at FIBA-sanctioned events. Players may hold other non-FIBA nationalities not displayed.

Criteria

To appear in this section a player must have either:

- Set a club record or won an individual award while at the club
- Played at least one official international match for their national team at any time
- Played at least one official NBA match at any time.

- Nikos Chatzis
- Ioannis Karamalegkos
- Akis Kallinikidis
- Sakis Karidas
- Petros Noeas
- Andronikos Gizogiannis
- Sokrates Gizogiannis
- Dimitrios Karadolamis
- Dimitrios Katiakos
- Alexandros Sigounas
- Georgios Galiotos
- Fotios Lampropoulos
- Vassilis Kavvadas
- Kostas Ezomo
- / Miloš Šakota
- Matti Nuutinen
- Stefan Đorđević
- / Ivan Mišković
- Devon van Oostrum
- Steve Leven
- Askia Booker
- Cameron Jones
- Alex Legion
- Travele Jones

== Head coaches ==
- Ioannis Kastritis
