= Fotios Lampropoulos =

Greek basketball player

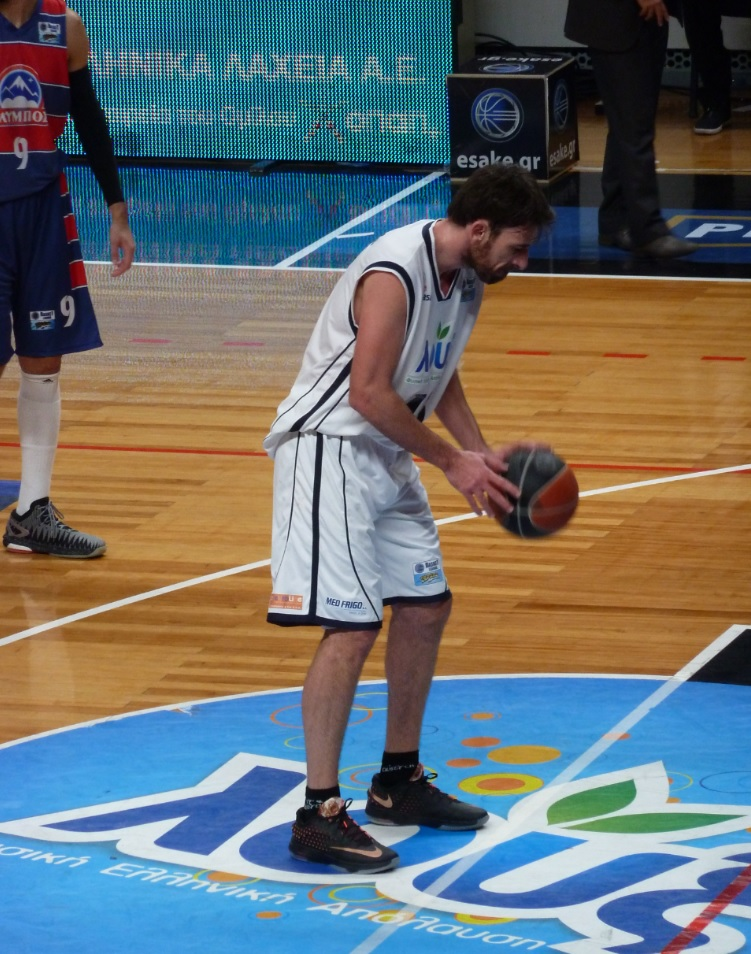
- Fotis Lampropoulos playing with Apollon Patras against Trikala Aries.

Personal information
- Born: September 11, 1983 (age 43) Patras, Greece
- Listed height: 206 cm (6 ft 9 in)
- Listed weight: 104 kg (229 lb)

Career information
- Playing career: 2003–present
- Position: Power forward / center

Career history
- 2003: Apolloniada Patras
- 2004: Romauto Mataró
- 2004–2005: Anua Gran Canaria
- 2004–2005: →Fadesa Gran Canaria
- 2005: Tarragona
- 2005–2007: L'Hospitalet
- 2007–2008: Tenerife Rural
- 2008–2009: AEL Larissa
- 2009–2011: Iraklis
- 2011–2015: Iberostar Tenerife
- 2015: Vanoli Cremona
- 2015–2016: Arkadikos
- 2016: Apollon Patras
- 2016: Ferro Carril Oeste
- 2016–2018: Boca Juniors
- 2018: Guaiqueríes de Margarita
- 2018–2019: Club Malvín
- 2019: Estudiantes
- 2019–2020: Panionios
- 2020–2021: Al Sadd
- 2021–2022: Njarðvík
- 2022–2024: Þór Þorlákshöfn
- 2024–2025: Hamar
- 2025–2026: Fjölnir
- 2026: Njarðvík

Career highlights
- LEB Oro champion (2012); Icelandic Cup (2021)

Fotios Lampropoulos (alternatively spelled: Fotis, Lambropoulos or Labropoulos; Greek: Φώτης Λαμπρόπουλος), born 11 September 1983, is a Greek professional basketball player for Fjölnir of the 1. deild karla. He is a 2.06 m (6 ft 9 in) tall power forward-center.

== Professional career ==
Lampropoulos started his playing career with his home town side, Apolloniada Patras, moving up from the club's youth ranks - where he won a Greek junior league MVP title - to the first team in 2003, to play in the Greek C1 League (amateur Greek fourth division). He then transferred to the Spanish fourth division Liga EBA side, Romauto Mataró, in January 2004.

His performances with Mataró caught the eye of the Spanish first division club CB Gran Canaria, who invited him to a summer league, before signing him. The 2004–05 season would see Lampropoulos split his time between Gran Canaria's second team in the Liga EBA and the first team in the Liga ACB (seven games) and ULEB Cup (EuroCup) (eight games, for an average of 6.1 points and 2.6 rebounds per game), before moving in April 2005 to CB Tarragona of the LEB (Spanish second division). He stayed in the LEB the next three seasons, playing the first two with CB L'Hospitalet, and the last one with Tenerife CB.

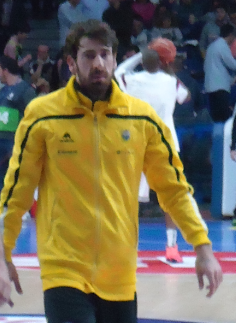
Lampropoulos with Iberostar Tenerife.

Lampropoulos returned home to Greece in 2008, joining Greek Basket League outfit AEL Larissa. He moved to the Greek second division the next season, joining Iraklis, with whom he obtained a league promotion. In the 2011–12 season, he started the season with Iraklis, in the Greek first division, before returning to Tenerife CB in, February 2011.

The Greek stayed with Tenerife until 2015, as the Canarians were promoted to the Spanish first division, Liga ACB in 2012. He would miss nearly the whole 2013–14 season, after suffering an ACL injury to his left ankle, during a preseason game. He returned in May 2014, with a double-double (11 points and 10 rebounds in less than 20 minutes) in an ACB game.

When Tenerife did not keep him following the 2014–15 season, Lampropoulos started training in Italy, with the Italian League side Vanoli Cremona, in August, with the club planning to keep him until September.

In 2015, Lampropoulos signed an open contract with an opt-out option with Arkadikos of the Greek Basket League. He left the club on January 8, 2016, and signed with the Greek club Apollon Patras.

Lampropoulos moved to the Argentine League club Ferro Carril Oeste in 2016, where he finished the 2015–16 season. For the 2016–17 season, he joined the Argentine League club Boca Juniors.

In August 2021, Lampropoulos signed with Njarðvík of the Úrvalsdeild karla. On 18 September he scored 20 points in Njarðvík's 97–93 win against Stjarnan in the Icelandic Cup final, ending the clubs 16 year major title draught. On 2 October 2021, he had 26 points and 11 rebounds in Njarðvík's 100–113 loss against Þór Þorlákshöfn in the Icelandic Super Cup. For the season in the Úrvalsdeild, he averaged 16.2 points and team leading 9.6 rebounds per game, helping Njarðvík to the best record in the league.

Lampropoulos remained in the Úrvalsdeild the following season, signing with Þór Þorlákshöfn in June 2022.

In May 2024, Lampropoulos signed with 1. deild karla club Hamar.

In June 2025, he signed with Fjölnir. In October 2026, he signed a short-term contract with Njarðvík due to injuries in their ranks. He left the club after 3 games when it signed David Okeke.
