= Stefan Nikolić (basketball, born 1987) =

Serbian basketball player

Stefan Nikolic
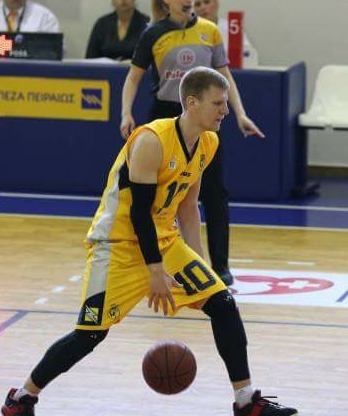
- Nikolić with Pefkohori

No. 33 – CSM Târgu Jiu
- Position: Point guard
- League: Liga Națională

Personal information
- Born: August 13, 1987 (age 39)
- Listed height: 6 ft 3 in (1.91 m)
- Listed weight: 187 lb (85 kg)

Career information
- NBA draft: 2009: undrafted
- Playing career: 2002–present

Career history
- 2002–2003: OKK Beograd
- 2004: Lukoil Academic
- 2004–2005: Lavovi 063
- 2005–2006: Ergonom Best Nis
- 2006–2008: KD Slovan
- 2008–2009: Köln 99ers
- 2010–2013: Energia Rovinari
- 2013–2015: AEK Athens
- 2015: Karpoš Sokoli
- 2015–2016: Evropi Pefkohori
- 2016–2017: Gymnastikos S. Larissas
- 2017: Étoile Charleville-Mézières
- 2017–2018: CSM U Oradea
- 2018–2019: Bratunac
- 2019–2020: CSM Mediaș
- 2020–present: CSM Târgu Jiu

Career highlights
- Greek 2nd Division champion (2014); Bulgarian League champion (2004); Bulgarian Cup champion (2004)
Medals
Men's basketball
Representing Serbia
U20 European Championship
Gold medal – first place	2007 Slovenia	Team
Representing Serbia and Montenegro
U16 European Championship
Gold medal – first place	2003 Spain	U16 National Team

Stefan Nikolic (born August 13, 1987) is a Serbian professional basketball player for CSM Târgu Jiu of the Liga Națională. He usually plays the point guard position.

== Awards and accomplishments ==
- Greek 2nd Division champion (2014)
- Bulgarian League champion (2004)
- Bulgarian Cup champion (2004)

== Personal life ==
He is a son of a Serbian basketball coach and former player Slobodan Nikolić.
