= Filippos Verias B.C. =

- Nickname: Erythrolefkoi (The Red-Whites)
- Leagues: Greek A2 League; Greek Cup
- Founded: 1962; 63 years ago
- History: Filippos Verias B.C. 1962–present
- Arena: Makrochori Municipal Sports Center
- Capacity: 700
- Location: Veria, Imathia, Greece
- Team colors: Red and White
- President: Ilias Lazos
- Head coach: Christos Blatsiotis
- Championships: 1 Greek 3rd Division; 1 Greek 4th Division; 6 T.E. West-Central Macedonia; 2 E.KA.S.KE.DY.M. 2 E.KA.S.KE.M.
- Website: filipposbc.gr
Home	Away

Filippos Verias (alternate spellings: Philippos, Veria, Veroias; Greek: Φίλιππος Βέροιας) is a Greek professional basketball club that is based in Veria. Filippos was founded in 1962, and its colours are white and red. Its emblem is Philip of Macedonia.

== History ==
Filippos Verias' senior men's basketball team was founded in 1962. In the 2013–14 season, the club played in the Greek 2nd Division (A2 National), for the first time. In the previous years, the club played mostly in the Greek 3rd Division (B National), and in the Greek C League (C National) (the third and fourth divisions of the Greek basketball league system).

== Season by season ==
Season	Division	Place	Notes
2003–04	Greek 4th Division	5th	
2004–05	Greek 4th Division	7th	
2005–06	Greek 4th Division	6th	
2006–07	Greek 4th Division	9th	
2007–08	Greek 4th Division	5th	
2008–09	Greek 4th Division	5th	
2009–10	Greek 4th Division	2nd	Promoted to Greek 3rd Division
2010–11	Greek 3rd Division	14th	Relegated to Greek 4th Division
2011–12	Greek 4th Division	1st	Promoted to Greek 3rd Division
2012–13	Greek 3rd Division	1st	Promoted to Greek 2nd Division
2013–14	Greek 2nd Division	8th	
2014–15	Greek 2nd Division	12th	Remained in the league
2015–16	Greek 2nd Division	15th	Relegated to Greek 3rd Division
2016–17	Greek 3rd Division	14th	Relegated to Greek 4th Division
2017–18	Greek 4th Division	1st	Promoted to Greek 3rd Division
2018–19	Greek 3rd Division	4th	Promoted to Greek 2nd Division
2019–20	Greek 2nd Division	14th	

== Titles and honors ==
National:

- Greek 3rd Division 2nd Group Champions: (2013)
- Greek 4th Division 3rd Group Champions: (2012)

Local:

- 6× T.E. West-Central Macedonia Regional League Champions: (1968, 1970, 1974, 1976, 1977, 1980)
- 2× E.KA.S.KE.DY.M. Local League Champions: (1981, 1982)
- 2× E.KA.S.KE.M. Local League Champions: (2001, 2003)

== Roster ==
Note: Flags indicate national team eligibility at FIBA-sanctioned events. Players may hold other non-FIBA nationalities not displayed.

Filippos Verias B.C. roster
Players
Coaches

Pos.	No.	Nat.	Name	Ht.	Wt.	Age
C	5	(Greece)	Tozios, Ioannis	2.09 m (6 ft 10 in)		34 – 12 July 1990
PG	6	(Serbia)	Otovic, Nikola	1.85 m (6 ft 1 in)		35 – 7 September 1989
PG	7	(Greece)	Deligeorgis, Apollon	1.92 m (6 ft 4 in)		31 – 3 July 1993
SF	9	(Greece)	Naoumis, Apostolos	1.98 m (6 ft 6 in)		31 – 1 April 1993
C	10	(Greece)	Kasampalis, Tasos	2.08 m (6 ft 10 in)
F/C		(Greece)	Iatridis, Konstantinos	2.06 m (6 ft 9 in)		23 – 14 October 2001

Head coach

- (Greece) Dimitris Gimas

Assistant coach(es)

- (Greece) Christos Baltsiotis

Legend

- (C) Team captain
- Injured

- Roster
Updated: 2015-09-20
