= 2013–14 Greek A2 Basket League =

- League: Greek A2 Basket League
- Sport: Basketball
- Teams: 14
- Season champions: AEK Athens

Greek A2 Basket League seasons
- ← 2012–13 2014–15 →

The 2013–14 Greek A2 Basket League was the 28th season of the Greek A2 Basket League, the second tier level professional club basketball league in Greece. The league finished on 10 May 2014. The winner was AEK Athens. The teams that were promoted to the first tier Greek Basket League were AEK Athens and Koroivos Amaliada. In contrast, the teams that were relegated to the third tier Greek C Basket League were Filathlitikos Zografou, Ikaroi Serron, and KAP Agia Paraskevi.

== Previous 2012–13 season's results ==
Location of teams in Greek A2 Basket League 2013–14
- Promoted to Greek Basket League
  - AENK (Champion of Greek A2 League)
  - Trikala (2nd place of Greek A2 League)
- Relegated from Greek Basket League
  - Peristeri (13th place) (Not played, relegated directly to B National)
  - Kavala (14th place)
- Promoted from Greek B Basket League
  - Psychiko (1st place – A Group)
  - Filippos Veroias (1st place – B Group)
  - AEK Athens (2nd place – A Group)
  - Iraklis Thessaloniki (2nd place – B Group) (replaced Peristeri )
- Relegated to Greek B Basket League
  - [[[Niki Volos B.C.|Niki Volos]] (12th place)
  - Irakleio OAA (13th place)
  - Doxa Lefkadas (14th place)

== Season standings ==
=== League table ===
Pos	Club	Pld	W	L	PF	PA	Diff	Pts	Qualification or Relegation
1.	AEK Athens	26	23	3	1973	1679	+294	49	Promoted to Greek Basket League
2.	Koroivos Amaliada	26	22	4	1973	1751	+222	48	Promoted to Greek Basket League
3.	Kavala	26	20	6	1959	1679	+280	46	
4.	Psychiko	26	16	10	2066	1913	+153	42	
5.	Pagrati	26	13	13	1965	2025	-60	39	
6.	SEF Arkadikos	26	12	14	1812	1848	-36	38	
7.	Iraklis	26	12	14	1867	1931	-64	38	
8.	Filippos Veroias	25	12	14	1857	1945	-88	38	
9.	OFI Crete	26	11	15	1941	1891	+50	37	
10.	Lavrio	26	11	15	1904	1956	-52	37	
11.	Ermis Lagkada	26	10	16	1848	1882	-34	36	
12.	Filathlitikos	26	10	16	1766	1843	-77	36	Relegated to Greek B Basket League
13.	AOK Ikaroi Serron	26	8	18	1709	1868	-159	34	Relegated to Greek B Basket League
14.	KAP Agia Paraskevis	26	2	24	1866	2228	-362	28	Relegated to Greek B Basket League

== See also ==
- 2013–14 Greek Basket League (1st tier)
