= Rosters of the top basketball teams in European club competitions =

The rosters of the top basketball teams in each season's European-wide professional club competitions (tiers 1-4):

== 1958 ==
CHAMPIONS CUP

Winner: Rīgas ASK (USSR) Jānis Krūmiņš, Valdis Muižnieks, Maigonis Valdmanis, Gundars Muiznieks, Oļģerts Hehts, Leons Jankovskis, Alvils Gulbis, Teobalds Kalherts, Aivars Leonciks, Juris Kalniņš, Ivars Veritis, Janis Davids, Gunars Silinš (Coach: Alexander Gomelsky)

Runner-up: Academic Sofia (Bulgaria) Viktor Radev, Georgi Panov, Ljubomir Panov, Mikhail Semov, Konstantin Stoimenov, Nikola Ilov, Atanas Atanasov, Ivan Emanuilov, Ljubomir Dardov, Aleksandar Blagoev, Nejcho Nejchev, Petko Lazarov (Coach: Bozhidar Takev)

== 1958–59 ==
CHAMPIONS CUP

Winner: Rīgas ASK (USSR) Jānis Krūmiņš, Valdis Muižnieks, Gundars Muiznieks, Maigonis Valdmanis, Oļģerts Hehts, Leons Jankovskis, Alvils Gulbis, Teobalds Kalherts, Juris Kalniņš, Janis Davids, Aivars Leonciks, Ivars Veritis, Andrejs Bergs, Gunars Silinš, Janis Taurinš, Gunars Jansons (Coach: Alexander Gomelsky)

Runner-up: Academic Sofia (Bulgaria) Viktor Radev, Ljubomir Panov, Georgi Panov, Mikhail Semov, Petko Lazarov, Konstantin Stoimenov, Atanas Atanasov, Nikola Ilov, Ivan Emanuilov, Gencho Rashkov, Ljubomir Dardov, Georgi Kanev, Emanuil Gjaurov (Coach: Bozhidar Takev)

== 1959–60 ==
CHAMPIONS CUP

Winner: Rīgas ASK (USSR) Jānis Krūmiņš, Gundars Muiznieks, Valdis Muižnieks, Maigonis Valdmanis, Juris Kalniņš, Alvils Gulbis, Leons Jankovskis, Oļģerts Hehts, Janis Davids, Ivars Veritis, Aivars Leonciks, Andrejs Bergs, Teobalds Kalherts (Coach: Alexander Gomelsky)

Runner-up: Dinamo Tbilisi (USSR) Levan Intskirveli, Guram Minashvili, Anzor Lezhava, Valeri Altabaev, Aleksandre Kiladze, Levan Moseshvili, Givi Abashidze, Vladimer Ugrekhelidze, Revaz Gogelia, Ilarion Khazaradze, Mikheil Asitashvili, Kartlos Dzhaparidze, Tamaz Kakauridze (Coach: Otar Korkia)

== 1960–61 ==
CHAMPIONS CUP

Winner: CSKA Moscow (USSR) Gennadi Volnov, Viktor Zubkov, Armenak Alachachian, Mikhail Semyonov, Arkadi Bochkarev, Viktor Kharitonov, Alexander Travin, Anatoli Astakhov, Pavel Sirotinski, Evgeni Karpov, V.Volkov, V.Kopylov (Coach: Evgeni Alexeev)

Runner-up: Rīgas ASK (USSR) Jānis Krūmiņš, Jaak Lipso, Maigonis Valdmanis, Gundars Muiznieks, Valdis Muižnieks, Juris Kalniņš, Oļģerts Hehts, Alvils Gulbis, Aivars Leonciks, Janis Davids, Ivars Veritis, Andrejs Bergs (Coach: Alexander Gomelsky)

== 1961–62 ==
CHAMPIONS CUP

Winner: Dinamo Tbilisi (USSR) Guram Minashvili, Valeri Altabaev, Aleksandre Kiladze, Vladimer Ugrekhelidze, Levan Intskirveli, Anzor Lezhava, Aleksandr Petrov, Ilarion Khazaradze, Levan Moseshvili, Revaz Gogelia, Amiran Skhiereli, Anton Kazandjian (Coach: Otar Korkia)

Runner-up: Real Madrid (Spain) Emiliano Rodríguez, Wayne Hightower, Lolo Sainz, Stan Morrison, Carlos Sevillano, Jose Lluis, Julio Descartin, Lorenzo Alocén, José Ramón Durand, Antonio Palmero, Pedro Llop, Kent McComb (Coach: Pedro Ferrándiz)

== 1962–63 ==
CHAMPIONS CUP

Winner: CSKA Moscow (USSR) Gennadi Volnov, Viktor Zubkov, Armenak Alachachian, Jaak Lipso, Yuri Korneev, Aleksandr Petrov, Alexander Travin, Arkadi Bochkarev, Anatoli Astakhov, Viacheslav Khrinin, Mikhail Semyonov, Alexander Kulkov, Alexander Shatalin (Coach: Evgeni Alexeev)

Runner-up: Real Madrid (Spain) Emiliano Rodríguez, Clifford Luyk, Lolo Sainz, Bob Burgess, Carlos Sevillano, José Ramón Durand, Lorenzo Alocén, Julio Descartin, Antonio Palmero, Jorge García, Arsenio Lope (Coach: Joaquín Hernández)

== 1963–64 ==
CHAMPIONS CUP

Winner: Real Madrid (Spain) Emiliano Rodríguez, Clifford Luyk, Bob Burgess, Bill Hanson, Lolo Sainz, Carlos Sevillano, José Ramón Durand, Julio Descartin, Moncho Monsalve, Antonio Palmero, Ignacio San Martin (Coach: Joaquín Hernández)

Runner-up: TJ Spartak ZJS Brno (Czechoslovakia) František Konvička, Vladimír Pištělák, Zdeněk Bobrovský, Jan Bobrovský, Zdeněk Konečný, František Pokorný, Zdenek Vlk, Stanislav Milota, Tomas Jambor, Ivo Dubs, Martin Nuchalik, Cvrkal (Coach: Ivo Mrazek)

== 1964–65 ==
CHAMPIONS CUP

Winner: Real Madrid (Spain) Emiliano Rodríguez, Clifford Luyk, Bob Burgess, Lolo Sainz, Jim Scott, Carlos Sevillano, Julio Descartin, José Ramón Durand, Moncho Monsalve, Miguel "Che" Gonzalez, Fernando Modrego, Jorge García (Coach: Pedro Ferrándiz)

Runner-up: CSKA Moscow (USSR) Gennadi Volnov, Viktor Zubkov, Armenak Alachachian, Jaak Lipso, Yuri Korneev, Anatoli Astakhov, Alexander Travin, Oleg Borodin, Alexander Kulkov, Gennadi Chechuro, Arkadi Bochkarev, Vadim Kapranov, I.Brjanov (Coach: Evgeni Alexeev)

== 1965–66 ==
CHAMPIONS CUP

Winner: Olimpia Simmenthal Milano (Italy) Bill Bradley, Skip Thoren, Sandro Riminucci, Gabriele Vianello, Massimo Masini, Gianfranco Pieri, Giulio Iellini, Giandomenico Ongaro, Franco Longhi, Marco Binda, Luciano Gnocchi, Fenelli (Coach: Cesare Rubini)

Runner-up: TJ Slavia VS Prague (Czechoslovakia) Jiří Zídek Sr., Jiří Zedníček, Karel Baroch, Jiri Ammer, Jaroslav Kovar, Jaroslav Krivy, Jirí Štastný, Jiri Lizalek, Jiří Konopásek, Josef Kraus, Vladimír Knop, Jan Blažek, Miloš Hrádek, Jan Hummel (Coach: Jaroslav Šíp)

== 1966–67 ==
CHAMPIONS CUP

Winner: Real Madrid (Spain) Emiliano Rodríguez, Clifford Luyk, Miles Aiken, Lolo Sainz, Bob McIntyre, Carlos Sevillano, Moncho Monsalve, Vicente Paniagua, José Ramón Ramos, Cristóbal Rodríguez, Toncho Nava, Ramón Guardiola (Coach: Pedro Ferrándiz)

Runner-up: Olimpia Simmenthal Milano (Italy) Steve Chubin, Austin "Red" Robbins, Sandro Riminucci, Massimo Masini, Gabriele Vianello, Gianfranco Pieri, Giulio Iellini, Giandomenico Ongaro, Gianfranco Fantin, Franco Longhi, Marco Binda, Luciano Gnocchi (Coach: Cesare Rubini)

CUP WINNERS' CUP

Winner: Ignis Varese (Italy) Stan McKenzie, Tony Gennari, Ottorino Flaborea, Paolo Vittori, Enrico Bovone, Massimo Villetti, Dino Meneghin, Sauro Bufalini, Pierangelo Gergati, Giambattista "Nino" Cescutti, Maurizio Ossena, Roberto Gergati (Coach: Vittorio Tracuzzi)

Runner-up: Maccabi Tel Aviv (Israel) Tal Brody, Tani Cohen-Mintz, Abraham Hoffman, Joseph Leja, Amnon Avidan, Kelin Shapira, Haim Starkman, Shabi Ben-Bassat, Gabi Neumark, Gideon Freitag, Reuven Daniel, Moshe Golovey (Coach: Yehoshua Rozin)

== 1967–68 ==
CHAMPIONS CUP

Winner: Real Madrid (Spain) Emiliano Rodríguez, Clifford Luyk, Wayne Brabender, Miles Aiken, Lolo Sainz, Vicente Paniagua, Toncho Nava, Carlos Sevillano, José Ramón Ramos, Cristóbal Rodríguez, Ramón Guardiola (Coach: Pedro Ferrándiz)

Runner-up: TJ Spartak ZJS Brno (Czechoslovakia) František Konvička, Vladimír Pištělák, Jan Bobrovský, Zdeněk Bobrovský, Petr Novický, Zdenek Vlk, Tomas Jambor, Jiri Pospisil, Jiri Kovarik, Miroslav Bily, Miroslav Zanaska, Cvrkal (Coach: Ivo Mrazek)

CUP WINNERS' CUP

Winner: AEK Athens (Greece) Georgios Trontzos, Christos Zoupas, Georgios Amerikanos, Stelios Vasileiadis, Eas Larentzakis, Antonis Christeas, Lakis Tsavas, Petros Petrakis, Nikos Nesiadis, Andreas Dimitriadis, Georgios Moschos (Coach: Nikos Milas)

Runner-up: TJ Slavia VS Prague (Czechoslovakia) Jiří Zídek Sr., Jiří Růžička, Robert Mifka, Jiri Ammer, Karel Baroch, Bohumil Tomášek, Jiří Zedníček, Jaroslav Krivy, Jiří Konopásek, Jirí Štastný, Jaroslav Kovar, Jiri Lizalek, Vladimír Knop (Coach: Jirí Baumruk)

== 1968–69 ==
CHAMPIONS CUP

Winner: CSKA Moscow (USSR) Sergei Belov, Vladimir Andreev, Gennadi Volnov, Jaak Lipso, Alexander Sidjakin, Vadim Kapranov, Yuri Selikhov, Alexander Kulkov, Anatoli Astakhov, Oleg Borodin, Rudolf Nesterov, Nikolai Kovirkin, Nikolai Kruchkov, Anatoli Blik (Coach: Armenak Alachachian)

Runner-up: Real Madrid (Spain) Emiliano Rodríguez, Clifford Luyk, Wayne Brabender, Miles Aiken, Vicente Ramos, Lolo Sainz, José Ramón Ramos, Toncho Nava, Cristóbal Rodríguez, Carlos Sevillano, Vicente Paniagua, Ramón Guardiola, Rafael Rullán, Carmelo Cabrera, Jose Manuel Suero, Cesar Perera, Alberto Vinas (Coach: Pedro Ferrándiz)

CUP WINNERS' CUP

Winner: TJ Slavia VS Prague (Czechoslovakia) Jiří Zídek Sr., Jiří Růžička, Robert Mifka, Jiri Ammer, Karel Baroch, Jiří Zedníček, Jaroslav Krivy, Jiří Konopásek, Bohumil Tomášek, Jaroslav Kovar (Coach: Jaroslav Šíp)

Runner-up: Dinamo Tbilisi (USSR) Vladimer Ugrekhelidze, Zurab Sakandelidze, Mikheil Korkia, Valeri Altabaev, Anzor Lezhava, Levan Moseshvili, Amiran Skhiereli, Sergo Maghalashvili, Tamaz Chikhladze, Igor Narimanidze, Bondo Bolkvadze, T.Pitskhelauri (Coach: Levan Intskirveli / Aleksandre Kiladze)

== 1969–70 ==
CHAMPIONS CUP

Winner: Ignis Varese (Italy) Dino Meneghin, Ricky Jones, Manuel Raga, Aldo Ossola, Edoardo Rusconi, Paolo Vittori, Ottorino Flaborea, Toto Bulgheroni, Lino Paschini, Massimo Villetti, Claudio Malagoli, Giorgio Consonni (Coach: Aleksandar Nikolić)

Runner-up: CSKA Moscow (USSR) Sergei Belov, Vladimir Andreev, Alzhan Zharmukhamedov, Alexander Sidjakin, Vadim Kapranov, Valeri Miloserdov, Yuri Selikhov, Alexander Kulkov, Anatoli Blik, Nikolai Kovirkin, Vladimir Iljuk, Nikolai Kruchkov, Nikolai Gilgner, Mikhail Medvedev (Coach: Armenak Alachachian)

CUP WINNERS' CUP

Winner: AP Fides Partenope Napoli (Italy) Miles Aiken, Jim Williams, Remo Maggetti, Carlos d'Aquila, Sauro Bufalini, Giovanni Gavagnin, Francesco Ovi, Renato Abbate, Leonardo Coen, Antonio Errico, Vincenzo Errico, Manfredo Fucile (Coach: Antonio "Tonino" Zorzi)

Runner-up: Jeanne d'Arc Vichy (France) Rudy Bennett, Larry Robertson, Paul Besson, Alain Schol, Andre Jacquemot, Paul Brousse, Pierre Buisson, Georges Ithany, Robert Chapuis, Michel Gardes, Pierre Laurent, Charlie Vilela, Laux (Coach: Đorđe Andrijašević)

== 1970–71 ==
CHAMPIONS CUP

Winner: CSKA Moscow (USSR) Sergei Belov, Vladimir Andreev, Alzhan Zharmukhamedov, Ivan Edeshko, Vadim Kapranov, Alexander Kulkov, Evgeni Kovalenko, Nikolai Kovirkin, Vladimir Iljuk, Nikolai Gilgner, Yuri Selikhov, Rudolf Nesterov, Valeri Miloserdov, Nikolai Kruchkov, Boris Subbotin, Sergei Yastrebov, Vladimir Zakharov, Nikolai Bolvachev (Coach: Alexander Gomelsky)

Runner-up: Ignis Varese (Italy) Dino Meneghin, John Fultz, Aldo Ossola, Manuel Raga, Ottorino Flaborea, Edoardo Rusconi, Paolo Vittori, Ivan Bisson, Paolo Polzot, Toto Bulgheroni, Augusto d'Amico, Massimo Villetti, Lino Paschini, Giovanni Gavagnin, Giorgio Consonni (Coach: Aleksandar Nikolić)

CUP WINNERS' CUP

Winner: Olimpia Simmenthal Milano (Italy) Art Kenney, Massimo Masini, Renzo Bariviera, Giulio Iellini, Giorgio Giomo, Giuseppe "Pino" Brumatti, Mauro Cerioni, Paolo Bianchi, Giorgio Papetti, Roberto Paleari, Gaggiotti (Coach: Cesare Rubini)

Runner-up: Spartak Leningrad (USSR) Alexander Belov, Leonid Ivanov, Valeri Fjodorov, Yuri Shtukin, Vladimir Arzamaskov, Alexander Bolshakov, Evgeni Volchkov, Anatoli Yumashev, Ivan Rozhin, Ivan Dvorny, Andrei Makeev, Viacheslav Borodin, Krivoshchjokov, Potanin, Bykov (Coach: Vladimir Kondrashin)

== 1971–72 ==
CHAMPIONS CUP

Winner: Ignis Varese (Italy) Dino Meneghin, Manuel Raga, Aldo Ossola, Tony Gennari, Ottorino Flaborea, Edoardo Rusconi, Paolo Vittori, Ivan Bisson, Marino Zanatta, Graziano Malachin, Walter Vigna (Coach: Aleksandar Nikolić)

Runner-up: Jugoplastika Split (Yugoslavia) Petar Skansi, Damir Šolman, Rato Tvrdić, Mihajlo Manović, Zdenko Prug, Branko Macura, Lovre Tvrdić, Dražen Tvrdić, Duje Krstulović, Mirko Grgin, Drago Peterka, Ivo Škarić, Zoran Grašo (Coach: Branko Radović)

Semifinalist: Real Madrid (Spain) Emiliano Rodríguez, Juan Antonio Corbalán, Clifford Luyk, Wayne Brabender, Tim Muller, José Ramón Ramos, Luis Maria Prada, Vicente Ramos, Rafael Rullán, Toncho Nava, Cristóbal Rodríguez, Carmelo Cabrera, Vicente Paniagua, José Luis López Abellán, Alberto Vinas (Coach: Pedro Ferrándiz)

Semifinalist: Panathinaikos Athens (Greece) Georgios Kolokythas, Willy Kirkland, Apostolos Kontos, Christos Kefalos, Christos Iordanidis, Giannis Dimaras, Charis Papazoglou, Andreas Papantoniou, Petros Panagiotarakos, Thanasis Peppas, Andreas Haikalis, Anagnos, Zografos, Paraskevas (Coach: Kostas Mourouzis)

CUP WINNERS' CUP

Winner: Olimpia Simmenthal Milano (Italy) Art Kenney, Massimo Masini, Renzo Bariviera, Giuseppe "Pino" Brumatti, Giulio Iellini, Mauro Cerioni, Paolo Bianchi, Giorgio Giomo, Doriano Iacuzzo, Sergio Borlenghi, Marco Crisafulli, Ferrari (Coach: Cesare Rubini)

Runner-up: Crvena Zvezda Belgrade (Yugoslavia) Zoran Slavnić, Ljubodrag Simonović, Dragan Kapičić, Vladimir Cvetković, Zoran Lazarević, Goran Rakočević, Dragiša Vučinić, Ivan Sarjanović, Zoran Latifić, Risto Kubura, Božidar Pešić, Ljupče Žugić, Tihomir Pavlović, Života Bogosavljević, M. Bojanović (Coach: Bratislav Đorđević)

KORAĆ CUP

Winner: Lokomotiva Zagreb (Yugoslavia) Nikola Plećaš, Damir Rukavina, Vjeceslav Kavedžija, Rajko Gospodnetić, Milivoj Omašić, Eduard Bočkaj, Ivica Valek, Zvonko Avberšek, Dragan Kovačić, Petar Jelić, Ante Ercegović, Zdenko Grgić, Srećko Šute (Coach: Marijan Catinelli)

Runner-up: OKK Belgrade (Yugoslavia) Žarko Knežević, Blaž Kotarac, Momčilo Pažmanj, Mile Simendić, Zoran Marojević, Rajko Žižić, Kosta Grubor, Tomić, Subotić, Janjić, Kokora, Opačić, Kresović

== 1972–73 ==
CHAMPIONS CUP

Winner: Ignis Varese (Italy) Dino Meneghin, Bob Morse, Manuel Raga, Aldo Ossola, Ivan Bisson, Ottorino Flaborea, Marino Zanatta, Edoardo Rusconi, Paolo Polzot, Paolo Vittori, Massimo Lucarelli, Giorgio Chiarini, Franco Bartolucci (Coach: Aleksandar Nikolić)

Runner-up: CSKA Moscow (USSR) Sergei Belov, Vladimir Andreev, Ivan Edeshko, Alzhan Zharmukhamedov, Evgeni Kovalenko, Viktor Petrakov, Alexander Kulkov, Valeri Miloserdov, Nikolai Djachenko, Nikolai Kovirkin, Vadim Kapranov, Vladimir Iljuk, Sergei Yastrebov, Vladimir Viktorov (Coach: Alexander Gomelsky)

Semifinalist: Olimpia Simmenthal Milano (Italy) Art Kenney, Massimo Masini, Giuseppe "Pino" Brumatti, Renzo Bariviera, Giorgio Giomo, Giulio Iellini, Mauro Cerioni, Renzo Vecchiato, Paolo Bianchi, Sergio Borlenghi (Coach: Cesare Rubini)

Semifinalist: Crvena Zvezda Belgrade (Yugoslavia) Zoran Slavnić, Dragan Kapičić, Goran Rakočević, Dragiša Vučinić, Ivan Sarjanović, Božidar Pešić, Zoran Lazarević, Ljubodrag Simonović, Zoran Latifić (Coach: Bratislav Đorđević)

CUP WINNERS' CUP

Winner: Spartak Leningrad (USSR) Alexander Belov, Valeri Fjodorov, Yuri Shtukin, Leonid Ivanov, Yuri Pavlov, Alexander Bolshakov, Vladimir Yakovlev, Evgeni Volchkov, Ivan Dvorny, Sergei Kuznetsov, Andrei Makeev, Ivan Rozhin, Mikhail Silantev, Vladimir Arzamaskov (Coach: Vladimir Kondrashin)

Runner-up: Jugoplastika Split (Yugoslavia) Damir Šolman, Rato Tvrdić, Branko Macura, Mihajlo Manović, Duje Krstulović, Lovre Tvrdić, Zdenko Prug, Dražen Tvrdić, Mirko Grgin, Ivo Škarić, Mlađan Tudor, Zoran Grašo (Coach: Srđan Kalember)

KORAĆ CUP

Winner: Forst Cantù (Italy) Pierluigi Marzorati, Bob Lienhard, Carlo Recalcati, Antonio Farina, Mario Beretta, Luciano Vendemini, Franco Meneghel, Fabrizio Della Fiori, Renzo Tombolato, Giorgio Cattini, Danilo Zonta (Coach: Arnaldo Taurisano)

Runner-up: Racing Maes Pils Mechelen (Belgium) Bill Drozdiak, Luc de Permentier, Jos Peeters, Bobby Kissane, Jack van Thillo, Jean Jacobs, Dutrieux (Coach: Robert Marchand)

== 1973–74 ==
CHAMPIONS CUP

Winner: Real Madrid (Spain) Juan Antonio Corbalán, Clifford Luyk, Wayne Brabender, Walter Szczerbiak, Rafael Rullán, Vicente Ramos, Carmelo Cabrera, Cristóbal Rodríguez, Vicente Paniagua, Luis Maria Prada (Coach: Pedro Ferrándiz)

Runner-up: Ignis Varese (Italy) Dino Meneghin, Bob Morse, Manuel Raga, Aldo Ossola, Ivan Bisson, Edoardo Rusconi, Marino Zanatta, Paolo Polzot, Massimo Lucarelli, Sergio Rizzi, Mauro Salvaneschi, Maurizio Gualco (Coach: Sandro Gamba)

Semifinalist: Radnički Belgrade (Yugoslavia) Dragoslav Ražnatović, Miroljub Damjanović, Milun Marović, Srećko Jarić, Dragan Vučinić, Dragan Ivković, Mile Đorđević, Milovan Tasić, Čokanović (Coach: Slobodan Ivković)

Semifinalist: AS Berck Basket (France) Ken Gardner, Bob Cheeks, Jean-Pierre Sailly, Pierre Galle, Yves-Marie Verove, Jean Caulier, Didier Dobbels, Jean Racz, Jean Galle, Patrick Caresse, Bernard Bryl, Patrick Platteau (Coach: Jean Galle)

CUP WINNERS' CUP

Winner: Crvena Zvezda Belgrade (Yugoslavia) Zoran Slavnić, Dragan Kapičić, Ljubodrag Simonović, Dragiša Vučinić, Radivoje Živković, Ivan Sarjanović, Goran Rakočević, Zoran Lazarević, Dragoje Jovašević, Ljupče Žugić, Božidar Pešić, Zoran Latifić, Vesko Pajović (Coach: Aleksandar Nikolić)

Runner-up: TJ Spartak ZJS Brno (Czechoslovakia) Kamil Brabenec, Jan Bobrovský, Petr Novický, Jaroslav Beranek, Jiří Balaštík, Vojtěch Petr, Jiri Pospisil, Jaroslav Stehlik, Michal Arpas, Vaclav Sramek, Ludvik David, Hrubec (Coach: František Konvička)

KORAĆ CUP

Winner: Forst Cantù (Italy) Pierluigi Marzorati, Bob Lienhard, Carlo Recalcati, Fabrizio Della Fiori, Antonio Farina, Franco Meneghel, Mario Beretta, Renzo Tombolato, Giorgio Cattini, Riccardo Santolini, Guanziroli, Giorni (Coach: Arnaldo Taurisano)

Runner-up: Partizan Belgrade (Yugoslavia) Dražen Dalipagić, Dragan Kićanović, Dragan Đukić, Dragan Todorić, Žarko Zečević, Josip Farčić, Dušan Kerkez, Boris Beravs, Branimir Popović, Goran Latifić, Zoran Marković, Marko Martinović (Coach: Ranko Žeravica)

== 1974–75 ==
CHAMPIONS CUP

Winner: Ignis Varese (Italy) Bob Morse, Charlie Yelverton, Dino Meneghin, Aldo Ossola, Ivan Bisson, Marino Zanatta, Edoardo Rusconi, Sergio Rizzi, Mauro Salvaneschi, Enzo Carraria, Maurizio Gualco, Bessi, Lepori (Coach: Sandro Gamba)

Runner-up: Real Madrid (Spain) Juan Antonio Corbalán, Clifford Luyk, Wayne Brabender, Walter Szczerbiak, Rafael Rullán, Carmelo Cabrera, Vicente Ramos, Cristóbal Rodríguez, Luis Maria Prada, Vicente Paniagua, Samuel Puente, José Manuel Beirán (Coach: Pedro Ferrándiz)

Semifinalist: KK Zadar (Yugoslavia) Krešimir Ćosić, Josip Đerđa, Doug Richards, Nedeljko Ostarčević, Čedomir Perinčić, Branko Skroče, Zdravko Jerak, Bruno Marcelić, Tomislav Matulović (Coach: Lucijan Valčić)

Semifinalist: AS Berck Basket (France) Joby Wright, Mike Stewart, Didier Dobbels, Jean-Pierre Sailly, Pierre Galle, Jean Racz, Yves Douchain, Jean Caulier, Didier Fourquet, Bernard Bryl (Coach: Jean Galle)

CUP WINNERS' CUP

Winner: Spartak Leningrad (USSR) Alexander Belov, Vladimir Arzamaskov, Alexander Bolshakov, Yuri Shtukin, Mikhail Silantev, Yuri Pavlov, Leonid Ivanov, Sergei Kuznetsov, Andrei Makeev, Valeri Fjodorov, Vladimir Yakovlev, Viacheslav Borodin (Coach: Vladimir Kondrashin)

Runner-up: Crvena Zvezda Belgrade (Yugoslavia) Zoran Slavnić, Ljubodrag Simonović, Dragan Kapičić, Radivoje Živković, Dragiša Vučinić, Žarko Koprivica, Goran Rakočević, Ivan Sarjanović, Dragoje Jovašević, Vesko Pajović, Zoran Lazarević, Božidar Pešić, Dušan Spasojević, Vladan Grujičić (Coach: Nemanja Đurić)

KORAĆ CUP

Winner: Forst Cantù (Italy) Pierluigi Marzorati, Bob Lienhard, Carlo Recalcati, Fabrizio Della Fiori, Antonio Farina, Franco Meneghel, Mario Beretta, Renzo Tombolato, Giorgio Cattini, Silvano Cancian, Roberto Natalini, Bruno Carapacchi (Coach: Arnaldo Taurisano)

Runner-up: FC Barcelona (Spain) Lawrence McCray, Randy Knowles, Manuel "Manolo" Flores, Gregorio "Goyo" Estrada, Jesús Iradier, Miguel Lopez Abril, Herminio San Epifanio, Marcelino "Marcelo" Segarra, Norman Carmichael, Juan Francisco Farelo, Jorge García, Pedro Guimera, Charles Thomas, Javier Mendiburu (Coach: Ranko Žeravica)

== 1975–76 ==
CHAMPIONS CUP

Winner: Mobilgirgi Varese (Italy) Dino Meneghin, Bob Morse, Bill Campion, Aldo Ossola, Giulio Iellini, Marino Zanatta, Ivan Bisson, Mauro Salvaneschi, Sergio Rizzi, Maurizio Gualco, Enzo Carraria, Stefano Bechini, Alberto Mottini, Riccardo Montesi (Coach: Sandro Gamba)

Runner-up: Real Madrid (Spain) Juan Antonio Corbalán, Clifford Luyk, Wayne Brabender, Walter Szczerbiak, John Coughran, Rafael Rullán, Vicente Ramos, Carmelo Cabrera, Cristóbal Rodríguez, Luis Maria Prada, Vicente Paniagua, Julio Jimenez, José Luis Logroño (Coach: Lolo Sainz)

Semifinalist: Forst Cantù (Italy) Bob Lienhard, John Grochowalski, Pierluigi Marzorati, Carlo Recalcati, Fabrizio Della Fiori, Franco Meneghel, Mario Beretta, Renzo Tombolato, Giorgio Cattini, Daniele Pirovano, Roberto Natalini (Coach: Arnaldo Taurisano)

Semifinalist: ASVEL Villeurbanne (France) Roger Moore, Bob Purkhiser, Bob Lackey, Alain Gilles, Philippe Haquet, Jean-Pierre Jouffray, Mamadou M'Baye, Michel Duprez, Gérard Lespinasse (Coach: André Buffière)

CUP WINNERS' CUP

Winner: Olimpia Cinzano Milano (Italy) Mike Sylvester, Austin "Red" Robbins, Giuseppe "Pino" Brumatti, Paolo Bianchi, Antonio Francescatto, Sergio Borlenghi, Vittorio Ferracini, Franco Boselli, Maurizio Borghese, Maurizio Benatti, Dino Boselli, Vittorio Gallinari, Paolo Friz, Marino Sabatini, Carlo Fabbricatore (Coach: Filippo "Pippo" Faina)

Runner-up: ASPO Tours (France) Jean-Michel Sénégal, Randle "L.C." Bowen, Eric Bonneau, Robert "Ray" Reynolds, DeWitt Menyard, Marc Bellot, Michel Bergeron, Patrick Demars, Christian Albert, Jean-Louis Vacher, Henri Barre, Daniel Boué (Coach: Pierre Dao)

KORAĆ CUP

Winner: Jugoplastika Split (Yugoslavia) Željko Jerkov, Rato Tvrdić, Mlađan Tudor, Mirko Grgin, Duje Krstulović, Branko Macura, Ivo Bilanović, Ivo Škarić, Branko Stamenković, Ivica Dukan, Mihajlo Manović, Slobodan Bjelajac, Damir Šolman, Drago Peterka (Coach: Petar Skansi)

Runner-up: Chinamartini Torino (Italy) John Laing, Bruno Riva, Alberto Marietta, Aldo Cervino, Alberto Merlati, Salvatore delli Carri, Matteo Mitton, Roberto Paleari, Ernesto Cima, Cesare Celoria, Francesco Carucci, Carlos Mina (Coach: Augusto Giomo)

== 1976–77 ==
CHAMPIONS CUP

Winner: Maccabi Tel Aviv (Israel) Mickey Berkowitz, Jim Boatwright, Lou Silver, Aulcie Perry, Tal Brody, Motti Aroesti, Shuki Schwartz, Bob Griffin, Eric Menkin, Eyal Yaffe, Hanan Indibo, Eran Arad (Coach: Ralph Klein)

Runner-up: Mobilgirgi Varese (Italy) Dino Meneghin, Bob Morse, Aldo Ossola, Randy Meister, Ivan Bisson, Giulio Iellini, Marino Zanatta, Sergio Rizzi, Stefano Bechini, Antonio Campiglio, Alberto Mottini, Fabio Colombo, Marco Dellacà, Enzo Pozzati, Rich Rinaldi, Daniele Bellini (Coach: Sandro Gamba)

Third: CSKA Moscow (USSR) Sergei Belov, Anatoli Myshkin, Alzhan Zharmukhamedov, Ivan Edeshko, Stanislav Eremin, Evgeni Kovalenko, Valeri Miloserdov, Viktor Petrakov, Sergei Kovalenko, Aleksandr Meleshkin (Coach: Alexander Gomelsky)

Fourth: Real Madrid (Spain) Juan Antonio Corbalán, Clifford Luyk, Wayne Brabender, Walter Szczerbiak, John Coughran, Vicente Ramos, Rafael Rullán, Luis Maria Prada, Juan Manuel López Iturriaga, Fernando Romay, Carmelo Cabrera, Vicente Paniagua, Cristóbal Rodríguez (Coach: Lolo Sainz)

CUP WINNERS' CUP

Winner: Forst Cantù (Italy) Pierluigi Marzorati, Bob Lienhard, Hart Wingo, Carlo Recalcati, Fabrizio Della Fiori, Franco Meneghel, Renzo Tombolato, Giorgio Cattini, Roberto Natalini, Umberto Cappelletti, Giampiero Cortinovis, Bruno Carapacchi, Prezzati (Coach: Arnaldo Taurisano)

Runner-up: Radnički Belgrade (Yugoslavia) Srećko Jarić, Milun Marović, Miroljub Damjanović, Dragan "Dragi" Ivković, Miroljub "Mile" Stanković, Dragan Vučinić, Zoran Prelević, Milovan Tasić, Dušan Župančić, Branko Banjanin, Dušan Živanović, Pavle Živanović, Miroslav "Mile" Đorđević (Coach: Milan Vasojević)

KORAĆ CUP

Winner: Jugoplastika Split (Yugoslavia) Željko Jerkov, Rato Tvrdić, Damir Šolman, Mihajlo Manović, Duje Krstulović, Mlađan Tudor, Mirko Grgin, Ivo Bilanović, Branko Macura, Ivica Dukan, Slobodan Bjelajac, Ivan Sunara, Predrag Kruščić, Mladen Bratić, Deni Kuvačić (Coach: Petar Skansi)

Runner-up: Fortitudo Alco Bologna (Italy) Marco Bonamico, Carlos Alberto Raffaelli, Fessor Leonard, Giovanni Biondi, Fulvio Polesello, Franco Arrigoni, Loris Benelli, Massimo Casanova, Mauro Stagni, Giampaolo Orlandi, Maurizio Ferro, Baldelli (Coach: John McMillen)

== 1977–78 ==
CHAMPIONS CUP

Winner: Real Madrid (Spain) Juan Antonio Corbalán, Wayne Brabender, Walter Szczerbiak, John Coughran, Clifford Luyk, Rafael Rullán, Carmelo Cabrera, Juan Manuel López Iturriaga, Luis Maria Prada, Vicente Ramos, Fernando Romay, Cristóbal Rodríguez, Samuel Puente, Joseba Gaztañaga (Coach: Lolo Sainz)

Runner-up: Mobilgirgi Varese (Italy) Dino Meneghin, Bob Morse, Charlie Yelverton, Aldo Ossola, Marino Zanatta, Ivan Bisson, Edoardo Rusconi, Stefano Bechini, Antonio Campiglio, Riccardo Caneva, Fabio Colombo, Marco Dellaca, Carlo Rossetti, Enzo Pozzati, Diego Tosarini (Coach: Nicola "Nico" Messina)

Third: ASVEL Villeurbanne (France) Alain Gilles, Charles Jordan, Bob Purkhiser, Philippe Recoura, Alain Vincent, Ted Evans, Philippe Haquet, Bruno Recoura, Daniel Haquet (Coach: André Buffière)

Fourth: Maccabi Tel Aviv (Israel) Aulcie Perry, Jim Boatwright, Lou Silver, Mickey Berkowitz, Tal Brody, Motti Aroesti, Bob Griffin, Hanan Keren, Bob Fleischer, Shuki Schwartz, Eric Menkin (Coach: Ralph Klein)

CUP WINNERS' CUP

Winner: Gabetti Cantù (Italy) Pierluigi Marzorati, Hart Wingo, Bob Lienhard, Carlo Recalcati, Fabrizio Della Fiori, Renzo Tombolato, Franco Meneghel, Giuseppe Gergati, Denis Innocentin, Umberto Cappelletti, Fausto Bargna, Antonello Riva, Fabio Brambilla, Giorgio Panzini, Davide Bertazzini (Coach: Arnaldo Taurisano)

Runner-up: Virtus Sinudyne Bologna (Italy) Terry Driscoll, John Roche, Marco Bonamico, Gianni Bertolotti, Renato Villalta, Carlo Caglieris, Massimo Antonelli, Mario Martini, Marco Baraldi, Mario Porto, Alessandro Goti, Marco Pedrotti, Ugo Govoni, Francesco Cantamessi (Coach: Dan Peterson)

KORAĆ CUP

Winner: Partizan Belgrade (Yugoslavia) Dražen Dalipagić, Dragan Kićanović, Miodrag Marić, Jadran Vujačić, Boban Petrović, Dragan Todorić, Dušan Kerkez, Boris Beravs, Milenko Babić, Milenko Savović, Arsenije Pešić, Milan Medić, Predrag Bojić, Dušan Rastović, Zoran Krečković, Tešić (Coach: Ranko Žeravica)

Runner-up: Bosna Sarajevo (Yugoslavia) Mirza Delibašić, Žarko Varajić, Sabit Hadžić, Ratko Radovanović, Sabahudin Bilalović, Svetislav Pešić, Predrag Benaček, Ante Đogić, Boško Bosiočić, Rođeni Krvavac, Mladen Ostojić, Dragan Zrno, Nihad Izić, Sulejman Duraković, Dževad Pašić (Coach: Bogdan Tanjević)

== 1978–79 ==
CHAMPIONS CUP

Winner: Bosna Sarajevo (Yugoslavia) Mirza Delibašić, Žarko Varajić, Svetislav Pešić, Sabahudin Bilalović, Sabit Hadžić, Predrag Benaček, Ratko Radovanović, Bosko Bosiočić, Ante Đogić, Nihad Izić, Dragan Zrno, Boro Vučević, Almir Dervišbegović, Sulejman Duraković (Coach: Bogdan Tanjević)

Runner-up: Emerson Varese (Italy) Dino Meneghin, Bob Morse, Charlie Yelverton, Aldo Ossola, Giuseppe Gergati, Maurizio Gualco, Fabio Colombo, Marco Dellaca, Enzo Carraria, Edoardo Rusconi, Riccardo Caneva, Diego Tosarini, Reschini Buzzi (Coach: Edoardo Rusconi)

Third: Maccabi Tel Aviv (Israel) Aulcie Perry, Jim Boatwright, Lou Silver, Paul McCracken, Mickey Berkowitz, Motti Aroesti, Eric Menkin, Hanan Keren, Shuki Schwartz, Shmuel Zysman (Coach: Ralph Klein)

Fourth: Real Madrid (Spain) Juan Antonio Corbalán, Wayne Brabender, Walter Szczerbiak, Randy Meister, Rafael Rullán, Juan Manuel López Iturriaga, Carmelo Cabrera, Luis Maria Prada, Josean Querejeta, Cristóbal Rodríguez, José Manuel Beirán, Joseba Gaztañaga (Coach: Lolo Sainz)

CUP WINNERS' CUP

Winner: Gabetti Cantù (Italy) Pierluigi Marzorati, John Neumann, Dave Batton, Carlo Recalcati, Fabrizio Della Fiori, Renzo Bariviera, Renzo Tombolato, Denis Innocentin, Umberto Cappelletti, Antonello Riva, Giorgio Panzini, Porro (Coach: Arnaldo Taurisano)

Runner-up: EBBC Den Bosch (Netherlands) Kees Akerboom, Dan Cramer, James Lister, Charles Kirkland, Al Faber, Jan Dekker, Rob Van Essen, John van Vliet, Theo Kropman, Maarten Konings, Peter Pijnenburg (Coach: Ton Boot)

KORAĆ CUP

Winner: Partizan Belgrade (Yugoslavia) Dragan Kićanović, Miodrag Marić, Boban Petrović, Arsenije Pešić, Dragan Todorić, Jadran Vujačić, Dušan Kerkez, Milenko Babić, Boris Beravs, Goran Knežević, Milenko Savović, Milan Medić, Predrag Bojić (Coach: Dušan Ivković)

Runner-up: Sebastiani Arrigoni AMG Rieti (Italy) Willie Sojourner, Cliff Meely, Roberto Brunamonti, Domenico Zampolini, Giampiero Torda, Adolfo Marisi, Gianfranco Sanesi, Mauro Cerioni, Enrico Pettinari, Luciano Mancin, Antonio Olivieri, Claudio di Fazi, Mariano Bernardinetti (Coach: Elio Pentassuglia)

== 1979–80 ==
CHAMPIONS CUP

Winner: Real Madrid (Spain) Juan Antonio Corbalán, Wayne Brabender, Walter Szczerbiak, Randy Meister, Rafael Rullán, Luis Maria Prada, José Manuel Beirán, José Luis Llorente, Josean Querejeta, Juan Manuel López Iturriaga, Fernando Romay, Fede Ramiro (Coach: Lolo Sainz)

Runner-up: Maccabi Tel Aviv (Israel) Aulcie Perry, Mickey Berkowitz, Earl Williams, Jim Boatwright, Lou Silver, Motti Aroesti, Shmuel Zysman, Hanan Keren, Shuki Schwartz, Hanan Dobrish, Amnon Garah, Moshe Shabtay (Coach: Ralph Klein)

Third: Bosna Sarajevo (Yugoslavia) Mirza Delibašić, Žarko Varajić, Sabit Hadžić, Ratko Radovanović, Predrag Benaček, Boro Vučević, Emir Mutapčić, Boško Bosiočić, Dragan Zrno, Nihad Izić (Coach: Bogdan Tanjević)

Fourth: Virtus Sinudyne Bologna (Italy) Krešimir Ćosić, Jim McMillan, Renato Villalta, Carlo Caglieris, Gianni Bertolotti, Mario Martini, Piero Valenti, Pietro Generali, Francesco Cantamessi, Ugo Govoni, Massimo Marchetti, Maurizio Pedretti, Ferdinando Possemato (Coach: Terry Driscoll)

CUP WINNERS' CUP

Winner: Emerson Varese (Italy) Dino Meneghin, Bob Morse, Bruce Seals, Aldo Ossola, Alberto Mottini, Maurizio Gualco, Enzo Carraria, Fabio Colombo, Mauro Salvaneschi, Antonio Campiglio, Riccardo Caneva, Marco Bergonzoni (Coach: Edoardo Rusconi)

Runner-up: Gabetti Cantù (Italy) Pierluigi Marzorati, Antonello Riva, Bruce Flowers, Wayne Smith, Renzo Tombolato, Renzo Bariviera, Giorgio Cattini, Giuseppe Gergati, Mario Beretta, Denis Innocentin, Giuseppe Bosa, Porro (Coach: Valerio Bianchini)

KORAĆ CUP

Winner: Sebastiani Arrigoni AMG Rieti (Italy) Willie Sojourner, Lee Johnson, Roberto Brunamonti, Giuseppe Danzi, Alberto Scodavolpe, Gianfranco Sanesi, Antonio Olivieri, Luca Blasetti, Mauro Antonelli, Stefano Colantoni, Claudio di Fazi, Mauro Bonino, Antonio Coppola (Coach: Elio Pentassuglia)

Runner-up: Cibona Zagreb (Yugoslavia) Aleksandar Petrović, Andro Knego, Mihovil Nakić, Sven Ušić, Damir Pavličević, Srebrenko Despot, Rajko Gospodnetić, Adnan Bečić, Dražen Dogan, Branko Sikirić, Akik, Uzelac (Coach: Mirko Novosel)

== 1980–81 ==
CHAMPIONS CUP

Winner: Maccabi Tel Aviv (Israel) Aulcie Perry, Mickey Berkowitz, Jim Boatwright, Lou Silver, Earl Williams, Motti Aroesti, Shuki Schwartz, Shmuel Zysman, Moshe Hershkowitz, Hanan Keren, Hanan Dobrish, Amnon Garah (Coach: Rudy D'Amico)

Runner-up: Virtus Sinudyne Bologna (Italy) Marco Bonamico, Jim McMillan, Marcos Leite "Marquinhos", Renato Villalta, Piero Valenti, Carlo Caglieris, Pietro Generali, Francesco Cantamessi, Mario Martini, Mario Porto, Marco Tirel, Ferdinando Possemato, Augusto Binelli, Augusto Conti (Coach: Ettore Zuccheri / Renzo Ranuzzi / Aleksandar Nikolić)

Third: Nashua EBBC Den Bosch (Netherlands) Kees Akerboom, Dan Cramer, Al Faber, Tom Barker, Jan Dekker, Charles Kirkland, Rob van Essen, Jelle Esveldt, Theo Kropman, Maurice Govers (Coach: Bill Sheridan)

Fourth: Bosna Sarajevo (Yugoslavia) Žarko Varajić, Ratko Radovanović, Sabahudin Bilalović, Sabit Hadžić, Predrag Benaček, Boro Vučević, Emir Mutapčić, Nihad Izić, Miroljub Mitrović, Ante Đogić, Boško Bosiočić (Coach: Bogdan Tanjević)

CUP WINNERS' CUP

Winner: Squibb Cantù (Italy) Pierluigi Marzorati, Antonello Riva, Bruce Flowers, Tom Boswell, Terry Stotts, Renzo Bariviera, Renzo Tombolato, Denis Innocentin, Giorgio Cattini, Umberto Cappelletti, Eugenio Masolo, Antonio Sala, Giuseppe Bosa, Valerio Fumagalli (Coach: Valerio Bianchini)

Runner-up: FC Barcelona (Spain) Juan Antonio San Epifanio, Chicho Sibilio, Nacho Solozabal, Jeff Ruland, Mike Phillips, Joan "Chichi" Creus, Juan Domingo de la Cruz, Pedro Cesar Ansa, Manuel "Manolo" Flores, Javier Puig, Juan Ramón Fernández, Joan Pages, Carlos Farfan, Miguel Tarin (Coach: Antoni Serra)

KORAĆ CUP

Winner: Joventut Badalona (Spain) Al Skinner, Joe Galvin, Luis Miguel Santillana, Jose Maria Margall, Gonzalo Sagi-Vela, Ernesto Delgado, German Gonzalez, Francisco "Paco" Sole, Jordi Villacampa, Antonio "Toni" Pruna, Javier "Tato" Abadia, Alberto Pujol (Coach: Manel Comas)

Runner-up: Carrera Reyer Venezia (Italy) Dražen Dalipagić, Spencer Haywood, Andrea Gracis, Fabrizio Della Fiori, Giovanni Grattoni, Lorenzo Carraro, Luigi Serafini, Stefano Gorghetto, Angelo Bianchini, Luca Silvestrin, Michele Marella, Claudio Soro (Coach: Antonio "Tonino" Zorzi)

== 1981–82 ==
CHAMPIONS CUP

Winner: Squibb Cantù (Italy) Pierluigi Marzorati, Antonello Riva, Bruce Flowers, Charles Kupec, Denis Innocentin, Giorgio Cattini, Fausto Bargna, Renzo Bariviera, Umberto Cappelletti, Eugenio Masolo, Antonio Sala, Giuseppe Bosa, Valerio Fumagalli, Marco Martin (Coach: Valerio Bianchini)

Runner-up: Maccabi Tel Aviv (Israel) Aulcie Perry, Mickey Berkowitz, Lou Silver, Earl Williams, Motti Aroesti, Jack Zimmerman, Howard Lassoff, Hanan Keren, Moshe Hershkowitz, Haim Markowitz, Itamar Stern, Baruch Smoler, Yuval Ben-Mordechai, Dror Tzeplovitz (Coach: Ralph Klein)

Third: Partizan Belgrade (Yugoslavia) Dražen Dalipagić, Zoran Slavnić, Boban Petrović, Goran Grbović, Miodrag Marić, Arsenije Pešić, Milenko Savović, Stevan Medić, Nebojša Zorkić, Dušan Kerkez, Goran Ristanović, Nebojša Lazarević (Coach: Boris Ćorković)

Fourth: FC Barcelona (Spain) Juan Antonio San Epifanio, Chicho Sibilio, Nacho Solozabal, Mike Phillips, Lars Erik Hansen, Joan "Chichi" Creus, Manuel "Manolo" Flores, Juan Domingo de la Cruz, Pedro Cesar Ansa, Juan Ramón Fernández, Miguel Tarin (Coach: Antoni Serra)

CUP WINNERS' CUP

Winner: Cibona Zagreb (Yugoslavia) Krešimir Ćosić, Aleksandar Petrović, Andro Knego, Zoran Čutura, Mihovil Nakić, Damir Pavličević, Sven Ušić, Rajko Gospodnetić, Adnan Bečić, Mladan Cetinja, Toni Bevanda, Srđan Savović (Coach: Mirko Novosel)

Runner-up: Real Madrid (Spain) Mirza Delibašić, Juan Antonio Corbalán, Wayne Brabender, Fernando Martín, Joe Chrnelich, Fernando Romay, Rafael Rullán, Juan Manuel López Iturriaga, José Luis Llorente, Indio Diaz, Javier Garcia Coll, Oscar Luis Pena, Guillermo Hernangómez, Pedro Rodriguez, Ion Imanol Rementeria (Coach: Lolo Sainz)

KORAĆ CUP

Winner: CSP Limoges (France) Eddy Murphy, Richard Dacoury, Jean-Michel Sénégal, Irv Kiffin, Apollo Faye, Jean-Luc Deganis, Yves-Marie Verove, Didier Rose, Richard Billet, Philippe Koundrioukoff, Eric Narbonne, Benoit Tremouille (Coach: André Buffière)

Runner-up: Šibenka Šibenik (Yugoslavia) Dražen Petrović, Branko Macura, Srećko Jarić, Živko Ljubojević, Željko Marelja, Nenad Slavica, Robert Jablan, Sreten Đurić, Fabijan Žurić, Damir Damjanić, Bruno Petani, Predrag Šarić (Coach: Faruk Kulenović)

== 1982–83 ==
CHAMPIONS CUP

Winner: Ford Cantù (Italy) Antonello Riva, Pierluigi Marzorati, Wallace Bryant, Jim Brewer, Renzo Bariviera, Giuseppe Bosa, Giorgio Cattini, Denis Innocentin, Fausto Bargna, Corrado Fumagalli, Antonio Sala (Coach: Giancarlo Primo)

Runner-up: Olimpia Billy Milano (Italy) Mike D'Antoni, Dino Meneghin, Roberto Premier, John Gianelli, Dino Boselli, Vittorio Gallinari, Vittorio Ferracini, Franco Boselli, Marco Rossi, Pierpaolo del Buono, Rinaldo Innocenti, Vincenzo Sciacca, Marco Baldi (Coach: Dan Peterson)

Third: Real Madrid (Spain) Mirza Delibašić, Dražen Dalipagić, Wayne Brabender, Juan Antonio Corbalán, Fernando Martín, Rafael Rullán, Fernando Romay, José Luis Llorente, Juan Manuel López Iturriaga, Paco Velasco, José Manuel Beirán, Pedro Rodriguez, Guillermo Hernangómez (Coach: Lolo Sainz)

Fourth: CSKA Moscow (USSR) Anatoli Myshkin, Sergei Tarakanov, Stanislav Eremin, Viktor Pankrashkin, Andrei Lopatov, Alexander Meljoshkin, Alexander Gusev, Viktor Kuzmin, Sergei Popov, Dimitri Sukharev, Anatolij Kovtun (Coach: Yuri Selikhov)

CUP WINNERS' CUP

Winner: Scavolini Pesaro (Italy) Dragan Kićanović, Željko Jerkov, Mike Sylvester, Walter Magnifico, Domenico Zampolini, Giuseppe Ponzoni, Amos Benevelli, Alessandro Boni, Massimo Bini, Gianluca del Monte, Fabio Mancini, Antonio Sassanelli (Coach: Petar Skansi)

Runner-up: ASVEL Villeurbanne (France) Philip Szanyiel, Alain Gilles, Lloyd Batts, Larry Boston, Lionel Rigo, Saint-Ange Vebobe, Alain Vincent, Patrick Haquet, Bruno Servolle, Patrick Cazemajou, Frederic Grange, Didier Martin (Coach: Alain Gilles)

KORAĆ CUP

Winner: CSP Limoges (France) Eddy Murphy, Richard Dacoury, Jean-Michel Sénégal, Glenn Mosley, Apollo Faye, Jean-Luc Deganis, Hugues Occansey, Didier Dobbels, Didier Rose, Eric Narbonne, Mathieu Faye, Olivier Garry (Coach: André Buffière)

Runner-up: Šibenka Šibenik (Yugoslavia) Dražen Petrović, Živko Ljubojević, Branko Macura, Predrag Šarić, Željko Marelja, Srećko Jarić, Nenad Slavica, Ivica Žurić, Sreten Đurić, Milan Zečević, Fabijan Žurić, Damir Damjanić, Bruno Petani (Coach: Vlade Đurović)

== 1983–84 ==
CHAMPIONS CUP

Winner: Virtus Banco di Roma (Italy) Larry Wright, Clarence Kea, Enrico Gilardi, Marco Solfrini, Fulvio Polesello, Stefano Sbarra, Renzo Tombolato, Gianni Bertolotti, Paolo Salvaggi, Tullio Sacripanti, Giuseppe Grimaldi, Paolo Scarnati, Darrell Lockhart, Roberto Paliani (Coach: Valerio Bianchini)

Runner-up: FC Barcelona (Spain) Juan Antonio San Epifanio, Chicho Sibilio, Nacho Solozabal, Mike Davis, Marcellus Starks, Luis Miguel Santillana, Juan Domingo de la Cruz, Pedro Cesar Ansa, Arturo Seara, Jordi Darde, Manuel "Manolo" Flores, Rafael Vecina (Coach: Antoni Serra)

Third: Jollycolombani Cantù (Italy) Antonello Riva, Pierluigi Marzorati, Jim Brewer, Les Craft, Denis Innocentin, Giorgio Cattini, Fausto Bargna, Giuseppe Bosa, Antonio Sala, Corrado Fumagalli (Coach: Gianni Asti)

Fourth: Bosna Sarajevo (Yugoslavia) Sabahudin Bilalović, Žarko Varajić, Sabit Hadžić, Predrag Benaček, Emir Mutapčić, Boro Vučević, Mario Primorac, Dragan Lukenda, Ante Đogić, Miroljub Mitrović, Dževad Pašić (Coach: Svetislav Pešić)

CUP WINNERS' CUP

Winner: Real Madrid (Spain) Juan Antonio Corbalán, Brian Jackson, Wayne Robinson, Fernando Martín, Rafael Rullán, Juan Manuel López Iturriaga, Fernando Romay, Antonio Martín, Paco Velasco, Juan Antonio Orenga, Wilson "Cico" Simon, Miguel Angel Marcos, José Biriukov (Coach: Lolo Sainz)

Runner-up: Olimpia Simac Milano (Italy) Mike D'Antoni, Dino Meneghin, Roberto Premier, Renzo Bariviera, Vittorio Gallinari, Marco Lamperti, Franco Boselli, Tullio de Piccoli, Andrea Blasi, Pierpaolo del Buono, Marco Baldi, Ezio Riva, Vincenzo Sciacca, Mario Pettorossi, Italo Pignolo, Earl Cureton, Antoine Carr (Coach: Dan Peterson)

KORAĆ CUP

Winner: Élan Bearnais Orthez (France) Paul Henderson, John McCullough, Benkali Kaba, Mathieu Bisseni, Christian Ortega, Freddy Hufnagel, Philippe Laperche, Pascal Laperche, Didier Gadou, Alain Gadou, Lindsay Hairston (Coach: George Fischer)

Runner-up: Crvena Zvezda Belgrade (Yugoslavia) Rajko Žižić, Slobodan Janković, Ivo Petović, Zoran Radović, Zufer Avdija, Slobodan Nikolić, Predrag Bogosavljev, Stevan Karadžić, Branko Kovačević, Mirko Milićević, Aleksandar Aleksić, Aleksandar Milivojša, Radivoje Milosavljević, Zoran Stefanović (Coach: Ranko Žeravica)

== 1984–85 ==
CHAMPIONS CUP

Winner: Cibona Zagreb (Yugoslavia) Dražen Petrović, Aleksandar Petrović, Andro Knego, Zoran Čutura, Mihovil Nakić, Sven Ušić, Branko Vukićević, Adnan Bečić, Franjo Arapović, Ivo Nakić, Igor Lukačić, Dražen Anzulović, Nebojša Razić, Ivan Šoštarec (Coach: Željko Pavličević / Mirko Novosel)

Runner-up: Real Madrid (Spain) Juan Antonio Corbalán, Wayne Robinson, Brian Jackson, Fernando Martín, Juan Manuel López Iturriaga, Fernando Romay, Rafael Rullán, Antonio Martín, Paco Velasco, Alfonso del Corral, José Biriukov (Coach: Lolo Sainz)

Third: Maccabi Tel Aviv (Israel) Kevin Magee, Aulcie Perry, Lee Johnson, Lou Silver, Mickey Berkowitz, Motti Aroesti, Hen Lippin, Moshe Hershkowitz, Howard Lassoff, Yoav Kadman, Itzhak Cohen (Coach: Zvi Sherf)

Fourth: CSKA Moscow (USSR) Vladimir Tkachenko, Sergei Tarakanov, Heino Enden, Stanislav Eremin, Valery Tikhonenko, Sergei Bazarevich, Andrei Lopatov, Viktor Pankrashkin, Aleksandr Gusev, Sergei Popov, Viktor Kuzmin, Alexander Ermolinskij (Coach: Yuri Selikhov)

CUP WINNERS' CUP

Winner: FC Barcelona (Spain) Juan Antonio San Epifanio, Chicho Sibilio, Nacho Solozabal, Mike Davis, Willie Otis Howard, Pedro Cesar Ansa, Juan Domingo de la Cruz, Arturo Seara, Julian Ortiz, Ferran Martínez, Xavi Crespo, Angel Heredero, Jose Maria Alarcon (Coach: Antoni Serra / Manuel "Manolo" Flores)

Runner-up: Žalgiris Kaunas (USSR) Arvydas Sabonis, Rimas Kurtinaitis, Valdemaras Chomičius, Sergejus Jovaiša, Algirdas Brazys, Raimundas Čivilis, Gintaras Krapikas, Mindaugas Lekarauskas, Vitoldas Masalskis, Robertas Ragauskas, Virginijus Jankauskas, Vytautas Maleras, Mindaugas Arlauskas, Algirdas Linkevičius, Raimundas Valikonis (Coach: Vladas Garastas)

KORAĆ CUP

Winner: Olimpia Simac Milano (Italy) Mike D'Antoni, Russ Schoene, Dino Meneghin, Roberto Premier, Joe Barry Carroll, Renzo Bariviera, Franco Boselli, Vittorio Gallinari, Tullio de Piccoli, Mario Pettorossi, Marco Lamperti, Mario Governa, Marco Baldi, Michele Guardascione, Riccardo Pittis, Wally Walker (Coach: Dan Peterson)

Runner-up: Ciao Crem Varese (Italy) Corny Thompson, Romeo Sacchetti, John Devereaux, Dino Boselli, Riccardo Caneva, Francesco Anchisi, Luigi Mentasti, Gianluca Guolo, Francesco Vescovi, Alberto Gatti, Alberto Prina (Coach: Riccardo Sales)

== 1985–86 ==
CHAMPIONS CUP

Winner: Cibona Zagreb (Yugoslavia) Dražen Petrović, Danko Cvjetićanin, Zoran Čutura, Mihovil Nakić, Franjo Arapović, Sven Ušić, Branko Vukićević, Damir Pavličević, Adnan Bečić, Ivo Nakić, Ivan Šoštarec, Dražen Anzulović, Nebojša Razić (Coach: Željko Pavličević)

Runner-up: Žalgiris Kaunas (USSR) Arvydas Sabonis, Valdemaras Chomičius, Rimas Kurtinaitis, Sergejus Jovaiša, Algirdas Brazys, Arūnas Visockas, Gintaras Krapikas, Raimundas Čivilis, Mindaugas Lekarauskas, Virginijus Jankauskas, Robertas Ragauskas, Vytautas Maleras (Coach: Vladas Garastas)

Third: Olimpia Simac Milano (Italy) Mike D'Antoni, Dino Meneghin, Roberto Premier, Russ Schoene, Cedric Henderson, Fausto Bargna, Vittorio Gallinari, Franco Boselli, Renzo Bariviera, Andrea Blasi (Coach: Dan Peterson)

Fourth: Real Madrid (Spain) Juan Antonio Corbalán, Wayne Robinson, Linton Townes, Fernando Martín, Rafael Rullán, Fernando Romay, Antonio Martín, Juan Manuel López Iturriaga, José Biriukov, Alfonso del Corral, Marcos Rodriguez, Juan Antonio Hernández, Marcos Carbonell (Coach: Lolo Sainz)

CUP WINNERS' CUP

Winner: FC Barcelona (Spain) Juan Antonio San Epifanio, Chicho Sibilio, Greg Wiltjer, Mark Smith, Nacho Solozabal, Juan Domingo de la Cruz, Arturo Seara, Julian Ortiz, Xavi Crespo, Steve Trumbo, Ferran Martínez, Angel Heredero, Jordi Soler, Jose Maria Alarcon (Coach: Aíto García Reneses)

Runner-up: Scavolini Pesaro (Italy) Walter Magnifico, Mike Sylvester, Zam Fredrick, Darren Tillis, Domenico Zampolini, Ario Costa, Andrea Gracis, Roberto Cipolat, Matteo Minelli, Guido Franco, Fabio Aureli, Stefano Talevi, Luca Marras, Armando Merlitti (Coach: Giancarlo Sacco)

KORAĆ CUP

Winner: Virtus Banco di Roma (Italy) Bruce Flowers, Leo Rautins, Enrico Gilardi, Marco Solfrini, Stefano Sbarra, Fulvio Polesello, Phil Melillo, Franco Rossi, Fabrizio Valente, Claudio Brunetti, Gianluca Duri, Franco Picozzi, Massimo Bastianelli (Coach: Mario de Sisti)

Runner-up: Juventus Mobilgirgi Caserta (Italy) Oscar Schmidt, Ferdinando Gentile, Sandro dell'Agnello, Horacio "Tato" Lopez, Pietro Generali, Claudio Capone, Marco Ricci, Gennaro Palmieri, Massimiliano Rizzo, Errico Chiusolo, Silla Scaranzin, Vincenzo Esposito, Francesco Longobardi (Coach: Bogdan Tanjević)

== 1986–87 ==
CHAMPIONS CUP

Winner: Olimpia Tracer Milano (Italy) Bob McAdoo, Mike D'Antoni, Dino Meneghin, Ken Barlow, Roberto Premier, Fausto Bargna, Franco Boselli, Riccardo Pittis, Vittorio Gallinari, Mario Governa, Michele Guardascione, Fabrizio Ambrassa (Coach: Dan Peterson)

Runner-up: Maccabi Tel Aviv (Israel) Kevin Magee, Lee Johnson, Doron Jamchi, Mickey Berkowitz, Motti Aroesti, Hen Lippin, Howard Lassoff, Greg Cornelius, Ido Steinberger, Meir Kaminski, Avi Schiller, Lior Arditi (Coach: Zvi Sherf)

Third: Élan Bearnais Orthez (France) Freddy Hufnagel, Howard Carter, Benkali Kaba, Tom Scheffler, Daniel Haquet, Christian Ortega, Didier Gadou, Frank Butter (Coach: George Fischer)

Fourth: KK Zadar (Yugoslavia) Stojko Vranković, Arijan Komazec, Petar Popović, Veljko Petranović, Ante Matulović, Ivica Obad, Stipe Šarlija, Branko Skroče, Darko Pahlić, Dražen Blažević, Ivan Sunara (Coach: Lucijan Valčić)

CUP WINNERS' CUP

Winner: Cibona Zagreb (Yugoslavia) Dražen Petrović, Aleksandar Petrović, Danko Cvjetićanin, Andro Knego, Zoran Čutura, Mihovil Nakić, Franjo Arapović, Sven Ušić, Branko Vukićević, Damir Pavličević, Adnan Bečić, Nebojša Razić, Ivan Šoštarec (Coach: Janez Drvarić / Mirko Novosel)

Runner-up: Scavolini Pesaro (Italy) Walter Magnifico, Zam Fredrick, Charlie Davis, Andrea Gracis, Ario Costa, Domenico Zampolini, Giuseppe Natali, Leonardo Sonaglia, Alessandro Berti, Fabio Aureli, Matteo Minelli, Guido Franco, Armando Merlitti (Coach: Giancarlo Sacco)

KORAĆ CUP

Winner: FC Barcelona (Spain) Juan Antonio San Epifanio, Chicho Sibilio, Nacho Solozabal, Andrés Jiménez, Wallace Bryant, Steve Trumbo, Juan Domingo de la Cruz, Quim Costa, Jordi Soler, Julian Ortiz, Ferran Martínez, Kenny Simpson (Coach: Aíto García Reneses)

Runner-up: CSP Limoges (France) Clarence Kea, Paul Thompson, Richard Dacoury, Stéphane Ostrowski, Jacques Monclar, Grégor Beugnot, Georges Vestris, Jean-François Evert, Alain Forestier, Hugues Occansey, Jean-Luc Hribersek, Emile Popo (Coach: Michel Gomez)

== 1987–88 ==
CHAMPIONS CUP

Winner: Olimpia Tracer Milano (Italy) Bob McAdoo, Mike D'Antoni, Ricky Brown, Dino Meneghin, Roberto Premier, Riccardo Pittis, Piero Montecchi, Massimiliano Aldi, Fausto Bargna, Mario Governa, Fabrizio Ambrassa, Alessandro Chiodini (Coach: Franco Casalini)

Runner-up: Maccabi Tel Aviv (Israel) Kevin Magee, Ken Barlow, Willie Sims, Doron Jamchi, Mickey Berkowitz, Motti Aroesti, Motti Daniel, Hen Lippin, Itzhak Cohen, Gilad Katz, Greg Cornelius (Coach: Ralph Klein)

Third: Partizan Belgrade (Yugoslavia) Vlade Divac, Žarko Paspalj, Aleksandar Đorđević, Željko Obradović, Miroslav Pecarski, Ivo Nakić, Goran Grbović, Oliver Popović, Milenko Savović, Boris Orcev, Obrad Ignjatović, Slobodan Kanjevac, Dejan Lakićević, Vujadin Jović (Coach: Duško Vujošević)

Fourth: Aris Thessaloniki (Greece) Nikos Galis, Panagiotis Giannakis, Greg Wiltjer, Slobodan-Lefteris Subotić, Michalis Romanidis, Nikos Filippou, Vassilis Lipiridis, Petros Stamatis, Dimitris Bousvaros, Georgios Doxakis, Michail Misunov, Argiris Daliaris, Georgios Kasmeridis, Vangelis Athanasiadis (Coach: Ioannis Ioannidis)

CUP WINNERS' CUP

Winner: CSP Limoges (France) Clarence Kea, Richard Dacoury, Stéphane Ostrowski, Grégor Beugnot, Hugues Occansey, Don Collins, Jacques Monclar, Georges Vestris, Jean-Luc Hribersek, Alain Forestier, Laurent Vinsou, Frederic Guinot, Franck Macaire (Coach: Michel Gomez)

Runner-up: Joventut Badalona (Spain) Jordi Villacampa, Reggie Johnson, Joe Meriweather, Rafael Jofresa, Tomás Jofresa, Jose Antonio Montero, Juan Antonio Morales, Jose Maria Margall, Jordi Pardo, Xavi Crespo, Carles Ruf, David Sole, Juan Rosa, Dani Pérez (Coach: Alfred Julbe)

KORAĆ CUP

Winner: Real Madrid (Spain) Wendell Alexis, Brad Branson, Fernando Romay, Juan Antonio Corbalán, José Biriukov, Fernando Martín, José Luis Llorente, Juan Manuel López Iturriaga, Pep Cargol, Antonio Martín, Fernando Mateo, Alfonso del Corral (Coach: Lolo Sainz)

Runner-up: Cibona Zagreb (Yugoslavia) Dražen Petrović, Danko Cvjetićanin, Franjo Arapović, Zoran Čutura, Ivan Sunara, Luka Pavićević, Branko Vukićević, Nebojša Razić, Sven Ušić, Adnan Bečić, Dražen Anzulović (Coach: Mirko Novosel)

== 1988–89 ==
CHAMPIONS CUP

Winner: Jugoplastika Split (Yugoslavia) Toni Kukoč, Dino Rađa, Duško Ivanović, Velimir Perasović, Goran Sobin, Zoran Sretenović, Žan Tabak, Luka Pavićević, Teo Čizmić, Ivica Burić, Paško Tomić, Petar Vučica (Coach: Božidar Maljković)

Runner-up: Maccabi Tel Aviv (Israel) Kevin Magee, Ken Barlow, Willie Sims, Doron Jamchi, LaVon Mercer, Hen Lippin, Motti Daniel, Itzhak Cohen, Gilad Katz, Eliezer Gordon, Uri Buch, Eran Bergstein (Coach: Zvi Sherf)

Third: Aris Thessaloniki (Greece) Nikos Galis, Panagiotis Giannakis, Slobodan-Lefteris Subotić, Greg Wiltjer, Michalis Romanidis, Nikos Filippou, Vassilis Lipiridis, Georgios Doxakis, Manthos Katsoulis, Michail Misunov, Vangelis Vourtzoumis, Petros Stamatis, Dimitris Avdalas, Larry Kapcik (Coach: Ioannis Ioannidis)

Fourth: FC Barcelona (Spain) Juan Antonio San Epifanio, Chicho Sibilio, Nacho Solozabal, Audie Norris, Andrés Jiménez, Quim Costa, Xavi Crespo, Santi Abad, Jordi Soler, Arturo Jesus Llopis, Lisard Gonzalez, Granville Stephen Waiters, Steve Trumbo, Mike Saulsberry (Coach: Aíto García Reneses)

CUP WINNERS' CUP

Winner: Real Madrid (Spain) Dražen Petrović, Johnny Rogers, Fernando Martín, José Biriukov, Antonio Martín, Pep Cargol, Fernando Romay, José Luis Llorente, Quique Villalobos, Javi Perez, Miguel Angel Cabral, Carlos Garcia Rivas (Coach: Lolo Sainz)

Runner-up: Juventus Snaidero Caserta (Italy) Oscar Schmidt, Ferdinando Gentile, Georgi Glouchkov, Vincenzo Esposito, Sandro dell'Agnello, Fulvio Polesello, Franco Boselli, Massimiliano Rizzo, Giuseppe Vitiello, Giacomantonio Tufano, Francesco Longobardi (Coach: Franco Marcelletti)

KORAĆ CUP

Winner: Partizan Belgrade (Yugoslavia) Vlade Divac, Žarko Paspalj, Aleksandar Đorđević, Predrag Danilović, Željko Obradović, Ivo Nakić, Oliver Popović, Milenko Savović, Jadran Vujačić, Miroslav Pecarski, Boris Orcev, Miladin Mutavdžić, Predrag Prlinčević, Dejan Parežanin, Vujadin Jović, Dejan Lakićević, Vladimir Bosanac (Coach: Duško Vujošević)

Runner-up: Wiwa Vismara Cantù (Italy) Antonello Riva, Pierluigi Marzorati, Kent Benson, Jeff Turner, Greg Stokes, Giuseppe Bosa, Angelo Gilardi, Enrico Milesi, Alberto Rossini, Umberto Cappelletti, Alessandro Zorzolo, Nicola Foschini, Ricky Gallon, Enrico Figlios (Coach: Carlo Recalcati)

== 1989–90 ==
CHAMPIONS CUP

Winner: Jugoplastika Split (Yugoslavia) Toni Kukoč, Dino Rađa, Zoran Savić, Velimir Perasović, Duško Ivanović, Zoran Sretenović, Goran Sobin, Žan Tabak, Luka Pavićević, Aramis Naglić, Petar Naumoski, Velibor Radović, Josip Lovrić, Teo Čizmić, Paško Tomić (Coach: Božidar Maljković)

Runner-up: FC Barcelona (Spain) Juan Antonio San Epifanio, Audie Norris, David Wood, Nacho Solozabal, Andrés Jiménez, Ferran Martínez, Quim Costa, Xavi Crespo, Claudi Martinez, Arturo Llopis, Lisard Gonzalez, Xavier Marin, Paul Thompson, Steve Trumbo, Oscar de la Torre (Coach: Aíto García Reneses)

Third: CSP Limoges (France) Richard Dacoury, Michael Brooks, Don Collins, Stéphane Ostrowski, Valéry Demory, Jimmy Verove, Georges Vestris, Ken Dancy, Pascal Jullien, Jean-Marc Setier, Frederic Astier, Stephane Dheygers, Bruno Ninet (Coach: Michel Gomez)

Fourth: Aris Thessaloniki (Greece) Nikos Galis, Panagiotis Giannakis, Mike Jones, Stojko Vranković, Slobodan-Lefteris Subotić, Michalis Romanidis, Nikos Filippou, Vassilis Lipiridis, Manthos Katsoulis, Georgios Doxakis, Kostas Baltatzis, Nikos Tsirakidis, Michail Misunov, Vangelis Vourtzoumis (Coach: Ioannis Ioannidis)

CUP WINNERS' CUP

Winner: Virtus Knorr Bologna (Italy) Micheal Ray Richardson, Clemon Johnson, Roberto Brunamonti, Augusto Binelli, Claudio Coldebella, Mike Sylvester, Lauro Bon, Vittorio Gallinari, Massimiliano Romboli, Clivo Massimo Righi, Tommaso Tasso, Davide Bonora, Andrea Cempini, Saverio Nero (Coach: Ettore Messina)

Runner-up: Real Madrid (Spain) Mike Anderson, José "Piculín" Ortiz, Anthony Frederick, Dennis Clay Nutt, José Biriukov, Fernando Romay, Antonio Martín, José Luis Llorente, Pep Cargol, Quique Villalobos, Javi Perez, Miguel Angel Cabral, Ismael Santos, Tomás González, Ben McDonald, Fernando Martín (Coach: George Karl)

KORAĆ CUP

Winner: Joventut Badalona (Spain) Jordi Villacampa, Lemone Lampley, Reggie Johnson, Jose Antonio Montero, Juan Antonio Morales, Rafael Jofresa, Tomás Jofresa, Carles Ruf, Jose Maria Margall, Dani Pérez, Antonio Medianero, Pere Joan Remon, Ferran Lopez, Robert Bellavista (Coach: Herb Brown / Pedro Martínez)

Runner-up: Scavolini Pesaro (Italy) Walter Magnifico, Darren Daye, Darwin Cook, Ario Costa, Andrea Gracis, Domenico Zampolini, Alessandro Boni, Paolo Boesso, Federico Pieri, Matteo Panichi, Michele Verderame, Kelvin Upshaw, Giulio Rossi, Paolo Calbini, Marco Cognolato, Alessandro Zanier, Cristiano Cocco (Coach: Sergio Scariolo)

== 1990–91 ==
CHAMPIONS CUP

Winner: Pop 84 Split (Yugoslavia) Toni Kukoč, Zoran Savić, Avie Lester, Velimir Perasović, Zoran Sretenović, Žan Tabak, Luka Pavićević, Aramis Naglić, Teo Čizmić, Petar Naumoski, Paško Tomić, Velibor Radović (Coach: Željko Pavličević)

Runner-up: FC Barcelona (Spain) José "Piculín" Ortiz, Audie Norris, Juan Antonio San Epifanio, Nacho Solozabal, Andrés Jiménez, Jose Antonio Montero, Jose Luis Galilea, Steve Trumbo, Xavi Crespo, Lisard Gonzalez, Roger Esteller, Angel Luis Almeida, Eduardo Bonet, Jose Maria Pedrera, Oscar de la Torre, Daniel Rovira (Coach: Božidar Maljković)

Third: Maccabi Tel Aviv (Israel) Doron Jamchi, Ed Horton, LaVon Mercer, Donald Royal, Willie Sims, Guy Goodes, Motti Daniel, Nadav Henefeld, Hen Lippin, Itzhak Cohen, Dror Berdichev, Harel Gadot (Coach: Zvi Sherf)

Fourth: Scavolini Pesaro (Italy) Walter Magnifico, Darren Daye, Darwin Cook, Ario Costa, Andrea Gracis, Domenico Zampolini, Alessandro Boni, Giovanni Grattoni, Paolo Calbini, Fernando Labella, Michele Verderame, Marco Cognolato, Elston Turner, Guido Franco, Andrea Pistilli, Riccardo Riccardini (Coach: Sergio Scariolo)

CUP WINNERS' CUP

Winner: PAOK Thessaloniki (Greece) Branislav Prelević, Ken Barlow, Panagiotis Fasoulas, Nikos Boudouris, Nikos Stavropoulos, Georgios Makaras, Panagiotis Papachronis, Memos Ioannou, Achilleas Mamatziolas, John Korfas, Georgios Valavanidis, Lazaros Tsakiris, Tom Katsikis, Nick Katsikis, Irving Thomas (Coach: Kostas Politis / Sakis Laios / Dragan Šakota)

Runner-up: CAI Zaragoza (Spain) Kevin Magee, Mark Davis, Quique Andreu, Pepe Arcega, Fernando Arcega, Paco Zapata, Joaquin Ruiz Lorente, Fran Murcia, Jose Miguel Hernandez, Dani Alvarez, Alfredo Fabon, Alberto Angulo (Coach: Chuchi Carrera / Lanny Van Eman / Manel Comas)

KORAĆ CUP

Winner: Clear Cantù (Italy) Pace Mannion, Pierluigi Marzorati, Davide Pessina, Giuseppe Bosa, Roosevelt Bouie, Alberto Rossini, Angelo Gilardi, Andrea Gianolla, Silvano dal Seno, Omar Tagliabue, Alessandro Zorzolo, Fabio Gatti, Fabio Tonini (Coach: Fabrizio Frates)

Runner-up: Real Madrid (Spain) Stanley Roberts, Carl Herrera, José Biriukov, José Luis Llorente, Antonio Martín, Pep Cargol, Fernando Romay, Quique Villalobos, Ismael Santos, Juan Aisa, Tomás González, José María Silva, Ignacio Castellanos, Jerónimo Bucero, Ricardo Peral (Coach: Wayne Brabender / Ignacio Pinedo / Angel Jareno)

== 1991–92 ==
EUROPEAN LEAGUE

Winner: Partizan Belgrade (Yugoslavia) Predrag Danilović, Aleksandar Đorđević, Ivo Nakić, Slaviša Koprivica, Zoran Stevanović, Željko Rebrača, Nikola Lončar, Vladimir Dragutinović, Mlađan Šilobad, Dragiša Šarić, Igor Mihajlovski, Igor Perović (Coach: Željko Obradović)

Runner-up: Joventut Badalona (Spain) Jordi Villacampa, Harold Pressley, Corny Thompson, Jordi Pardo, Rafael Jofresa, Tomás Jofresa, Juan Antonio Morales, Ferran Martínez, Carles Ruf, Jordi Llorens, Alfonso Albert (Coach: Lolo Sainz)

Third: Olimpia Philips Milano (Italy) Antonello Riva, Johnny Rogers, Darryl Dawkins, Riccardo Pittis, Davide Pessina, Piero Montecchi, Andrea Blasi, Marco Baldi, Fabrizio Ambrassa, Renato Biffi, Paolo Alberti (Coach: Mike D'Antoni)

Fourth: Estudiantes Madrid (Spain) Rickie Winslow, Alberto Herreros, John Pinone, Juan Antonio Orenga, Ignacio Azofra, Alfonso Reyes, Pablo Martínez, Juan Aisa, Juan Antonio Aguilar, Pedro Rodríguez, Enrique Ruiz Paz (Coach: Miguel Angel Martin)

Quarterfinalist: FC Barcelona (Spain) Zoran Savić, Ben Coleman, Juan Antonio San Epifanio, Nacho Solozabal, Jose Antonio Montero, Jose Luis Galilea, Roger Esteller, Francisco Javier Zapata, Lisard Gonzalez, Jordi Soler, Andrés Jiménez, Steve Trumbo

Quarterfinalist: Virtus Knorr Bologna (Italy) Jure Zdovc, Roberto Brunamonti, Bill Wennington, Augusto Binelli, Claudio Coldebella, Riccardo Morandotti, Lauro Bon, Roberto Cavallari, Roberto Dalla Vecchia, Massimiliano Romboli, Damiano Brigo, Michele Bertinelli

Quarterfinalist: Maccabi Tel Aviv (Israel) Doron Jamchi, Mike Mitchell, José Vargas, Lavon Byrd Curtis, Guy Goodes, Motti Daniel, Nadav Henefeld, Willie Sims, Hen Lippin, Dror Bardichev

Quarterfinalist: Cibona Zagreb (Croatia) Zdravko Radulović, Danko Cvjetićanin, Veljko Mršić, Franjo Arapović, Zoran Čutura, Goran Sobin, Andro Knego, Vladan Alanović, Ivan Sunara, Dževad Alihodžić, Mario Gašparović

EUROPEAN CUP

Winner: Real Madrid (Spain) Mark Simpson, Ricky Brown, José Biriukov, Antonio Martín, José Miguel Antúnez, Pep Cargol, José Luis Llorente, Fernando Romay, Quique Villalobos, Jonatan Angel Ojeda, José María Silva, Tomás González (Coach: Clifford Luyk)

Runner-up: PAOK Thessaloniki (Greece) Branislav Prelević, Ken Barlow, Panagiotis Fasoulas, Nikos Boudouris, Nikos Stavropoulos, Panagiotis Papachronis, Nikos Filippou, Georgios Makaras, Theodoros Asteriadis, Georgios Kouklakis, Georgios Valavanidis, Lazaros Tsakiris (Coach: Dušan Ivković)

Semifinalist: Smelt Olimpija Ljubljana (Slovenia) Dušan Hauptman, Peter Vilfan, Radisav Ćurčić, Roman Horvat, Slavko Kotnik, Žarko Đurišić, Jaka Daneu, Darko Mirt, Marijan Kraljević, Primož Bačar, Alojzij Šiško

Semifinalist: Scaligera Glaxo Verona (Italy) Tim Kempton, Russ Schoene, Paolo Moretti, Massimo Minto, Sandro Brusamarello, Giampiero Savio, Alessandro Frosini, Davide Bonora, Vittorio Gallinari, Aniello Laezza

KORAĆ CUP

Winner: Virtus Il Messaggero Roma (Italy) Dino Rađa, Rick Mahorn, Roberto Premier, Alessandro Fantozzi, Andrea Niccolai, Donato Avenia, Stefano Attruia, Fausto Bargna, Davide Croce, Gianluca Lulli (Coach: Paolo di Fonzo)

Runner-up: Scavolini Pesaro (Italy) Walter Magnifico, Darren Daye, Haywoode Workman, Andrea Gracis, Ario Costa, Alessandro Boni, Domenico Zampolini, Paolo Calbini, Giovanni Grattoni, Marco Cognolato, Federico Stefanini (Coach: Alberto Bucci)

Semifinalist: Forum Filatelico Valladolid (Spain) Arvydas Sabonis, Mike Schlegel, Miguel Angel Reyes, Lalo García, Alex Bento, Fede Ramiro, Jacobo Odriozola, Silvano Bustos, Juan Martínez, David Enciso, Raul Octavio

Semifinalist: Clear Cantù (Italy) Pace Mannion, Adrian Caldwell, Alberto Rossini, Andrea Gianolla, Giuseppe Bosa, Alberto Tonut, Angelo Gilardi, Eros Buratti, Omar Tagliabue, Alessandro Zorzolo

== 1992–93 ==
EUROPEAN LEAGUE

Winner: CSP Limoges (France) Michael Young, Jure Zdovc, Richard Dacoury, Jim Bilba, Willie Redden, Frederic Forte, Franck Butter, Duško Ivanović, Jimmy Verove, Christophe Botton, Marc M'Bahia, Jean-Marc Dupraz (Coach: Božidar Maljković)

Runner-up: Benetton Treviso (Italy) Toni Kukoč, Terry Teagle, Stefano Rusconi, Massimo Iacopini, Alberto Vianini, Nino Pellacani, Marco Mian, Maurizio Ragazzi, Germán Scarone, Riccardo Esposito, Davide Piccoli (Coach: Petar Skansi)

Third: PAOK Thessaloniki (Greece) Branislav Prelević, Cliff Levingston, Ken Barlow, John Korfas, Panagiotis Fasoulas, Nikos Boudouris, George Ballogiannis, Nikos Filippou, Georgios Kouklakis, Achilleas Mamatziolas, Christos Tsekos, Stavros Koukouditskas, Georgios Valavanidis (Coach: Dušan Ivković)

Fourth: Real Madrid (Spain) Arvydas Sabonis, Ricky Brown, José Biriukov, Pep Cargol, José Miguel Antúnez, Antonio Martín, Fernando Romay, Ismael Santos, José Lasa, José María Silva, Juan Ignacio Romero, David Brabender (Coach: Clifford Luyk)

Quarterfinalist: Virtus Knorr Bologna (Italy) Predrag Danilović, Bill Wennington, Riccardo Morandotti, Paolo Moretti, Augusto Binelli, Roberto Brunamonti, Claudio Coldebella, Flavio Carera, Damiano Brigo, Davide Diacci, Emilio Marcheselli

Quarterfinalist: Scavolini Pesaro (Italy) Walter Magnifico, Haywoode Workman, Carlton Myers, Pete Myers, Ario Costa, Andrea Gracis, Alessandro Boni, Domenico Zampolini, Pierfilippo Rossi, Matteo Panichi, Henry James

Quarterfinalist: Olympiacos Piraeus (Greece) Walter Berry, Žarko Paspalj, Dragan Tarlać, Milan Tomić, Georgios Sigalas, Georgios Limniatis, Antonios Stamatis, Georgios Papadakos, Argiris Kambouris, Charalampos Papadakis, Stavros Elliniadis, Kostas Moraitis, Franko Nakić, Rod Higgins

Quarterfinalist: Élan Béarnais Pau-Orthez (France) Gheorghe Mureșan, Howard Carter, Orlando Phillips, Valéry Demory, Thierry Gadou, Didier Gadou, Frederic Domon, Rick Doyle, Vincent Naulleau, Frédéric Fauthoux, Sebastien Gomez, Sebastian Lafargue

EUROPEAN CUP

Winner: Aris Thessaloniki (Greece) Roy Tarpley, Panagiotis Giannakis, Mitchell Anderson, Michail Misunov, Dinos Angelidis, Vangelis Vourtzoumis, Georgios Gasparis, Vassilis Lipiridis, Memos Ioannou, Igor Moraitov, Theodosios Paralikas (Coach: Zvi Sherf)

Runner-up: Efes Pilsen Istanbul (Turkey) Petar Naumoski, Larry Richard, Ufuk Sarıca, Tamer Oyguç, Volkan Aydın, Taner Korucu, Oktay Öztürk, Gökhan Güney, Tarik Sariçoban (Coach: Aydın Örs)

Semifinalist: Natwest Zaragoza (Spain) Jeff Martin, John Turner, Alberto Angulo, José Ángel Arcega, Fernando Arcega, Quique Andreu, Dani Alvarez, Fran Murcia, Santi Aldama, Lucio Angulo, Rogelio Legasa

Semifinalist: Hapoel Galil Elyon (Israel) Brad Leaf, Michael Gibson, Doron Sheffer, Andrew Kennedy, Steve Malović, Nir Matalon, Amir Muchtari, Amir Bino, Avner Yeor, Shai Dolinsky, Dror Colines

KORAĆ CUP

Winner: Olimpia Philips Milano (Italy) Aleksandar Đorđević, Antonello Riva, Antonio Davis, Riccardo Pittis, Flavio Portaluppi, Fabrizio Ambrassa, Davide Pessina, Paolo Alberti, Marco Baldi, Marco Sambugaro, Massimo Re (Coach: Mike D'Antoni)

Runner-up: Virtus Roma (Italy) Dino Rađa, Rick Mahorn, Andrea Niccolai, Alessandro Fantozzi, Sandro Dell'Agnello, Roberto Premier, Emiliano Busca, Elvis Rolle, Davide Croce, Gustavo Tolotti, Andrea Camata, Camillo Stazzonelli (Coach: Franco Casalini)

Semifinalist: FC Barcelona (Spain) Zoran Savić, Juan Antonio San Epifanio, Audie Norris, Andrés Jiménez, Roger Esteller, Jose Antonio Montero, Jose Antonio Paraiso, Jose Luis Galilea, Francisco Javier Zapata, Angel Almeida, Oliver Fuentes, Berni Tamames, Antonio Pedrera

Semifinalist: Clear Cantù (Italy) Pace Mannion, Adrian Caldwell, Alberto Tonut, Alberto Rossini, Giuseppe Bosa, Angelo Gilardi, Andrea Gianolla, Luigi Corvo, Enrico Milesi, Pietro Bianchi, Alberto Angiolini, Stefano Mantica

== 1993–94 ==
EUROPEAN LEAGUE

Winner: Joventut Badalona (Spain) Jordi Villacampa, Corny Thompson, Ferran Martínez, Mike Smith, Rafael Jofresa, Tomás Jofresa, Juan Antonio Morales, Dani Pérez, Alfonso Albert, Joffre Lleal, Daniel García, Ivan Corrales (Coach: Željko Obradović)

Runner-up: Olympiacos Piraeus (Greece) Žarko Paspalj, Roy Tarpley, Panagiotis Fasoulas, Milan Tomić, Georgios Sigalas, Franko Nakić, Efthimis Bakatsias, Georgios Limniatis, Antonis Stamatis, Argiris Kambouris, Dragan Tarlać, Georgios Papadakos, Panagiotis Karatzas (Coach: Ioannis Ioannidis)

Third: Panathinaikos Athens (Greece) Nikos Galis, Alexander Volkov, Stojko Vranković, Fragiskos Alvertis, Christos Myriounis, Kostas Patavoukas, Georgios Chrysanthopoulos, Ioannis Georgikopoulos, Giannis Papagiannis, Minas Gekos (Coach: Kostas Politis)

Fourth: FC Barcelona (Spain) Tony Massenburg, Fred Roberts, Juan Antonio San Epifanio, Andrés Jiménez, Jose Luis Galilea, Jose Antonio Montero, Quique Andreu, Xavi Crespo, Oliver Fuentes, Salva Díez, Jorge Montaner, Victor Alemany (Coach: Aíto García Reneses)

Quarterfinalist: Real Madrid (Spain) Arvydas Sabonis, Joe Arlauckas, Antonio Martín, José Biriukov, Pep Cargol, Ismael Santos, José Miguel Antúnez, José Lasa, Javier Garcia Coll, Juan Ignacio Romero

Quarterfinalist: Virtus Buckler Bologna (Italy) Predrag Danilović, Paolo Moretti, Augusto Binelli, Roberto Brunamonti, Claudio Coldebella, Riccardo Morandotti, Flavio Carera, Giampiero Savio, Damiano Brigo, Cliff Levingston, Daniele Soro, Alessandro Romboli, Andrea Giacchino

Quarterfinalist: Efes Pilsen Istanbul (Turkey) Petar Naumoski, Larry Richard, Ufuk Sarıca, Tamer Oyguç, Volkan Aydın, Taner Korucu, Oktay Öztürk, Gökhan Güney, Mustafa Kemal Bitim, Tarik Sariçoban, Faruk Rasna

Quarterfinalist: CSP Limoges (France) Michael Young, Richard Dacoury, Jim Bilba, Danny Young, Willie Redden, Frederic Forte, Marc M'Bahia, Jimmy Verove, Franck Butter, Georges Adams

EUROPEAN CUP

Winner: Smelt Olimpija Ljubljana (Slovenia) Dušan Hauptman, Roman Horvat, Boris Gorenc, Žarko Đurišić, Marko Tušek, Nebojša Razić, Marijan Kraljević, Jaka Daneu, Vitali Nosov, Klemen Zaletel (Coach: Zmago Sagadin)

Runner-up: Taugres Vitoria (Spain) Velimir Perasović, Ramón Rivas, Pablo Laso, Ken Bannister, Santi Abad, Juan Ignacio Gomez, Rafael Talaveron, Ander Chinchurreta, Juan Pedro Cazorla, Ignacio Castellanos, Carlos Cazorla, Pedro Rodríguez, San Pedro Juan Jose, Francis Powell (Coach: Manel Comas)

Semifinalist: Aris Thessaloniki (Greece) Sean Higgins, Sam Vincent, Panagiotis Liadelis, Miroslav Pecarski, Dinos Angelidis, Vangelis Vourtzoumis, Vassilis Lipiridis, Georgios Maslarinos, Michail Misunov, Georgios Gasparis, Theodosios Paralikas, Zdravko Radulović, Anthony Frederick, Igor Moraitov

Semifinalist: Pitch Cholet Basket (France) Antoine Rigaudeau, Mike Jones, José Vargas, Eric John, Bruno Coqueran, Olivier Allinei, Christophe Evano, Teddy Citadelle, Thierry Zaire, Stephane Beaudinet, Winston Crite, Athys Francis, Gilles Jehannin, Ludovic Nicolas, Jeremie Maginot

KORAĆ CUP

Winner: PAOK Thessaloniki (Greece) Zoran Savić, Walter Berry, Branislav Prelević, John Korfas, Nasos Galakteros, Nikos Boudouris, Achilleas Mamatziolas, George Ballogiannis, Christos Tsekos, Efthimis Rentzias, Georgios Valavanidis (Coach: Soulis Markopoulos)

Runner-up: Stefanel Trieste (Italy) Dejan Bodiroga, Gregor Fučka, Lemone Lampley, Ferdinando Gentile, Claudio Pilutti, Davide Cantarello, Alessandro De Pol, Jan Budin, Giuseppe Calavita, Claudio Pol Bodetto, Filippo Cattabiani, Marco Pilat, Andreas Brignoli (Coach: Bogdan Tanjević)

Semifinalist: Olimpia Recoaro Milano (Italy) Aleksandar Đorđević, Žan Tabak, Antonello Riva, Dino Meneghin, Hugo Sconochini, Flavio Portaluppi, Davide Pessina, Fabrizio Ambrassa, Paolo Alberti, Emilio Rotasperti, Francesco Veneri

Semifinalist: Panionios Athens (Greece) Ed Stokes, Henry Turner, Panagiotis Giannakis, Fanis Christodoulou, Christos Christodoulou, Dušan Jelić, Aleksandar Lazić, Georgios Bosganas, Evangelos Angelou, Georgios Karagoutis, John Fitsioris, Spyridon Panteliadis, Prodromos Dreliozis

== 1994–95 ==
EUROPEAN LEAGUE

Winner: Real Madrid (Spain) Arvydas Sabonis, Joe Arlauckas, Antonio Martín, José Miguel Antúnez, Pep Cargol, José Biriukov, Javier Garcia Coll, Ismael Santos, José Lasa, Juan Ignacio Romero, Roberto Núñez, Martin Ferrer, José María Silva (Coach: Željko Obradović)

Runner-up: Olympiacos Piraeus (Greece) Eddie Johnson, Alexander Volkov, Dragan Tarlać, Milan Tomić, Franko Nakić, Georgios Sigalas, Panagiotis Fasoulas, Efthimis Bakatsias, Argiris Kambouris, Georgios Limniatis, Georgios Papadakos, Antonis Stamatis, Charalampos Papadakis (Coach: Ioannis Ioannidis)

Third: Panathinaikos Athens (Greece) Žarko Paspalj, Nikos Galis, Stojko Vranković, Fragiskos Alvertis, Panagiotis Giannakis, Nikos Oikonomou, Miroslav Pecarski, Kostas Patavoukas, Christos Myriounis, Ioannis Papagiannis, Georgios Chrysanthopoulos, Ioannis Georgikopoulos (Coach: Efthimis Kioumourtzoglou)

Fourth: CSP Limoges (France) Michael Young, Tim Kempton, Robert Lock, Richard Dacoury, Jim Bilba, Frederic Forte, Georges Adams, Marc M'Bahia, Jerome Florenson, Abbas Sy, Jimmy Verove, Moustapha N'Doye, Bruno Croix (Coach: Božidar Maljković)

Quarterfinalist: Virtus Buckler Bologna (Italy) Predrag Danilović, Joe Binion, Paolo Moretti, Augusto Binelli, Alessandro Abbio, Flavio Carera, Roberto Brunamonti, Riccardo Morandotti, Claudio Coldebella, Valentino Battisti, Andrea Giacchino, Matteo Galeotti

Quarterfinalist: Scavolini Pesaro (Italy) Antonello Riva, Walter Magnifico, Dean Garrett, Corey Gaines, Sandro Dell'Agnello, Ario Costa, Federico Pieri, Paolo Calbini, Matteo Panichi, Enrico Gaeta, Fabrizio Facenda, Michele Maggioli, Christian Ferretti

Quarterfinalist: CSKA Moscow (Russia) Vasily Karasev, Evgeni Kisurin, Igor Kudelin, Patrick Eddie, Sergei Panov, Chuck Evans, Sergei Grezin, Andrei Spiridonov, Andrei Kornev, Nikita Morgunov, Igor Kurashov, Alexei Vadeev

Quarterfinalist: Cibona Zagreb (Croatia) Veljko Mršić, Gerrod Abram, Vladan Alanović, Slaven Rimac, Davor Marcelić, Dževad Alihodžić, Davor Pejčinović, Ivica Žurić, Alan Gregov, Damir Mulaomerović, Željko Poljak, Marin Prskalo, Vladimir Jakšić

EUROPEAN CUP

Winner: Benetton Treviso (Italy) Petar Naumoski, Orlando Woolridge, Ken Barlow, Stefano Rusconi, Riccardo Pittis, Massimo Iacopini, Andrea Gracis, Denis Marconato, Alberto Vianini, Riccardo Esposito, Maurizio Ragazzi, Federico Peruzzo, Paolo Casonato (Coach: Mike D'Antoni)

Runner-up: Taugres Vitoria (Spain) Velimir Perasović, Kenny Green, Ramón Rivas, Pablo Laso, Marcelo Nicola, Santi Abad, Carlos Cazorla, Jordi Grau, Juan Ignacio Gomez, Rafael Talaveron, Pedro Rodríguez, Ferran Lopez, Jorge Garbajosa, Juan Pedro Cazorla (Coach: Manel Comas)

Semifinalist: Olympique d'Antibes (France) David Rivers, Micheal Ray Richardson, Stéphane Ostrowski, Laurent Foirest, Willie Redden, Billy Joe Williams, Arsene Ade Mensah, Frederic Domon, Jean-Philippe Methelie, Cheikhou N'Diaye, Remi Fagot

Semifinalist: Iraklis Thessaloniki (Greece) Walter Berry, Jure Zdovc, Lefteris Kakiousis, Panagiotis Papachronis, Kostas Moraitis, Aristides Holopoulos, Nikos Kouvelas, Christos Kountourakis, Konstantinos Tampakis, Nicolaos Panagiotides, Georgios Giannouzakos

KORAĆ CUP

Winner: Alba Berlin (Germany) Teoman Alibegović, Saša Obradović, Gunther Behnke, Henrik Rödl, Ingo Freyer, Ademola Okulaja, Stephan Baeck, Teoman Öztürk, Sebastian Machowski, Patrick Falk, Oliver Braun (Coach: Svetislav Pešić)

Runner-up: Olimpia Stefanel Milano (Italy) Dejan Bodiroga, Gregor Fučka, Ferdinando Gentile, Alessandro De Pol, Davide Pessina, Flavio Portaluppi, Hugo Sconochini, Paolo Alberti, Davide Cantarello, Fulvio Fantetti, Alec Kessler, Francesco Veneri, Matteo Maggioni, Carlo Maurović (Coach: Bogdan Tanjević)

Semifinalist: Élan Béarnais Pau-Orthez (France) Conrad McRae, Rickie Winslow, Howard Carter, Didier Gadou, Thierry Gadou, Frédéric Fauthoux, Bruno Hamm, Frederic Guinot, Christian Garnier, Rony Coco, Ludovic Lannoy

Semifinalist: Caceres CB (Spain) Rod Sellers, Raymond Brown, Jose Antonio Paraiso, Jordi Soler, Miguel Angel Reyes, Enrique Fernández, David Brabender, Inaki Rodriguez, Juan Jose Bernabe, Angel Almeida, Jorge Sanjuan, Nebojša Ilić, Antonio Pedrera

== 1995–96 ==
EUROPEAN LEAGUE

Winner: Panathinaikos Athens (Greece) Dominique Wilkins, Stojko Vranković, Nikos Oikonomou, Panagiotis Giannakis, Fragiskos Alvertis, Miroslav Pecarski, John Korfas, Kostas Patavoukas, Tzanis Stavrakopoulos, Vangelis Vourtzoumis, Christos Myriounis (Coach: Božidar Maljković)

Runner-up: FC Barcelona (Spain) Artūras Karnišovas, Dan Godfread, Andrés Jiménez, Ferran Martínez, Xavi Fernández, Jose Antonio Montero, Manel Bosch, Jose Luis Galilea, Salva Díez, Quique Andreu, Roberto Dueñas, Oriol Junyent (Coach: Aíto García Reneses)

Third: CSKA Moscow (Russia) Vasily Karasev, Julius Nwosu, Igor Kudelin, Evgeni Kisurin, Gundars Vētra, Sergei Panov, Nikita Morgunov, Alexei Vadeev, Igor Kurashov, Andrei Kornev, Andrei Spiridonov (Coach: Stanislav Eremin)

Fourth: Real Madrid (Spain) Joe Arlauckas, Zoran Savić, Mike Smith, José Miguel Antúnez, Pablo Laso, Ismael Santos, Santi Abad, Juan Antonio Morales, Juan Ignacio Romero, Javier Garcia Coll, Martin Ferrer (Coach: Željko Obradović)

Quarterfinalist: Olympiacos Piraeus (Greece) David Rivers, Walter Berry, Dragan Tarlać, Panagiotis Fasoulas, Milan Tomić, Franko Nakić, Georgios Sigalas, Efthimis Bakatsias, Dimitris Papanikolaou, Georgios Papadakos, Nasos Galakteros, Vasilis Soulis

Quarterfinalist: Benetton Treviso (Italy) Henry Williams, Željko Rebrača, Riccardo Pittis, Davide Bonora, Davide Pessina, Andrea Gracis, Roberto Chiacig, Fabrizio Ambrassa, Alberto Vianini, Lauro Bon, Alberto Causin, Jeffrey Colladon

Quarterfinalist: Ülker Istanbul (Turkey) Charles Shackleford, Pete Williams, Harun Erdenay, Orhun Ene, Haluk Yıldırım, Serdar Apaydın, Tolga Tekinalp, Mehmet Ali Tinay, Yusuf Erboy, Aziz Alemdar, Nejat Erguven

Quarterfinalist: Élan Béarnais Pau-Orthez (France) Antoine Rigaudeau, Darren Daye, Reggie Smith, Didier Gadou, Thierry Gadou, Frédéric Fauthoux, Fabien Dubos, Freddy Hufnagel, David Bialski, Rony Coco, Gheorghe Mureșan, Bilongo Batola, Julien Lacaze

EUROPEAN CUP

Winner: Taugres Vitoria (Spain) Velimir Perasović, Kenny Green, Ramón Rivas, Marcelo Nicola, Jordi Millera, Miguel Angel Reyes, Ferran Lopez, Jorge Garbajosa, Juan Pedro Cazorla, Carlos Cazorla, Carlos Dicenta, Pedro Rodríguez, Juan Ignacio Gomez (Coach: Manel Comas)

Runner-up: PAOK Thessaloniki (Greece) Predrag Stojaković, Dean Garrett, Branislav Prelević, Efthimis Rentzias, Nikos Boudouris, George Ballogiannis, Trevor Ruffin, Sotirios Nikolaidis, Ioannis Giannoulis, Christos Tsekos, Kostas Christou, Dimitris Koptis, Achilleas Mamatziolas (Coach: Željko Lukajić)

Semifinalist: Žalgiris Kaunas (Lithuania) Rimas Kurtinaitis, Torgeir Bryn, Darius Lukminas, Kęstutis Šeštokas, Arūnas Visockas, Darius Sirtautas, Darius Maskoliūnas, Tauras Stumbrys, Tomas Masiulis, Erikas Bublys, Eurelijus Žukauskas, Miloš Babić, Joe Hooks, Nerijus Karlikanovas

Semifinalist: Dynamo Moscow (Russia) Sergei Bazarevich, Valeri Daineko, Vitali Nosov, Igor Grachev, Dimitri Chakouline, Ruslan Baidakou, Maxim Astanine, Pavel Astakhov, Dimitri Soukharev, Konstantin Kuznetsov, Alexandre Skrobot, Andrei Olbrekht

KORAĆ CUP

Winner: Efes Pilsen Istanbul (Turkey) Petar Naumoski, Conrad McRae, Ufuk Sarıca, Mirsad Türkcan, Volkan Aydın, Tamer Oyguç, Murat Evliyaoğlu, Hüseyin Beşok, Bora Sancar, Mustafa Kemal Bitim, Alpay Öztas, Erdal Bibo (Coach: Aydın Örs)

Runner-up: Olimpia Stefanel Milano (Italy) Dejan Bodiroga, Gregor Fučka, Rolando Blackman, Ferdinando Gentile, Alessandro De Pol, Flavio Portaluppi, Davide Cantarello, Paolo Alberti, Marco Sambugaro, Marco Baldi (Coach: Bogdan Tanjević)

Semifinalist: Fortitudo Teamsystem Bologna (Italy) Aleksandar Đorđević, Carlton Myers, Dan Gay, Alessandro Frosini, Marcelo Damiao, Massimo Ruggeri, Claudio Pilutti, Andrea Blasi, Andrea Grossi, Alberto Barbieri, Franco Ferroni, Mauro Bonaiuti

Semifinalist: ASVEL Villeurbanne (France) Delaney Rudd, Brian Howard, Ronnie Smith, Alain Digbeu, Remi Rippert, Laurent Pluvy, Jimmy Nebot, Christophe Lion, Jim Galla, Christophe Evano

== 1996–97 ==
EUROLEAGUE

Winner: Olympiacos Piraeus (Greece) David Rivers, Dragan Tarlać, Panagiotis Fasoulas, Milan Tomić, Franko Nakić, Christian Welp, Willie Anderson, Georgios Sigalas, Nasos Galakteros, Efthimis Bakatsias, Dimitris Papanikolaou, Evric Gray, Anatoli Zourpenko, Alexei Savrasenko (Coach: Dušan Ivković)

Runner-up: FC Barcelona (Spain) Artūras Karnišovas, Aleksandar Đorđević, Ramón Rivas, Andrés Jiménez, Xavi Fernández, Andrei Fetisov, Rafael Jofresa, Roger Esteller, Roberto Dueñas, Quique Andreu, Manel Bosch, Salva Díez, Jose Antonio Montero, Victor Alemany (Coach: Aíto García Reneses)

Third: Smelt Olimpija Ljubljana (Slovenia) Ariel McDonald, Marko Milič, Dušan Hauptman, Darren Henrie, Marko Tušek, Vladimer Stepania, Marijan Kraljević, Radoslav Nesterović, Roman Horvat, Ivica Jurković, Jaka Daneu, Slavko Duščak, Gregor Hafnar (Coach: Zmago Sagadin)

Fourth: ASVEL Villeurbanne (France) Delaney Rudd, Brian Howard, Alain Digbeu, Jim Bilba, Georges Adams, Laurent Pluvy, Remi Rippert, Jimmy Nebot, Ronnie Smith, Olivier Bourgain, Thomas Andrieux, Karim Ouattara (Coach: Greg Beugnot)

Quarterfinalist: Panathinaikos Athens (Greece) Byron Dinkins, Julius Nwosu, Nikos Oikonomou, Ferran Martínez, Hugo Sconochini, Fragiskos Alvertis, Marcelo Nicola, Michael Koch, John Amaechi, John Korfas, Ioannis Georgikopoulos, John Salley, Vangelis Vourtzoumis, Saša Marković

Quarterfinalist: Efes Pilsen Istanbul (Turkey) Petar Naumoski, Vasily Karasev, Derrick Alston, Mirsad Türkcan, Ufuk Sarıca, Tamer Oyguç, Murat Evliyaoğlu, Volkan Aydın, Hüseyin Beşok, Mark Pope, Hidayet Türkoğlu, Alpay Oztas

Quarterfinalist: Olimpia Stefanel Milano (Italy) Anthony Bowie, Gregor Fučka, Warren Kidd, Ferdinando Gentile, Alessandro De Pol, Flavio Portaluppi, Davide Cantarello, Marco Sambugaro, Marco Spangaro, Andrea Michelori

Quarterfinalist: Fortitudo Teamsystem Bologna (Italy) Carlton Myers, Conrad McRae, Eric Murdock, Dan Gay, Alessandro Frosini, Massimo Ruggeri, Claudio Pilutti, Francesco Vescovi, Andrea Blasi, John Crotty, Roberto Casoli, Mauro Bonaiuti, Nicola Barbieri

EUROCUP

Winner: Real Madrid (Spain) Dejan Bodiroga, Joe Arlauckas, Alberto Herreros, Alberto Angulo, Juan Antonio Orenga, Juan Antonio Morales, Mike Smith, José Miguel Antúnez, Roberto Núñez, Ismael Santos, Pablo Laso, Lorenzo Sanz (Coach: Željko Obradović)

Runner-up: Scaligera Mash Verona (Italy) Mike Iuzzolino, Randolph Keys, Roberto Bullara, Alessandro Boni, Roberto Dalla Vecchia, David Londero, Giacomo Galanda, Joachim Jerichow, Fabio Capello, Matteo Nobile, Andrea Gianolla, Gianluca Tiso, Mario Soave, Claus Hansen (Coach: Andrea Mazzon)

Semifinalist: Iraklis Thessaloniki (Greece) Jure Zdovc, Steve Bucknall, Erik Meek, Mattias Sahlstrom, Lefteris Kakiousis, John Brougos, Milan Jeremić, Juan Manuel Moltedo, Georgios Giannouzakos, Angelos Siristatidis, Dimitris Iliopoulos, Lazaros Papadopoulos, Spyridon Kekelis, Isidoros Koutsos

Semifinalist: PSG Racing Paris (France) J. R. Reid, Stéphane Risacher, Richard Dacoury, Éric Struelens, Arsene Ade Mensah, Laurent Sciarra, Franck Meriguet, David Bialski, Jean-Marc Setier, Stephane Bouchardon, Kevin Camara, Sedale Threatt, Žarko Paspalj, Sébastien Jasaron

KORAĆ CUP

Winner: Aris Thessaloniki (Greece) José "Piculín" Ortiz, Charles Shackleford, Panagiotis Liadelis, Mario Boni, Dinos Angelidis, Tzanis Stavrakopoulos, Mike Nahar, Alan Tomidy, Ioannis Sioutis, Georgios Floros, Alexis Papadatos, Aris Holopoulos (Coach: Slobodan-Lefteris Subotić)

Runner-up: TOFAS Bursa (Turkey) Rashard Griffith, Steven Rogers, Vladan Alanović, Samir Avdić, Murat Konuk, Levent Topsakal, Semsettin Bas, Cüneyt Erden, Tolga Ongoren, Serdar Caglan, Tayfun Kuyan (Coach: Atilla Çakmak)

Semifinalist: Benetton Treviso (Italy) Henry Williams, Željko Rebrača, Riccardo Pittis, Denis Marconato, Andrea Niccolai, Glenn Sekunda, Davide Bonora, Andrea Gracis, Jeffrey Colladon, Stefano Rusconi, Marco Carraretto

Semifinalist: Mazowszanka Pruszków (Poland) Jeff Massey, Tyrice Walker, Piotr Szybilski, Dariusz Parzenski, Krzysztof Dryja, Krzysztof Sidor, Jacek Rybczynski, Leszek Karwowski, Tomasz Suski, Dominik Czubek, Hubert Bialczewski, Tomasz Ziembinski

== 1997–98 ==
EUROLEAGUE

Winner: Virtus Kinder Bologna (Italy) Predrag Danilović, Zoran Savić, Antoine Rigaudeau, Alessandro Abbio, Hugo Sconochini, Radoslav Nesterović, Alessandro Frosini, Augusto Binelli, John Amaechi, Riccardo Morandotti, Claudio Crippa, Fabio Ruini, Enrico Ravaglia, Tomas Ress, Davide Gonzo (Coach: Ettore Messina)

Runner-up: AEK Athens (Greece) Victor Alexander, Branislav Prelević, Willie Anderson, Nikos Chatzis, Michael Andersen, José Lasa, Claudio Coldebella, Michalis Kakiouzis, Mikkel Larsen, Iakovos Tsakalidis, Ramón Rivas, Ricky Pierce, Terence Stansbury, Prodromos Nikolaidis, Christos Lingos, Panagiotis Barlas, Dimitris Papadopoulos (Coach: Ioannis Ioannidis)

Third: Benetton Treviso (Italy) Henry Williams, Željko Rebrača, Denis Marconato, Riccardo Pittis, Andrea Niccolai, Stefano Rusconi, Glenn Sekunda, Davide Bonora, Laurent Sciarra, Andrea Gracis, Stjepan Stazić, Mauro Rosso (Coach: Željko Obradović)

Fourth: Partizan Belgrade (Yugoslavia) Dejan Tomašević, Predrag Drobnjak, Haris Brkić, Dragan Lukovski, Miroslav Radošević, Aleksandar Čubrilo, Vladimir Đokić, Slaviša Koprivica, Ratko Varda, Mišel Lazarević, Milan Dozet, Vladimir Vidačić (Coach: Milovan Bogojević)

Quarterfinalist: Fortitudo Teamsystem Bologna (Italy) Dominique Wilkins, David Rivers, Gregor Fučka, Carlton Myers, Roberto Chiacig, Dan O'Sullivan, Giacomo Galanda, Paolo Moretti, Dan Gay, Stefano Attruia, Stefano Vidili

Quarterfinalist: Efes Pilsen Istanbul (Turkey) Petar Naumoski, Brian Howard, Rod Sellers, Mirsad Türkcan, Ufuk Sarıca, Hüseyin Beşok, Murat Evliyaoğlu, Tamer Oyguç, Volkan Aydın, Hidayet Türkoğlu

Quarterfinalist: CSKA Moscow (Russia) Marcus Webb, Valeri Daineko, Gundars Vētra, Valery Tikhonenko, Sergei Panov, Igor Kudelin, Dimitri Chakouline, Dmitri Domani, Anton Yudin, Alexandre Goutorov, Igor Kurashov, Mikhail Soloviev, Nikita Morgunov, Alexander Bashminov, Michael Jennings

Quarterfinalist: Alba Berlin (Germany) Wendell Alexis, Vasily Karasev, Henning Harnisch, Christian Welp, Geert Hammink, Henrik Rödl, Vladimir Bogojević, Marko Pešić, Stephen Arigbabu, Jörg Lütcke

EUROCUP

Winner: Žalgiris Kaunas (Lithuania) Saulius Štombergas, Ennis Whatley, Dainius Adomaitis, Franjo Arapović, Tomas Masiulis, Virginijus Praškevičius, Darius Maskoliūnas, Kęstutis Šeštokas, Mindaugas Žukauskas, Darius Sirtautas, Eurelijus Žukauskas, Tauras Stumbrys, Danya Abrams (Coach: Jonas Kazlauskas)

Runner-up: Olimpia Stefanel Milano (Italy) Thurl Bailey, Warren Kidd, Srđan Jovanović, Ferdinando Gentile, Georgios Sigalas, Flavio Portaluppi, Mattias Sahlstrom, Massimo Ruggeri, Marco Sambugaro, Davide Cantarello, Andrea Michelori, Marco Mordente (Coach: Franco Marcelletti)

Semifinalist: Panathinaikos Athens (Greece) Byron Scott, Dino Rađa, Nikos Oikonomou, Fragiskos Alvertis, Michael Koch, Fanis Christodoulou, Sascha Hupmann, Ferran Martínez, Georgios Kalaitzis, Kostas Patavoukas, Johnny Branch, Antonis Fotsis, Vangelis Vourtzoumis

Semifinalist: Avtodor Saratov (Russia) Gintaras Einikis, Darius Lukminas, Zakhar Pashutin, Andrei Maltsev, Evgeniy Pashutin, Andrei Sepelev, Yuri Zhukanenko, Sergei Demeshkin, Sergei Smirnov, Oleg Malaev, Evgeni Mironov, Valeri Konotopov, Evgeni Smirnov, Alexander Nazarov

KORAĆ CUP

Winner: Scaligera Mash Verona (Italy) Mike Iuzzolino, Randolph Keys, Hansi Gnad, Myron Brown, Roberto Dalla Vecchia, Roberto Bullara, Joachim Jerichow, Alessandro Boni, Matteo Nobile, Giampiero Savio, Damiano Dalfini, Davide Tisato, Matteo Sacchetti, Mario Soave, Massimo Spezie (Coach: Andrea Mazzon)

Runner-up: Crvena Zvezda Belgrade (Yugoslavia) Milenko Topić, Igor Rakočević, Jovo Stanojević, Zlatko Bolić, Oliver Popović, Vladimir Kuzmanović, Željko Topalović, Vojkan Benčić, Dejan Mišković, Igor Perović, Danijel Milić (Coach: Vladislav Lučić)

Semifinalist: Virtus Calze Pompea Roma (Italy) Saša Obradović, Bill Edwards, Walter Magnifico, Davide Pessina, Fabrizio Ambrassa, Flavio Carera, Paolo Calbini, Alessandro Tonolli, Emiliano Busca, Saverio Coltellacci, Tommaso Plateo, Ruggero Fiasco, Davide Turiello, Massimiliano Pedone

Semifinalist: Cholet Basket (France) Micheal Ray Richardson, James Blackwell, Paul Fortier, Herman Henry, Cedric Miller, Giancarlo Marcaccini, Jean-Philippe Methelie, Aymeric Jeanneau, Stéphane Ostrowski, Jean-Marc Setier, Regis Boissie

== 1998–99 ==
EUROLEAGUE

Winner: Žalgiris Kaunas (Lithuania) Tyus Edney, Anthony Bowie, Saulius Štombergas, Jiří Zídek, Dainius Adomaitis, Mindaugas Žukauskas, Eurelijus Žukauskas, Tomas Masiulis, Darius Maskoliūnas, Kęstutis Šeštokas (Coach: Jonas Kazlauskas)

Runner-up: Virtus Kinder Bologna (Italy) Predrag Danilović, Antoine Rigaudeau, Radoslav Nesterović, Alessandro Abbio, Hugo Sconochini, Alessandro Frosini, Dan O'Sullivan, Augusto Binelli, Žarko Paspalj, Claudio Crippa, Michael Olowokandi, Matteo Panichi, Fabio Ruini (Coach: Ettore Messina)

Third: Olympiacos Piraeus (Greece) Arijan Komazec, Anthony Goldwire, Dragan Tarlać, Johnny Rogers, Milan Tomić, Fabricio Oberto, Dimitris Papanikolaou, Dusan Vukčević, Arsene Ade Mensah, Panagiotis Fasoulas, Vasilis Soulis (Coach: Dušan Ivković)

Fourth: Fortitudo Teamsystem Bologna (Italy) Artūras Karnišovas, Carlton Myers, Gregor Fučka, Damir Mulaomerović, Marko Jarić, Roberto Chiacig, Dan Gay, Marcelo Damiao, Andrew Betts, Claudio Pilutti, Vinny Del Negro, Paolo Moretti, Alessandro Cittadini (Coach: Petar Skansi)

Quarterfinalist: Efes Pilsen Istanbul (Turkey) Petar Naumoski, Zoran Savić, Predrag Drobnjak, Mirsad Türkcan, Hüseyin Beşok, Ufuk Sarıca, Murat Evliyaoğlu, Volkan Aydın, Hidayet Türkoğlu, Nedim Dal, Ömer Onan

Quarterfinalist: Real Madrid (Spain) Tanoka Beard, Alberto Herreros, Éric Struelens, Alberto Angulo, José Lasa, Bobby Martin, Ismael Santos, Sergio Luyk, Iker Iturbe, Antonio Bueno, Hector García

Quarterfinalist: ASVEL Villeurbanne (France) Delaney Rudd, Darren Henrie, Alain Digbeu, Jim Bilba, Moustapha Sonko, Crawford Palmer, Laurent Pluvy, Georges Adams, Joakim Blom, Jean-Gael Percevaut, Salomon Sami

Quarterfinalist: Élan Béarnais Pau-Orthez (France) Josh Grant, Laurent Foirest, Ronnie Smith, Juan Aisa, Thierry Gadou, Didier Gadou, Emanual Davis, Frédéric Fauthoux, Dwayne Scholten, Ryan Lorthridge, Narcisse Ewodo, Frederic Moncade

SAPORTA CUP

Winner: Benetton Treviso (Italy) Henry Williams, Željko Rebrača, Marcelo Nicola, Glenn Sekunda, William Di Spalatro, Tomás Jofresa, Denis Marconato, Casey Schmidt, Davide Bonora, Riccardo Pittis, Oliver Narr, Stjepan Stazić, Matteo Maestrello (Coach: Željko Obradović)

Runner-up: Pamesa Valencia (Spain) Bernard Hopkins, Rod Sellers, Berni Álvarez, Victor Luengo, Jose Luis Maluenda, Alfonso Albert, Nacho Rodilla, Cesar Alonso, Ruben Burgos, Ignacio Martorell (Coach: Miki Vuković)

Semifinalist: Aris Thessaloniki (Greece) Mikhail Mikhailov, Gary Grant, Panagiotis Liadelis, Georgios Sigalas, Dinos Angelidis, Nasos Galakteros, Ioannis Sioutis, Alexander Kühl, Georgios Chrysanthopoulos, Mark Nees, Dimitrios Makris, Georgios Floros, Michael Pournaris

Semifinalist: Budućnost Podgorica (Yugoslavia) Vlado Šćepanović, Nikola Bulatović, Dragan Vukčević, Željko Topalović, Gavrilo Pajović, Dejan Radonjić, Goran Bošković, Dragan Ćeranić, Saša Radunović, Đuro Ostojić, Balša Radunović

KORAĆ CUP

Winner: FC Barcelona (Spain) Aleksandar Đorđević, Derrick Alston, Milan Gurović, Efthimis Rentzias, Roger Esteller, Rodrigo de la Fuente, Xavi Fernandez, Roberto Dueñas, Ignacio Rodríguez, Alfons Alzamora, Oriol Junyent, Juan Carlos Navarro, Chema Marcos (Coach: Aíto García Reneses)

Runner-up: Estudiantes Madrid (Spain) Alfonso Reyes, Shaun Vandiver, Chandler Thompson, Iñaki de Miguel, Gonzalo Martínez, Carlos Jiménez, Pedro Robles, Ignacio Azofra, Enrique Barcenas, Javier Velazquez, Felipe Reyes, Carlos Brana (Coach: Pepu Hernández)

Semifinalist: Panionios Athens (Greece) Alvin Sims, Duane Cooper, Dušan Jelić, Vassilis Kikilias, Georgios Karagoutis, Roberto Casoli, Tzanis Stavrakopoulos, Nikos Michalos, Prodromos Dreliozis, Georgios Limniatis, Thanasis Kamariotis, Amal McCaskill, Spyridon Rigos

Semifinalist: Sunair Oostende (Belgium) Quadre Lollis, Jean-Marc Jaumin, Ronny Bayer, John Jerome, Tomas Van Den Spiegel, Barry Mitchell, Matthias Desaever, Daniel Goethals, Dimitri Lauwers, Piet De Bel

== 1999–2000 ==
EUROLEAGUE

Winner: Panathinaikos Athens (Greece) Dejan Bodiroga, Željko Rebrača, Oded Kattash, Johnny Rogers, Antonis Fotsis, Fragiskos Alvertis, Pat Burke, Michael Koch, Ferdinando Gentile, Nikos Boudouris, Georgios Kalaitzis, Kostas Maglos, Georgios Karagoutis (Coach: Željko Obradović)

Runner-up: Maccabi Tel Aviv (Israel) Nate Huffman, Ariel McDonald, Doron Sheffer, Dallas Comegys, Nadav Henefeld, Gur Shelef, Mark Brisker, Derrick Sharp, Doron Jamchi, Constantin Popa (Coach: Pini Gershon)

Third: Efes Pilsen Istanbul (Turkey) İbrahim Kutluay, Damir Mulaomerović, Hidayet Türkoğlu, Predrag Drobnjak, Hüseyin Beşok, Ömer Onan, Rickie Winslow, Marc Jackson, Arda Vekiloğlu, Nedim Dal, Kareem Reid, Bora Sancar (Coach: Aydın Ors / Ergin Ataman)

Fourth: FC Barcelona (Spain) Anthony Goldwire, Derrick Alston, Milan Gurović, Juan Carlos Navarro, Efthimis Rentzias, Roberto Dueñas, Alain Digbeu, Rodrigo de la Fuente, Ignacio Rodríguez, Pau Gasol, Francisco Elson, Alfons Alzamora (Coach: Aíto García Reneses)

Quarterfinalist: Fortitudo PAF Bologna (Italy) Artūras Karnišovas, Carlton Myers, Gregor Fučka, Stojko Vranković, Marko Jarić, Gianluca Basile, Giacomo Galanda, Dan Gay, Claudio Pilutti, Matteo Anchisi, Massimo Ruggeri

Quarterfinalist: Union Olimpija Ljubljana (Slovenia) Šarūnas Jasikevičius, Marko Milič, Jure Zdovc, Emilio Kovačić, Slavko Kotnik, Sani Bečirovič, Jurica Golemac, Primož Brezec, Slavko Duščak, Gordan Zadravec, Miloš Paravinja, Stipe Modrić, Damir Milačić, Walter Berry

Quarterfinalist: ASVEL Villeurbanne (France) Marlon Maxey, Moustapha Sonko, Jay Larranaga, Jim Bilba, Shea Seals, Laurent Pluvy, Joakim Blom, Jean-Gael Percevaut, Stephane Lauvergne, Salomon Sami

Quarterfinalist: Cibona Zagreb (Croatia) Gordan Giriček, Nikola Prkačin, Josip Sesar, Vladimir Krstić, Josip Vranković, Stipe Šarlija, Davor Marcelić, Dževad Alihodžić, Sandro Nicević, Ivica Žurić, Mark Baker, Michael Anderson

SAPORTA CUP

Winner: AEK Athens (Greece) Anthony Bowie, Martin Müürsepp, Michalis Kakiouzis, Angelos Koronios, Nikos Chatzis, Dimos Dikoudis, Iakovos Tsakalidis, Dan O'Sullivan, Steve Hansell, Vassilis Kikilias, Nikos Papanikolopoulos, Miltos Moschou (Coach: Dušan Ivković)

Runner-up: Virtus Kinder Bologna (Italy) Predrag Danilović, Antoine Rigaudeau, Saulius Štombergas, Nikos Ekonomou, Alessandro Abbio, Hugo Sconochini, Alessandro Frosini, Davide Bonora, Augusto Binelli, David Andersen, Michael Andersen, Luca Ansaloni, Fabio Ruini, Paolo Barlera (Coach: Ettore Messina)

Semifinalist: Lietuvos Rytas Vilnius (Lithuania) Eric Elliot, Arvydas Macijauskas, Ramūnas Šiškauskas, Andrius Giedraitis, Oleksandr Okunsky, Andrius Šležas, Arnas Kazlauskas, Giedrius Aidietis, Robertas Javtokas, Andrius Vysniauskas, Gintaras Kadžiulis, Mantas Cesnauskis, Valerij Cetovic (Coach: Alfredas Vainauskas / Šarūnas Sakalauskas)

Semifinalist: KK Zadar (Croatia) Dino Rađa, Arijan Komazec, Tomislav Ružić, Darko Krunić, Jurica Ružić, Hrvoje Perinčić, Kristijan Ercegović, Scott Stewart, Jurica Žuža, Ivica Škalabrin, Goran Kalamiza, Tomislav Knežević, Mario Maloča, Martin Vanjak, Marko Popović, Dario Delibašić

KORAĆ CUP

Winner: CSP Limoges (France) Marcus Brown, Yann Bonato, Harper Williams, Frédéric Weis, Bruno Hamm, Thierry Rupert, Stéphane Dumas, David Frigout, Stjepan Stazić, Jean-Philippe Methelie, Carl Thomas, Frédéric Adjiwanou (Coach: Duško Ivanović)

Runner-up: Unicaja Málaga (Spain) Veljko Mršić, Jean-Jacques Conceição, Jean-Marc Jaumin, Bryan Sallier, Xavi Fernandez, Juan Antonio Orenga, Richard Petruška, Giancarlo Marcaccini, Jesus Lazaro, Germán Gabriel, Berni Rodríguez, Daniel Romero, Carlos Cabezas (Coach: Božidar Maljković)

Semifinalist: Estudiantes Madrid (Spain) Chandler Thompson, Shaun Vandiver, Alfonso Reyes, Carlos Jiménez, Juan Aisa, Felipe Reyes, Ignacio Azofra, Asier García, Gonzalo Martínez, Pedro Robles, Cesar Arranz, Andy Toolson

Semifinalist: Casademont Girona (Spain) Darryl Middleton, Larry Stewart, Martti Kuisma, Pablo Laso, Enrique Moraga, Xavier Sanchez, Eric Johnson, Gerard Darnes, Toni Espinosa, Xavier Vallmajo, Alberto Alzamora

== 2000–01 ==
FIBA SUPROLEAGUE

Winner: Maccabi Tel Aviv (Israel) Nate Huffman, Anthony Parker, Ariel McDonald, Nadav Henefeld, Derrick Sharp, Radisav Ćurčić, Gur Shelef, Tal Burstein, Mark Brisker, Velibor Radović, David Sternlight, Elad Savion (Coach: Pini Gershon)

Runner-up: Panathinaikos Athens (Greece) Dejan Bodiroga, Željko Rebrača, Johnny Rogers, Darryl Middleton, Antonis Fotsis, Fragiskos Alvertis, Pat Burke, Michael Koch, Ferdinando Gentile, Georgios Kalaitzis, George Ballogiannis, Ioannis Rodostoglou, Andreas Glyniadakis, Ioannis Voulgaris (Coach: Željko Obradović)

Third: Efes Pilsen Istanbul (Turkey) Damir Mulaomerović, Predrag Drobnjak, Vlado Šćepanović, Hüseyin Beşok, Mehmet Okur, Ömer Onan, Kerem Tunçeri, Kaya Peker, Alper Yılmaz, Erdal Bibo, Ender Arslan, Mirsad Türkcan, Arda Vekiloğlu (Coach: Ergin Ataman / Oktay Mahmuti)

Fourth: CSKA Moscow (Russia) Andrei Kirilenko, Andrei Fetisov, Gintaras Einikis, Nikita Morgunov, Igor Kudelin, Vladan Alanović, Alexander Petrenko, Dmitri Domani, Rusty La Rue, Nikolai Padius, Yadgar Karimov, Sergei Panov, Mikalai Aliakseyeu (Coach: Valery Tikhonenko)

Quarterfinalist: Scavolini Pesaro (Italy) DeMarco Johnson, Larry Middleton, Melvin Booker, Marko Tušek, Brad Traina, Silvio Gigena, Michele Maggioli, Andrea Pecile, Fabio Zanelli, Walter Magnifico, Matteo Panichi, Daniele Cinciarini

Quarterfinalist: Alba Berlin (Germany) Wendell Alexis, Dejan Koturović, Henrik Rödl, Derrick Phelps, Marko Pešić, Teoman Öztürk, Jörg Lütcke, Sven Schultze, Stipo Papić, Stefano Garris, Dražen Tomić, Tommy Torwarth, Jan-Hendrik Jagla

Quarterfinalist: ASVEL Villeurbanne (France) Bill Edwards, Art Long, Laurent Sciarra, Zakhar Pashutin, Jim Bilba, Laurent Pluvy, David Frigout, Joakim Blom, Peter Hoffman, Joe Stephens, Amara Sy, Frederic Miguel

Quarterfinalist: Croatia Insurance Split (Croatia) Nikola Vujčić, Ross Land, Terrence Rencher, Andrija Žižić, Ante Grgurević, Joško Poljak, Alan Gregov, Živko Badžim, Srdan Subotić, Ivan Tomeljak, Roko Ukić, Drago Pašalić

EUROLEAGUE BASKETBALL

Winner: Virtus Kinder Bologna (Italy) Manu Ginóbili, Antoine Rigaudeau, Rashard Griffith, Marko Jarić, Matjaž Smodiš, Alessandro Frosini, Alessandro Abbio, David Andersen, Davide Bonora, Nikola Jestratijević, Fabrizio Ambrassa, Hugo Sconochini, David Brkić, Gianluca Ghedini, Cristian Akrivos (Coach: Ettore Messina)

Runner-up: TAU Ceramica Vitoria (Spain) Victor Alexander, Elmer Bennett, Saulius Štombergas, Fabricio Oberto, Luis Scola, Laurent Foirest, Mindaugas Timinskas, Chris Corchiani, Sergi Vidal, Dani García (Coach: Duško Ivanović)

Semifinalist: AEK Athens (Greece) İbrahim Kutluay, Vrbica Stefanov, Michalis Kakiouzis, Dimos Dikoudis, Martin Müürsepp, Andrew Betts, Geert Hammink, Nikos Chatzis, Steve Hansell, Vassilis Kikilias, Spyros Panteliadis, Nikos Zisis, Milan Gurović, Miltos Moschou, Dimitris Misiakos (Coach: Dušan Ivković)

Semifinalist: Fortitudo PAF Bologna (Italy) Gregor Fučka, Stojko Vranković, Carlton Myers, Anthony Bowie, Gianluca Basile, Giacomo Galanda, Andrea Meneghin, Eurelijus Žukauskas, Adrian Autry, Alessandro De Pol, Claudio Pilutti, Massimo Ruggeri, Marcelo Damiao (Coach: Carlo Recalcati)

Quarterfinalist: Benetton Treviso (Italy) Petar Naumoski, Marcus Brown, Jorge Garbajosa, Marcelo Nicola, Riccardo Pittis, Denis Marconato, Boštjan Nachbar, Ismael Santos, Massimo Bulleri, Alan Tomidy, Luca Sottana, Peter Lisicky

Quarterfinalist: Olympiacos Piraeus (Greece) David Rivers, Dino Rađa, Nikos Oikonomou, Milan Tomić, Patrick Femerling, Dimitris Papanikolaou, Stéphane Risacher, Dušan Vukčević, Iñaki de Miguel, Nikos Boudouris, Vasilis Soulis

Quarterfinalist: Union Olimpija Ljubljana (Slovenia) Sani Bečirovič, Walsh Jordan, Mindaugas Žukauskas, Emilio Kovačić, Jurica Golemac, Beno Udrih, Primož Brezec, Slavko Kotnik, Jiří Welsch, Petar Arsić, David Evans, Stipe Modrić

Quarterfinalist: Real Madrid (Spain) Aleksandar Đorđević, Marko Milič, Alberto Herreros, Jiří Zídek, Éric Struelens, Erik Meek, Raúl López, Alberto Angulo, Lucio Angulo, Iker Iturbe, Roberto Núñez, Ariel Eslava

SAPORTA CUP

Winner: Maroussi Athens (Greece) Ashraf Amaya, Jimmy Oliver, Vasco Evtimov, Georgios Maslarinos, Alexis Falekas, Sotirios Nikolaidis, Vangelis Vourtzoumis, Dimitris Marmarinos, Dimitris Karaplis, Vangelis Logothetis, Sotirios Manolopoulos, Charalampos Charalampidis, Kostas Anagnostou (Coach: Vangelis Alexandris)

Runner-up: Élan Chalon (France) Andre Owens, Stanley Jackson, Róbert Gulyás, Rashard Lee, Craig Robinson, Stéphane Ostrowski, Sacha Giffa, Dražen Tomić, Mickael Hay, José Vespasien, Vincent Margueritte, Thomas Dubiez, Steed Tchicamboud (Coach: Philippe Herve)

Semifinalist: Pamesa Valencia (Spain) Derrick Alston, Bernard Hopkins, Jose Ignacio Rodilla, Berni Álvarez, Jordi Millera, Jose Luis Maluenda, Victor Luengo, Ruben Burgos, Alfonso Albert, Pat Durham, Hugues Occansey, Cesar Alonso

Semifinalist: UNICS Kazan (Russia) Michael Meeks, Glen Whisby, Leonid Iailo, Evgeniy Pashutin, Anton Yudin, Petr Samoilenko, Igor Grachev, Andrei Kornev, Valentin Kubrakov, Ruslan Avleev, Sergei Vorotnikov

KORAĆ CUP

Winner: Unicaja Málaga (Spain) Danya Abrams, Veljko Mršić, Moustapha Sonko, Jean-Marc Jaumin, Paco Vazquez, Richard Petruška, Berni Rodríguez, Darren Phillip, Frédéric Weis, Carlos Cabezas, Kenny Miller, Germán Gabriel, Francis Perujo (Coach: Božidar Maljković)

Runner-up: Hemofarm Vršac (Yugoslavia) Stevan Peković, Aleksandar Zečević, Dragoljub Vidačić, Đorđe Đogo, Marko Ivanović, Saša Savić, Ivan Stefanović, Luka Vučinić, Andrija Ćirić, Zoran Popović, Marko Brkić, Igor Miličević, Dragan Jankovski, Jovan Perin (Coach: Željko Lukajić)

Semifinalist: Ricoh Astronauts Amsterdam (Netherlands) Joe Spinks, Chris McGuthrie, Sydmil Harris, Egi Mikalajunas, Koen Rouwhorst, Mario Bennes, Edward Lieverst, Lucien Boldewijn, Urbian Vreds, Raoul Heinen, Sander Van der Holst, Roberto Van Den Broek, Pascal Van Alten

Semifinalist: FLV Athlon Ieper (Belgium) Roger Huggins, Michael Huger, Yves Dupont, Hendrik Van der Sluis, Herbert Baert, Helgi Gudfinnsson, Jurgen Malbeck, Larry Davis, Pieter Van Hoecke, Niels Bjerregaard, Vincent Vermeiren, Jef Van Der Jonckheyd, Louis Rowe

== 2001–02 ==
EUROLEAGUE

Winner: Panathinaikos Athens (Greece) Dejan Bodiroga, İbrahim Kutluay, Damir Mulaomerović, Darryl Middleton, Fragiskos Alvertis, Lazaros Papadopoulos, Pepe Sánchez, Johnny Rogers, Corey Albano, İoannis Giannoulis, Georgios Kalaitzis, Ioannis Sioutis, George Ballogiannis (Coach: Željko Obradović)

Runner-up: Virtus Kinder Bologna (Italy) Manu Ginóbili, Antoine Rigaudeau, Marko Jarić, Rashard Griffith, Matjaž Smodiš, David Andersen, Alessandro Frosini, Alessandro Abbio, Sani Bečirovič, Davide Bonora, David Brkić, Paolo Barlera, Antonio Granger, Carlo Ferri, Cristian Akrivos, Roberto Graziano (Coach: Ettore Messina)

Semifinalist: Maccabi Tel Aviv (Israel) Nate Huffman, Anthony Parker, Ariel McDonald, Nadav Henefeld, Hüseyin Beşok, Tal Burstein, Gur Shelef, Derrick Sharp, Yoav Saffar, Mark Brisker, Radisav Ćurčić, Yotam Halperin, Nikola Vujčić (Coach: David Blatt)

Semifinalist: Benetton Treviso (Italy) Tyus Edney, Denis Marconato, Jorge Garbajosa, Boštjan Nachbar, Sergei Chikalkin, Marcelo Nicola, Riccardo Pittis, Massimo Bulleri, Mario Stojić, Nikoloz Tskitishvili, Charlie Bell, Alan Tomidy, Francesco Basei (Coach: Mike D'Antoni)

2nd in Top 16 Group: FC Barcelona (Spain) Šarūnas Jasikevičius, Artūras Karnišovas, Alain Digbeu, Ademola Okulaja, Roberto Dueñas, Efthimis Rentzias, Juan Carlos Navarro, Ignacio Rodríguez, Rodrigo De la Fuente, Anderson Varejão, Alfons Alzamora, Nikos Ekonomou, Remon van de Hare, Jordi Grimau, Doug Overton

2nd in Top 16 Group: Olympiacos Piraeus (Greece) Alphonso Ford, Theodoros Papaloukas, James Forrest, Stéphane Risacher, Alexei Savrasenko, Milan Tomić, Iñaki de Miguel, Patrick Femerling, Nikos Boudouris, Dimitris Papanikolaou, Eyinmisan Nikagbatse, Dušan Jelić, Panagiotis Mantzanas, Periklis Dorkofikis, Emre Ekim

2nd in Top 16 Group: Efes Pilsen Istanbul (Turkey) Marcus Brown, Kaspars Kambala, Mehmet Okur, Saulius Štombergas, Kaya Peker, Kerem Tunçeri, Ömer Onan, Alper Yılmaz, Arda Vekiloğlu, Ender Arslan, Enver Ekmen

2nd in Top 16 Group: TAU Ceramica Vitoria (Spain) Dejan Tomašević, Fabricio Oberto, Elmer Bennett, Laurent Foirest, Andrés Nocioni, Luis Scola, Hugo Sconochini, Chris Corchiani, Sergi Vidal, Gabriel Fernández, Eduardo Fernández, Christos Charissis, Mindaugas Timinskas, Richard Petruška, Carlos Arroyo, Charles Byrd

SAPORTA CUP

Winner: Montepaschi Siena (Italy) Petar Naumoski, Vrbica Stefanov, Roberto Chiacig, Brian Tolbert, Boris Gorenc, Milenko Topić, Mindaugas Žukauskas, Nikola Bulatović, Alpay Oztas, Marco Rossetti, Germán Scarone, Andrea Pilotti (Coach: Ergin Ataman)

Runner-up: Pamesa Valencia (Spain) Bernard Hopkins, Derrick Alston, Jose Antonio Paraiso, Nacho Rodilla, Victor Luengo, Francisco Elson, Casey Schmidt, Jordi Millera, Brian Clifford, Dante Calabria, Alfonso Albert (Coach: Luis Casimiro)

Semifinalist: Hapoel Jerusalem (Israel) Demetrius Alexander, Meir Tapiro, Siniša Kelečević, Lamont Jones, Moshe Mizrahi, Erez Katz, Shahar Gordon, Barak Peleg, Itzik Ohanon, Ori Ichaki

Semifinalist: Anwil Włocławek (Poland) Ed O'Bannon, Matthew Santangelo, Jeff Nordgaard, Goran Savanović, Alexander Koul, Mlađan Šilobad, Igor Griszczuk, Armands Šķēle, Roman Prawica, Marek Andruška, Vladimir Anzulović, Robert Witka, Hrvoje Henjak

KORAĆ CUP

Winner: SLUC Nancy (France) Stevin Smith, Cyril Julian, Ross Land, Fabien Dubos, Goran Bošković, Joseph Gomis, Vincent Masingue, Maxime Zianveni, Mouhamadou Mbodji, Danilo Smiljanić, Gary Phaeton, Loic Toilier (Coach: Sylvain Lautie)

Runner-up: Lokomotiv Mineralnye Vody (Russia) Eurelijus Žukauskas, James Ray Robinson, Goran Jagodnik, Igor Kudelin, Anthony Todd Farmer, Andrei Vedishchev, Andrei Tsypachev, Vojkan Benčić, Vladislav Konovalov, Evgeni Kurilov, Jaroslav Strelkin, Eric Johnson Jones, Uladzimir Karankevich, Joe Adkins (Coach: Anatoli Sukhachev)

Semifinalist: Maroussi Athens (Greece) Jimmy Oliver, Pat Burke, Michael Koch, Marty Conlon, Angelos Koronios, Georgios Pavlidis, Georgios Maslarinos, Alexis Falekas, Vassilis Spanoulis, Dimitris Marmarinos, Sotirios Manolopoulos, Sotirios Nikolaidis, Ashraf Amaya, Kostas Anagnostou, Stavros Daniil

Semifinalist: Pivovarna Lasko (Slovenia) Tory Walker, Slavko Duščak, Goran Jurak, Smiljan Pavič, Ernest Novak, Samir Lerić, Dragan Miletić, Ivan Vujičić, Primož Brolih, Fuad Memčić, Litterial Green, Fahrudin Đulović, Aljaz Fantinato

== 2002–03 ==
EUROLEAGUE

Winner: FC Barcelona (Spain) Šarūnas Jasikevičius, Dejan Bodiroga, Gregor Fučka, Roberto Dueñas, Juan Carlos Navarro, Patrick Femerling, Rodrigo De la Fuente, Anderson Varejão, Ignacio Rodríguez, Cesar Bravo, Alfons Alzamora, Remon van de Hare (Coach: Svetislav Pešić)

Runner-up: Benetton Treviso (Italy) Tyus Edney, Trajan Langdon, Jorge Garbajosa, Denis Marconato, Riccardo Pittis, Marcelo Nicola, Massimo Bulleri, Krešimir Lončar, Manuchar Markoishvili, Nick Eppeheimer, Thomas Soltau, István Németh, Dante Calabria, Mario Stojić, David Steffel (Coach: Ettore Messina)

Third: Montepaschi Siena (Italy) Alphonso Ford, Mirsad Türkcan, Vrbica Stefanov, Mindaugas Žukauskas, Roberto Chiacig, Michalis Kakiouzis, Dušan Vukčević, Cal Bowdler, Aaron Mitchell, Giancarlo Marcaccini, Marco Mordente, Luca Lechthaler, Simone Berti, Curtis McCants, Ferdinando Gentile, Michele Maggioli (Coach: Ergin Ataman)

Fourth: CSKA Moscow (Russia) Victor Alexander, Jon Robert Holden, Theodoros Papaloukas, Darius Songaila, Viktor Khryapa, Nikos Chatzivrettas, Sergei Monia, Sergei Panov, Alexander Bashminov, Zakhar Pashutin, Alexei Savrasenko, Evgeniy Pashutin, Nikolai Padius, Andrei Sheiko, Chris Gatling (Coach: Dušan Ivković)

2nd in Top 16 Group: Maccabi Tel Aviv (Israel) Nikola Vujčić, Beno Udrih, Quincy Lewis, Marcus Gorée, Hüseyin Beşok, Tal Burstein, Derrick Sharp, Gur Shelef, David Bluthenthal, Yoav Saffar, Lior Lubin, Yotam Halperin, Doron Sheffer

2nd in Top 16 Group: Efes Pilsen Istanbul (Turkey) Marcus Brown, Kaspars Kambala, Antonio Granger, Jurica Golemac, Kaya Peker, Kerem Tunçeri, Asım Pars, Ömer Onan, Alper Yılmaz, Ender Arslan

2nd in Top 16 Group: Olympiacos Piraeus (Greece) Maurice Evans, Nenad Marković, DeMarco Johnson, Milan Tomić, Iñaki de Miguel, Nikos Boudouris, Juan Antonio Morales, Georgios Giannouzakos, Christos Charisis, Georgios Printezis, Panagiotis Mantzanas, Savo Đikanović, Eyinmisan Nikagbatse, Mark Bradtke, Veljko Mršić, Kenny Miller

2nd in Top 16 Group: Fortitudo Skipper Bologna (Italy) Carlos Delfino, Luboš Bartoň, Gianluca Basile, Mate Skelin, Giacomo Galanda, Vlado Šćepanović, Gianmarco Pozzecco, Emilio Kovačić, Tomas Van Den Spiegel, Stefano Mancinelli, Robert Fultz, A.J. Guyton, Vedran Pusić, Patricio Prato, Mattia Suero

ULEB CUP

Winner: Pamesa Valencia (Spain) Dejan Tomašević, Fabricio Oberto, Bernard Hopkins, Alejandro Montecchia, Federico Kammerichs, Jose Antonio Paraiso, Victor Luengo, Nacho Rodilla, Alessandro Abbio, Pedro Robles, Asier García (basketball, born 1978), Oliver Arteaga, Brian Cardinal (Coach: Paco Olmos)

Runner-up: Krka Novo Mesto (Slovenia) Jamie Arnold, Márton Báder, Aleksandar Ćapin, Marko Maravić, Slavko Duščak, Vladimir Anzulović, Miloš Paravinja, Samo Grum, Boris Gnjidić, Dragiša Drobnjak, Jure Balažić, Donte Mathis, Miloš Mirković, Igor Ivašković (Coach: Neven Spahija)

Semifinalist: Joventut Badalona (Spain) Žan Tabak, Maceo Baston, Juan Espil, Nikola Radulović, Rafael Jofresa, Paco Vázquez, Antonio Bueno, Carles Marco, Souleymane Drame, Mehdi Labeyrie, Zendon Hamilton, Paul Shirley, Todd Fuller, Josep Maria Guzmán, Rudy Fernández, Josep Maria Ortega, Albert Roma

Semifinalist: Adecco Estudiantes Madrid (Spain) Corey Brewer, Nikola Lončar, Germán Gabriel, Felipe Reyes, Andres Miso, Ignacio Azofra, Carlos Jiménez, Iker Iturbe, Hernán Jasen, Rafael Vidaurreta, Adam Keefe, Bryan Sallier, Asier García (basketball, born 1978), Jan Martín, Adrián García

FIBA EUROPE CHAMPIONS CUP

Winner: Aris Thessaloniki (Greece) Willie Solomon, Ryan Stack, Ivan Grgat, Fedor Likholitov, Prodromos Nikolaidis, Ioannis Lappas, Ioannis Gagaloudis, Dimitar Angelov, Miroslav Raičević, Dimitris Charitopoulos, Nikos Orfanos, Kostas Kakaroudis, Dimitris Merachtsakis (Coach: Vangelis Alexandris)

Runner-up: Prokom Trefl Sopot (Poland) Joseph McNaull, Goran Jagodnik, Jiri Zidek, Tomas Masiulis, Josip Vranković, Dragan Marković, Drew Barry, Darius Maskoliūnas, Jacek Krzykala, Tomasz Jankowski, Filip Dylewicz, Tomasz Wilczek, Todd Fuller, Daniel Blumczynski (Coach: Eugeniusz Kijewski)

Third: BK Ventspils (Latvia) Mire Chatman, Ainars Bagatskis, Sandis Buškevics, Mārtiņš Skirmants, Kristaps Purnis, Arnis Vecvagars, Eric Poole, Jevgenijs Kosuskins, Bruno Petersons, Juris Umbraško, Dainis Obersats, Renards Zeltins

Fourth: Hemofarm Vršac (Yugoslavia) Milenko Topić, Darko Miličić, Nebojša Bogavac, Michael Campbell, Petar Popović, Saša Vasiljević, Andrija Ćirić, Dragoljub Vidačić, Đorđe Đogo, Ivan Stefanović, Luka Vučinić, Miljan Pupović, Vukašin Aleksić, Predrag Materić

== 2003–04 ==
EUROLEAGUE

Winner: Maccabi Tel Aviv (Israel) Šarūnas Jasikevičius, Anthony Parker, Nikola Vujčić, Maceo Baston, Derrick Sharp, Tal Burstein, David Bluthenthal, Deon Thomas, Gur Shelef, Yotam Halperin, Bruno Šundov, Yoav Saffar, Avi Ben-Chimol, Anton Kazarnovski (Coach: Pini Gershon)

Runner-up: Fortitudo Skipper Bologna (Italy) Miloš Vujanić, Carlos Delfino, Matjaž Smodiš, Gianluca Basile, Hanno Möttölä, Gianmarco Pozzecco, Tomas Van Den Spiegel, Erazem Lorbek, A.J. Guyton, Marco Belinelli, Stefano Mancinelli, Patricio Prato, Robert Fultz (Coach: Jasmin Repeša)

Third: CSKA Moscow (Russia) Marcus Brown, Victor Alexander, Jon Robert Holden, Mirsad Türkcan, Theodoros Papaloukas, Dragan Tarlać, Viktor Khryapa, Sergei Panov, Sergei Monia, Alexei Savrasenko, Alexander Bashminov, Anton Yudin, Egor Vialtsev, Giorgi Tsintsadze (Coach: Dušan Ivković)

Fourth: Montepaschi Siena (Italy) Bootsy Thornton, David Vanterpool, Vrbica Stefanov, Mindaugas Žukauskas, Roberto Chiacig, Giacomo Galanda, David Andersen, Michalis Kakiouzis, Dušan Vukčević, Luca Vitali (Coach: Carlo Recalcati)

2nd in Top 16 Group: Benetton Treviso (Italy) Tyus Edney, Maurice Evans, Jorge Garbajosa, Denis Marconato, Riccardo Pittis, Marcelo Nicola, Massimo Bulleri, Guilherme Giovannoni, Uroš Slokar, Martin Ides, Andrea Bargnani, Jermaine Jackson, Alberto D'Inca, Gino Cuccarolo, Francesco Corradini, Manuchar Markoishvili, Samuele Podestà

2nd in Top 16 Group: Efes Pilsen Istanbul (Turkey) Trajan Langdon, Antonio Granger, Goran Nikolić, Nikola Prkačin, Ermal Kuqo, Ender Arslan, Kaya Peker, Ömer Onan, Kerem Tunçeri, Alper Yılmaz, Valentin Pastal, Selim Saygin

2nd in Top 16 Group: TAU Ceramica Vitoria (Spain) Arvydas Macijauskas, Andrés Nocioni, Luis Scola, Kornél Dávid, Andrew Betts, Pablo Prigioni, José Calderón, Tiago Splitter, Sergi Vidal, Javi Buesa, Stefan Ivanović, Asier Arzallus, Dušan Jelić, Dejan Koturović

2nd in Top 16 Group: Pamesa Valencia (Spain) Antoine Rigaudeau, Dejan Tomašević, Fabricio Oberto, Alejandro Montecchia, Dimos Dikoudis, Jose Antonio Paraiso, Federico Kammerichs, Robert Pack, Victor Luengo, Asier García (basketball, born 1978), Alessandro Abbio, Pedro Llompart, Marko Popović, Javier Rodríguez, Jose Amador, Fabricio Vay

ULEB CUP

Winner: Hapoel Migdal Jerusalem (Israel) Willie Solomon, Doron Sheffer, Kelly McCarty, Tunji Awojobi, Erez Katz, Moshe Mizrahi, Amir Muchtari, Ido Kozikaro, Yoni Shahar, Raviv Limonad, Elad Eliyahu, Bill Edwards, Eric Washington, Yuval Naimy, Georgi Osadahi (Coach: Sharon Drucker)

Runner-up: Real Madrid (Spain) Kaspars Kambala, Elmer Bennett, Antonis Fotsis, Alberto Herreros, Mario Stojić, Pat Burke, Álex Mumbrú, Antonio Bueno, Lucas Victoriano, Alfonso Reyes, Eduardo Hernández-Sonseca, Roberto Núñez, José Ángel Antelo, Alberto Aspe (Coach: Julio César Lamas)

Semifinalist: Adecco Estudiantes Madrid (Spain) Corey Brewer, Nikola Lončar, Andrae Patterson, Felipe Reyes, Carlos Jiménez, Hernán Jasen, Ignacio Azofra, Iker Iturbe, Andres Miso, Rafael Vidaurreta, Jan Martín, Adrián García

Semifinalist: Reflex Belgrade (Serbia and Montenegro) Kimani Ffriend, Ognjen Aškrabić, Reggie Freeman, Ivan Zoroski, Bojan Popović, Vanja Plisnić, Saša Stefanović, Branko Jorović, Bojan Krstović, Milan Majstorović, Vukašin Mandić, Mile Ilić, Nikola Vasić, Michael Smith, Nemanja Aleksandrov, Zoran Erceg, Dragan Labović

FIBA EUROPE LEAGUE

Winner: UNICS Kazan (Russia) Chris Anstey, Saulius Štombergas, Martin Müürsepp, Eurelijus Žukauskas, LaMarr Greer, Valentin Kubrakov, Nikolai Khryapa, Petr Samoilenko, Alexander Miloserdov, Alexei Zozulin, Victor Keyru, Alexei Lobanov, Vladimir Shevel, Taras Osipov (Coach: Stanislav Eremin)

Runner-up: Maroussi Athens (Greece) Andre Hutson, Roderick Blakney, Ivan Grgat, Oliver Popović, Prodromos Nikolaidis, Aleksandar Smiljanić, Georgios Karagoutis, Vassilis Spanoulis, Lazaros Agadakos, Stavros Daniil, Georgios Tsiakos, Kostas Gagaoudakis, Angelos Siamandouras, Dimitris Lolas, Nikos Moutoupas (Coach: Panagiotis Giannakis)

Third: Hapoel Tel Aviv (Israel) Michael Wright, Virginijus Praškevičius, Jasmin Hukić, Yaniv Green, Lior Lubin, Dror Hagag, Matan Naor, A.J. Guyton, Or Eytan, Igor Simin, Israel Sheinfeld, Tomer Axebrad, Sar Kochavi

Fourth: Ural Great Perm (Russia) Mahmoud Abdul-Rauf, Kšyštof Lavrinovič, Sergei Chikalkin, Ruslan Avleev, Zakhar Pashutin, Valeri Daineko, Vincent Jones, Stevan Nađfeji, Michael Johnson, Sandis Buškevics, Raimonds Vaikulis, Ivo Josipović, Darren Fenn, Aleksander Belov, Fedor Dmitriev, Dimitri Poltavsky, Anton Belov

FIBA EUROPE CUP

Winner: Mitteldeutscher Weissenfels (Germany) Marijonas Petravičius, Misan Nikagbatse, Wendell Alexis, Sebastian Machowski, Stephen Arigbabu, Paul Burke, Jonas Elvikis, Martin Ringstrom, Manuchar Markoishvili, Peter Fehse, Michael Krikemans, Chauncey La Mont Leslie, Paul Bayer (Coach: Henrik Dettmann)

Runner-up: SAOS JDA Dijon Bourgogne (France) Jerome Monnet, Rowan Barrett, Paccelis Morlende, Laurent Bernard, Vakhtang Natsvlishvili, Dimitri Lauwers, Marcin Stefanski, Bruno Hamm, Viktor Sanikidze, Derrick Davenport, Steven Ganmavo, Cedric Mansare, Clement Perrin, Rodoljub Pavlović (Coach: Nicolas Fauré)

== 2004–05 ==
EUROLEAGUE

Winner: Maccabi Tel Aviv (Israel) Šarūnas Jasikevičius, Anthony Parker, Nikola Vujčić, Maceo Baston, Deon Thomas, Nestoras Kommatos, Derrick Sharp, Tal Burstein, Yaniv Green, Gur Shelef, Yotam Halperin, Assaf Dotan (Coach: Pini Gershon)

Runner-up: TAU Ceramica Vitoria (Spain) Luis Scola, Arvydas Macijauskas, José Calderón, Travis Hansen, Kornél Dávid, Andrew Betts, Tiago Splitter, Pablo Prigioni, Sergi Vidal, Robert Conley, Roberto Gabini, Omar Quintero (Coach: Duško Ivanović)

Third: Panathinaikos Athens (Greece) Dimitris Diamantidis, Jaka Lakovič, İbrahim Kutluay, Mike Batiste, Fragiskos Alvertis, Vlado Šćepanović, Patrick Femerling, Nikos Chatzivrettas, Lonny Baxter, Darryl Middleton, Georgios Kalaitzis, Kostas Tsartsaris, Dimitris Papanikolau, Dušan Šakota, Tracy Murray (Coach: Željko Obradović)

Fourth: CSKA Moscow (Russia) Marcus Brown, Jon Robert Holden, Antonio Granger, David Andersen, Theodoros Papaloukas, Martin Müürsepp, Dimos Dikoudis, Alexei Savrasenko, Sergei Monia, Sergei Panov, Zakhar Pashutin, Vasili Zavoruev, Yaroslav Korolev (Coach: Dušan Ivković)

Quarterfinalist: Efes Pilsen Istanbul (Turkey) Willie Solomon, Henry Domercant, Goran Nikolić, Nikola Prkačin, Dušan Kecman, Ermal Kuqo, Kaya Peker, Ender Arslan, Mustafa Abi, Alper Yılmaz, Cenk Akyol, Barış Ermiş, Valentin Pastal

Quarterfinalist: Ulker Istanbul (Turkey) Serkan Erdoğan, Saulius Štombergas, Eurelijus Žukauskas, Kerem Gönlüm, Virginijus Praškevičius, Dušan Vukčević, Kerem Tunçeri, Tutku Açık, Fatih Solak, Ersan İlyasova, Oğuz Savaş, Dion Glover, David Jackson

Quarterfinalist: Benetton Treviso (Italy) Ramūnas Šiškauskas, Marlon Garnett, Marcus Gorée, Massimo Bulleri, Joey Beard, Denis Marconato, David Bluthenthal, Paccelis Morlende, Matteo Soragna, Andrea Bargnani, Uroš Slokar, Olivier Ilunga, Luca Sottana, Gabriel Szalay, Agostino Li Vecchi

Quarterfinalist: Scavolini Pesaro (Italy) Charles Smith, Scoonie Penn, Marko Milič, Hanno Möttölä, Robert Archibald, Alessandro Frosini, Teemu Rannikko, Tomas Ress, Matteo Malaventura, Silvio Gigena, Germán Scarone, James Forrest, Aleksandar Đorđević, Giovanni Tomassini, Andrea Lagioia

ULEB CUP

Winner: Lietuvos Rytas Vilnius (Lithuania) Robertas Javtokas, Roberts Štelmahers, Haris Mujezinović, Gintaras Einikis, Tyrone Nesby, Fred House, Simas Jasaitis, Tomas Delininkaitis, Andrius Šležas, Saulius Kuzminskas, Rolandas Jarutis, Povilas Čukinas, Mindaugas Lukauskis, Kęstutis Šeštokas (Coach: Tomo Mahorič)

Runner-up: Makedonikos Kozani (Greece) Slaven Rimac, Andre Hutson, Pete Mickeal, Nenad Čanak, Grigorij Khizhnyak, Dragan Lukovski, Manolis Papamakarios, Alekos Petroulas, Panagiotis Kafkis, Dimitrios Spanoulis, Kostas Charalampidis, Dušan Kecman, Argirios Daliaris, Dušan Jelić, Sokratis Gizogiannis, Scoonie Penn (Coach: Argyris Pedoulakis)

Semifinalist: Pamesa Valencia (Spain) Igor Rakočević, Dejan Tomašević, Fabricio Oberto, Alejandro Montecchia, Federico Kammerichs, Pedro Llompart, Victor Luengo, Alex Urtasun, Óscar Yebra, Oliver Arteaga, Germaine Jackson, Cyril Julian, Ademola Okulaja, Antoine Rigaudeau, Robert Archibald, Bryce Drew, Alvin Jones, Asier García (basketball, born 1978)

Semifinalist: Hemofarm Vršac (Serbia and Montenegro) Milenko Topić, Nebojša Bogavac, Vonteego Cummings, Jasmin Hukić, Petar Popović, Bojan Bakić, Saša Vasiljević, Savo Đikanović, Vladimir Tica, Antonio Meeking, Milutin Aleksić, Miloš Borisov, Nenad Mišanović, Boris Savović, Miljan Rakić

FIBA EUROPE LEAGUE

Winner: Dynamo Saint Petersburg (Russia) Kelly McCarty, Ognjen Aškrabić, Ed Cota, Jón Arnór Stefánsson, Vladimir Veremeenko, Andrei Ivanov, Vladimir Shevel, Denis Khloponin, David Bluthenthal, Mate Milisa, Andrei Sepelev, Igor Krotenkov, Anatoli Goritskov, Dramir Zibirov (Coach: David Blatt)

Runner-up: BC Kyiv (Ukraine) Marcelo Nicola, Krešimir Lončar, Sergei Chikalkin, LaMarr Greer, Marcus Norris, Ioannis Giannoulis, Andri Lebediev, Edmunds Valeiko, Nikolai Khryapa, Veljko Mršić, Oleg Saltovets, Oleksiy Pecherov, Viktor Herasymchuk, Dmytro Dyatlovsky, Volodimir Orlenko (Coach: Renato Pasquali)

Third: Khimki Moscow Region (Russia) Óscar Torres, Melvin Booker, Rubén Wolkowyski, Vasily Karasev, Alexander Petrenko, Alexei Savkov, Denis Ershov, Vladimir Vuksanović, Igor Zamanski, Mikhail Soloviev, Sergei Krasnikov, Roman Levter

Fourth: Fenerbahçe Istanbul (Turkey) Damir Mršić, Marc Salyers, Chris Booker, Trevor Harvey, Ömer Onan, Erdal Bibo, Rasim Başak, Emre Ekim, Baris Guney, Zeki Gülay, Altan Cetinkaya, Levent Bilgin, Doğuş Balbay

FIBA EUROPE CUP

Winner: CSU Asesoft Ploiești (Romania) Cătălin Burlacu, Nikola Bulatović, Vladimir Kuzmanović, Ivan Krasić, George Helcioiu, Rares-Sorin Apostol, Marko Rakočević, Antonio Alexe, Levente Szijarto, Predrag Materić, Nicolae-Gabriel Toader, Marko Peković, Adrian Tudor, Sasa Ocokoljić (Coach: Mladen Jojić)

Runner-up: Lokomotiv Rostov (Russia) Jarod Stevenson, Lee Matthews, Danny Lewis, Artūras Masiulis, Konstantin Nesterov, Igor Kudelin, Giedrius Gustas, Evgeni Voronov, Dimitri Sokolov, Andrei Babichev, Alexei Zozulin, Vadim Panin, Denis Pavlov, Dimitri Cheremnykh (Coach: Vladimir Tsinman / Gennadi Samarski / Aleksandar Petrović)

== 2005–06 ==
EUROLEAGUE

Winner: CSKA Moscow (Russia) Jon Robert Holden, Trajan Langdon, David Vanterpool, Theodoros Papaloukas, Matjaž Smodiš, David Andersen, Alexei Savrasenko, Tomas Van Den Spiegel, Sergei Panov, Zakhar Pashutin, Nikita Kurbanov, Vasili Zavoruev, Vladimir Dyachok, Anatoli Kashirov, Nikita Shabalkin (Coach: Ettore Messina)

Runner-up: Maccabi Tel Aviv (Israel) Anthony Parker, Nikola Vujčić, Maceo Baston, Willie Solomon, Jamie Arnold, Tal Burstein, Derrick Sharp, Kirk Penney, Yaniv Green, Sharon Shason, Assaf Dotan, Omri Casspi (Coach: Pini Gershon)

Third: TAU Ceramica Vitoria (Spain) Luis Scola, Pablo Prigioni, Serkan Erdoğan, Kornél Dávid, Travis Hansen, Tiago Splitter, Roko-Leni Ukić, Predrag Drobnjak, Sergi Vidal, Casey Jacobsen, Lionel Chalmers, Jordi Grimau, Óscar García (Coach: Velimir Perasović)

Fourth: Winterthur FC Barcelona (Spain) Juan Carlos Navarro, Gregor Fučka, Shammond Williams, Bootsy Thornton, Gianluca Basile, Michalis Kakiouzis, Denis Marconato, Rodrigo de la Fuente, Jordi Trias, Roger Grimau, Marc Gasol, Víctor Sada, Miloš Vujanić, Ed Cota (Coach: Duško Ivanović)

Quarterfinalist: Panathinaikos Athens (Greece) Dimitris Diamantidis, Jaka Lakovič, Vlado Šćepanović, Vassilis Spanoulis, Fragiskos Alvertis, Mike Batiste, Dejan Tomašević, Nikos Chatzivrettas, Georgios Kalaitzis, Kostas Tsartsaris, Dimitris Papanikolau, Patrick Femerling, Dušan Šakota, Brandon Hunter

Quarterfinalist: Olympiacos Piraeus (Greece) Tyus Edney, Sofoklis Schortsanitis, Quincy Lewis, Andrija Žižić, Renaldas Seibutis, Nikos Chatzis, Nikos Barlos, Panagiotis Vasilopoulos, Christos Charissis, Manolis Papamakarios, Lazaros Agadakos, Georgios Printezis, Ivan Koljević, Nikos Argyropoulos, Dimitris Kalaitzidis, Matt Freije

Quarterfinalist: Efes Pilsen Istanbul (Turkey) Antonio Granger, Marko Popović, Nikola Prkačin, Henry Domercant, Kerem Gönlüm, Ermal Kuqo, Kaya Peker, Ender Arslan, Cenk Akyol, Mustafa Abi, Alper Yılmaz, Barış Ermiş, Mutlu Demir

Quarterfinalist: Real Madrid (Spain) Louis Bullock, Igor Rakočević, Venson Hamilton, Mickaël Gelabale, Moustapha Sonko, Felipe Reyes, Alex Scales, Eduardo Hernández-Sonseca, Axel Hervelle, Marko Tomas, Nedžad Sinanović, Héctor García, Josh Fisher, Óscar González, Roberto Núñez

ULEB CUP

Winner: Dynamo Moscow (Russia) Mire Chatman, Lazaros Papadopoulos, Ruben Douglas, Antonis Fotsis, Hanno Möttölä, Fedor Likholitov, Bojan Popović, Dmitri Domani, Valentin Kubrakov, Sergei Bykov, Yuri Vasiliev, Sergei Romanov, Giorgi Tsintsadze, Ivan Shiryaev (Coach: Dušan Ivković)

Runner-up: Aris Thessaloniki (Greece) Ryan Stack, Corey Brewer, Mike Wilkinson, Terrel Castle, Alexander Koul, Georgios Sigalas, Kenny Taylor, Nikolai Padius, Antonis Asimakopoulos, Dimitris Charitopoulos, Nikos Orfanos, Savas Kamperidis, Vladimir Petrović, Dimitris Karadolamis, Marios Matalon (Coach: Andrea Mazzon)

Semifinalist: Hapoel Migdal Jerusalem (Israel) Horace Jenkins, Mario Austin, Meir Tapiro, Roger Mason, Matan Naor, Tamar Slay, Erez Markovich, Ido Kozikaro, Guy Kantor, Yizhaq Ohanon, Raviv Limonad, Eilon Zagury

Semifinalist: Hemofarm Vršac (Serbia and Montenegro) Robert Conley, Milenko Topić, Zlatko Bolić, Nebojša Joksimović, Vladan Vukosavljević, Rashad Wright, Slavko Stefanović, Miljan Rakić, Savo Đikanović, Miloš Marković, Velimir Radinović, Branko Jereminov, Boris Savović, Uroš Nikolić, Miloš Borisov, Miljan Pupović

FIBA EUROCUP

Winner: Joventut Badalona (Spain) Rudy Fernández, Elmer Bennett, Luboš Bartoň, Andrew Betts, Paco Vázquez, Álex Mumbrú, Robert Archibald, Jesse Young, Aloysius Anagonye, Marcelinho Huertas, Dimitri Flis, Andre Turner, Ricky Rubio, Pau Ribas, Henk Norel (Coach: Aíto García Reneses)

Runner-up: Khimki Moscow Region (Russia) Óscar Torres, Rubén Wolkowyski, Melvin Booker, Gianmarco Pozzecco, Boris Gorenc, Alexander Petrenko, Denis Ershov, Vitaly Fridzon, Sergei Krasnikov, Alexei Savkov, Mikhail Soloviev, Roman Levter, Ademola Okulaja, Sergei Karaulov, Andrei Tsypatchev (Coach: Sergei Elevich)

Third: BC Kyiv (Ukraine) Ratko Varda, Goran Nikolić, Dušan Kecman, Krešimir Lončar, Dragan Lukovski, LaMarr Greer, Michael Harris, Guilherme Giovannoni, Leonid Iailo, Andri Lebediev, Afik Nissim, Artem Butsky, Mark Jones, Oleg Saltovets, Shahar Gordon

Fourth: Dynamo St.Petersburg (Russia) Kelly McCarty, Ognjen Aškrabić, Vladimir Veremeenko, Jerry McCullough, Darryl Middleton, Grigorij Khizhnyak, Damir Miljković, Denis Khloponin, Andrei Ivanov, Victor Keyru, Dramir Zibirov, Igor Krotenkov, Taras Osipov, Alexei Surovtsev

FIBA EUROCUP CHALLENGE

Winner: Ural Great Perm (Russia) Terrell Lyday, Jurica Golemac, Jasmin Hukić, Vasily Karasev, Andrei Trushkin, Egor Vyaltsev, Vadim Panin, Derrick Alston, Andre Hutson, Aleksandr Dedushkin, Arseni Kuchinsky, Evgeni Kolesnikov, Vyacheslav Shushakov, Artem Kuzyakin (Coach: Sharon Drucker)

Runner-up: Khimik Yuzhny (Ukraine) Dubravko Zemljić, Aleksandar Subara, Yaroslav Zubrytsky, Dragan Dojčin, Andriy Korochkin, Andriy Agafonov, Juris Umbraško, Oleg Yushkin, Aleksandar Đurić, Ricky Moore, Kęstutis Šeštokas, Linas Juknevičius, Vladimir Tica, Jarius Tibius Glenn, Oleksandr Kolchenko, Elvir Ovčina (Coach: Zvezdan Mitrović)

== 2006–07 ==
EUROLEAGUE

Winner: Panathinaikos Athens (Greece) Ramūnas Šiškauskas, Dimitris Diamantidis, Mike Batiste, Sani Bečirovič, Miloš Vujanić, Tony Delk, Dejan Tomašević, Robertas Javtokas, Kostas Tsartsaris, Dimos Dikoudis, Nikos Chatzivrettas, Fragiskos Alvertis, Dušan Šakota, Dimitris Papanikolaou, Vassilis Xanthopoulos (Coach: Željko Obradović)

Runner-up: CSKA Moscow (Russia) Jon Robert Holden, Trajan Langdon, Theodoros Papaloukas, Matjaž Smodiš, David Andersen, Óscar Torres, David Vanterpool, Tomas Van Den Spiegel, Alexei Savrasenko, Zakhar Pashutin, Anton Ponkrashov, Nikita Kurbanov, Andrei Vorontsevich, Anatoli Kashirov, Alexei Shved (Coach: Ettore Messina)

Third: Unicaja Málaga (Spain) Jiří Welsch, Pepe Sánchez, Marcus Brown, Florent Piétrus, Erazem Lorbek, Daniel Santiago, Marcus Faison, Marko Tušek, Carlos Jiménez, Berni Rodríguez, Carlos Cabezas, Kostas Vasileiadis, Iñaki de Miguel, Alfonso Sánchez, Michal Chilinsky (Coach: Sergio Scariolo)

Fourth: TAU Ceramica Vitoria (Spain) Fred House, Igor Rakočević, Luis Scola, Tiago Splitter, Pablo Prigioni, Serkan Erdoğan, Zoran Planinić, Mirza Teletović, Kaya Peker, Sergi Vidal, Jesus Cilla, Ender Arslan, Ariel Eslava, Diego Fajardo (Coach: Velimir Perasović / Ignacio Lezkano / Božidar Maljković)

Quarterfinalist: Olympiacos Piraeus (Greece) Alex Acker, Scoonie Penn, Henry Domercant, Andrija Žižić, Ryan Stack, Sofoklis Schortsanitis, Ioannis Bourousis, Nikos Barlos, Christos Charissis, Manolis Papamakarios, Panagiotis Vasilopoulos, Sam Hoskin, Vrbica Stefanov, Damir Mulaomerović, Arvydas Macijauskas, Gerry McNamara

Quarterfinalist: Winterthur FC Barcelona (Spain) Juan Carlos Navarro, Jaka Lakovič, Roko-Leni Ukić, Fran Vázquez, Gianluca Basile, Denis Marconato, Michalis Kakiouzis, Jordi Trias, Rodrigo de la Fuente, Roger Grimau, Mario Kasun, Albert Moncasi

Quarterfinalist: Maccabi Tel Aviv (Israel) Nikola Vujčić, Will Bynum, Simas Jasaitis, Jamie Arnold, Lior Eliyahu, Goran Jeretin, Derrick Sharp, Yotam Halperin, Yaniv Green, Tal Burstein, Sharon Shason, Noel Felix, Rodney Buford

Quarterfinalist: Dynamo Moscow (Russia) Antonis Fotsis, Lazaros Papadopoulos, Bojan Popović, Travis Hansen, Eddie Gill, Sergei Monia, Dmitri Domani, Sergei Bykov, Yuri Vasilyev, Obinna Ekezie, Taquan Dean, Dimitri Khvostov, Andrei Trushkin, Andrei Ivanov, Miroslav Raičević

ULEB CUP

Winner: Real Madrid (Spain) Charles Smith, Louis Bullock, Raúl López, Axel Hervelle, Ratko Varda, Marko Tomas, Kerem Tunçeri, Felipe Reyes, Álex Mumbrú, Eduardo Hernández-Sonseca, Blagota Sekulić, Richard Nguema, Venson Hamilton, Nedžad Sinanović, Marko Milič, Jan Martín, Pablo Aguilar (Coach: Joan Plaza)

Runner-up: Lietuvos Rytas Vilnius (Lithuania) Roberts Štelmahers, Matt Nielsen, João Paulo Batista, Jānis Blūms, Artūras Jomantas, Eurelijus Žukauskas, Marijonas Petravičius, Mindaugas Lukauskis, Tomas Delininkaitis, Andrius Šležas, Titus Ivory, Kareem Rush, Andre Emmett, Ivan Koljević, Darius Pakamanis, Martynas Gecevičius (Coach: Sharon Drucker / Zmago Sagadin / Aleksandar Trifunović)

Semifinalist: UNICS Kazan (Russia) Saulius Štombergas, Jarod Stevenson, Darjuš Lavrinovič, Kšyštof Lavrinovič, Yahor Meshcharakou, Duško Savanović, Petr Samoylenko, Sergei Chikalkin, Mateen Cleaves, Jerry McCullough, Vadim Panin, Igor Kudelin, Dimitri Sokolov, Konstantin Nesterov, Roman Khamitov, Alexey Zhukanenko, Alexander Miloserdov

Semifinalist: FMP Železnik Belgrade (Serbia) Miloš Teodosić, Zoran Erceg, Aleksandar Rašić, Bojan Krstović, Branko Cvetković, Ivan Žigeranović, Slobodan Popović, Dragan Labović, Marko Đerasimović, Predrag Samardžiski, Ivan Todorović, Đorđe Mičić, Nemanja Protić, Mladen Pantić, Aleksandar Pavlović

FIBA EUROCUP

Winner: Akasvayu Girona (Spain) Ariel McDonald, Bootsy Thornton, Gregor Fučka, Darryl Middleton, Dalibor Bagarić, Fernando San Emeterio, Marko Marinović, Germán Gabriel, Dainius Šalenga, Marc Gasol, Víctor Sada, Marko Kešelj (Coach: Svetislav Pešić)

Runner-up: Azovmash Mariupol (Ukraine) Khalid El-Amin, Kenan Bajramović, Panagiotis Liadelis, Slaven Rimac, Serhiy Lishchuk, Robert Gulyas, Andriy Botichev, Oleksandr Rayevsky, Oleksandr Skutyelnik, Igor Loktionov, Maksym Ivshyn, Ricardo Powell, Nikola Radulović, Germaine Jackson, Yevgeniy Podorvanny, Rodney Buford (Coach: Rimas Girskis)

Third: Virtus Europonteggi Bologna (Italy) Travis Best, Christian Drejer, Brett Blizzard, Dušan Vukčević, Vlado Ilievski, Kristoffer Lang, Guilherme Giovannoni, Andrea Michelori, Ilian Evtimov, Andrea Crosariol, Oscar Gugliotta, Riccardo Malagoli, Doremus Bennerman, Francesco Quaglia, Simone Bonfiglio, Fabio Di Bella

Fourth: Estudiantes Madrid (Spain) Will McDonald, Marlon Garnett, Hernán Jasen, Goran Nikolić, Sergio Sánchez, Caio Torres, Carlos Suárez, Gonzalo Martínez, Francisco Mendiburu, Viktor Sanikidze, Iker Iturbe, Daniel Clark

FIBA EUROCUP CHALLENGE

Winner: CSK VVS Samara (Russia) Omar Cook, Kelvin Gibbs, Nikita Shabalkin, Evgeni Voronov, Gennadi Zelenski, Yaroslav Strelkin, Pavel Agapov, Oleg Baranov, Georgios Diamantopoulos, Taras Osipov, Aleksey Kiryanov, Pavel Ulyanko, Anton Glazunov, Valery Likhodey (Coach: Valery Tikhonenko)

Runner-up: Keravnos Nicosia (Cyprus) Patrick Lee, Sirille Makanda, Victor King, Panagiotis Trisokkas, Predrag Kosanović, Giorgos Anastasiadis, Saša Mijajlović, Domagoj Vidaković, Alexander Koul, Alexandros Zachariou, Mladen Erjavec, Eleftherios Varsamos, Christodoulos Kaskiris, Želimir Stevanović, Charalambos Aristodimou, Alexandre Bougaieff (Coach: Vasilis Fragias)

== 2007–08 ==
EUROLEAGUE

Winner: CSKA Moscow (Russia) Jon Robert Holden, Trajan Langdon, Ramūnas Šiškauskas, Theodoros Papaloukas, David Andersen, Marcus Gorée, Matjaž Smodiš, Nikos Zisis, Viktor Khryapa, Tomas Van Den Spiegel, Alexei Savrasenko, Zakhar Pashutin, Andrei Vorontsevich, Anatoli Kashirov, Alexei Shved, Artem Zabelin, Nikita Kurbanov (Coach: Ettore Messina)

Runner-up: Maccabi Tel Aviv (Israel) Will Bynum, Terence Morris, Vonteego Cummings, Nikola Vujčić, Yotam Halperin, Marcus Fizer, David Bluthenthal, Esteban Batista, Omri Casspi, Alex Garcia, Lior Eliyahu, Derrick Sharp, Tal Burstein (Coach: Oded Kattash / Zvi Sherf)

Third: Montepaschi Siena (Italy) Terrell McIntyre, Bootsy Thornton, Shaun Stonerook, Benjamin Eze, Romain Sato, Vlado Ilievski, Kšyštof Lavrinovič, Rimantas Kaukėnas, Héctor Romero, Tomas Ress, Drake Diener, Marco Carraretto, Keith McLeod, Simone Berti (Coach: Simone Pianigiani)

Fourth: TAU Ceramica Vitoria (Spain) Igor Rakočević, Zoran Planinić, Tiago Splitter, Simas Jasaitis, Will McDonald, Pablo Prigioni, Mirza Teletović, Pete Mickeal, Sergi Vidal, Gabe Muoneke, James Singleton, Linton Johnson, Lucho Fernández, Ander García (Coach: Neven Spahija)

Quarterfinalist: Olympiacos Piraeus (Greece) Qyntel Woods, Lynn Greer, Marc Jackson, Roderick Blakney, Miloš Teodosić, Arvydas Macijauskas, Ioannis Bourousis, Jake Tsakalidis, Panagiotis Vasilopoulos, Georgios Printezis, Kostas Vasileiadis, Manolis Papamakarios, Panagiotis Kafkis, Loukas Mavrokefalides, Renaldas Seibutis

Quarterfinalist: AXA FC Barcelona (Spain) Alex Acker, Jaka Lakovič, Fran Vázquez, Pepe Sánchez, Gianluca Basile, Mario Kasun, Ersan İlyasova, Denis Marconato, Jordi Trias, Roger Grimau, Michel Morandais, Gary Neal, Albert Moncasi, Nihad Đedović

Quarterfinalist: Partizan Igokea Belgrade (Serbia) Milt Palacio, Nikola Peković, Novica Veličković, Dušan Kecman, Milenko Tepić, Slavko Vraneš, Uroš Tripković, Čedomir Vitkovac, Petar Božić, Dejan Borovnjak, Strahinja Milošević, Marko Đurković

Quarterfinalist: Fenerbahçe Ülker İstanbul (Turkey) Willie Solomon, James White, Tarence Kinsey, Damir Mršić, Mirsad Türkcan, Gašper Vidmar, Emir Preldžić, Ömer Onan, Oğuz Savaş, Semih Erden, Ömer Aşık, Rasim Başak, İbrahim Kutluay, Hakan Demirel, Can Maxim Mutaf

ULEB CUP

Winner: DKV Joventut Badalona (Spain) Rudy Fernández, Ricky Rubio, Luboš Bartoň, Jérôme Moïso, Jan Jagla, Demond Mallet, Petar Popović, Eduardo Hernández-Sonseca, Ferran Laviña, Pau Ribas, Pere Tomàs, Lonny Baxter, Dimitri Flis, Josep Franch (Coach: Aíto García Reneses)

Runner-up: Akasvayu Girona (Spain) Ariel McDonald, Branko Cvetković, Erik Daniels, Darryl Middleton, Marc Gasol, Maurice Whitfield, Ivan Radenović, Fernando San Emeterio, Víctor Sada, Román Montañez, Jarod Stevenson, Jackson Vroman, Tomas Nagys, Pau Llinas, Predrag Drobnjak, Albert Teruel (Coach: Pedro Martínez)

Third: Dynamo Moscow (Russia) Henry Domercant, Travis Hansen, Miloš Vujanić, Antonis Fotsis, Robertas Javtokas, Nikola Prkačin, Sergei Monia, Petr Samoylenko, Sergei Bykov, Dmitri Domani, Dimitri Khvostov, Yuri Vasilyev, Nenad Mišanović, Yaroslav Korolev, Ilya Syrovatko

Fourth: Galatasaray Cafe Crown Istanbul (Turkey) Daniel Brown, Charles Gaines, Robert Hite, Chris Owens, Hüseyin Beşok, Cenk Akyol, Cüneyt Erden, Murat Kaya, Fatih Solak, Erdem Türetken, Cemal Nalga, Britton Johnsen, Tufan Ersöz, Altay Özurganci

FIBA EUROCUP

Winner: Barons LMT Riga (Latvia) Demetrius Alexander, Giedrius Gustas, Armands Šķēle, Dainius Adomaitis, Kaspars Bērziņš, Michal Hlebowicki, Mārtiņš Kravčenko, Raimonds Vaikulis, Artūrs Brūniņš, Joao Paulo Lopes Batista, Rinalds Sirsniņš, Tomas Nagys (Coach: Kārlis Muižnieks)

Runner-up: Dexia Mons-Hainaut (Belgium) Mike Lenzly, Nate Reinking, James Cantamessa, Ben Ebong, Andrew Sullivan, Roger Huggins, Travis Conlan, James Potter, Niels Marnegrave, Alexandre Libert, Thomas Bauwens, George Evans, Lorenzo Giancaterino (Coach: Chris Finch)

Third: Proteas EKA AEL Limassol (Cyprus) Duane Woodward, Ryan Randle, Milutin Aleksić, Karim Souchu, Bruno Šundov, Vasili Zavoruev, Aleksandar Čuić, Alexandros Liatsos, Maxime Zianveni, Olivier Ilunga, Ali Bouziane, Konstantinos Perentos, Georgios Palalas, Arseni Kuchinsky

Fourth: Tartu USK Rock (Estonia) Giorgi Tsintsadze, Brian Cusworth, Gert Kullamäe, Janar Talts, Tanel Tein, Kęstutis Šeštokas, Marek Doronin, Vallo Allingu, Silver Leppik, Asko Paade

== 2008–09 ==
EUROLEAGUE

Winner: Panathinaikos Athens (Greece) Šarūnas Jasikevičius, Dimitris Diamantidis, Vassilis Spanoulis, Mike Batiste, Nikola Peković, Drew Nicholas, Antonis Fotsis, Dušan Kecman, Kostas Tsartsaris, Stratos Perperoglou, Nikos Chatzivrettas, Dušan Šakota, Fragiskos Alvertis, Giorgi Shermadini (Coach: Željko Obradović)

Runner-up: CSKA Moscow (Russia) Jon Robert Holden, Trajan Langdon, Ramūnas Šiškauskas, Terence Morris, Matjaž Smodiš, Zoran Planinić, Erazem Lorbek, Nikos Zisis, Viktor Khryapa, Sasha Kaun, Alexei Savrasenko, Andrei Vorontsevich, Victor Keyru, Alexei Shved (Coach: Ettore Messina)

Third: Regal FC Barcelona (Spain) Juan Carlos Navarro, Jaka Lakovič, David Andersen, Daniel Santiago, Fran Vázquez, Ersan İlyasova, Gianluca Basile, Luboš Bartoň, Víctor Sada, Roger Grimau, Jordi Trias, Andre Barrett, Nihad Đedović, Xavi Rey, Mamadou Samb (Coach: Xavi Pascual)

Fourth: Olympiacos Piraeus (Greece) Josh Childress, Nikola Vujčić, Miloš Teodosić, Lynn Greer, Theodoros Papaloukas, Yotam Halperin, Zoran Erceg, Sofoklis Schortsanitis, Jannero Pargo, Ioannis Bourousis, Georgios Printezis, Michalis Pelekanos, Panagiotis Vasilopoulos, Ian Vougioukas, Igor Milošević (Coach: Panagiotis Giannakis)

Quarterfinalist: Montepaschi Siena (Italy) Terrell McIntyre, Henry Domercant, Shaun Stonerook, Romain Sato, Benjamin Eze, Rimantas Kaukėnas, Kšyštof Lavrinovič, Tomas Ress, Morris Finley, Luca Lechthaler, Ariel McDonald, Marco Carraretto, Simone Centanni, Nika Metreveli

Quarterfinalist: TAU Ceramica Vitoria (Spain) Igor Rakočević, Pablo Prigioni, Will McDonald, Tiago Splitter, Pete Mickeal, Mirza Teletović, Fernando San Emeterio, Sergi Vidal, Stanko Barać, Vlado Ilievski, Mustafa Shakur, Ariel Eslava, Robert Hite, Matías Nocedal

Quarterfinalist: Real Madrid (Spain) Louis Bullock, Jeremiah Massey, Raúl López, Quinton Hosley, Felipe Reyes, Axel Hervelle, Marko Tomas, Pepe Sánchez, Tomas Van Den Spiegel, Álex Mumbrú, Sergio Llull, Kennedy Winston, Venson Hamilton, Lazaros Papadopoulos, Nikola Mirotić, Javier Pérez

Quarterfinalist: Partizan Belgrade (Serbia) Stéphane Lasme, Jan Veselý, Milenko Tepić, Novica Veličković, Slavko Vraneš, Aleksandar Rašić, Petar Božić, Uroš Tripković, Čedomir Vitkovac, Žarko Rakočević, Strahinja Milošević, Vukašin Aleksić, Nemanja Bešović

EUROCUP BASKETBALL

Winner: Lietuvos Rytas Vilnius (Lithuania) Chuck Eidson, Milko Bjelica, Mindaugas Lukauskis, Marijonas Petravičius, Donatas Zavackas, Artūras Jomantas, Steponas Babrauskas, Martynas Gecevičius, Evaldas Dainys, Justas Sinica, Branko Milisavljević, Marius Prekevičius, Michailas Anisimovas, Lukas Brazdauskis (Coach: Antanas Sireika / Rimas Kurtinaitis)

Runner-up: Khimki Moscow Region (Russia) Kelly McCarty, Jorge Garbajosa, Milt Palacio, Mike Wilkinson, Teemu Rannikko, Carlos Delfino, Vitaly Fridzon, Anton Ponkrashov, Timofey Mozgov, Nikita Shabalkin, Victor Dubovitskiy, Maciej Lampe, Ratko Varda, Jérôme Moïso, Vladimir Dyachok, Viacheslav Zaytsev (Coach: Kęstutis Kemzūra / Oleg Meleshchenko / Sergio Scariolo)

Semifinalist: iurbentia Bilbao Basket (Spain) Quincy Lewis, Luke Recker, Marko Banić, Jānis Blūms, Renaldas Seibutis, Damir Markota, Drago Pašalić, Predrag Savović, Paco Vázquez, Salvador Guardia, Javier Salgado, Frédéric Weis, Tomas Hampl

Semifinalist: Hemofarm Stada Vršac (Serbia) Stefan Marković, Bojan Krstović, Nebojša Joksimović, Boban Marjanović, Milan Mačvan, Milivoje Božović, Miloš Borisov, Miljan Pavković, Boris Savović, Petar Despotović, Márton Báder, Vladan Vukosavljević, Uroš Petrović

FIBA EUROCHALLENGE

Winner: Virtus BolognaFiere (Italy) Keith Langford, Sharrod Ford, Earl Boykins, Roberto Chiacig, Guilherme Giovannoni, Petteri Koponen, Dušan Vukčević, Alex Righetti, Reyshawn Terry, Brett Blizzard, Federico Lestini, Riccardo Malagoli, Jamie Arnold, Riccardo Moraschini (Coach: Matteo Boniciolli)

Runner-up: Cholet Basket (France) Nando de Colo, Kevin Braswell, Rodrigue Beaubois, Vincent Grier, Claude Marquis, Randal Falker, Thomas Larrouquis, Michael Mokongo, Antywane Robinson, Kevin Seraphin, Alan Wiggins, Steeve Ho You Fat, Christophe Léonard, Michael Lee (Coach: Erman Kunter)

Third: Triumph Lyubertsy Moscow Region (Russia) Marcus Gorée, Ognjen Aškrabić, Ernest Bremer, Vadim Panin, Sergei Toporov, Fedor Dmitriev, Egor Vyaltsev, Pavel Sergeev, Alexander Miloserdov, Marque Perry, Valeri Likhodey, Nenad Krstić, Alan Anderson, Kerem Tunçeri, Taras Osipov

Fourth: Proteas EKA AEL Limassol (Cyprus) Quincy Taylor, Darrel Mitchell, Aleksandar Radojević, Haris Mujezinović, Goran Nikolić, Vujadin Subotić, LaVell Blanchard, Milan Dozet, Georgios Palalas, Alexandros Liatsos, Michalis Kounounis, Goran Jeretin, Christos Loizidis, Grigoris Pantouris

== 2009–10 ==
EUROLEAGUE

Winner: Regal FC Barcelona (Spain) Juan Carlos Navarro, Ricky Rubio, Terence Morris, Jaka Lakovič, Pete Mickeal, Fran Vázquez, Boniface N'Dong, Erazem Lorbek, Gianluca Basile, Roger Grimau, Víctor Sada, Jordi Trias, Xavier Rabaseda, Luboš Bartoň (Coach: Xavi Pascual)

Runner-up: Olympiacos Piraeus (Greece) Josh Childress, Miloš Teodosić, Theodoros Papaloukas, Linas Kleiza, Nikola Vujčić, Patrick Beverley, Scoonie Penn, Sofoklis Schortsanitis, Yotam Halperin, Ioannis Bourousis, Panagiotis Vasilopoulos, Loukas Mavrokefalides, Kostas Papanikolaou, Andreas Glyniadakis, Von Wafer, Kostas Sloukas (Coach: Panagiotis Giannakis)

Third: CSKA Moscow (Russia) Jon Robert Holden, Trajan Langdon, Ramūnas Šiškauskas, Zoran Planinić, Viktor Khryapa, Sasha Kaun, Andrei Vorontsevich, Dimitri Sokolov, Anton Ponkrashov, Nikita Kurbanov, Pops Mensah-Bonsu, Victor Keyru, Ivan Radenović, Matjaž Smodiš, Alexei Shved, Artem Zabelin, Courtney Sims (Coach: Evgeniy Pashutin)

Fourth: Partizan Belgrade (Serbia) Bo McCalebb, Lawrence Roberts, Aleks Marić, Jan Veselý, Dušan Kecman, Slavko Vraneš, Petar Božić, Aleksandar Rašić, Aleksandar Mitrović, Strahinja Milošević, Branislav Đekić, Stefan Sinovec, Stevan Milošević, Žarko Rakočević, Nemanja Bešović, Vladimir Lučić (Coach: Duško Vujošević)

Quarterfinalist: Caja Laboral Vitoria (Spain) Carl English, Tiago Splitter, Mirza Teletović, Sean Singletary, Stanko Barać, Fernando San Emeterio, Pau Ribas, Marcelinho Huertas, Lior Eliyahu, Brad Oleson, Walter Herrmann, Vladimir Micov, Taquan Dean, Chris Lofton

Quarterfinalist: Real Madrid (Spain) Louis Bullock, Pablo Prigioni, Travis Hansen, Marko Jarić, Jorge Garbajosa, Rimantas Kaukėnas, Darjuš Lavrinovič, Novica Veličković, Felipe Reyes, Sergi Vidal, Sergio Llull, Ante Tomić, Vladimir Dašić, Iñaki de Miguel, Tomas Van Den Spiegel, Cheick Samb

Quarterfinalist: Maccabi Tel Aviv (Israel) Chuck Eidson, D'or Fischer, Alan Anderson, Andrew Wisniewski, Stéphane Lasme, Doron Perkins, Yaniv Green, Guy Pnini, David Bluthenthal, Raviv Limonad, Derrick Sharp, Maciej Lampe, Tomer Bar Even, Gal Mekel

Quarterfinalist: Asseco Prokom Gdynia (Poland) Qyntel Woods, David Logan, Ronnie Burrell, Lorinza Harrington, Daniel Ewing, Adam Hrycaniuk, Piotr Szczotka, Jan Jagla, Ratko Varda, Adam Lapeta, Przemysław Zamojski, Lukasz Seweryn, Pape Sow, Mateusz Kostrzewski, Tyrone Brazelton

EUROCUP BASKETBALL

Winner: Power Electronics Valencia (Spain) Matt Nielsen, Kosta Perović, Florent Piétrus, Víctor Claver, Serhiy Lishchuk, Marko Marinović, Nando de Colo, Rafa Martínez, Thomas Kelati, José Simeón, Iván García, Tornike Shengelia, Bozhidar Avramov, Hector Piquer, Giorgi Sharabidze (Coach: Neven Spahija)

Runner-up: Alba Berlin (Germany) Rashad Wright, Immanuel McElroy, Blagota Sekulić, Julius Jenkins, Dragan Dojčin, Derrick Byars, Steffen Hamann, Adam Chubb, Jurica Golemac, Cemal Nalga, Philip Zwiener, Kenan Bajramović, Lucca Staiger (Coach: Luka Pavićević)

Third: Bizkaia Bilbao Basket (Spain) Chris Warren, Marko Banić, Jérôme Moïso, Damir Markota, Axel Hervelle, Jānis Blūms, Renaldas Seibutis, Álex Mumbrú, Javier Rodríguez, Paco Vázquez, Javier Salgado, Robert Conley, Salvador Guardia, Tomas Hampl

Fourth: Panellinios Opap Athens (Greece) Roderick Blakney, Devin Smith, Đuro Ostojić, Georgios Kalaitzis, Ian Vougioukas, Manolis Papamakarios, Kostas Charalampidis, Joshua Davis, Alekos Petroulas, Vassilis Xanthopoulos, Britton Johnsen, Chris Owens, Ioannis Georgallis, Markos Kolokas

FIBA EUROCHALLENGE

Winner: BG Göttingen (Germany) Taylor Rochestie, John Little, Ben Jacobson, Michael Meeks, Jason Boone, Chris Oliver, Christopher McNaughton, Chester Frazier, Dwayne Anderson, Robert Kulawick, Antoine Jordan, Tobias Welzel, Cody Toepper, Jan Schiecke (Coach: John Patrick)

Runner-up: Krasnye Krylya Samara (Russia) J. R. Bremer, Luis Flores, Ralph Biggs, Marcus Douthit, Valdas Vasylius, Andrei Trushkin, Evgeni Voronov, Sergei Karaulov, Denis Khloponin, Andrei Ivanov, Gennadi Zelenskiy, Sergei Chernov, Artem Yakovenko, Pavel Agapov, Igor Grachev, Anton Ageev (Coach: Sergei Zozulin / Sergei Mokin / Mikhail Mikhailov)

Third: Chorale Roanne Basket (France) Ralph Mims, Uchenna Nsonwu, David Noel, Nicholas Lewis, Marc-Antoine Pellin, Dylan Page, Pape-Philippe Amagou, Ousmane Dia, Mouloukou Diabate, Etienne Brower, Blair Williams, Namory Boundy

Fourth: Scavolini Spar Pesaro (Italy) Michael Hicks, Eric Williams, Marques Green, Casey Shaw, Branko Cvetković, Dušan Šakota, Nebojša Joksimović, Daniele Cinciarini, Sam Van Rossom, Simone Flamini, Giovanni Tomassini, Andrea Gjinaj, Thomas Amici

== 2010–11 ==
EUROLEAGUE

Winner: Panathinaikos Athens (Greece) Dimitris Diamantidis, Mike Batiste, Romain Sato, Drew Nicholas, Nick Calathes, Antonis Fotsis, Milenko Tepić, Aleks Marić, Kostas Tsartsaris, Stratos Perperoglou, Ian Vougioukas, Kostas Kaimakoglou, Giorgos Bogris, Fotios Zoumpos, Ioannis Karamalegkos (Coach: Željko Obradović)

Runner-up: Maccabi Tel Aviv (Israel) Jeremy Pargo, Chuck Eidson, Sofoklis Schortsanitis, Doron Perkins, Richard Hendrix, Milan Mačvan, David Bluthenthal, Lior Eliyahu, Tal Burstein, Guy Pnini, Derrick Sharp, Yaniv Green, Elishay Kadir (Coach: David Blatt)

Third: Montepaschi Siena (Italy) Bo McCalebb, Malik Hairston, David Moss, Milovan Raković, Marko Jarić, Rimantas Kaukėnas, Kšyštof Lavrinovič, Shaun Stonerook, Nikos Zisis, Jeleel Akindele, Marco Carraretto, Tomas Ress, Andrea Michelori, Pietro Aradori, Tommaso Ingrosso (Coach: Simone Pianigiani)

Fourth: Real Madrid (Spain) Pablo Prigioni, D'or Fischer, Ante Tomić, Clay Tucker, Nikola Mirotić, Novica Veličković, Sergio Llull, Felipe Reyes, Sergio Rodríguez, Carlos Suárez, Jorge Garbajosa, Sergi Vidal, Mirza Begić, Josh Fisher, Víctor Arteaga (Coach: Ettore Messina / Emanuele Molin)

Quarterfinalist: Olympiacos Piraeus (Greece) Miloš Teodosić, Theodoros Papaloukas, Vassilis Spanoulis, Radoslav Nesterović, Matt Nielsen, Jamon Gordon, Zoran Erceg, Yotam Halperin, Marko Kešelj, Ioannis Bourousis, Kostas Papanikolaou, Loukas Mavrokefalides, Michalis Pelekanos, Andreas Glyniadakis, Panagiotis Vasilopoulos, Dimitris Katsivelis

Quarterfinalist: Regal Barcelona (Spain) Juan Carlos Navarro, Jaka Lakovič, Ricky Rubio, Alan Anderson, Terence Morris, Erazem Lorbek, Fran Vázquez, Kosta Perović, Boniface N'Dong, Joe Ingles, Pete Mickeal, Roger Grimau, Víctor Sada, Angel Aparicio, Iván García

Quarterfinalist: Caja Laboral Vitoria (Spain) David Logan, Marcelinho Huertas, Fernando San Emeterio, Mirza Teletović, Stanko Barać, Brad Oleson, Nemanja Bjelica, Esteban Batista, Pau Ribas, Pape Sow, Marcus Haislip, Martin Rančík, Dejan Musli, Ander García, Martín Buesa

Quarterfinalist: Power Electronics Valencia (Spain) Omar Cook, Robertas Javtokas, Florent Piétrus, Serhiy Lishchuk, Rafael Martínez, Duško Savanović, Nando de Colo, Jeremy Richardson, Víctor Claver, James Augustine, José Simeón, David Navarro, Marc Fernández

EUROCUP BASKETBALL

Winner: UNICS Kazan (Russia) Terrell Lyday, Kelly McCarty, Maciej Lampe, Marko Popović, Hasan Rizvić, Ricky Minard, Vladimir Veremeenko, Zakhar Pashutin, Petr Samoylenko, Slavko Vraneš, Igor Zamanskiy, Victor Zvarykin, Amiran Amirkhanov (Coach: Evgeniy Pashutin)

Runner-up: Cajasol Sevilla (Spain) Tariq Kirksay, Louis Bullock, Paul Davis, Tomáš Satoranský, Mindaugas Katelynas, Kaloyan Ivanov, Juan Jose Triguero, Jose Miguel Urtasun, Joan Sastre, Bojan Popović, Mario Cabanas, Earl Calloway, Ricardo Pampano, Beka Burjanadze, Ondřej Balvín (Coach: Joan Plaza)

Third: Cedevita Zagreb (Croatia) Dontaye Draper, Bracey Wright, Corsley Edwards, Vedran Vukušić, Damjan Rudež, Robert Troha, Tomislav Petrović, Vedran Princ, Franko Kaštropil, Marino Baždarić, Trent Plaisted, Vladimir Krstić, Hrvoje Kovačević, Dino Butorac (Coach: Aleksandar Petrović).

Fourth: Benetton Bwin Treviso (Italy) Devin Smith, Donatas Motiejūnas, Stefan Marković, Sandro Ničević, Hrvoje Perić, Brian Skinner, Greg Brunner, Massimo Bulleri, Alessandro Gentile, Jakub Wojciechowski, Ryan Toolson, Nicolo Cazzolato, Gino Cuccarolo

FIBA EUROCHALLENGE

Winner: Krka Novo Mesto (Slovenia) Goran Ikonić, Chris Booker, Dušan Đorđević, Smiljan Pavič, Zoran Dragić, Jure Balažić, Edo Murić, Dragiša Drobnjak, Bojan Krivec, Matej Rojc, Simon Petrov (Coach: Aleksandar Džikić)

Runner-up: Lokomotiv Kuban Krasnodar (Russia) Jeremiah Massey, Mike Wilkinson, Lionel Chalmers, Alando Tucker, Goran Jeretin, Alexei Surovtsev, Sergei Toporov, Grigori Shukhovtsov, Maxim Sheleketo, Maxim Grigoryev, Stanislav Makshantsev, Yuri Vasiliev, Alexei Vzdykhalkin, Chris Lofton (Coach: Kęstutis Kemzūra)

Third: Telenet Oostende (Belgium) Darrel Mitchell, Marcus Faison, Matt Lojeski, Caleb Green, Will Thomas, Veselin Petrović, Ben Ebong, Stéphane Pelle, Quentin Serron, Dušan Katnić, Alfrie Kelley, Jean Salumu, Tomas Van Den Spiegel, Trevor Huffman, Pieter Maelegheer

Fourth: Spartak Saint Petersburg (Russia) Henry Domercant, Pero Antić, Anton Ponkrashov, Miha Zupan, Petar Popović, Nikola Dragović, Alexei Kotishevski, Evgeni Kolesnikov, Patrick Beverley, Dijon Thompson, Vladimir Dyachok, Alexander Korchagin, Alexander Bashminov, Alexei Zozulin, Smush Parker

== 2011–12 ==
EUROLEAGUE

Winner: Olympiacos Piraeus (Greece) Vassilis Spanoulis, Joey Dorsey, Acie Law, Kyle Hines, Pero Antić, Marko Kešelj, Georgios Printezis, Kostas Papanikolaou, Evangelos Mantzaris, Lazaros Papadopoulos, Kostas Sloukas, Martynas Gecevičius, Michalis Pelekanos, Andreas Glyniadakis, Dimitris Katsivelis, Panagiotis Vasilopoulos (Coach: Dušan Ivković)

Runner-up: CSKA Moscow (Russia) Andrei Kirilenko, Miloš Teodosić, Ramūnas Šiškauskas, Nenad Krstić, Jamont Gordon, Darjuš Lavrinovič, Viktor Khryapa, Alexei Shved, Sasha Kaun, Andrei Vorontsevich, Evgeny Voronov, Anton Ponkrashov, Nikita Kurbanov, Sammy Mejia, Dmitri Sokolov (Coach: Jonas Kazlauskas)

Third: FC Barcelona Regal (Spain) Juan Carlos Navarro, Marcelinho Huertas, Chuck Eidson, Erazem Lorbek, Pete Mickeal, Boniface N'Dong, Kosta Perović, C.J. Wallace, Joe Ingles, Fran Vázquez, Víctor Sada, Xavier Rabaseda, Josep Perez (Coach: Xavi Pascual)

Fourth: Panathinaikos Athens (Greece) Šarūnas Jasikevičius, Dimitris Diamantidis, Mike Batiste, Romain Sato, Steven Smith, David Logan, Aleks Marić, Nick Calathes, Kostas Kaimakoglou, Kostas Tsartsaris, Ian Vougioukas, Stratos Perperoglou, Alexis Kyritsis, Pat Calathes (Coach: Željko Obradović)

Quarterfinalist: Maccabi Tel Aviv (Israel) Sofoklis Schortsanitis, Theodoros Papaloukas, Keith Langford, Devin Smith, Richard Hendrix, Demond Mallet, Shawn James, Jordan Farmar, Jon Scheyer, David Blu, Lior Eliyahu, Tal Burstein, Yogev Ohayon, Guy Pnini

Quarterfinalist: Montepaschi Siena (Italy) Bo McCalebb, David Andersen, David Moss, Igor Rakočević, Shaun Stonerook, Kšyštof Lavrinovič, Nikos Zisis, Bootsy Thornton, Rimantas Kaukėnas, Tomas Ress, Marco Carraretto, Pietro Aradori, Andrea Michelori, Luca Lechthaler, DaJuan Summers

Quarterfinalist: UNICS Kazan (Russia) Henry Domercant, Lynn Greer, Terrell Lyday, Kelly McCarty, Mike Wilkinson, Boštjan Nachbar, Nathan Jawai, Alexei Savrasenko, Vladimir Veremeenko, Petr Samoylenko, Zakhar Pashutin, Petr Gubanov, Dimitri Golovin, Igor Zamanskiy

Quarterfinalist: Gescrap Bizkaia Bilbao Basket (Spain) Aaron Jackson, D'or Fischer, Marko Banić, Jānis Blūms, Josh Fisher, Axel Hervelle, Álex Mumbrú, Raúl López, Kostas Vasileiadis, Dimitris Mavroeidis, Roger Grimau, Tomas Hampl, Damir Krupalija, Oliver Stević, Mamadou Samb

EUROCUP BASKETBALL

Winner: Khimki Moscow Region (Russia) Zoran Planinić, Thomas Kelati, Krešimir Lončar, Matt Nielsen, Chris Quinn, Sergei Monia, Vitaly Fridzon, Mickaël Gelabale, Egor Vyaltsev, Alexey Zhukanenko, Anton Pushkov, Dmitry Khvostov, Timofey Mozgov, Benjamin-Pavel Dudu, Austin Daye (Coach: Rimas Kurtinaitis)

Runner-up: Valencia Basket (Spain) Nik Caner-Medley, Serhiy Lishchuk, Florent Piétrus, Stefan Marković, Víctor Claver, Brad Newley, Nando de Colo, Rafa Martínez, Vítor Faverani, Rodrigo San Miguel, Rihards Kuksiks, Andrew Ogilvy, Larry Abia, Alberto Perez, Tiago Splitter, Žarko Rakočević (Coach: Paco Olmos / Chechu Mulero / Velimir Perasović)

Third: Lietuvos Rytas Vilnius (Lithuania) Renaldas Seibutis, Jonas Valančiūnas, Lawrence Roberts, Aleksandar Rašić, Tyrese Rice, Artūras Jomantas, Mindaugas Katelynas, Predrag Samardžiski, Steponas Babrauskas, Dovydas Redikas, Paulius Dambrauskas, Vilmantas Dilys (Coach: Aleksandar Džikić)

Fourth: Spartak Saint Petersburg (Russia) Patrick Beverley, Yotam Halperin, Vladimir Dragičević, Loukas Mavrokefalides, Valeri Likhodey, Victor Keyru, Alexei Zozulin, Miha Zupan, Anatoli Kashirov, Jānis Strēlnieks, Vasili Zavoruev, Aleksei Kotishevskiy, Pavel Sergeev, Nikola Dragović, Pavel Antipov (Coach: Jure Zdovc)

FIBA EUROCHALLENGE

Winner: Beşiktaş Milangaz İstanbul (Turkey) Carlos Arroyo, Pops Mensah-Bonsu, David Hawkins, Zoran Erceg, Marcelus Kemp, Erwin Dudley, Serhat Çetin, Can Akın, Barış Hersek, Mehmet Yağmur, Adem Ören, Adam Morrison, Deron Williams, Semih Erden, Kartal Özmızrak, Mehmet Ali Yatağan (Coach: Ergin Ataman)

Runner-up: Élan Chalon (France) Blake Schilb, Malcolm Delaney, Abdul Aminu, Ilian Evtimov, Steed Tchicamboud, Nicolas Lang, Michel Jean-Baptiste-Adolphe, Bryant Smith, Joffrey Lauvergne, Jordan Aboudou, Ulysse Adjagba (Coach: Grégor Beugnot)

Third: Triumph Lyubertsy Moscow Region (Russia) Jerry Jefferson, Tywain McKee, Kyle Landry, Sergei Karasev, Artem Kuzyakin, Dimitri Kulagin, Victor Zvarykin, Evgeni Valiev, Daniil Solovev, Grigori Andreev, Artem Vikhrov, Alexei Kurtsevich, Ivan Lazarev, Pavel Spiridonov, Lazar Trifunović (Coach: Vasily Karasev)

Fourth: Szolnoki Olaj (Hungary) Obie Trotter, Márton Báder, Julien Mills, Akos Horvath, Hristo Nikolov, Brandon Gay, Márton Fodor, Péter Grebenár, Zoltán Trepák, Gábor Soós, Marko Đerasimović, Mujo Tuljković (Coach: Péter Pór)

== 2012–13 ==
EUROLEAGUE

Winner: Olympiacos Piraeus (Greece) Vassilis Spanoulis, Kyle Hines, Acie Law, Pero Antić, Josh Powell, Giorgi Shermadini, Kostas Papanikolaou, Georgios Printezis, Evangelos Mantzaris, Kostas Sloukas, Stratos Perperoglou, Martynas Gecevičius, Dimitris Mavroeidis, Dimitris Katsivelis, Doron Perkins (Coach: Georgios Bartzokas)

Runner-up: Real Madrid (Spain) Rudy Fernández, Jaycee Carroll, Mirza Begić, Nikola Mirotić, Sergio Llull, Sergio Rodríguez, Carlos Suárez, Dontaye Draper, Marcus Slaughter, Martynas Pocius, Felipe Reyes, Rafael Hettsheimeir, Willy Hernangómez (Coach: Pablo Laso)

Third: CSKA Moscow (Russia) Miloš Teodosić, Nenad Krstić, Victor Khryapa, Sonny Weems, Aaron Jackson, Sasha Kaun, Vladimir Micov, Zoran Erceg, Theodoros Papaloukas, Andrei Vorontsevich, Anton Ponkrashov, Dionte Christmas, Dmitri Sokolov, Aleksei Zozulin, Evgeny Voronov, Alexander Gudumak (Coach: Ettore Messina)

Fourth: FC Barcelona Regal (Spain) Juan Carlos Navarro, Ante Tomić, Marcelinho Huertas, Erazem Lorbek, Šarūnas Jasikevičius, Nate Jawai, Pete Mickeal, Joe Ingles, C.J. Wallace, Víctor Sada, Marko Todorović, Xavier Rabaseda, Álex Abrines, Mario Hezonja, Papa M'Baye (Coach: Xavi Pascual)

Quarterfinalist: Panathinaikos Athens (Greece) Dimitris Diamantidis, Roko Ukić, Stéphane Lasme, Jonas Mačiulis, Sofoklis Schortsanitis, James Gist, Michael Bramos, Marcus Banks, Kostas Tsartsaris, Vassilis Xanthopoulos, Gaios Skordilis, Jason Kapono, Charis Giannopoulos, Andy Panko, Derwin Kitchen, Hilton Armstrong

Quarterfinalist: Anadolu Efes Istanbul (Turkey) Jordan Farmar, Jamon Gordon, Sasha Vujačić, Duško Savanović, Joshua Shipp, Stanko Barać, Semih Erden, Kerem Gönlüm, Kerem Tunçeri, Sinan Güler, Ermal Kuqo, Doğuş Balbay, Birkan Batuk, Esteban Batista

Quarterfinalist: Maccabi Tel Aviv (Israel) Ricky Hickman, Shawn James, Devin Smith, Nik Caner-Medley, David Logan, Yogev Ohayon, Lior Eliyahu, Sylven Landesberg, Darko Planinić, Guy Pnini, Malcolm Thomas, Moran Roth, Itay Segev

Quarterfinalist: Caja Laboral Vitoria (Spain) Andrés Nocioni, Maciej Lampe, Omar Cook, Fernando San Emeterio, Milko Bjelica, Nemanja Bjelica, Tibor Pleiss, Thomas Heurtel, Fabien Causeur, Brad Oleson, Carlos Cabezas, David Jelínek, Unai Calbarro, Taylor Rochestie, Eduardo Hernández-Sonseca

EUROCUP BASKETBALL

Winner: Lokomotiv Kuban Krasnodar (Russia) Nick Calathes, Derrick Brown, Richard Hendrix, Aleks Marić, Simas Jasaitis, Mantas Kalnietis, Jimmy Baron, Alexei Savrasenko, Sergei Bykov, Andrei Zubkov, Maxim Sheleketo, Maxim Grigoryev, Valery Likhodey, Nikita Shabalkin, Maxim Kolyushkin (Coach: Evgeniy Pashutin)

Runner-up: Uxúe Bilbao Basket (Spain) Kostas Vasileiadis, Lamont Hamilton, Nikos Zisis, Raúl López, Álex Mumbrú, Axel Hervelle, Milovan Raković, Roger Grimau, Adrien Moerman, Fran Pilepić, Mamadou Samb, Sergio Sanchez Perez (Coach: Fotis Katsikaris)

Semifinalist: Valencia Basket (Spain) Justin Doellman, Bojan Dubljević, Thomas Kelati, Stefan Marković, Serhiy Lishchuk, Florent Piétrus, Pau Ribas, Rafa Martínez, Rodrigo San Miguel, Vítor Faverani, Larry Abia, Marko Kešelj, Chris Quinn, Luis Sabater, Joffrey Lauvergne, Mickaël Gelabale (Coach: Velimir Perasović)

Semifinalist: Budivelnyk Kyiv (Ukraine) Malcolm Delaney, Artur Drozdov, Leo Lyons, Giorgi Tsintsadze, Dainius Šalenga, Kostiantyn Anikiienko, Michailis Anisimov, Sergiy Gorbenko, Igor Krivtsov, Viktor Herasymchuk, Volodymyr Iegorov, Rihards Kuksiks, Frank Robinson, Pavlo Burenko (Coach: Ainars Bagatskis)

FIBA EUROCHALLENGE

Winner: Krasnye Krylya Samara (Russia) Chester "Tre" Simmons, Omar Thomas, Andre Smith, Aaron Miles, Lamayn Wilson, DeJuan Collins, Nikita Balashov, Evgeni Kolesnikov, Yuri Vasiliev, Dimitri Kulagin, Viktor Zaryazhko, Anton Pushkov, Alexei Fedorchuk, Jeremiah Massey, Tautvydas Lydeka, Rolandas Alijevas, Vitali Zuev (Coach: Sergei Bazarevich)

Runner-up: Pınar Karşıyaka İzmir (Turkey) Bobby Dixon, William Thomas, Abdul Aminu, Jon Diebler, Melvin Sanders, Ümit Sonkol, Evren Büker, Caner Topaloğlu, Soner Şentürk, Bora Hun Paçun, Can Maxim Mutaf, Serkan Menteşe, Ayhan Onur Kentli, Onur Çalban, Mert Celep (Coach: Ufuk Sarıca)

Third: EWE Baskets Oldenburg (Germany) Julius Jenkins, Rickey Paulding, Adam Chubb, Chris Kramer, Dru Joyce, Robin Smeulders, Ronnie Burrell, Konrad Wysocki, Dominik Bahiense de Mello, Jannik Freese, Kevin Smit, Anselm Hartmann (Coach: Sebastian Machowski)

Fourth: BCM Gravelines-Dunkerque (France) Dwight Buycks, Ludovic Vaty, Yannick Bokolo, Kennedy Winston, Abdoulaye M'Baye, Julius Johnson, Cyril Akpomedah, Juan-Khalif Edwards, Sarra Camara, David Noel, Aldo Curti, Abdoulaye Loum, Mathieu Wojciechowski, Jimmy Djimrabaye (Coach: Christian Monschau)

== 2013–14 ==
EUROLEAGUE

Winner: Maccabi Tel Aviv (Israel) Ricky Hickman, Tyrese Rice, Devin Smith, Alex Tyus, David Blu, Sofoklis Schortsanitis, Joe Ingles, Andrija Žižić, Shawn James, Yogev Ohayon, Guy Pnini, Sylven Landesberg, Ben Altit, Arad Harari, Jake Cohen (Coach: David Blatt)

Runner-up: Real Madrid (Spain) Rudy Fernández, Sergio Rodríguez, Nikola Mirotić, Tremmell Darden, Ioannis Bourousis, Jaycee Carroll, Sergio Llull, Marcus Slaughter, Felipe Reyes, Salah Mejri, Dontaye Draper, Daniel Díez, Alberto Martín, Jonathan Barreiro (Coach: Pablo Laso)

Third: FC Barcelona (Spain) Juan Carlos Navarro, Ante Tomić, Marcelinho Huertas, Joey Dorsey, Kostas Papanikolaou, Erazem Lorbek, Boštjan Nachbar, Maciej Lampe, Brad Oleson, Álex Abrines, Jacob Pullen, Víctor Sada, Mario Hezonja, Marko Todorović (Coach: Xavi Pascual)

Fourth: CSKA Moscow (Russia) Miloš Teodosić, Nenad Krstić, Sonny Weems, Victor Khryapa, Kyle Hines, Jeremy Pargo, Aaron Jackson, Sasha Kaun, Vladimir Micov, Vitaly Fridzon, Andrey Vorontsevich, Aleksei Zozulin, Grigory Shukhovtcov (Coach: Ettore Messina)

Quarterfinalist: Olympiacos Piraeus (Greece) Vassilis Spanoulis, Bryant Dunston, Matt Lojeski, Brent Petway, Cedric Simmons, Mardy Collins, Giorgi Shermadini, Mirza Begić, Georgios Printezis, Evangelos Mantzaris, Stratos Perperoglou, Kostas Sloukas, Ioannis Papapetrou, Dimitris Katsivelis, Dimitris Agravanis, Vasileios Kavvadas, Acie Law, Jamario Moon

Quarterfinalist: Panathinaikos Athens (Greece) Dimitris Diamantidis, Stéphane Lasme, Roko Ukić, Jonas Mačiulis, Antonis Fotsis, James Gist, Michael Bramos, Ramel Curry, Zackary Wright, Mike Batiste, Loukas Mavrokefalidis, Vlado Janković, Nikos Pappas, Georgios Apostolidis, Vasileios Charalampopoulos

Quarterfinalist: Olimpia EA7 Emporio Armani Milano (Italy) Keith Langford, Daniel Hackett, Curtis Jerrells, David Moss, Alessandro Gentile, Samardo Samuels, Nicolò Melli, C.J. Wallace, Gani Lawal, Kristjan Kangur, Bruno Cerella, Marquez Haynes, David Chiotti, Mohamed Toure

Quarterfinalist: Galatasaray Liv Hospital İstanbul (Turkey) Carlos Arroyo, Malik Hairston, Pops Mensah-Bonsu, Zoran Erceg, Henry Domercant, Milan Mačvan, Manuchar Markoishvili, Erwin Dudley, Furkan Aldemir, Ender Arslan, Cenk Akyol, Sinan Güler, Göksenin Köksal, Engin Atsür, Jamont Gordon, Nate Jawai, Doğukan Sönmez

EUROCUP BASKETBALL

Winner: Valencia Basket (Spain) Justin Doellman, Bojan Dubljević, Romain Sato, Sam van Rossom, Oliver Lafayette, Rafa Martínez, Pau Ribas, Juan Jose Triguero, Serhiy Lishchuk, Vladimir Lučić, Pablo Aguilar, Larry Abia, Luboš Bartoň, Luis Sabater, Pablo Pérez, Oleksiy Pecherov, David Guardia (Coach: Velimir Perasović)

Runner-up: UNICS Kazan (Russia) Andrew Goudelock, Chuck Eidson, Nikos Zisis, Luke Harangody, Tywain McKee, Kostas Kaimakoglou, Ian Vougioukas, Nikita Kurbanov, Vladimir Veremeenko, Dmitri Sokolov, Pavel Sergeev, Pavel Antipov, Evgeni Kolesnikov, Maxim Sheleketo (Coach: Andrea Trinchieri)

Semifinalist: Crvena Zvezda Telekom Belgrade (Serbia) DeMarcus Nelson, Charles Jenkins, Jaka Blažič, Boban Marjanović, Tadija Dragićević, Ivan Radenović, Raško Katić, Marko Simonović, Branko Lazić, Luka Mitrović, Marko Tejić, Nikola Rebić, Blake Schilb (Coach: Dejan Radonjić)

Semifinalist: Nizhny Novgorod (Russia) Dijon Thompson, Taylor Rochestie, Primož Brezec, Vadim Panin, Semen Antonov, Dmitry Khvostov, Pavel Korobkov, Evgeni Baburin, Vladimir Ivlev, Brandon Paul, Luke Babbitt, Ivan Savelyev, Petr Gubanov, Dimitri Golovin, Andrei Kirdiachkin (Coach: Zoran Lukić)

FIBA EUROCHALLENGE

Winner: Grissin Bon Reggio Emilia (Italy) James White, Rimantas Kaukėnas, Andrea Cinciarini, Ojārs Siliņš, Troy Bell, Greg Brunner, Angelo Gigli, Ariel Filloy, Riccardo Cervi, Michele Antonutti, Matteo Frassineti, Giovanni Pini, Federico Mussini, Coby Karl (Coach: Massimiliano "Max" Menetti)

Runner-up: Triumph Lyubertsy Moscow Region (Russia) Cory Higgins, Kyle Landry, Milovan Raković, Jeremy Chappell, Dimitri Kulagin, Artem Vikhrov, Evgeni Valiev, Evgeny Voronov, Pavel Spiridonov, Ivan Lazarev, Viktor Zaryazhko, Artem Kuzyakin, Mikhail Kulagin, Alexei Kurtsevich (Coach: Vasily Karasev)

Third: Royal Halı Gaziantep (Turkey) J. R. Bremer, Dejan Borovnjak, Domen Lorbek, Oliver Stević, Mikko Koivisto, Barış Ermiş, Mutlu Akpınar, Can Uğur Öğüt, Murat Göktaş, Sertaç Şanlı, Serhat Büker, Erden Eryüz, Serkan Erdoğan, Engin Emre Bayav, Terrico White, Stanley Burell, Aliaksandr Kudrautsau (Coach: Jure Zdovc)

Fourth: Szolnoki Olaj (Hungary) Justin Holiday, Péter Lóránt, Dávid Vojvoda, Strahinja Milošević, Márton Báder, Willie Warren, Balázs Simon, Obie Trotter, Ákos Keller, Radenko Pilčević, Miljan Rakić, Tamás Ivosev, Zoltán Tóth, Chris Oliver, Ákos Horváth, Luka Marković (Coach: Dragan Aleksić)

== 2014–15 ==
EUROLEAGUE

Winner: Real Madrid (Spain) Rudy Fernández, Sergio Rodríguez, Sergio Llull, Andrés Nocioni, Jaycee Carroll, Felipe Reyes, Gustavo Ayón, K. C. Rivers, Jonas Mačiulis, Ioannis Bourousis, Marcus Slaughter, Salah Mejri, Facundo Campazzo (Coach: Pablo Laso)

Runner-up: Olympiacos Piraeus (Greece) Vassilis Spanoulis, Bryant Dunston, Georgios Printezis, Matt Lojeski, Othello Hunter, Tremmell Darden, Oliver Lafayette, Brent Petway, Vangelis Mantzaris, Kostas Sloukas, Dimitrios Agravanis, Ioannis Papapetrou, Dimitrios Katsivelis, Vasileios Kavvadas, Michalis Tsairelis, Antreas Christodoulou (Coach: Milan Tomić / Giannis Sfairopoulos)

Third: CSKA Moscow (Russia) Miloš Teodosić, Nando de Colo, Andrei Kirilenko, Sonny Weems, Sasha Kaun, Aaron Jackson, Andrey Vorontsevich, Kyle Hines, Manuchar Markoishvili, Demetris Nichols, Victor Khryapa, Vitaly Fridzon, Pavel Korobkov, Aleksei Zozulin, Ivan Strebkov, Anton Astapkovich (Coach: Dimitris Itoudis)

Fourth: Fenerbahçe Ülker İstanbul (Turkey) Nemanja Bjelica, Andrew Goudelock, Jan Veselý, Bogdan Bogdanović, Ricky Hickman, Nikos Zisis, Luka Žorić, Emir Preldžić, Semih Erden, Oğuz Savaş, Kenan Sipahi, Melih Mahmutoğlu, Serhat Çetin, Ömer Yurtseven, Berk Uğurlu, Can Altıntığ, İzzet Türkyılmaz (Coach: Željko Obradović)

Quarterfinalist: FC Barcelona (Spain) Juan Carlos Navarro, Ante Tomić, Justin Doellman, Marcelinho Huertas, Tomáš Satoranský, Deshaun Thomas, Brad Oleson, Boštjan Nachbar, Tibor Pleiß, Maciej Lampe, Edwin Jackson, Álex Abrines, Mario Hezonja, Ludde Håkanson, Emir Sulejmanović

Quarterfinalist: Maccabi Tel Aviv (Israel) Devin Smith, Jeremy Pargo, Brian Randle, Alex Tyus, MarQuez Haynes, Yogev Ohayon, Sofoklis Schortsanitis, Nate Linhart, Sylven Landesberg, Joe Alexander, Jake Cohen, Joseph Forte, Aleks Marić, Guy Pnini, Arad Harari, Ben Altit

Quarterfinalist: Panathinaikos Athens (Greece) Dimitris Diamantidis, Esteban Batista, James Gist, A. J. Slaughter, DeMarcus Nelson, Antonis Fotsis, Vlado Janković, Nikos Pappas, Jānis Blūms, Loukas Mavrokefalidis, Eleftherios Bochoridis, Vasileios Charalampopoulos, Gani Lawal, Julian Wright, Michalis Lountzis, Georgios Diamantakos, Antonios Koniaris

Quarterfinalist: Anadolu Efes İstanbul (Turkey) Nenad Krstić, Thomas Heurtel, Dario Šarić, Matt Janning, Stéphane Lasme, Dontaye Draper, Stratos Perperoglou, Milko Bjelica, Cedi Osman, Doğuş Balbay, Furkan Korkmaz, Birkan Batuk, Deniz Kılıçlı, Emircan Koşut, Okben Ulubay, Donnie McGrath

EUROCUP BASKETBALL

Winner: Khimki Moscow Region (Russia) Tyrese Rice, Petteri Koponen, James Augustine, Paul Davis, Tyler Honeycutt, Marko Popović, Sergei Monia, Egor Vyaltsev, Ruslan Pateev, Stanislav Ilnitskiy, Maxim Sheleketo, Joffrey Lauvergne, Maxim Sakharov, Nikita Ivanov (Coach: Rimas Kurtinaitis)

Runner-up: Herbalife Gran Canaria Las Palmas (Spain) Walter Tavares, Kyle Kuric, Brad Newley, Eulis Báez, Levon Kendall, Tomás Bellas, Txemi Urtasun, Ian O'Leary, Albert Oliver, Oriol Paulí, Joaquín Portugués, DaJuan Summers, Mouhamed Barro, Óscar Alvarado, Fabio Santana (Coach: Aíto García Reneses)

Semifinalist: UNICS Kazan (Russia) Keith Langford, James White, D'or Fischer, Curtis Jerrells, Kostas Kaimakoglou, Sergei Bykov, Pavel Antipov, Dmitri Sokolov, Valery Likhodey, Vadim Panin, Rolands Freimanis, Petr Gubanov, Anton Ponkrashov, Viktor Sanikidze (Coach: Evgeniy Pashutin)

Semifinalist: Banvit Bandırma (Turkey) Sammy Mejía, Earl "E.J." Rowland, Chuck Davis, Keith Simmons, Vladimir Dragičević, Vladimir Veremeenko, Jimmy Baron, Şafak Edge, Can Maxim Mutaf, Berkay Candan, Tolga Geçim, İsmail Cem Ulusoy, Erkan Veyseloğlu, Cevher Özer (Coach: Zoran Lukić / Selçuk Ernak)

FIBA EUROCHALLENGE

Winner: JSF Nanterre (France) Kyle Weems, Jamal Shuler, Terrance "T.J." Campbell, Mykal Riley, Mouhammadou Jaiteh, Jérémy Nzeulie, Laurence Ekperigin, Johan Passave-Ducteil, Joseph Gomis, Marc Judith, William Mensah, Keydren Clark (Coach: Pascal Donnadieu)

Runner-up: Trabzonspor Medical Park (Turkey) Dwight Hardy, Andrija Stipanović, Sean Marshall, Novica Veličković, Demarquis "Dee" Bost, Kaloyan Ivanov, Can Altıntığ, Nusret Yıldırım, Alper Saruhan, Yunus Akçay, Can Korkmaz, Hasan Yiğit Seçkin, Mustafa Baştürk, Caner Şentürk, Gani Lawal (Coach: Nenad Marković)

== 2015–16 ==
EUROLEAGUE

Winner: CSKA Moscow (Russia) Nando de Colo, Miloš Teodosić, Kyle Hines, Cory Higgins, Andrey Vorontsevich, Nikita Kurbanov, Aaron Jackson, Victor Khryapa, Demetris Nichols, Joel Freeland, Vitaly Fridzon, Pavel Korobkov, Dmitry Kulagin, Ivan Lazarev, Viacheslav Kravtsov, Mikhail Kulagin (Coach: Dimitris Itoudis)

Runner-up: Fenerbahçe İstanbul (Turkey) Jan Veselý, Ekpe Udoh, Luigi Datome, Bogdan Bogdanović, Bobby Dixon, Pero Antić, Kostas Sloukas, Nikola Kalinić, Ricky Hickman, Melih Mahmutoğlu, Barış Hersek, Berk Uğurlu, Egehan Arna, Ömer Faruk Yurtseven, Ercan Bayrak (Coach: Željko Obradović)

Third: Lokomotiv Kuban Krasnodar (Russia) Malcolm Delaney, Anthony Randolph, Víctor Claver, Chris Singleton, Ryan Broekhoff, Dontaye Draper, Matt Janning, Sergey Bykov, Evgeny Voronov, Andrey Zubkov, Kyrylo Fesenko, Maxim Kolyushkin, Nikita Balashov, Aleksey Zozulin, Igor Kanygin (Coach: Georgios Bartzokas)

Fourth: Laboral Kutxa Vitoria Gasteiz (Spain) Ioannis Bourousis, Darius Adams, Mike James, Ádám Hanga, Fabien Causeur, Kim Tillie, Dāvis Bertāns, Jaka Blažič, Darko Planinić, Ilimane Diop, Alberto Corbacho, Tornike Shengelia, Mamadou Diop (Coach: Velimir Perasović)

Quarterfinalist: Real Madrid (Spain) Rudy Fernández, Sergio Rodríguez, Sergio Llull, Gustavo Ayón, Jaycee Carroll, Jonas Mačiulis, Felipe Reyes, K. C. Rivers, Andrés Nocioni, Jeffery Taylor, Trey Thompkins, Luka Dončić, Willy Hernangómez, Augusto Lima, Maurice Ndour, Dino Radončić

Quarterfinalist: Panathinaikos Athens (Greece) Nick Calathes, Dimitris Diamantidis, Miroslav Raduljica, James Gist, Elliot Williams, James Feldeine, Sasha Pavlović, MarQuez Haynes, Vladimir Janković, Ognjen Kuzmić, Antonis Fotsis, Vince Hunter, Nikos Pappas, Georgios Papagiannis, Vasilis Charalampopoulos, Eleftherios Bochoridis, Michalis Lountzis

Quarterfinalist: FC Barcelona Lassa (Spain) Juan Carlos Navarro, Ante Tomić, Justin Doellman, Tomáš Satoranský, Stratos Perperoglou, Álex Abrines, Carlos Arroyo, Samardo Samuels, Joey Dorsey, Pau Ribas, Brad Oleson, Shane Lawal, Aleksandar Vezenkov, Moussa Diagne, Marcus Eriksson

Quarterfinalist: Crvena Zvezda Telekom Belgrade (Serbia) Quincy Miller, Maik Zirbes, Tarence Kinsey, Stefan Jović, Marko Simonović, Branko Lazić, Vasilije Micić, Vladimir Štimac, Nemanja Dangubić, Marko Gudurić, Nikola Rebić, Marko Tejić, Luka Mitrović, Boriša Simanić, Stefan Nastić, Ryan Thompson

EUROCUP BASKETBALL

Winner: Galatasaray Odeabank İstanbul (Turkey) Errick McCollum, Stéphane Lasme, Vladimir Micov, Blake Schilb, Chuck Davis, Caleb Green, Curtis Jerrells, Sinan Güler, Göksenin Köksal, Şafak Edge, Ege Arar, Dusan Cantekin, Doğukan Şanlı, İzzet Türkyılmaz (Coach: Ergin Ataman)

Runner-up: Strasbourg IG (France) Mardy Collins, Kyle Weems, Rodrigue Beaubois, Louis Campbell, Matt Howard, Jérémy Leloup, Bangaly Fofana, Paul Lacombe, Romain Duport, Frank Ntilikina (Coach: Vincent Collet)

Semifinalist: Herbalife Gran Canaria Las Palmas (Spain) Alen Omić, Kevin Pangos, Sasu Salin, Brad Newley, D. J. Seeley, Eulis Báez, Pablo Aguilar, Albert Oliver, Xavi Rabaseda, Sitapha Savané, Anžejs Pasečņiks, Oriol Paulí, Ovidijus Galdikas, Kyle Kuric (Coach: Aíto García Reneses)

Semifinalist: Dolomiti Energia Trento (Italy) Davide Pascolo, Julian Wright, Trent Lockett, Dominique Sutton, Jamarr Sanders, Andrés Forray, Giuseppe Poeta, Diego Flaccadori, Filippo Baldi Rossi, Luca Lechthaler, Johan Löfberg (Coach: Maurizio Buscaglia)

FIBA EUROPE CUP

Winner: Fraport Skyliners Frankfurt (Germany) Jordan Theodore, Quantez Robertson, Johannes Voigtmann, Philip Scrubb, Aaron Doornekamp, Danilo Barthel, Mike Morrison, John Little, Konstantin Klein, Johannes Richter, Max Merz, Stefan Ilzhöfer, Tomas Dimša, Tim Oldenburg, Garai Zeeb (Coach: Gordon Herbert)

Runner-up: Openjobmetis Varese (Italy) Chris Wright, Brandon Davies, Maalik Wayns, Rihards Kuksiks, Kristjan Kangur, Luca Campani, Daniele Cavaliero, Giancarlo Ferrero, Mouhammad Faye, Ovidijus Varanauskas, Lorenzo Molinaro, Manuel Rossi, Umberto Pietrini, Filippo Testa, Jacopo Lepri, Ramon Galloway, Mychel Thompson, Jevohn Shepherd (Coach: Paolo Moretti)

== 2016–17 ==
EUROLEAGUE

Winner: Fenerbahçe İstanbul (Turkey) Ekpe Udoh, Bogdan Bogdanović, Jan Veselý, Ali Muhammed, Luigi Datome, Kostas Sloukas, Nikola Kalinić, James Nunnally, Pero Antić, Anthony Bennett, Melih Mahmutoğlu, Ahmet Düverioğlu, Berk Uğurlu, Barış Hersek, Egehan Arna, Yordan Minchev (Coach: Željko Obradović)

Runner-up: Olympiacos Piraeus (Greece) Vassilis Spanoulis, Georgios Printezis, Erick Green, Matt Lojeski, Kostas Papanikolaou, Vangelis Mantzaris, Khem Birch, Nikola Milutinov, Daniel Hackett, Patric Young, Dominic Waters, Ioannis Papapetrou, Dimitris Agravanis, Ioannis Athinaiou, Vassilis Toliopoulos (Coach: Ioannis Sfairopoulos)

Third: CSKA Moscow (Russia) Nando de Colo, Miloš Teodosić, Kyle Hines, Cory Higgins, Aaron Jackson, Nikita Kurbanov, Andrey Vorontsevich, James Augustine, Victor Khryapa, Vitaly Fridzon, Joel Freeland, Dmitry Kulagin, Semen Antonov, Mikhail Kulagin, Jeff Ayres (Coach: Dimitris Itoudis)

Fourth: Real Madrid (Spain) Sergio Llull, Rudy Fernández, Gustavo Ayón, Anthony Randolph, Luka Dončić, Jaycee Carroll, Othello Hunter, Jonas Mačiulis, Jeffery Taylor, Trey Thompkins, Dontaye Draper, Felipe Reyes, Andrés Nocioni (Coach: Pablo Laso)

Quarterfinalist: Panathinaikos Superfoods Athens (Greece) Nick Calathes, Chris Singleton, Mike James, K. C. Rivers, James Gist, James Feldeine, Ioannis Bourousis, Kenny Gabriel, Demetris Nichols, Nikos Pappas, Antonis Fotsis, Alessandro Gentile, Vasilis Charalampopoulos, Eleftherios Bochoridis

Quarterfinalist: Anadolu Efes İstanbul (Turkey) Thomas Heurtel, Bryant Dunston, Derrick Brown, Jayson Granger, Tyler Honeycutt, Cedi Osman, Brandon Paul, Deshaun Thomas, Alex Kirk, Doğuş Balbay, Bryce Cotton, Maxim Mutaf, Furkan Korkmaz

Quarterfinalist: Baskonia Vitoria Gasteiz (Spain) Shane Larkin, Ádám Hanga, Johannes Voigtmann, Tornike Shengelia, Rodrigue Beaubois, Kim Tillie, Chase Budinger, Jaka Blažič, Ilimane Diop, Andrea Bargnani, Rafa Luz, Nicolás Laprovíttola, Tadas Sedekerskis, Josh Akognon, Pablo Prigioni, Trevor Cooney

Quarterfinalist: Darüşşafaka Doğuş İstanbul (Turkey) Brad Wanamaker, Will Clyburn, Scottie Wilbekin, James Anderson, Adrien Moerman, Ante Žižić, Dairis Bertāns, Marcus Slaughter, Luke Harangody, Birkan Batuk, Furkan Aldemir, Semih Erden, Oğuz Savaş, Mehmet Yağmur, Ender Arslan, Okben Ulubay, Metin Türen

7DAYS EUROCUP

Winner: Unicaja Málaga (Spain) Jeff Brooks, Dejan Musli, Nemanja Nedović, Jamar Smith, Alen Omić, Kyle Fogg, Adam Waczyński, Carlos Suárez, Alberto Diaz, Daniel Diez, Oliver Lafayette, Viny Okouo, Hamady N'Diaye, Juan Jose Garcia (Coach: Joan Plaza)

Runner-up: Valencia Basket (Spain) Bojan Dubljević, Fernando San Emeterio, Luke Sikma, Will Thomas, Joan Sastre, Rafa Martínez, Sam van Rossom, Romain Sato, Antoine Diot, Guillem Vives, Pierre Oriola, Viacheslav Kravtsov, Luis Ferrando, Josep Puerto, Emil Savic, Vladimir Janković (Coach: Pedro Martínez)

== 2017–18 ==
EUROLEAGUE

Winner: Real Madrid (Spain) Luka Dončić, Rudy Fernández, Gustavo Ayón, Facundo Campazzo, Walter Tavares, Anthony Randolph, Jaycee Carroll, Trey Thompkins, Jeffery Taylor, Fabien Causeur, Jonas Mačiulis, Felipe Reyes, Chasson Randle, Santi Yusta, Sergio Llull, Dino Radončić, Ognjen Kuzmić (Coach: Pablo Laso)

Runner-up: Fenerbahçe Doğuş İstanbul (Turkey) Jan Veselý, Brad Wanamaker, Nicolò Melli, Kostas Sloukas, Luigi Datome, Nikola Kalinić, Marko Gudurić, James Nunnally, Ali Muhammed, Jason Thompson, Melih Mahmutoğlu, Ahmet Düverioğlu, Sinan Güler, Barış Hersek, Egehan Arna (Coach: Željko Obradović)

Third: Žalgiris Kaunas (Lithuania) Kevin Pangos, Aaron White, Vasilije Micić, Brandon Davies, Paulius Jankūnas, Edgaras Ulanovas, Artūras Milaknis, Beno Udrih, Axel Toupane, Antanas Kavaliauskas, Paulius Valinskas, Dee Bost, Gytis Masiulis, Martynas Sajus, Martynas Arlauskas (Coach: Šarūnas Jasikevičius)

Fourth: CSKA Moscow (Russia) Nando de Colo, Sergio Rodríguez, Will Clyburn, Cory Higgins, Kyle Hines, Othello Hunter, Léo Westermann, Nikita Kurbanov, Andrey Vorontsevich, Victor Rudd, Semen Antonov, Victor Khryapa, Vitaly Fridzon, Mikhail Kulagin, Pavel Korobkov, Alexander Gankevich, Alan Makiev (Coach: Dimitris Itoudis)

Quarterfinalist: Olympiacos Piraeus (Greece) Vassilis Spanoulis, Georgios Printezis, Nikola Milutinov, Jamel McLean, Brian Roberts, Kostas Papanikolaou, Jānis Strēlnieks, Vangelis Mantzaris, Ioannis Papapetrou, Kim Tillie, Kyle Wiltjer, Hollis Thompson, Bobby Brown, Dimitris Agravanis, Georgios Bogris, Vassilis Toliopoulos

Quarterfinalist: Panathinaikos Superfoods Athens (Greece) Nick Calathes, Chris Singleton, Mike James, James Gist, K. C. Rivers, Matt Lojeski, Kenny Gabriel, Marcus Denmon, Nikos Pappas, Adreian Payne, Lukas Lekavičius, Thanasis Antetokounmpo, Ian Vougioukas, Zach Auguste, Konstantinos Mitoglou, Georgios Kalaitzakis

Quarterfinalist: KIROLBET Baskonia Vitoria Gasteiz (Spain) Tornike Shengelia, Vincent Poirier, Matt Janning, Jayson Granger, Rodrigue Beaubois, Marcelinho Huertas, Johannes Voigtmann, Jānis Timma, Ilimane Diop, Patricio Garino, Luca Vildoza, Rinalds Malmanis, Kevin Jones, Jordan McRae, Carlos Delfino, Miguel González, Ivan Martinez

Quarterfinalist: Khimki Moscow Region (Russia) Alexey Shved, Anthony Gill, Charles Jenkins, James Anderson, Malcolm Thomas, Tyler Honeycutt, Stefan Marković, Thomas Robinson, Sergey Monia, Marko Todorović, Egor Vialtsev, Andrey Zubkov, Vyacheslav Zaytsev, Dmitry Sokolov

7DAYS EUROCUP

Winner: Darüşşafaka İstanbul (Turkey) Scottie Wilbekin, JaJuan Johnson, Howard Sant-Roos, James Bell, Will Cummings, Michael Eric, Stanton Kidd, Furkan Aldemir, Okben Ulubay, Muhammed Baygül, Kartal Özmızrak, Doğuş Özdemiroğlu, Emircan Koşut (Coach: David Blatt)

Runner-up: Lokomotiv Kuban Krasnodar (Russia) Ryan Broekhoff, Joe Ragland, Mardy Collins, Chris Babb, Trevor Lacey, Frank Elegar, Dmitry Kulagin, Brian Qvale, Pavel Antipov, Dmitry Khvostov, Vladimir Ivlev, Stanislav Ilnitskiy, Evgeny Baburin, Ivan Nelyubov, Denis Levshin, Timofei Gerasimov (Coach: Saša Obradović)

== 2018–19 ==
EUROLEAGUE

Winner: CSKA Moscow (Russia) Nando de Colo, Will Clyburn, Cory Higgins, Sergio Rodríguez, Kyle Hines, Othello Hunter, Daniel Hackett, Alec Peters, Joel Bolomboy, Nikita Kurbanov, Andrey Vorontsevich, Semen Antonov, Ivan Ukhov, Mikhail Kulagin, Andrei Lopatin, Alexander Khomenko (Coach: Dimitris Itoudis)

Runner-up: Anadolu Efes İstanbul (Turkey) Shane Larkin, Vasilije Micić, Bryant Dunston, Adrien Moerman, Krunoslav Simon, Rodrigue Beaubois, James Anderson, Tibor Pleiss, Brock Motum, Doğuş Balbay, Sertaç Şanlı, Buğrahan Tuncer, Metecan Birsen (Coach: Ergin Ataman)

Third: Real Madrid (Spain) Sergio Llull, Rudy Fernández, Anthony Randolph, Facundo Campazzo, Walter Tavares, Gustavo Ayón, Jeffery Taylor, Trey Thompkins, Jaycee Carroll, Fabien Causeur, Gabriel Deck, Klemen Prepelič, Felipe Reyes, Santi Yusta, Ognjen Kuzmić, Melwin Pantzar (Coach: Pablo Laso)

Fourth: Fenerbahçe Beko İstanbul (Turkey) Jan Veselý, Kostas Sloukas, Nicolò Melli, Luigi Datome, Nikola Kalinić, Marko Gudurić, Ali Muhammed, Erick Green, Joffrey Lauvergne, Melih Mahmutoğlu, Ahmet Düverioğlu, Sinan Güler, Tarık Biberovic, Egehan Arna, Tyler Ennis, Ergi Tırpancı (Coach: Željko Obradović)

Quarterfinalist: FC Barcelona Lassa (Spain) Thomas Heurtel, Ádám Hanga, Víctor Claver, Chris Singleton, Ante Tomić, Kevin Pangos, Kyle Kuric, Pau Ribas, Pierre Oriola, Kevin Séraphin, Jaka Blažič, Rolands Šmits, Artem Pustovyi

Quarterfinalist: Panathinaikos OPAP Athens (Greece) Nick Calathes, Deshaun Thomas, Keith Langford, Sean Kilpatrick, James Gist, Stéphane Lasme, Matt Lojeski, Ioannis Papapetrou, Nikos Pappas, Georgios Papagiannis, Konstantinos Mitoglou, Lukas Lekavičius, Ian Vougioukas, Thanasis Antetokounmpo, Adreian Payne, Georgios Kalaitzakis

Quarterfinalist: KIROLBET Baskonia Vitoria-Gasteiz (Spain) Tornike Shengelia, Vincent Poirier, Shavon Shields, Matt Janning, Darrun Hilliard, Johannes Voigtmann, Marcelinho Huertas, Luca Vildoza, Patricio Garino, Jayson Granger, Ilimane Diop, Jalen Jones, Miguel González, Ajdin Penava, Tadas Sedekerskis

Quarterfinalist: Žalgiris Kaunas (Lithuania) Brandon Davies, Aaron White, Nate Wolters, Léo Westermann, Edgaras Ulanovas, Artūras Milaknis, Marius Grigonis, Thomas Walkup, Deon Thompson, Derrick Walton Jr., Paulius Jankūnas, Antanas Kavaliauskas, Rokas Jokubaitis, Laurynas Birutis, Lukas Uleckas, Erikas Venskus, Donatas Sabeckis

7DAYS EUROCUP

Winner: Valencia Basket (Spain) Bojan Dubljević, Will Thomas, Sam van Rossom, Matt Thomas, Fernando San Emeterio, Louis Labeyrie, Aaron Doornekamp, Mike Tobey, Antoine Diot, Alberto Abalde, Joan Sastre, Guillem Vives, Rafa Martínez, Sergi García, Jon Galarza (Coach: Jaume Ponsarnau)

Runner-up: ALBA Berlin (Germany) Luke Sikma, Rokas Giedraitis, Peyton Siva, Martin Hermannsson, Niels Giffey, Stefan Peno, Landry Nnoko, Joshiko Saibou, Johannes Thiemann, Dennis Clifford, Tim Schneider, Franz Wagner, Kenneth Ogbe, Clinton Daniel Chapman, Jonas Mattisseck, Bennet Hundt, Krešimir Nikic (Coach: Aíto García Reneses)
