= Wrestling at the 1972 Summer Olympics – Men's Greco-Roman 57 kg =

Men's Greco-Roman 57 kg at the Games of the XX Olympiad
- Venue: Messe München
- Dates: 5–10 September 1972
- Competitors: 29 from 29 nations

Medalists
1st place, gold medalist(s)		Rustam Kazakov	Soviet Union
2nd place, silver medalist(s)		Hans-Jürgen Veil	West Germany
3rd place, bronze medalist(s)		Risto Björlin	Finland

The Men's Greco-Roman 57 kg at the 1972 Summer Olympics as part of the wrestling program at the Fairgrounds, Judo and Wrestling Hall.

== Medalists ==
Gold	Rustam Kazakov; Soviet Union
Silver	Hans-Jürgen Veil; West Germany
Bronze	Risto Björlin; Finland

== Tournament results ==
The competition used a form of negative points tournament, with negative points given for any result short of a fall. Accumulation of 6 negative points eliminated the wrestler. When only two or three wrestlers remain, a special final round is used to determine the order of the medals.

Legend

- DNA — Did not appear
- TPP — Total penalty points
- MPP — Match penalty points

Penalties

- 0 — Won by Fall, Passivity, Injury and Forfeit
- 0.5 — Won by Technical Superiority
- 1 — Won by Points
- 2 — Draw
- 2.5 — Draw, Passivity
- 3 — Lost by Points
- 3.5 — Lost by Technical Superiority
- 4 — Lost by Fall, Passivity, Injury and Forfeit

=== Round 1 ===
TPP	MPP		Time		MPP	TPP
1	1	Luís Grilo (POR)		Eduardo Maggiolo (ARG)	3	3
4	4	Juan Velarde (PER)	1:51	Hans-Jürgen Veil (FRG)	0	0
0	0	Per Lindholm (SWE)	6:44	Alfredo López (MEX)	4	4
0	0	Ion Baciu (ROU)	2:06	Rogelio Famatid (PHI)	4	4
0	0	Ikuei Yamamoto (JPN)	2:59	Firouz Alizadeh (IRI)	4	4
3	3	Karlo Čović (YUG)		Hristo Traikov (BUL)	1	1
3.5	3.5	Alam Mir (AFG)		Rustam Kazakov (URS)	0.5	0.5
3	3	Francesco Scuderi (ITA)		Józef Lipień (POL)	1	1
3	3	Ernst Hack (AUT)		Chimedbazaryn Damdinsharav (MGL)	1	1
4	4	Ibrahim Ibrahim Sayed (EGY)	0:00	Othon Moschidis (GRE)	0	0
4	4	Jan Neckář (TCH)	8:46	Wolfgang Radmacher (GDR)	4	4
2	2	Ali Lachkar (MAR)		Fawzi Salloum (SYR)	2	2
0	0	Risto Björlin (FIN)	2:48	Jørn Krogsgaard (DEN)	4	4
3	3	David Hazewinkel (USA)		An Chun-Young (KOR)	1	1
4	4	Harald Hervig (NOR)	0:53	János Varga (HUN)	0	0

=== Round 2 ===
TPP	MPP		Time		MPP	TPP
1	0	Luís Grilo (POR)	7:17	Juan Velarde (PER)	4	8
7	4	Eduardo Maggiolo (ARG)	4:38	Hans-Jürgen Veil (FRG)	0	0
3	3	Per Lindholm (SWE)		Ion Baciu (ROU)	1	1
8	4	Rogelio Famatid (PHI)	1:43	Ikuei Yamamoto (JPN)	0	0
3	0	Karlo Čović (YUG)	8:09	Alam Mir (AFG)	4	7.5
2	1	Hristo Traikov (BUL)		Rustam Kazakov (URS)	3	3.5
4	1	Francesco Scuderi (ITA)		Ernst Hack (AUT)	3	6
1	0	Józef Lipień (POL)	1:17	Chimedbazaryn Damdinsharav (MGL)	4	5
3	3	Othon Moschidis (GRE)		Jan Neckář (TCH)	1	5
7	3	Wolfgang Radmacher (GDR)		Ali Lachkar (MAR)	1	3
1	1	Risto Björlin (FIN)		David Hazewinkel (USA)	3	6
8	4	Jørn Krogsgaard (DEN)	2:23	Harald Hervig (NOR)	0	4
5	4	An Chun-Young (KOR)	0:00	János Varga (HUN)	0	0
4		Alfredo López (MEX)		DNA		
4		Firouz Alizadeh (IRI)		DNA		
4		Ibrahim Ibrahim Sayed (EGY)		DNA		
2		Fawzi Salloum (SYR)		DNA		

=== Round 3 ===
TPP	MPP		Time		MPP	TPP
5	4	Luís Grilo (POR)	2:31	Hans-Jürgen Veil (FRG)	0	0
5.5	2.5	Per Lindholm (SWE)		Ikuei Yamamoto (JPN)	2.5	2.5
2	1	Ion Baciu (ROU)		Karlo Čović (YUG)	3	6
3	1	Hristo Traikov (BUL)		Francesco Scuderi (ITA)	3	7
3.5	0	Rustam Kazakov (URS)	8:39	Józef Lipień (POL)	4	5
7.5	2.5	Chimedbazaryn Damdinsharav (MGL)		Othon Moschidis (GRE)	2.5	5.5
5.5	0.5	Jan Neckář (TCH)		Ali Lachkar (MAR)	3.5	6.5
2	1	Risto Björlin (FIN)		An Chun-Young (KOR)	3	8
0		János Varga (HUN)		Bye		
4		Harald Hervig (NOR)		DNA		

=== Round 4 ===
TPP	MPP		Time		MPP	TPP
0.5	0.5	János Varga (HUN)		Luís Grilo (POR)	3.5	8.5
0	0	Hans-Jürgen Veil (FRG)	8:53	Per Lindholm (SWE)	4	9.5
3	1	Ion Baciu (ROU)		Ikuei Yamamoto (JPN)	3	5.5
4	1	Hristo Traikov (BUL)		Józef Lipień (POL)	3	8
3.5	0	Rustam Kazakov (URS)	4:36	Othon Moschidis (GRE)	4	9.5
9.5	4	Jan Neckář (TCH)	1:21	Risto Björlin (FIN)	0	2

=== Round 5 ===
TPP	MPP		Time		MPP	TPP
4.5	4	János Varga (HUN)	8:35	Hans-Jürgen Veil (FRG)	0	0
6	3	Ion Baciu (ROU)		Hristo Traikov (BUL)	1	5
8.5	3	Ikuei Yamamoto (JPN)		Rustam Kazakov (URS)	1	4.5
2		Risto Björlin (FIN)		Bye		

=== Round 6 ===
TPP	MPP		Time		MPP	TPP
5	3	Risto Björlin (FIN)		János Varga (HUN)	1	5.5
3	3	Hans-Jürgen Veil (FRG)		Hristo Traikov (BUL)	1	6
4.5		Rustam Kazakov (URS)		Bye		

=== Round 7 ===
TPP	MPP		Time		MPP	TPP
5	0.5	Rustam Kazakov (URS)		János Varga (HUN)	3.5	9
8	3	Risto Björlin (FIN)		Hans-Jürgen Veil (FRG)	1	4

=== Final ===
Results from the preliminary round are carried forward into the final (shown in yellow).

TPP	MPP		Time		MPP	TPP
0	0	Rustam Kazakov (URS)	2:58	Hans-Jürgen Veil (FRG)	4	4

== Final standings ==
1. Rustam Kazakov (URS)
2. Hans-Jürgen Veil (FRG)
3. Risto Björlin (FIN)
4. János Varga (HUN)
5. Hristo Traikov (BUL)
6. Ion Baciu (ROU)
7. Ikuei Yamamoto (JPN)
