= Milovan Tasić =

Serbian basketball player and actor (1947–2024)

Personal information
- Born: 1 September 1947 Donje Crnatovo, PR Serbia, FPR Yugoslavia
- Died: 6 June 2024 (aged 76) Belgrade, Serbia
- Listed height: 2.24 m (7 ft 4 in)

Career information
- NBA draft: 1991: undrafted
- Playing career: 1968–1979
- Position: Center

Career history
- 1968–1979: Radnički Belgrade

Career highlights
- Yugoslavian League champion (1973); Yugoslav Basketball Cup: winner 1975–76

Milovan Tasić (Serbian Cyrillic: Милован Тасић; 11 September 1947 – 6 June 2024) was a Serbian professional basketball player and actor.

== Career ==
Milovan Tasić began playing the sport at age of 21. While his height was seen as a great advantage, he struggled with movement. Recruited by the seasoned coach Slobodan Ivković to BKK Radnički, Milovan led the team to a historic victory in the 1972–73 season, clinching the Yugoslavian championship. Despite not being the favorites, they secured the title before the final round with a win over Bosnia. The following season, Radnički reached the Champions Cup semi-finals but was overpowered by the Italian team Varese. They played two matches: the first in Varese on March 14, 1974, ending in a 105:78 loss for Radnički, and the second in Belgrade on March 21, 1974, where Radnički triumphed with a score of 83:70, yet it wasn't enough to advance to the final. Winning the Yugoslav Cup in 1976 was another highlight, where they bested Rabotnički from Skopje with a final score of 89:75. In 1977, Radnički made it to the Cup Winners' Cup final but narrowly lost to the Italian squad Forst Canta by a single point, 87:86.

=== BKK Radnički ===
The champion team of Radnički played in the composition of Dragoslav Ražnatović, Milun Marović, Miroljub Damnjanović, Dragan Ivković, Srećko Jarić, Miroslav Mile Đorđević, Dragan Vučinić, Ivan Šarac, Dušan Trivalić, Dragoljub Zmijanac, Jovica Veljović, Milovan Tasić, Dušan Zupančić and Nikola Bjegović.

Tasić spent his entire basketball career in the Radnički basketball club, where he played 200 games and scored 601 baskets.

=== Filmography ===
In addition to basketball, because of his height, he also got minor film roles. His two most famous ones were "Marathonians running a lap of honor" and "Who's singing there".

Between 1982 and 1991, Milovan Tasić, in addition to the film Ko to tamo peva, appeared in seven more films, namely: The Marathoners Run the Circle of Honor (1982), The Secret of the Monastery Brandy (1988), Crazy Years (1988), Some Strange Land (1988), Let's Make Love 2 (1989), Vampires Are Among Us (1989) and It's All Spacemen's Fault (1991).
