= Wrestling at the 1968 Summer Olympics – Men's Greco-Roman 57 kg =

Men's Greco-Roman 57 kg at the Games of the XIX Olympiad
- Venue: Insurgentes Ice Rink
- Dates: 23–26 October 1968
- Competitors: 24 from 24 nations

Medalists
1st place, gold medalist(s)		János Varga	Hungary
2nd place, silver medalist(s)		Ion Baciu	Romania
3rd place, bronze medalist(s)		Ivan Kochergin	Soviet Union

The Men's Greco-Roman bantamweight at the 1968 Summer Olympics as part of the wrestling program were held at the Insurgentes Ice Rink. The bantamweight was the second-lightest weight class, allowing wrestlers up to 57 kilograms.

== Medalists ==
Gold	János Varga; Hungary
Silver	Ion Baciu; Romania
Bronze	Ivan Kochergin; Soviet Union

== Tournament results ==
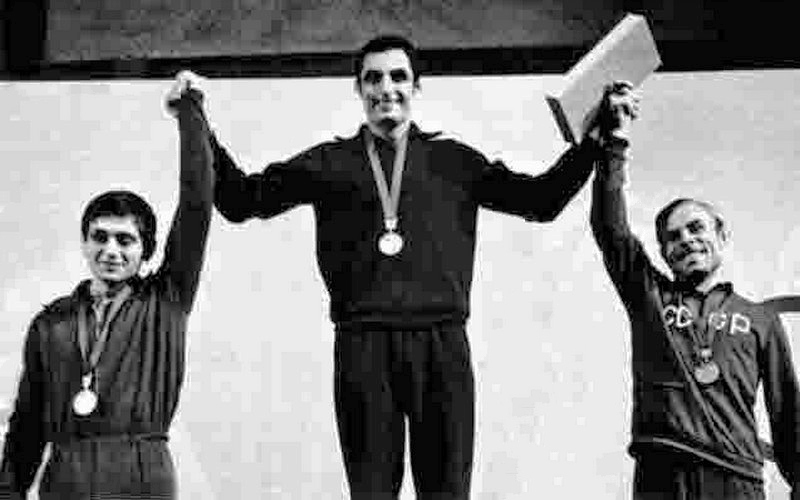
Left-right: Baciu, Varga, Kochergin

The competition used a form of negative points tournament, with negative points given for any result short of a fall. Accumulation of 6 negative points eliminated the wrestler. When only two or three wrestlers remain, a special final round is used to determine the order of the medals.

Legend

- TF — Won by Fall
- DQ — Won by Passivity or forfeit
- D2 — Both wrestlers lost by Passivity
- DNA — Did not appear
- TPP — Total penalty points
- MPP — Match penalty points

Penalties

- 0 — Won by Fall and Disqualification
- 0.5 — Won by Technical Superiority
- 1 — Won by Points
- 2 — Draw
- 2.5 — Draw, Passivity
- 3 — Lost by Points
- 3.5 — Lost by Technical Superiority
- 4 — Lost by Fall and Disqualification

=== 1st round ===
TPP	MPP		Score		MPP	TPP
3	3	David Hazewinkel (USA)		Ion Baciu (ROU)	1	1
4	4	Johnny Nielsen (DEN)	DQ	Khristo Traykov (BUL)	0	0
1	1	Ibrahim El-Sayed (EGY)		Rodolfo Guerra (MEX)	3	3
4	4	Herbert Singerman (CAN)	TF / 10:51	Jean Nakouzi (LIB)	0	0
3	3	Roland Svensson (SWE)		Koji Sakurama (JPN)	1	1
2.5	2.5	Arthur Spaenhoven (BEL)		Hartmut Puls (GDR)	2.5	2.5
4	4	Fritz Stange (FRG)	TF / 9:08	Ivan Kochergin (URS)	0	0
4	4	Luís Grilo (POR)	TF / 2:47	János Varga (HUN)	0	0
3	3	Karlo Čović (YUG)		Othon Moskhidis (GRE)	1	1
0	0	Risto Björlin (FIN)	TF / 4:38	Javier Raxón (GUA)	4	4
3	3	Khalifa Karouane (MAR)		An Chun-Young (KOR)	1	1
1	1	Kaya Özcan (TUR)		Józef Lipień (POL)	3	3

=== 2nd round ===
TPP	MPP		Score		MPP	TPP
3	0	David Hazewinkel (USA)	TF / 8:28	Johnny Nielsen (DEN)	4	8
2	1	Ion Baciu (ROU)		Hristo Traikov (BUL)	3	3
1	0	Ibrahim El-Sayed (EGY)	TF / 1:30	Herbert Singerman (CAN)	4	8
4	1	Rodolfo Guerra (MEX)		Jean Nakouzi (LIB)	3	3
6	3	Roland Svensson (SWE)		Arthur Spaenhoven (BEL)	1	3.5
1	0	Koji Sakurama (JPN)	TF / 10:45	Hartmut Puls (GDR)	4	6.5
5	1	Fritz Stange (FRG)		Luís Grilo (POR)	3	7
3	3	Ivan Kochergin (URS)		János Varga (HUN)	1	1
4	1	Karlo Čović (YUG)		Risto Björlin (FIN)	3	3
1	0	Othon Moschidis (GRE)	TF / 1:23	Javier Raxon (GUA)	4	8
6	3	Khalifa Karouane (MAR)		Kaya Özcan (TUR)	1	2
3	2	An Chun-Young (KOR)		Józef Lipień (POL)	2	5

=== 3rd round ===
TPP	MPP		Score		MPP	TPP
3	0	David Hazewinkel (USA)	DQ	Hristo Traikov (BUL)	4	7
3	1	Ion Baciu (ROU)		Ibrahim El-Sayed (EGY)	3	4
8	4	Rodolfo Guerra (MEX)	TF / 2:44	Koji Sakurama (JPN)	0	1
6	3	Jean Nakouzi (LIB)		Arthur Spaenhoven (BEL)	1	4.5
4	1	Ivan Kochergin (URS)		Karlo Čović (YUG)	3	7
2	1	János Varga (HUN)		Othon Moschidis (GRE)	3	4
3	0	Risto Björlin (FIN)	TF / 9:00	Józef Lipień (POL)	4	9
4	1	An Chun-Young (KOR)		Kaya Özcan (TUR)	3	5
5		Fritz Stange (FRG)		DNA		

=== 4th round ===
TPP	MPP		Score		MPP	TPP
6	3	David Hazewinkel (USA)		Ibrahim El-Sayed (EGY)	1	5
5.5	2.5	Ion Baciu (ROU)		Koji Sakurama (JPN)	2.5	3.5
7.5	3	Arthur Spaenhoven (BEL)		Ivan Kochergin (URS)	1	5
3	1	János Varga (HUN)		Risto Björlin (FIN)	3	6
5	1	Othon Moschidis (GRE)		An Chun-Young (KOR)	3	7
5		Kaya Özcan (TUR)		Bye		

=== 5th round ===
TPP	MPP		Score		MPP	TPP
9	4	Kaya Özcan (TUR)	TF / 6:13	Ion Baciu (ROU)	0	5.5
9	4	Ibrahim El-Sayed (EGY)	TF / 10:49	Ivan Kochergin (URS)	0	5
6.5	3	Koji Sakurama (JPN)		János Varga (HUN)	1	4
5		Othon Moschidis (GRE)		Bye		

=== 6th round ===
TPP	MPP		Score		MPP	TPP
7.5	2.5	Othon Moschidis (GRE)		Ivan Kochergin (URS)	2.5	7.5
7.5	2	Ion Baciu (ROU)		János Varga (HUN)	2	6

=== Final round (2nd-4th places) ===
Results from the preliminary round are carried forward into the final (shown in yellow).

TPP	MPP		Score		MPP	TPP
	2.5	Othon Moschidis (GRE)		Ivan Kochergin (URS)	2.5	
6.5	4	Othon Moschidis (GRE)	TF / 2:32	Ion Baciu (ROU)	0	
6.5	4	Ivan Kochergin (URS)	DQ	Ion Baciu (ROU)	4	4

== Final standings ==
1. János Varga (HUN)
2. Ion Baciu (ROU)
3. Ivan Kochergin (URS)
4. Othon Moschidis (GRE)
5. Koji Sakurama (JPN)
6. Kaya Özcan (TUR) and Ibrahim El-Sayed (EGY)
