= Yugoslavia at the 1971 Mediterranean Games =

- IOC code: YUG
- NOC: Yugoslav Olympic Committee

in İzmir
- Medals Ranked 2nd: Gold 26 Silver 26 Bronze 26 Total 78

Mediterranean Games appearances (overview)
- 1951; 1955; 1959; 1963; 1967; 1971; 1975; 1979; 1983; 1987; 1991

Other related appearances
- Bosnia and Herzegovina (1993–pres.); Croatia (1993–pres.); Slovenia (1993–pres.); Serbia and Montenegro (1997–2005); Montenegro (2009–pres.); Serbia (2009–pres.); North Macedonia (2013–pres.); Kosovo (2018–pres.)

Yugoslavia competed at the 1971 Mediterranean Games held in İzmir, Turkey.

== Medalists ==
Medal	Name	Sport	Event
Gold	Vera Nikolić	Athletics	Women's 800m
Gold	Vera Nikolić	Athletics	Women's 1500m
Gold	Milena Leskovac	Athletics	Women's 100m hurdles
Gold	Milan Spasojević	Athletics	Men's Triple jump
Gold	Snežana Hrepevnik	Athletics	Women's High jump
Gold	Basketball team: Vinko Jelovac Miroljub Damjanović Milun Marović Žarko Zečević Dragan Ivković Blagoja Georgievski Dragan Kićanović Damir Šolman Goran Latifić Stanislav Bizjak Zoran Nestorović	Basketball	Men's tournament
Gold	Dragomir Vujković	Boxing	Middleweight
Gold	Football team: Ivan Ćurković Radivoje Drašković Ljubiša Drenovaković Todor Grebenarević Dušan Jovanović Ilija Katić Josip Kečkeš Aleksandar Milojković Bora Milutinović Mesud Nalić Marjan Novak Aleksandar Panajotović Ognjen Petrović Josip Pirmajer Branko Radović Vladimir Savić Ištvan Šanta Momčilo Vujačić	Football	Men's tournament
Gold	Janez Brodnik	Gymnastics	Men's Individual all-around
Gold	Janez Brodnik, Miloš Vratič, Milenko Kersnič, Drago Šoštarić, Zoran Ivanović	Gymnastics	Men's Team all-around
Gold	Miloš Vratič	Gymnastics	Men's Pommel horse
Gold	Janez Brodnik	Gymnastics	Men's Parallel bars
Gold	Janez Brodnik	Gymnastics	Men's Horizontal bar
Gold	Slobodan Kraljević	Judo	80kg
Gold	Goran Žuvela	Judo	93kg
Gold	Boško Marinko	Wrestling	Greco-Roman - 52kg
Gold	Karlo Čović	Wrestling	Greco-Roman - 57kg
Gold	Sreten Damjanović	Wrestling	Greco-Roman - 68kg
Gold	Josip Čorak	Wrestling	Greco-Roman - 90kg
Gold	Nenad Miloš	Swimming	Men's 100m Backstroke
Gold	Ana Boban	Swimming	Women's 100m Freestyle
Gold	Water polo team: Dušan Antunović Siniša Belemarić Dejan Dabović Jakov Džoni Zoran Janković Ronald Lopatni Uroš Marović Miroslav Poljak Ratko Rudić Mirko Sandić Milovan Tomić	Water polo	Men's tournament
Gold	Zdravko Milutinović	Shooting	50m rifle prone
Gold	Zdravko Milutinović	Shooting	50m rifle three positions
Gold	Volleyball team: Slavko Balandžić Aleksandar Boričić Zvonimir Bračić Vinko Dobrić Mirsad Elezović Radoslav Karaklajić Mladen Kos Laslo Lukač Dušan Radeljević Arpad Seker Živojin Vračarić Mehmedalija Žilić	Volleyball	Men's tournament
Gold	Fabris Minski	Sailing	Finn
Silver	Ivica Karasi	Athletics	Men's 200m
Silver	Jože Međimurec	Athletics	Men's 800m
Silver	Ivan Karasi, Predrag Križan, Miro Kocuvan, Luciano Sušanj	Athletics	Men's 4×100m relay
Silver	Ivan Karasi, Miro Kocuvan, Jože Međimurec, Luciano Sušanj	Athletics	Men's 4×400m relay
Silver	Miljenko Rak	Athletics	Men's Long jump
Silver	Radoslav Zunjanin	Boxing	Light Heavyweight
Silver	Nenad Matejić	Boxing	Heavyweight
Silver	Miloš Vratič	Gymnastics	Men's Individual all-around
Silver	Milenko Kersnič	Gymnastics	Men's Pommel horse
Silver	Janez Brodnik	Gymnastics	Men's Still rings
Silver	Miloš Vratič	Gymnastics	Men's Parallel bars
Silver	Miloš Vratič	Gymnastics	Men's Horizontal bar
Silver	Erna Havelka	Gymnastics	Women's Individual all-around
Silver	Erna Havelka, Nataša Bajin Šljepica, Magda Milošević, Olga Bumbić, Nevena Puškarević	Gymnastics	Women's Team all-around
Silver	Nataša Bajin Šljepica	Gymnastics	Women's Uneven bars
Silver	Leopold Herenčić	Weightlifting	67,5kg
Silver	Stanko Topolčnik	Judo	63kg
Silver	Pavle Bajčetić	Judo	+100kg
Silver	Risto Darlev	Wrestling	Freestyle - 57kg
Silver	Safer Sali	Wrestling	Freestyle - 68kg
Silver	Tefik Demiri	Wrestling	Freestyle - 90kg
Silver	Pavle Bajčetić	Wrestling	Freestyle - 100kg
Silver	Momir Kecman	Wrestling	Greco-Roman - 74kg
Silver	Milan Nenadić	Wrestling	Greco-Roman - 82kg
Silver	Aleksandar Pavličević	Swimming	Men's 100m Butterfly
Silver	Ana Boban	Swimming	Women's 200m Medley
Bronze	Ivica Karasi	Athletics	Men's 100m
Bronze	Predrag Križan	Athletics	Men's 200m
Bronze	Luciano Sušanj	Athletics	Men's 400m
Bronze	Marian Gredelj	Athletics	Men's Discus throw
Bronze	Srećko Štiglić	Athletics	Men's Hammer throw
Bronze	Đurđica Rajher	Athletics	Women's 1500m
Bronze	Đurđa Fočić	Athletics	Women's 100m hurdles
Bronze	Đurđa Fočić, Milena Leskovac, Breda Babošek, Vera Nikolić	Athletics	Women's 4×100m relay
Bronze	Breda Babošek	Athletics	Women's High jump
Bronze	Florijan Valenčić, Jože Valenčić, Cvijetko Bilić, Janez Zakotnik	Cycling	Team time trial
Bronze	Vera Jeftimijades	Fencing	Women's Individual foil
Bronze	Milenko Kersnič	Gymnastics	Men's Individual all-around
Bronze	Janez Brodnik	Gymnastics	Men's Floor exercise
Bronze	Janez Brodnik	Gymnastics	Men's Pommel horse
Bronze	Miloš Vratič	Gymnastics	Men's Vault
Bronze	Milenko Kersnič	Gymnastics	Men's Parallel bars
Bronze	Olga Bumbić	Gymnastics	Women's Vault
Bronze	Magda Milošević	Gymnastics	Women's Vault
Bronze	Aca Jordanov	Wrestling	Freestyle - 62kg
Bronze	Dobre Marinkov	Wrestling	Freestyle - 74kg
Bronze	Slavko Koletić	Wrestling	Greco-Roman - 62kg
Bronze	Petar Cucić	Wrestling	Greco-Roman - 100kg
Bronze	Predrag Miloš	Swimming	Men's 100m Backstroke
Bronze	Jovan Kovačić, Rene Lustig, Aleksandar Pavličević, Sandro Rudan	Swimming	Men's 4×100m Freestyle
Bronze	Jovan Kovačić, Veljko Rogošić, Aleksandar Pavličević, Sandro Rudan	Swimming	Men's 4×200m Freestyle
Bronze	Jovan Kovačić, Zdravko Divjak, Aleksandar Pavličević, Nenad Miloš	Swimming	Men's 4×100m Medley

== Medals by sport ==
Sport	Gold	Silver	Bronze	Total
Gymnastics	5	8	7	20
Athletics	5	5	9	19
Wrestling	4	6	4	14
Swimming	2	2	4	8
Judo	2	2	0	4
Shooting	2	0	0	2
Boxing	1	2	0	3
Basketball	1	0	0	1
Football	1	0	0	1
Sailing	1	0	0	1
Volleyball	1	0	0	1
Water polo	1	0	0	1
Weightlifting	0	1	0	1
Cycling	0	0	1	1
Fencing	0	0	1	1
Totals (15 entries)	26	26	26	78
