= Wrestling at the 1971 Mediterranean Games =

- Dates: October 1971

The wrestling tournament at the 1971 Mediterranean Games was held in İzmir, Turkey.

== Medal table ==
* Host nation (Turkey)

Rank	Nation	Gold	Silver	Bronze	Total
1	Turkey	14	3	0	17
2	Yugoslavia	4	6	4	14
3	France	1	3	0	4
4	Italy	1	2	1	4
5	Egypt	0	2	5	7
6	Syria	0	2	3	5
7	Greece	0	1	7	8
8	Morocco	0	1	0	1
Totals (8 entries)		20	20	20	60

== Medalists ==
=== Men's freestyle ===
Event	Gold	Silver	Bronze
48 kg	Sefer Baygın; Turkey	Muharrem Nahlaomi; Syria	Autzis Merkourios; Greece
52 kg	Salim Bak; Turkey	Vincenzo Grassi; Italy	Petros Triantafyllidis; Greece
57 kg	Hasan Kahraman; Turkey	Risto Darlev; Yugoslavia	Ibrahim El-Sayed; Egypt
62 kg	Erdal Karakaş; Turkey	Théodule Toulotte; France	Aca Jordanov; Yugoslavia
68 kg	Servet Aydemir; Turkey	Safer Sali; Yugoslavia	Nikos Karypidis; Greece
74 kg	Mehmet Uzun; Turkey	Gian Matteo Ranzi; Italy	Dobre Marinkov; Yugoslavia
82 kg	Asım Bülbül; Turkey	Daniel Robin; France	Iordanis Karageorgiou; Greece
90 kg	Mehmet Güçlü; Turkey	Tefik Demiri; Yugoslavia	Dimitrius Spiridopoulos; Greece
100 kg	Gıyasettin Yılmaz; Turkey	Pavle Bajčetić; Yugoslavia	Tolemat Sate; Syria
+100 kg	Alaattin Yıldırım; Turkey	Mohammed Cuma; Syria	Mahmoud Emara; Egypt

=== Men's Greco-Roman ===
Event	Gold	Silver	Bronze
48 kg	Lorenzo Calafiore; Italy	Hızır Sarı; Turkey	Hassan Esabani; Egypt
52 kg	Boško Marinko; Yugoslavia	Mohamed Karmous; Morocco	Mohamed Salem; Egypt
57 kg	Karlo Čović; Yugoslavia	Othon Moskhidis; Greece	Fawzi Salloum; Syria
62 kg	Mücahit Güngör; Turkey	Théodule Toulotte; France	Slavko Koletić; Yugoslavia
68 kg	Sreten Damjanović; Yugoslavia	Seyyit Hışırlı; Turkey	Nikolaos Konara; Greece
74 kg	Daniel Robin; France	Momir Kecman; Yugoslavia	Ibrahim Ferit; Egypt
82 kg	Ali Yağmur; Turkey	Milan Nenadić; Yugoslavia	Dimitrios Savvas; Greece
90 kg	Josip Čorak; Yugoslavia	İbrahim Kumaş; Turkey	Muharrem Hochem; Syria
100 kg	Gürbüz Lü; Turkey	Said Emfakafav; Egypt	Petar Cucić; Yugoslavia
+100 kg	Ömer Topuz; Turkey	Lotfi Ameira; Egypt	Giuseppe Marcucci; Italy
