= BKK Radnički in international competitions =

BKK Radnički's history and statistics in FIBA Europe and Euroleague Basketball (company) competitions.

== European competitions ==
Record	Round	Opponent club		
1973–74 FIBA European Champions Cup 1st–tier
8–3	1st round	(Luxembourg) Amicale	89–49; Belgrade	
8–3	2nd round	(Sweden) Solna	78–67 a	77–75 h
8–3	QF	(Austria) Wienerberger	68–79 a	91–76 h
8–3	QF	(Spain) Real Madrid	74–113 a	95–87 h
8–3	QF	(Bulgaria) Academic	104–86 h	107–93 a
8–3	SF	(Italy) Ignis Varese	78–105 a	83–70 h
1976–77 FIBA European Cup Winners' Cup 2nd–tier
7–4	1st round	Bye	Radnički qualified without games	
7–4	2nd round	(Poland) Wybrzeże Gdańsk	94–101 a	117–86 h
7–4	QF	(Soviet Union) Spartak Leningrad	84–99 a	85–80 h
7–4	QF	(Italy) Cinzano Milano	87–73 a	85–99 h
7–4	QF	(Czechoslovakia) Slavia VŠ Praha	115–70 h	84–54 a
7–4	SF	(Spain) Juventud Schweppes	77–74 a	94–80 h
7–4	F	(Italy) Forst Cantù	86–87; March 29, Nuevo Palacio de los Deportes, Palma de Mallorca	
1978–79 FIBA European Cup Winners' Cup 2nd–tier
6–4	1st round	(Turkey) Tofaş	114–79 h	93–97 a
6–4	2nd round	(Czechoslovakia) Dukla Olomouc	111–83 h	97–85 a
6–4	QF	(Austria) UBSC Wien	88–82 a	74–71 h
6–4	QF	(Italy) Sinudyne Bologna	96–95 h	81–94 a
6–4	QF	(Spain) FC Barcelona	92–99 h	95–102 a
1979–80 FIBA Korać Cup 3rd–tier
1–1	1st round	(Israel) Hapoel Tel Aviv	82–86 a	83–80 h
1992–93 FIBA Korać Cup 3rd–tier
–	1st round	(Ukraine) Stroitel Kharkov	Radnički withdrew without games	
1998–99 FIBA Korać Cup 3rd–tier
3–5	1st round	Bye	Radnički qualified without games	
3–5	2nd round	(Slovakia) AŠK Inter Slovnaft	80–52 a	85–83 h
3–5	2nd round	(Russia) Sportakademklub Moscow	Sportakademklub withdrew without games	
3–5	2nd round	(Turkey) Galatasaray	64–75 h	72–74 a
3–5	3rd round	(Sweden) Norrköping Dolphins	107–93 h	70–79 a
3–5	Top 16	(Greece) Panionios	74–88 h	71–81 a
1999–00 FIBA Saporta Cup 2nd–tier
5–7	1st round	(Czech Republic) Mlekarna Kunin	69–72 a	98–83 h
5–7	1st round	(Germany) Skyliners Frankfurt	73–46 h	67–83 a
5–7	1st round	(Slovenia) Krka	58–62 a	65–76 h
5–7	1st round	(Finland) Torpan Pojat	69–64 h	72–73 a
5–7	1st round	(Lithuania) Sakalai	80–77 h	95–100 a
5–7	2nd round	(Turkey) Darüşşafaka	77–66 h	60–75 a

== Record ==
BKK Radnički has overall, from 1973–74 (first participation) to 1999–00 (last participation): 32 wins against 25 defeats in 56 games for all the European club competitions.

- EuroLeague: 8–3 (11)
  - FIBA Saporta Cup: 18–15 (33)
    - FIBA Korać Cup: 4–6 (10)
