= 1972–73 Yugoslav First Basketball League =

- League: Yugoslav First Basketball League
- Sport: Basketball

1972-73
- Season champions: (Socialist Republic of Serbia) Radnički Belgrade

Yugoslav First Basketball League seasons
- ← 1971–72 1973–74 →

The 1972–73 Yugoslav First Basketball League season was the 29th season of the Yugoslav First Basketball League, the highest professional basketball league in SFR Yugoslavia.

The league expanded from 12 to 14 teams. In addition to regular promotion (winners of the Yugoslav Second Basketball League's east and west divisions, respectively, Kombinat Servo Mihalj Zrenjanin and KK Bosna), the extra two new teams were added via a 4-team round-robin play-in tournament consisting of the bottom two 1971–72 Yugoslav First Basketball League teams (KK Željezničar Karlovac and Oriolik Slavnoski Brod) as well as the second placed teams from the Yugoslav Second Basketball League's east and west divisions, respectively (Mladost Zemun and Željezničar Sarajevo). Held in Sombor during early May 1972, the league expansion play-in tournament was won by Željezničar Karlovac and Željezničar Sarajevo.

== Teams ==
(Socialist Republic of Serbia) SR Serbia

- Borac Čačak
- Crvena Zvezda
- Kombinat Zrenjanin
- OKK Beograd
- Partizan
- Radnički Belgrade

(Socialist Republic of Croatia) SR Croatia

- Jugoplastika
- Lokomotiva
- Zadar
- Željezničar Karlovac

(Socialist Republic of Bosnia and Herzegovina) SR Bosnia and Herzegovina

- Bosna
- Željezničar Sarajevo

(Socialist Republic of Macedonia) SR Macedonia

- Rabotnički

(Socialist Republic of Slovenia) SR Slovenia

- Olimpija

== Classification ==
	Regular season ranking 1972-73	G	V	P	PF	PS	Pt
1.	Radnički Belgrade	26	22	4	2449	2257	44
2.	Crvena Zvezda	26	20	6	2405	2223	40
3.	Partizan	26	16	10	2336	2197	32
4.	Borac Čačak	26	16	10	2443	2322	32
5.	Olimpija	26	14	12	2345	2242	28
6.	Jugoplastika	26	14	12	2341	2263	28
7.	OKK Beograd	26	14	12	2220	2223	28
8.	Lokomotiva	26	13	13	2342	2341	26
9.	Zadar	26	13	13	2106	2160	26
10.	Rabotnički	26	12	14	2136	2162	24
11.	Željezničar Sarajevo	26	11	15	1998	2069	22
12.	Bosna	26	10	16	2067	2115	20
13.	Kombinat Zrenjanin	26	6	20	2241	2443	12
14.	Željezničar Karlovac	26	1	25	1972	2384	2

The winning roster of Radnički Belgrade:

- (Socialist Federal Republic of Yugoslavia) Dragan Ivković
- (Socialist Federal Republic of Yugoslavia) Dragan Vučinić
- (Socialist Federal Republic of Yugoslavia) Dušan Trivalić
- (Socialist Federal Republic of Yugoslavia) Dragoljub Zmijanac
- (Socialist Federal Republic of Yugoslavia) Jovica Veljović
- (Socialist Federal Republic of Yugoslavia) Dragoslav Ražnatović
- (Socialist Federal Republic of Yugoslavia) Miroslav Ðordević
- (Socialist Federal Republic of Yugoslavia) Milun Marović
- (Socialist Federal Republic of Yugoslavia) Miroljub Damjanović
- (Socialist Federal Republic of Yugoslavia) Srećko Jarić
- (Socialist Federal Republic of Yugoslavia) Radovan Novović
- (Socialist Federal Republic of Yugoslavia) Milovan Tasić
- (Socialist Federal Republic of Yugoslavia) Dušan Zupančić
- (Socialist Federal Republic of Yugoslavia) Nikola Bjegović
- (Socialist Federal Republic of Yugoslavia) Slobodan Zimonjić

Coach: (Socialist Federal Republic of Yugoslavia) Slobodan Ivković

== Results ==
Home \ Away	RAD	CZV	PAR	BOR	OLI	JUG	OKK	LOK	ZAD	RAB	ŽSA	BOS	KOM	ŽKA
Radnički Belgrade	—	89–80	99–88	96–86	98–88	113–87	89–84	110–102	98–83	81–91	92–82	94–86	119–102	98–82
Crvena Zvezda	82–78	—	85–80	108–98	103–94	96–90	85–91	82–78	107–96	92–85	99–92	96–88	113–94	97–76
Partizan	81–93	84–92	—	84–87	101–88	97–79	68–65	106–96	95–81	76–80	88–80	103–93	103–70	111–71
Borac Čačak	91–95	81–79	87–94	—	118–96	89–85	102–89	109–91	104–77	97–92	95–76	95–79	148–113	87–80
Olimpija	84–88	78–81	86–96	100–81	—	97–86	91–82	105–88	76–64	97–78	97–69	99–86	90–78	90–78
Jugoplastika	105–112	91–87	95–101	96–85	109–103	—	109–92	85–87	93–81	84–69	86–80	97–73	110–107	103–62
OKK Beograd	109–102	73–97	80–82	95–85	84–80	79–78	—	91–104	73–82	77–71	84–73	87–76	84–73	97–89
Lokomotiva	87–73	96–102	108–86	91–86	100–93	73–99	99–100	—	84–82	93–86	105–92	83–76	119–85	106–82
Zadar	82–84	72–70	73–68	90–94	84–82	81–76	85–96	74–72	—	81–72	85–72	69–59	98–85	97–67
Rabotnički	84–85	78–76	99–97	84–96	76–88	83–89	87–71	101–83	106–93	—	69–65	79–80	97–85	86–69
Željezničar Sarajevo	70–90	78–88	65–72	81–78	81–73	61–57	69–62	79–63	72–76	76–62	—	82–76	77–72	99–80
Bosna	77–79	74–78	73–65	86–82	75–82	78–81	79–78	85–70	101–75	70–71	77–94	—	68–65	88–70
Kombinat Zrenjanin	90–97	93–108	114–120	73–84	79–83	94–96	88–101	87–79	93–80	74–70	83–70	76–83	—	85–70
Željezničar Karlovac	74–97	100–120	68–90	92–98	81–99	83–75	80–84	63–79	61–67	76–86	60–65	65–91	70–79	—

Source: Pearlbasket
Legend: Blue = home team win; Red = away team win.
Matches with lighter background shading were decided after overtime.

== Scoring leaders ==
1. Damir Šolman (Jugoplastika) - ___ points (31.0ppg)

== Qualification in 1973-74 season European competitions ==
FIBA European Champions Cup

- Radnički Belgrade (champions)

FIBA Cup Winner's Cup

- Crvena Zvezda (Cup winners)

FIBA Korać Cup

- Partizan (3rd)
- Borac Čačak (4th)
- Olimpija (5th)
- Jugoplastika (6th)

== Basketball Cup ==
=== Bracket ===
Eightfinals
Borac Čačak	86
Crvena zvezda	89
Radnički FOB Belgrade	88
OKK Beograd	80
Jugoplastika
Domžale
Olimpija
Rabotnički
Lokomotiva
Kombinat Zrenjanin
Bosna	61
Zadar	80
Željezničar Sarajevo	71
Industromontaža	60
Partizan	99
Ivangrad	54

Quarterfinals
Crvena zvezda	90
Radnički Belgrade	79
Jugoplastika	90
Olimpija	87
Lokomotiva	93
Zadar	92
Željezničar Sarajevo	71
Partizan	97

Semifinals
Crvena zvezda	84
Jugoplastika	75
Lokomotiva	86
Partizan	92

Finals
Crvena zvezda	71
Partizan	65
