= Srećko Jarić =

Serbian basketball player

Personal information
- Born: 1951 (age 74–75) Kikinda, SR Serbia, SFR Yugoslavia
- Listed height: 1.87 m (6 ft 2 in)

Career information
- NBA draft: 1973: undrafted
- Playing career: 1968–1990
- Position: Point guard
- Number: 13, 14

Career history
- 1968–1980: Radnički Belgrade
- 1980–1984: Šibenka
- 1984–1987: IMT Belgrade
- 1987–1988: Šibenka
- 1988–1990: Radnički Belgrade

Career highlights
- FIBA Saporta Cup Finals Top Scorer (1977); 2× Yugoslav League champion (1973, 1983); 2× Yugoslav Cup winner (1976, 1987)

Srećko Jarić (Serbian Cyrillic: Срећко Јарић, born 1951) is a Serbian former professional basketball player. He played at the point guard position.

== Early career ==
Jarić began playing youth club basketball with the youth teams of Radnički Belgrade. EuroLeague Legend basketball coach Dušan Ivković, who was Jarić's head coach on the Radnički Belgrade youth team, stated that Jarić was the, "biggest talent that he ever had under his charge".

== Professional career ==
During his pro club career, Jarić played in the top-tier league of the former SFR Yugoslavia, the Yugoslav First Federal League. He played with the Yugoslav clubs Radnički Belgrade (under head coach Slobodan "Piva" Ivković), Šibenka (under head coaches Vlado Djurović and Zoran "Moka" Slavnić), and IMT Belgrade.

At the Yugoslav national level, Jarić won the Yugoslav First Federal League championship of the 1972–73 season, and the Yugoslav Cup title, in 1976, with Radnički Belgrade. With Šibenka, where he was a teammate of Dražen Petrović, Jarić also won the Yugoslav First Federal League championship of the 1982–83 season. However, the club later vacated the title. With IMT Belgrade, he won the Yugoslav Cup title, in 1987.

On the European-wide level, in Europe's premier level competition, the FIBA European Champions Cup (EuroLeague)'s 1973–74 season, Jarić led Radnički Belgrade to the competition's semifinals. In Europe's secondary level FIBA European Cup Winners' Cup (FIBA Saporta Cup)'s 1976–77 season, Jarić was the top scorer of the competition's finals. As a member of Šibenka, Jarić played in the finals of Europe's third-tier level competition, the FIBA Korać Cup, in both the 1981–82 season, and the 1982–83 season.

== National team career ==
As a member of the Yugoslav junior national team, Jarić played at the 1970 FIBA European Championship for Junior Men.

== Personal life ==
Jarić was born in Kikinda, SR Serbia, SFR Yugoslavia. He is the father of the former NBA player Marko Jarić. He is also the former father-in-law of the Brazilian supermodel Adriana Lima.
