= Alfredo López =

Alfredo López may refer to:

- Alfredo López (wrestler) (born 1947), Mexican wrestler
- Alfredo Lopez (activist) (born 1949), American Internet activist and writer
- Alfredo López Aceves (died 2024), Mexican educator and politician
- Alfredo López Arencibia (1894–1926), Cuban trade unionist
- Alfredo López Austin (1936–2021), Mexican historian
