= Judo at the Mediterranean Games =

Judo competition

- Current event or competition: Judo at the 2026 Mediterranean Games

Competition details
- Discipline: Judo
- Type: Quadrennial
- Organiser: International Committee of Mediterranean Games (CIJM)

History
- First edition: İzmir 1971
- Editions: 14
- Most recent: Taranto 2026
- Next edition: Pristina 2030

Judo is one of the sports at the quadrennial Mediterranean Games competition. It has been a sport in the program of the Mediterranean Games since its inception in 1971.

== Editions ==
Games	Year	Host city	Host country	Judo events				Best nation
Games	Year	Host city	Host country	Men	Women	Mixed	Total	Best nation
VI	1971	İzmir	Turkey	5	—	—	5	Yugoslavia (YUG)
VII	1975	Algiers	Algeria	6	—	—	6	France (FRA)
VIII	1979	Split	Yugoslavia	8	—	—	8	France (FRA)
IX	1983	Casablanca	Morocco	8	—	—	8	France (FRA)
X	1987	Latakia	Syria	8	—	—	8	France (FRA)
XI	1991	Athens	Greece	7	—	—	7	France (FRA)
XII	1993	Perpignan	France	7	—	—	7	France (FRA)
XIII	1997	Bari	Italy	7	7	—	14	France (FRA)
XIV	2001	Tunis	Tunisia	7	7	—	14	Italy (ITA)
XV	2005	Almería	Spain	7	7	—	14	Spain (ESP)
XVI	2009	Pescara	Italy	7	7	—	14	France (FRA)
XVII	2013	Mersin	Turkey	7	7	—	14	Slovenia (SLO)
XVIII	2018	Tarragona	Spain	7	7	—	14	Spain (ESP)
XIX	2022	Oran	Algeria	7	7	—	14	Spain (ESP)
XX	2026	Taranto	Italy	7	7	1	15	Turkey (TUR)

== All-time medal table ==
Updated after the most recent 2026 Mediterranean Games

Rank	Nation	Gold	Silver	Bronze	Total
1	France (FRA)	43	27	38	108
2	Italy (ITA)	31	37	44	112
3	Spain (ESP)	15	16	38	69
4	Turkey (TUR)	13	10	37	60
5	Egypt (EGY)	10	8	18	36
6	Slovenia (SLO)	8	10	16	34
7	Algeria (ALG)	8	8	27	43
8	Yugoslavia (YUG)	7	7	14	28
9	Kosovo (KOS)	6	2	6	14
10	Serbia (SRB)	5	7	5	17
11	Greece (GRE)	4	2	13	19
12	Tunisia (TUN)	3	14	25	42
13	Croatia (CRO)	3	1	7	11
14	Morocco (MAR)	2	6	16	24
15	Serbia and Montenegro (SCG)	1	2	7	10
16	Cyprus (CYP)	1	1	0	2
17	Portugal (POR)	1	0	2	3
18	Montenegro (MNE)	1	0	1	2
19	Bosnia and Herzegovina (BIH)	0	2	7	9
20	Syria (SYR)	0	1	2	3
21	Monaco (MON)	0	1	0	1
22	Lebanon (LBN)	0	0	1	1
Totals (22 entries)		162	162	324	648

== Best results by event and nation (2001-current) ==
Event		(Algeria) ALG	(Bosnia and Herzegovina) BIH	(Croatia) CRO	(Cyprus) CYP	(Egypt) EGY	(Spain) ESP	(France) FRA	(Greece) GRE	(Italy) ITA	(Kosovo) KOS	(Lebanon) LBN	(Morocco) MAR	(Montenegro) MNE	(Monaco) MON	(Portugal) POR	(Serbia and Montenegro) SCG	(Slovenia) SLO	(Serbia) SRB	(Syria) SYR	(Tunisia) TUN	(Turkey) TUR	(Socialist Federal Republic of Yugoslavia) YUG
Men's
Men's	60 kg	1st place, gold medalist(s)					1st place, gold medalist(s)		3rd place, bronze medalist(s)	1st place, gold medalist(s)		3rd place, bronze medalist(s)	1st place, gold medalist(s)		2nd place, silver medalist(s)			2nd place, silver medalist(s)		3rd place, bronze medalist(s)	1st place, gold medalist(s)	2nd place, silver medalist(s)	
Men's	66 kg	3rd place, bronze medalist(s)		3rd place, bronze medalist(s)	2nd place, silver medalist(s)	1st place, gold medalist(s)	1st place, gold medalist(s)	1st place, gold medalist(s)		1st place, gold medalist(s)			3rd place, bronze medalist(s)	3rd place, bronze medalist(s)			1st place, gold medalist(s)	2nd place, silver medalist(s)	1st place, gold medalist(s)		3rd place, bronze medalist(s)	3rd place, bronze medalist(s)	
Men's	73 kg	1st place, gold medalist(s)				3rd place, bronze medalist(s)	1st place, gold medalist(s)	1st place, gold medalist(s)		1st place, gold medalist(s)	1st place, gold medalist(s)		2nd place, silver medalist(s)					3rd place, bronze medalist(s)	2nd place, silver medalist(s)			1st place, gold medalist(s)	
Men's	81 kg	2nd place, silver medalist(s)		3rd place, bronze medalist(s)		2nd place, silver medalist(s)			3rd place, bronze medalist(s)	1st place, gold medalist(s)			3rd place, bronze medalist(s)	1st place, gold medalist(s)		1st place, gold medalist(s)		1st place, gold medalist(s)			1st place, gold medalist(s)	1st place, gold medalist(s)	3rd place, bronze medalist(s)
Men's	90 kg	2nd place, silver medalist(s)	3rd place, bronze medalist(s)			2nd place, silver medalist(s)	1st place, gold medalist(s)	1st place, gold medalist(s)	1st place, gold medalist(s)	2nd place, silver medalist(s)			2nd place, silver medalist(s)						1st place, gold medalist(s)			1st place, gold medalist(s)	
Men's	100 kg	2nd place, silver medalist(s)	2nd place, silver medalist(s)			1st place, gold medalist(s)	1st place, gold medalist(s)	1st place, gold medalist(s)	3rd place, bronze medalist(s)	2nd place, silver medalist(s)	3rd place, bronze medalist(s)								2nd place, silver medalist(s)		3rd place, bronze medalist(s)	3rd place, bronze medalist(s)	
Men's	+100 kg	2nd place, silver medalist(s)				3rd place, bronze medalist(s)	3rd place, bronze medalist(s)	1st place, gold medalist(s)		1st place, gold medalist(s)							3rd place, bronze medalist(s)	1st place, gold medalist(s)	1st place, gold medalist(s)		2nd place, silver medalist(s)	1st place, gold medalist(s)	
Women's
Women's	48 kg	1st place, gold medalist(s)					1st place, gold medalist(s)	1st place, gold medalist(s)		1st place, gold medalist(s)								3rd place, bronze medalist(s)	2nd place, silver medalist(s)		2nd place, silver medalist(s)	1st place, gold medalist(s)	
Women's	52 kg	1st place, gold medalist(s)		2nd place, silver medalist(s)	1st place, gold medalist(s)		1st place, gold medalist(s)	1st place, gold medalist(s)		2nd place, silver medalist(s)	1st place, gold medalist(s)		2nd place, silver medalist(s)					2nd place, silver medalist(s)	3rd place, bronze medalist(s)		1st place, gold medalist(s)	2nd place, silver medalist(s)	
Women's	57 kg	3rd place, bronze medalist(s)		1st place, gold medalist(s)			1st place, gold medalist(s)	2nd place, silver medalist(s)	1st place, gold medalist(s)	1st place, gold medalist(s)	1st place, gold medalist(s)		3rd place, bronze medalist(s)					1st place, gold medalist(s)	1st place, gold medalist(s)		2nd place, silver medalist(s)		
Women's	63 kg	3rd place, bronze medalist(s)		1st place, gold medalist(s)			2nd place, silver medalist(s)	1st place, gold medalist(s)	3rd place, bronze medalist(s)	1st place, gold medalist(s)	1st place, gold medalist(s)		3rd place, bronze medalist(s)					1st place, gold medalist(s)			2nd place, silver medalist(s)	3rd place, bronze medalist(s)	
Women's	70 kg	2nd place, silver medalist(s)		3rd place, bronze medalist(s)			1st place, gold medalist(s)	1st place, gold medalist(s)	1st place, gold medalist(s)	1st place, gold medalist(s)			3rd place, bronze medalist(s)				3rd place, bronze medalist(s)	2nd place, silver medalist(s)	2nd place, silver medalist(s)		2nd place, silver medalist(s)	3rd place, bronze medalist(s)	
Women's	78 kg	3rd place, bronze medalist(s)					1st place, gold medalist(s)	1st place, gold medalist(s)	3rd place, bronze medalist(s)	1st place, gold medalist(s)	1st place, gold medalist(s)					3rd place, bronze medalist(s)		2nd place, silver medalist(s)	3rd place, bronze medalist(s)		2nd place, silver medalist(s)	1st place, gold medalist(s)	
Women's	+78 kg	3rd place, bronze medalist(s)	2nd place, silver medalist(s)	1st place, gold medalist(s)		1st place, gold medalist(s)	2nd place, silver medalist(s)	3rd place, bronze medalist(s)		2nd place, silver medalist(s)							3rd place, bronze medalist(s)	1st place, gold medalist(s)			2nd place, silver medalist(s)	1st place, gold medalist(s)	

== Best results by event and nation (1979-1997) ==
Event		(Algeria) ALG	(Croatia) CRO	(Egypt) EGY	(Spain) ESP	(France) FRA	(Greece) GRE	(Italy) ITA	(Morocco) MAR	(Slovenia) SLO	(Syria) SYR	(Tunisia) TUN	(Turkey) TUR	(Socialist Federal Republic of Yugoslavia) YUG
Men's
Men's	60 kg	3rd place, bronze medalist(s)			3rd place, bronze medalist(s)	1st place, gold medalist(s)		1st place, gold medalist(s)	3rd place, bronze medalist(s)			2nd place, silver medalist(s)	2nd place, silver medalist(s)	2nd place, silver medalist(s)
Men's	65 kg	1st place, gold medalist(s)		3rd place, bronze medalist(s)	2nd place, silver medalist(s)	1st place, gold medalist(s)		2nd place, silver medalist(s)			2nd place, silver medalist(s)		1st place, gold medalist(s)	3rd place, bronze medalist(s)
Men's	71 kg	3rd place, bronze medalist(s)			2nd place, silver medalist(s)	1st place, gold medalist(s)		1st place, gold medalist(s)	3rd place, bronze medalist(s)			3rd place, bronze medalist(s)	3rd place, bronze medalist(s)	1st place, gold medalist(s)
Men's	78 kg			3rd place, bronze medalist(s)	2nd place, silver medalist(s)	1st place, gold medalist(s)	3rd place, bronze medalist(s)	1st place, gold medalist(s)	3rd place, bronze medalist(s)			3rd place, bronze medalist(s)	3rd place, bronze medalist(s)	3rd place, bronze medalist(s)
Men's	86 kg		3rd place, bronze medalist(s)	2nd place, silver medalist(s)	2nd place, silver medalist(s)	1st place, gold medalist(s)	3rd place, bronze medalist(s)	1st place, gold medalist(s)				3rd place, bronze medalist(s)		1st place, gold medalist(s)
Men's	95 kg		3rd place, bronze medalist(s)	3rd place, bronze medalist(s)	2nd place, silver medalist(s)	1st place, gold medalist(s)	3rd place, bronze medalist(s)	1st place, gold medalist(s)	3rd place, bronze medalist(s)	2nd place, silver medalist(s)		2nd place, silver medalist(s)		2nd place, silver medalist(s)
Men's	+95 kg			1st place, gold medalist(s)	2nd place, silver medalist(s)	1st place, gold medalist(s)	3rd place, bronze medalist(s)	3rd place, bronze medalist(s)	2nd place, silver medalist(s)			3rd place, bronze medalist(s)	2nd place, silver medalist(s)	1st place, gold medalist(s)
Women's
Women's	48 kg				3rd place, bronze medalist(s)	1st place, gold medalist(s)							3rd place, bronze medalist(s)	2nd place, silver medalist(s)
Women's	52 kg	2nd place, silver medalist(s)			3rd place, bronze medalist(s)	1st place, gold medalist(s)		3rd place, bronze medalist(s)						
Women's	56 kg	3rd place, bronze medalist(s)				1st place, gold medalist(s)		2nd place, silver medalist(s)				3rd place, bronze medalist(s)		
Women's	61 kg				1st place, gold medalist(s)	2nd place, silver medalist(s)						3rd place, bronze medalist(s)	3rd place, bronze medalist(s)	
Women's	66 kg					2nd place, silver medalist(s)		1st place, gold medalist(s)					3rd place, bronze medalist(s)	3rd place, bronze medalist(s)
Women's	72 kg				3rd place, bronze medalist(s)	1st place, gold medalist(s)		2nd place, silver medalist(s)					3rd place, bronze medalist(s)	
Women's	+72 kg			2nd place, silver medalist(s)		1st place, gold medalist(s)		3rd place, bronze medalist(s)						3rd place, bronze medalist(s)

== Best results by event and nation (1971-1975) ==
Event		(Egypt) EGY	(Spain) ESP	(France) FRA	(Italy) ITA	(Tunisia) TUN	(Turkey) TUR	(Socialist Federal Republic of Yugoslavia) YUG
Men's
Men's	63 kg			1st place, gold medalist(s)	1st place, gold medalist(s)		3rd place, bronze medalist(s)	2nd place, silver medalist(s)
Men's	70 kg		3rd place, bronze medalist(s)	1st place, gold medalist(s)	1st place, gold medalist(s)		2nd place, silver medalist(s)	3rd place, bronze medalist(s)
Men's	80 kg	3rd place, bronze medalist(s)	2nd place, silver medalist(s)				3rd place, bronze medalist(s)	1st place, gold medalist(s)
Men's	93 kg		3rd place, bronze medalist(s)	3rd place, bronze medalist(s)	2nd place, silver medalist(s)	3rd place, bronze medalist(s)	2nd place, silver medalist(s)	1st place, gold medalist(s)
Men's	+93 kg	3rd place, bronze medalist(s)	1st place, gold medalist(s)	2nd place, silver medalist(s)	1st place, gold medalist(s)		3rd place, bronze medalist(s)	2nd place, silver medalist(s)
