= Francesco Scuderi =

Francesco Scuderi may refer to:

- Francesco Scuderi (athlete)
- Francesco Scuderi (wrestler)
