= Scuderi =

Scuderi is a surname. Notable people with the surname include:

- Francesco Scuderi (athlete) (born 1977), Italian sprinter
- Francesco Scuderi (wrestler) (born 1949), Italian wrestler
- Giovanni Scuderi (born 1935), Italian politician
- Joe Scuderi (born 1968), Australian cricketer
- Rob Scuderi (born 1978), American ice hockey player
- Sara Scuderi (1906–1987), Italian opera singer

== See also ==
- Mademoiselle de Scuderi, novella
- Scuderi engine, a combustion engine
