= Morocco at the 1968 Summer Olympics =

- IOC code: MAR
- NOC: Moroccan Olympic Committee

in Mexico City
- Medals: Gold 0 Silver 0 Bronze 0 Total 0

Summer Olympics appearances (overview)
- 1960; 1964; 1968; 1972; 1976; 1980; 1984; 1988; 1992; 1996; 2000; 2004; 2008; 2012; 2016; 2020; 2024

Morocco competed at the 1968 Summer Olympics in Mexico City, Mexico. 25 competitors (25 men and 0 women) took part in 14 events in 4 sports.

== Athletics ==
Event	Gymnast	Rank
Men's 100 metres	Hassan El-Mech	eliminated in 1st round (heat 7)
Men's 200 metres	Hassan El-Mech	DNS
Men's 400 metres	Omar Ghizlat	eliminated in 1st round (heat 8)
Men's 1500 metres	Hamadi Haddou aka Jaddour Haddou	12th in Semifinal 1
Men's 5000 metres	Larbi Oukada	DNS
Men's 3000 metres steeplechase	Larbi Oukada	eliminated in 1st round
Men's shot put	Lahcen Samsam Akka	DNS
Men's discus throw	Lahcen Samsam Akka	DNS
Men's javelin throw	Lahcen Samsam Akka	DNS

== Basketball ==
Team: Abdeljabbar Belgnaoui, Mohammed Alaoui, Abdel Wahed Ben Siamar Mimun, Abderrahmane Sebbar, Abderraouf Laghrissi, Belcaïd Allal, Farouk Diouri, Fathallah Bouazzaoui, Khalil El-Yamani, Moukhtar Sayed, Moulay Ahmed Riadh, Noureddine Cherradi - 16th

== Boxing ==
Men's light flyweight

- Tahar Aziz (=9th)

Men's flyweight

- Boujemaa Hilmann (=17th)

Men's featherweight

- Mohamed Sourour (=9th)

Men's welterweight

- Mohamed Bouchara (=17th)

Men's middleweight

- Lahcen Ahidous (=16th)

== Wrestling ==
Men's Greco-Roman flyweight (52 kg)

- Mohamed Karmous (eliminated in 2nd round)

Men's Greco-Roman bantamweight (57 kg)

- Khalifa Karouane (eliminated in 2nd round)

Men's Greco-Roman featherweight (63 kg)

- Rahal Mahassine (eliminated in 2nd round)

Men's Greco-Roman lightweight (70 kg)

- Mohamed Moukrim Ben Mansour (eliminated)
