= Salloum =

Salloum may refer to:

== People with the surname Salloum ==
- Abdullah Al-Salloum (born 1981), Kuwaiti economist
- Fawzi Salloum (born 1943), Syrian wrestler
- Habeeb Salloum (1924–2019), Canadian author, of Arab heritage
- Jackie Salloum, American filmmaker, of Arab heritage
- Jayce Salloum (born 1958), Canadian multidisciplinary artist
- Maximos Salloum (1920–2004), Lebanese Catholic Archbishop in Israel

== People with the given name Salloum ==
- Salloum Mokarzel (1881–1952), Lebanese American publicist and intellectual
- Salloum Kaysar, Lebanese cyclist

== See also ==
- Sallum, a town in Egypt, near the border of Libya
