= BKK Radnički =

Basketball club in Belgrade, Serbia

Radnički Beograd
- Nickname: Krstaši (The Crusaders)
- Founded: 7 June 1945; 81 years ago
- History: BKK Radnički; 1945–present
- Location: Belgrade, Serbia
- Team colors: Red, Blue and White
- Championships: 1 National Championship; 1 National Cup
- Website: bkkradnicki.rs
Home	Away

Beogradski košarkaški klub Radnički (Serbian Cyrillic: Београдски кошаркашки клуб Раднички), commonly referred to as Radnički Beograd, is a men's professional basketball club based in Belgrade, Serbia. The club plays in the KLS.

== History ==
The club was founded on 7 June 1945 in the Belgrade's neighborhood of Crveni Krst, which is where their nickname krstaši (the Crusaders) comes from. Radnički achieved the biggest success during the 1970s, when the generation coached by Slobodan Ivković won the title of Yugoslav League champion in 1973. The club also won a Yugoslav Cup in 1976, and reached another cup final in 1978.

During the 1970s, Radnički also had good results in continental competitions. In 1974, they reached the semi-finals of the FIBA European Champions Cup, where they were stopped by reigning European champions, Ignis Varese. In 1977, Radnički reached the finals of a FIBA European Cup Winners' Cup where they lost to Forst Cantù by a single point margin, 86–87.

== Sponsorship naming ==
Radnički has had several denominations through the years due to its sponsorship:

- Radnički FOB: N/A
- Radnički LMK: N/A
- Radnički CIP: 1996–1997
- Radnički Jugopetrol: 1999–2002

== Home arenas ==
- Šumice Hall
- Slobodan Piva Ivković Hall (2000–present)

== Players ==
=== Current roster ===
Note: Flags indicate national team eligibility at FIBA-sanctioned events. Players may hold other non-FIBA nationalities not displayed.

BKK Radnički roster
Players
Coaches

Pos.	No.	Nat.	Name	Ht.	Wt.	Age
F	1	(Serbia)	Dukić, Janko	2.00 m (6 ft 7 in)	89 kg (196 lb)	20 – 11 February 2006
G/F	5	(Serbia)	Nedeljković, Aleksej (TW)	2.01 m (6 ft 7 in)	95 kg (209 lb)	18 – 5 May 2008
PG	6	(Serbia)	Todorić, Mateja	1.90 m (6 ft 3 in)		28 – 10 August 1998
G/F	7	(Serbia)	Božić, Andrej	1.95 m (6 ft 5 in)		18 – 19 February 2008
SG	8	(Serbia)	Pavlović, Novak (TW)	1.98 m (6 ft 6 in)		17 – 5 December 2008
G/F	9	(Serbia)	Dilparić, Petar	1.96 m (6 ft 5 in)	85 kg (187 lb)	24 – 27 May 2002
SG	11	(Serbia)	Bjelić, Andrej (TW)	1.94 m (6 ft 4 in)	87 kg (192 lb)	18 – 17 March 2008
F/C	13	(Serbia)	Lukić, Ognjen	2.03 m (6 ft 8 in)	88 kg (194 lb)	21 – 5 June 2005
F	14	(Serbia)	Avramović, Todor	2.03 m (6 ft 8 in)		16 – 17 April 2010
C	16	(Serbia)	Ðurić, Sava (TW)	2.11 m (6 ft 11 in)	105 kg (231 lb)	19 – 7 April 2007
F/C	17	(Serbia)	Birišić, Lazar	2.00 m (6 ft 7 in)	109 kg (240 lb)	16 – 10 February 2010
F/C	22	(Serbia)	Mijović, Milivoje	2.00 m (6 ft 7 in)	105 kg (231 lb)	34 – 18 December 1991
G	23	(Serbia)	Zarić, Niša	1.95 m (6 ft 5 in)		18 – 31 October 2008
F	28	(Serbia)	Bikić, Jovan	2.00 m (6 ft 7 in)	90 kg (198 lb)	18 – 15 January 2008
C	41	(Serbia)	Gagić, Đorđe	2.11 m (6 ft 11 in)	125 kg (276 lb)	35 – 28 December 1990
C	42	(Serbia)	Regoje, Matija	2.05 m (6 ft 9 in)		15–16 – Missing required parameter 1=month! 2010
F	62	(Serbia)	Stevanović, Marko	2.03 m (6 ft 8 in)		32 – 10 July 1994
PG	77	(Serbia)	Jovčić, Aleksandar	1.83 m (6 ft 0 in)		21 – 1 January 2005
G/F	95	(Serbia)	Mijailović, Strahinja	1.98 m (6 ft 6 in)	107 kg (236 lb)	18 – 1 January 2008

Head coach

- (Serbia) Stefan Atanacković

Assistant coach(es)

- (Serbia) Veljko Simović
- (Serbia) Marija Kesić
- (Serbia) Matija Stojšić
- (Serbia) Miljan Nićiforović
- (Serbia) Dragan Vaščanin
- (Serbia) Mateja Dunjić

Strength & conditioning coach(es)

- (Serbia) Aleksandar Rajković
- (Serbia) Igor Tomašević

Team manager

- (Serbia) Marko Boltić

Legend

- (C) Team captain
- Injured

- Roster
Updated: November 3, 2026

=== Depth chart ===
Pos.	Starting 5	Bench 1	Bench 2	Bench 3
C	Milivoje Mijović	Sava Đurić	Đorđe Gagić	Matija Regoje
PF	Marko Stevanović	Jovan Bikić	Lazar Birišić	Ognjen Lukić
SF	Aleksej Nedeljković	Andrej Božić	Janko Dukić	Todor Avramović
SG	Novak Pavlović	Andrej Bjelić	Petar Dilparić	Strahinja Mijailović
PG	Mateja Todorić	Niša Zarić	Aleksandar Jovčić

== Coaches ==
=== Head coaches ===
- (Socialist Federal Republic of Yugoslavia) Miodrag Stefanović
- (Socialist Federal Republic of Yugoslavia) Ranko Žeravica (1954–1960)
- (Socialist Federal Republic of Yugoslavia) Dragoljub Pljakić (1965–1967)
- (Socialist Federal Republic of Yugoslavia) Slobodan Ivković (1967–1976)
- (Socialist Federal Republic of Yugoslavia) Milan Vasojević (1976–1978)
- (Socialist Federal Republic of Yugoslavia) Nemanja Đurić (1978-1979)
- (Socialist Federal Republic of Yugoslavia) Bratislav Đorđević (1979–1981)
- (Socialist Federal Republic of Yugoslavia) Božidar Maljković (1981–1982)
- (Socialist Federal Republic of Yugoslavia) Dušan Ivković (1982–1984)
- (Socialist Federal Republic of Yugoslavia) Marijan Novović (1985–1987)
- (Socialist Federal Republic of Yugoslavia) Slobodan Ivković (1989–1990)
- (Socialist Federal Republic of Yugoslavia) Zlatan Tomić (1990–1992)
- (Federal Republic of Yugoslavia) Dragoljub Pljakić (1992–1993)
- (Federal Republic of Yugoslavia) Slobodan Ivković (1993–1994)
- (Federal Republic of Yugoslavia) Jovica Antonić (1994–1995)
- (Federal Republic of Yugoslavia) Aleksandar Petrović
- (Federal Republic of Yugoslavia) Velimir Gašić (1997–1998)
- (Federal Republic of Yugoslavia) Rajko Toroman (1998–1999)
- (Federal Republic of Yugoslavia) Boško Đokić (1999)
- (Federal Republic of Yugoslavia) Duško Vujošević (1999–2001)
- (Federal Republic of Yugoslavia) Miroslav Nikolić (2001–2002)
- (Federal Republic of Yugoslavia) Dejan Srzić (2003–2004)
- (Federal Republic of Yugoslavia) Miodrag Rajković (2004–2005)
- (Serbia) Dragan Nikolić (2009–2012)
- (Serbia) Marko Ičelić (2012–2013)
- (Serbia) Milan Mitrović (2013)
- (Serbia) Branko Milisavljević (2015–2017)
- (Serbia) Goran Vučković (2018–2020)
- (Serbia) Nebojša Knežević (2020–2021)
- (Serbia) Marko Boltić (2021–2026)
- (Serbia) Stefan Atanacković (2026–present)

== Hall of Famers and contributors ==
FIBA Hall of Fame

Radnički Hall of Famers
Coaches
Name	Position	Tenure	Inducted
Ranko Žeravica	Head coach	1954–1960	2007
Dušan Ivković	Head coach	1982–1984	2017
Milan Vasojević	Head coach	1976–1978	2022

50 Greatest EuroLeague Contributors

Radnički EuroLeague Contributors
Coaches
Name	Position	Tenure	Inducted
Božidar Maljković	Head coach	1980–1982	2008
Dušan Ivković	Head coach	1982–1984	2008

== Trophies and awards ==
=== Trophies ===
- Yugoslav League (1st-tier; defunct)
  - Winners (1): 1972–73
- Yugoslav Cup (defunct)
  - Winners (1): 1975–76
- Yugoslav B League (2nd-tier; defunct)
  - Winner (1): 1983–84
- Second League of Serbia (2nd-tier)
  - Winner (1): 2010–11
- First Regional League of Serbia (3rd-tier)
  - Winner (2): 2009–10, 2018–19
- FIBA Saporta Cup (defunct)
  - Runners-up (1): 1976–77

=== Awards ===
- FIBA European Cup Winners' Cup Finals Top Scorer
  - (Socialist Federal Republic of Yugoslavia) Srećko Jarić (1) – 1977

== Notable players ==
Note: Flags indicate national team eligibility at FIBA-sanctioned events. Players may hold other non-FIBA nationalities not displayed.

Criteria

To appear in this section a player must have either:

- Set a club record or won an individual award while at the club
- Played at least one official international match for their national team at any time
- Played at least one official NBA match at any time.

- (Serbia) Darko Balaban
- (Serbia) Nemanja Bezbradica
- Petar Božić
- (Serbia) Dragutin Čermak
- (Serbia) Miroljub Damnjanović
- (Serbia) Dušan Ivković
- (Serbia) Slobodan Ivković
- (Serbia) Marko Jarić
- (Serbia) Srećko Jarić
- (Serbia) Ranko Žeravica
- (Serbia) Zoran Jovanović
- (Serbia) Slađan Stojković
- (Serbia) Aleksandar Nađfeji
- (Serbia) Stevan Nađfeji
- (Serbia) Milovan Tasić
- (Serbia) Nemanja Đurić
- (Serbia) Luka Pavićević
- (Serbia) Dragoslav Ražnatović
- (Serbia) Dragiša Šarić
- (Serbia) Vanja Plisnić
- (Serbia) Dragi Ivković
- (Serbia) Milun Marović
- (Serbia) Dragan Vučinić
- (Serbia) Zoran Prelević
- (Serbia) Branko Banjanin
- (Serbia) Mile Stanković
- (Serbia) Dušan Živanović
- (Serbia) Pavle Živanović
- (Serbia) Dragan Hranisavljević
- (Serbia) Darko Petronijević
- (Serbia) Goran Mastilović
- (Serbia) Ivan Šarac
- (Serbia) Goran Skoko
- (Serbia) Saša Radunović
- (Serbia) Mile Đorđević
- (Serbia) Vladimir Dragutinović
- (Serbia) (Greece) Milan Tomić
- (Serbia) Aleksandar Čubrilo
- (Serbia) Dušan Vukčević
- (Serbia) Goran Ćakić
- (Serbia) Žarko Vučurović
- (Bosnia and Herzegovina) (Serbia) Dragan Tubak
- (Serbia) Marko Čakarević
- (Serbia) Mlađen Šljivančanin
- (Serbia) Branko Sinđelić
- (Serbia) Nikola Bjegović
- (Serbia) Dušan Trivalić
- (Serbia) Dušan Zupančić
- (Serbia) Dragoljub Zmijanac
- (Serbia) Igor Perović
- (Serbia) Uroš Lučić
- (Serbia) Dušan Đorđević
- (Serbia) Bogdan Riznić
- (Serbia) Nebojša Bogdanović
- (Austria) Bogić Vujošević

== International record ==
Season	Achievement	Notes
FIBA European Champions Cup
1973–74	Semifinals	Eliminated by Ignis Varese, 161–175 (1–1)
FIBA Saporta Cup
1976–77	Runners-up	Defeated by Forst Cantù, 86–87
1978–79	Quarterfinals	3rd in Group A with FC Barcelona, Sinudyne Bologna, and UBSC Wien (3–3)
1999–00	Round of 32	Defeated by Darüşşafaka, 137–141 (1–1)
FIBA Korać Cup
1998–99	Round of 16	Eliminated by Panionios, 145–169 (0–2)
1979–80	Second round	Eliminated by Hapoel Tel Aviv, 165–166 (1–1)
1992–93	Second round	Eliminated by Stroitel Kharkov, 0–4 (0–2)
