= Jan Neckář =

Czech wrestler (1946–2018)

Personal information
- Nationality: Czech
- Born: 28 November 1946
- Died: 16 February 2018 (aged 71)

Sport
- Sport: Wrestling

Jan Neckář (28 November 1946 – 16 February 2018) was a Czech wrestler. He competed in the men's Greco-Roman 57 kg at the 1972 Summer Olympics.
