= Marko Jarić =

Serbian basketball player (born 1978)

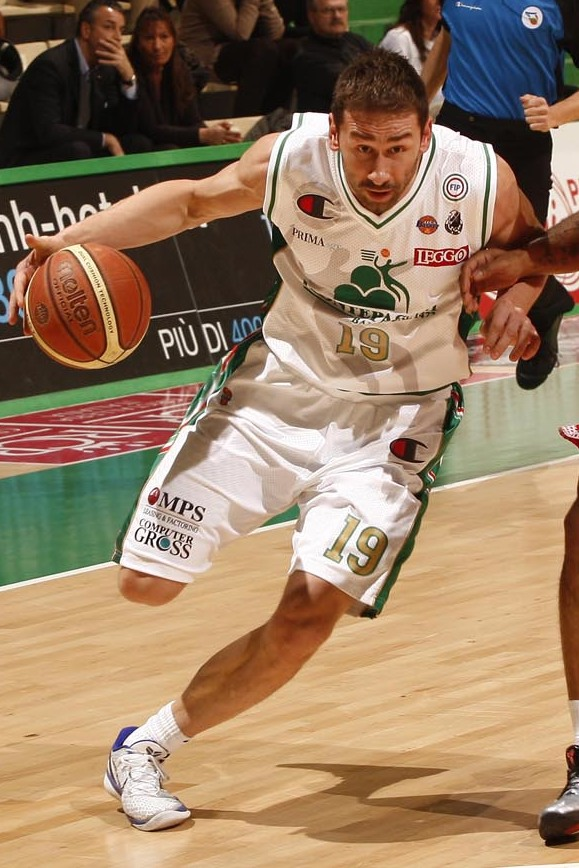
- Jarić in 2011

Personal information
- Born: 12 October 1978 (age 48) Belgrade, SR Serbia, SFR Yugoslavia
- Listed height: 6 ft 7 in (2.01 m)
- Listed weight: 224 lb (102 kg)

Career information
- NBA draft: 2000: 2nd round, 30th overall pick
- Drafted by: Los Angeles Clippers
- Playing career: 1995–2011
- Position: Shooting guard
- Number: 8, 10, 19, 20, 55

Career history
- 1995–1996: Radnički Belgrade
- 1996–1998: Peristeri
- 1998–2000: Fortitudo Bologna
- 2000–2002: Virtus Bologna
- 2002–2005: Los Angeles Clippers
- 2005–2008: Minnesota Timberwolves
- 2008–2009: Memphis Grizzlies
- 2009–2010: Real Madrid
- 2011: Montepaschi Siena

Career highlights
- EuroLeague champion (2001); All-EuroLeague First Team (2002); 3× Italian League champion (2000, 2001, 2011); 2× Italian Cup winner (2001, 2002); Italian League All-Star Game (2000); Italian Supercup winner (1998)
- Stats at NBA.com
- Stats at Basketball Reference

Marko Jarić (Serbian Cyrillic: Марко Јарић, pronounced [mâːrko jǎːritɕ]; Greek: Μάρκο Γιάριτς, romanized: Marko Yiarits; born 12 October 1978) is a Serbian former professional basketball player. Standing at 2.01 m (6 ft 7 in), he mainly played the point guard position. He also represented the senior FR Yugoslavian national basketball team internationally. Jarić was an All-EuroLeague First Team member in 2002.

== Early life ==
Jarić was born in Belgrade, SR Serbia, SFR Yugoslavia, the son of Srećko Jarić, a well-known Yugoslav professional basketball player, who played as a point guard for Radnički Belgrade, and was regarded by head basketball coach Dušan Ivković as, the "biggest talent that he ever had under his charge". Jarić began playing basketball with the youth teams of the Serbian club Red Star Belgrade.

== Professional career ==
=== Europe ===
Jarić began his professional career with Radnički Belgrade in the 1995–96 season, before moving to Greek Basket League club Peristeri. With Peristeri, he played two seasons in the European-wide 3rd tier level FIBA Korać Cup. He then spent the next 4 seasons playing in Europe's top-tier level EuroLeague, with the Italian clubs Fortitudo Bologna and Virtus Bologna.

He became the first player ever to win back-to-back Italian League championships, on two teams. He won the Italian League championship in 2000, with Fortitudo Bologna, and in 2001, with Virtus Bologna.

=== NBA ===
Jarić was selected as the 30th overall draft pick, by the Los Angeles Clippers, in the 2000 NBA draft. After playing in 3 NBA seasons with the Clippers, he signed a six-year, $40 million contract and subsequently was traded in a sign-and-trade to the Minnesota Timberwolves, on 12 August 2005, along with Lionel Chalmers, by the Clippers, in exchange for Sam Cassell and a future first-round draft pick in 2012 . He was traded to the Grizzlies, on 26 June 2008, in an eight-player deal, involving rookie shooting guard O. J. Mayo, and rookie power forward Kevin Love.

For the 2009–10 NBA season, Jarić and the Memphis Grizzlies, mutually agreed that Jarić would not attend the team's training camp, or any of their preseason games. Jarić was granted permission to seek a new team, and a possible contract buyout, for the remaining 2 years and $15 million of his contract. Jarić's final NBA game was played on April 15, 2009, in a 98–90 victory over the Atlanta Hawks. In his final game, he played for 23 minutes and recorded 5 rebounds, 2 assists, 2 steals but no points.

=== Back to Europe ===
After securing his release from the NBA's Memphis Grizzlies, Jarić then signed with Spanish Liga ACB club Real Madrid, on 22 December 2009. On 14 January 2011, he signed with the Italian LBA club Montepaschi Siena, through the end of the 2010–11 season.

=== NBA comeback attempt ===
In October 2012, Jarić signed with the NBA's Chicago Bulls. However, he was waived on 24 October. In September 2013, he signed with the Brooklyn Nets. However, he was waived on 15 October. He then retired from playing professional basketball.

== National team career ==
=== FR Yugoslavia junior national team ===
As a junior FR Yugoslavia national team player, Jarić won the gold medal at the 1998 FIBA Europe Under-20 Championship.

=== FR Yugoslavia senior national team ===
As a member of the senior FR Yugoslavia national basketball team, Jarić won gold medals at both the 2001 EuroBasket and the 2002 FIBA World Championship. He also played with them at the 2003 EuroBasket and the 2005 EuroBasket. He represented the senior Serbian national basketball team at the 2007 EuroBasket.

== Career statistics ==
Legend
GP	Games played	GS	Games started	MPG	Minutes per game
FG%	Field-goal percentage	3P%	3-point field-goal percentage	FT%	Free-throw percentage
RPG	Rebounds per game	APG	Assists per game	SPG	Steals per game
BPG	Blocks per game	PPG	Points per game	PIR	Performance index rating
**Bold**	Career high

†	Denotes season in which Jarić won the EuroLeague

=== NBA ===
==== Regular season ====
Year	Team	GP	GS	MPG	FG%	3P%	FT%	RPG	APG	SPG	BPG	PPG
2002–03	L.A. Clippers	66	12	20.9	.401	.319	.752	2.4	2.9	1.5	.2	7.4
2003–04	L.A. Clippers	58	50	30.3	.388	.340	.733	3.0	4.8	1.6	.3	8.5
2004–05	L.A. Clippers	50	41	**33.1**	.414	.371	.720	**3.2**	**6.1**	**1.7**	.3	**9.9**
2005–06	Minnesota	**75**	49	28.0	.399	.301	.688	3.1	3.9	1.4	.3	7.8
2006–07	Minnesota	70	13	22.2	.418	.376	**.761**	2.6	2.1	1.1	.2	5.3
2007–08	Minnesota	**75**	**56**	29.2	**.430**	.362	.742	3.0	4.1	1.3	**.4**	8.3
2008–09	Memphis	53	0	11.4	.331	**.393**	.707	1.2	1.4	.5	.2	2.6
**Career**		447	221	25.2	.404	.344	.730	2.7	3.6	1.3	.3	7.1

=== EuroLeague ===
Year	Team	GP	GS	MPG	FG%	3P%	FT%	RPG	APG	SPG	BPG	PPG	PIR
2000–01†	Bologna	**22**	16	**28.7**	.439	.309	.697	3.0	2.3	2.0	**.2**	10.4	10.2
2001–02	Bologna	21	**20**	28.2	**.482**	.268	.595	**4.3**	**2.5**	**2.2**	.1	**13.4**	**14.6**
2009–10	Real Madrid	12	10	25.8	.378	**.440**	.682	5.2	1.7	1.3	**.2**	7.1	7.7
2010–11	Montepaschi	12	3	12.5	.433	.158	**.750**	1.4	1.3	1.0	.0	5.1	3.9
**Career**		67	49	25.1	.448	.294	.656	3.3	2.1	1.8	.1	9.8	10.0

== Personal life ==
Jarić has an older sister named Tamara, and a younger brother named Nikola (b. 1987), who lives and plays basketball in Switzerland.

On 12 June 2008, Jarić became engaged to Brazilian supermodel Adriana Lima. The couple wed in Jackson Hole, Wyoming, USA, on Valentine's Day 2009. They have two daughters. The couple announced their separation on 2 May 2014, after five years of marriage. The divorce was finalized in March 2016.

Jarić also holds Greek citizenship, under the name Marko Latsis (Greek: Μάρκο Λάτσης), which was the name he played basketball under in Greece.

== See also ==
- List of Serbian NBA players
