= Rustam Kazakov =

Soviet wrestler (born 1947)

Medal record

Representing the Soviet Union

Men's wrestling

Olympic Games
Gold medal – first place	1972 Munich	57 kg

Rustem Kazakov (born 2 January 1947) is a Soviet former wrestler of Crimean Tatar heritage, Olympic Champion, born in Tashkent, Uzbek SSR and affiliated with VS Tashkent.

He competed at the 1972 Summer Olympics in Munich where he won a gold medal in Greco-Roman wrestling, the bantamweight class. He is also two times world champion in 1969 and 1971.
