= Hans-Jürgen Veil =

German wrestler (born 1946)

Medal record

Men's Greco-Roman wrestling

Representing West Germany

Olympic Games
Silver medal – second place	1972 Munich	57 kg

Hans-Jürgen Veil (born 2 December 1946 in Ludwigshafen) is a German former wrestler who competed in the 1972 Summer Olympics and in the 1976 Summer Olympics.
