= Jean Nakouzi =

Lebanese wrestler

Personal information
- Nationality: Lebanese
- Born: 19 May 1947 (age 79) Beirut, Lebanon

Sport
- Sport: Wrestling

Jean Nakouzi (born 19 May 1947) is a Lebanese wrestler. He competed in the men's Greco-Roman 57 kg at the 1968 Summer Olympics.
