= Ivan Kochergin =

Russian wrestler (1935–2015)

Medal record

Men's Greco-Roman wrestling

Representing the Soviet Union

Olympic Games
Bronze medal – third place	1968 Mexico City	57 kg

Ivan Vasilyevich Kochergin (Russian: Иван Васильевич Кочергин, 29 December 1935 – 30 May 2015) was a Russian wrestler who competed in the 1960 Summer Olympics and in the 1968 Summer Olympics.
