= Daniel Robin =

French wrestler (1943–2018)

Medal record

Representing France

Olympic Games

Men's Freestyle wrestling
Silver medal – second place	1968 Mexico City	Welterweight

Men's Greco-Roman wrestling
Silver medal – second place	1968 Mexico City	Welterweight

World Wrestling Championships

Men's Freestyle wrestling
Gold medal – first place	1967 New Delhi	Welterweight

European Wrestling Championships

Men's Freestyle wrestling
Gold medal – first place	1968 Skopje	Welterweight

Mediterranean Games

Men's Freestyle wrestling
Silver medal – second place	1971 İzmir	Welterweight

Men's Greco-Roman wrestling
Gold medal – first place	1971 İzmir	Welterweight

Men's Freestyle wrestling
Gold medal – first place	1967 Tunis	Welterweight

Men's Greco-Roman wrestling
Gold medal – first place	1967 Tunis	Welterweight

Daniel Robin (31 May 1943 – 23 May 2018) was a French wrestler who was inducted into the United World Wrestling Hall of Fame in 2012.

Robin was born in Bron, Rhône. He was Olympic silver medalist in both Freestyle wrestling and Greco-Roman wrestling in 1968, making a record as the first wrestler winning two silver medals at the same Olympic Games. Also competing at the 1972 Olympics, he won a gold medal at the 1967 World Wrestling Championships.

Robin continued his career among the wrestling circle and became the head coach for French national team, then vice-president of the French Wrestling Federation, and shifted to become a technical delegate for FILA and United World Wrestling. For the 2012 London Olympics organizing committee, Robin was named the director of the wrestling operations in 2010.

Daniel Robin died on 23 May 2018 in Longueuil, Quebec, Canada at the age of 74.
