= Milivoje Mijović =

Serbian basketball player

Radnički Beograd
- Position: Power forward
- League: KLS

Personal information
- Born: December 18, 1991 (age 34) Belgrade, Serbia
- Listed height: 2.00 m (6 ft 7 in)
- Listed weight: 105 kg (231 lb)

Career information
- NBA draft: 2013: undrafted
- Playing career: 2011–present

Career history
- 2011–2012: BKK Radnički
- 2012–2016: Rogaška Crystal
- 2016–2017: Kožuv
- 2017–2018: Mureș
- 2018: BK Levickí Patrioti
- 2018–2019: Levski Lukoil
- 2019–2020: GTK Gliwice
- 2020: Slodes
- 2020–2022: MKS Dąbrowa Górnicza
- 2022: Belfius Mons-Hainaut
- 2023-2024: SCM U Craiova
- 2024: Sokół Łańcut
- 2024-present: BKK Radnički

Milivoje Mijović (born December 18, 1991) is a Serbian professional basketball player who plays for BKK Radnički of the KLS.

He was born in Belgrade.
