= Alfredo López Arencibia =

Cuban trade unionist and typesetter (1894–1926)

Alfredo López Arencibia (1894 – 1926) was a Cuban labor leader and trade unionist. Born in Sagua la Grande, Cuba in 1894, he learned to be a typesetter and joined a trade union when he was young. Later, he took on larger roles as leader of the typographers trade union and the Federación Obrera de La Habana (FOH). (Note: "Labor Federation of Havana" in English) He was also involved in the founding of the Confederación Nacional Obrera de Cuba (CNOC). (Note: "National Working-Class Confederation of Cuba" in English)

Although he was influenced by anarchism and has even been described as a "anarquista unitario" or "unitarian anarchist", López took part in early Marxist-Lenininist reading circles. In 1925, he attended the Second and Third Workers Congresses in Cienfuegos and Camagüey, respectively.

In 1926, López was disappeared under the Machado dictatorship and assassinated at Castillo de Atarés.
