= Hartmut Puls =

German wrestler

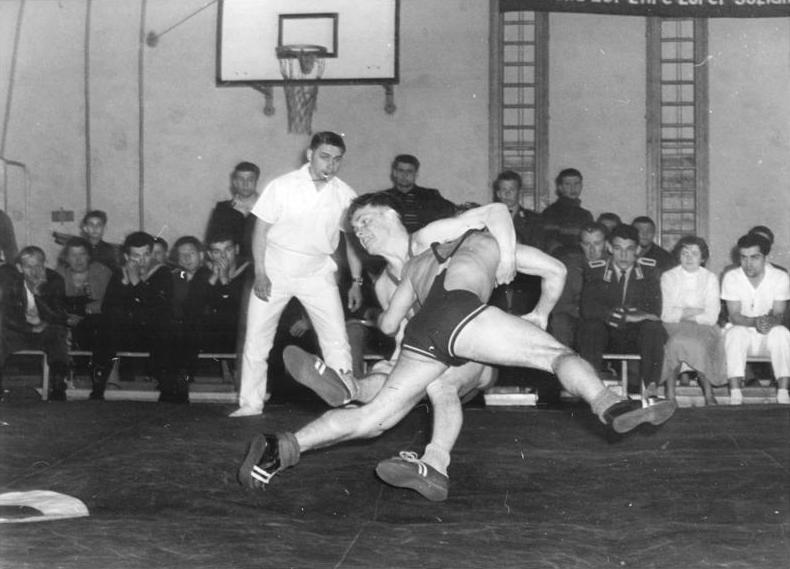
- Hartmut Puls (middle) in 1961

Personal information
- Nationality: German
- Born: 25 January 1945 (age 81) Chojnice, Poland

Sport
- Sport: Wrestling

Hartmut Puls (born 25 January 1945) is a German wrestler. He competed in the men's Greco-Roman 57 kg at the 1968 Summer Olympics.
