= Harald Hervig =

Norwegian sport wrestler

Harald Hervig (born 31 March 1948) was a Norwegian sport wrestler who competed in the 1972 Summer Olympics.

He was born in Oslo, and represented the sports club SK av 1909. He participated in the 57 kg weight class (bantamweight) in wrestling at the 1972 Summer Olympics, where he withdrew in the third round. He won a bronze medal in featherweight at the 1973 European Wrestling Championships, and took eleven national championships (ten in featherweight) between 1969 and 1880.
