= Jørn Krogsgaard =

Danish wrestler

Personal information
- Nationality: Danish
- Born: 18 December 1946 (age 79) Copenhagen, Denmark

Sport
- Sport: Wrestling

Jørn Krogsgaard (born 18 December 1946) is a Danish wrestler. He competed in the men's Greco-Roman 57 kg at the 1972 Summer Olympics.
