= Rodolfo Guerra =

Mexican wrestler

Personal information
- Born: 17 April 1942 (age 84) El Oro, Mexico

Sport
- Sport: Wrestling

Rodolfo Guerra (born 17 April 1942) is a Mexican wrestler. He competed in the men's Greco-Roman 57 kg at the 1968 Summer Olympics.
