= Arthur Spaenhoven =

Belgian wrestler

Personal information
- Nationality: Belgian
- Born: 9 April 1934 (age 92) Hoboken, Belgium

Sport
- Sport: Wrestling

Arthur Spaenhoven (9 April 1934 – 2 April 1996) was a Belgian wrestler. He competed in the men's Greco-Roman 57 kg at the 1968 Summer Olympics.
