= Kaya Özcan =

Turkish wrestler

Personal information
- Nationality: Turkish
- Born: 1945 (age 80–81) Doğubeyazıt, Turkey

Sport
- Sport: Wrestling

Kaya Özcan (born 1945) is a Turkish wrestler. He competed in the men's Greco-Roman 57 kg at the 1968 Summer Olympics.
