= Milenko Kersnić =

Slovenian gymnast (born 1946)

- Миленко Керснић
- Born: 21 June 1946 (age 80) Ljubljana, Federal People's Republic of Yugoslavia
- Height: 1.66 m (5 ft 5 in)

Gymnastics career
- Discipline: Men's artistic gymnastics
- Country represented: Yugoslavia
Medal record
Men's artistic gymnastics
Representing Socialist Federal Republic of Yugoslavia
Mediterranean Games
Gold medal – first place	1971 İzmir	Team
Silver medal – second place	1967 Tunis	Team
Silver medal – second place	1967 Tunis	Vault
Silver medal – second place	1971 İzmir	Pommel horse
Bronze medal – third place	1971 İzmir	All-around
Bronze medal – third place	1971 İzmir	Parallel bars

Milenko Kersnić (born 21 June 1946) is a Slovenian gymnast. He competed at the 1968 Summer Olympics and the 1972 Summer Olympics.
