= Per Lindholm =

Swedish wrestler

Personal information
- Full name: Per Göran Christer Lindholm
- Nationality: Swedish
- Born: 13 June 1953 (age 71); Hässleholm, Skåne County, Sweden

Sport
- Sport: Wrestling

Per Lindholm (born 13 June 1953) is a Swedish former wrestler who competed in the 1972 Summer Olympics and in the 1976 Summer Olympics. He was born in Hässleholm.
