= Ali Lachkar =

Moroccan wrestler

Personal information
- Nationality: Moroccan
- Born: 12 October 1949 (age 75)

Sport
- Sport: Wrestling

Ali Lachkar (born 12 October 1949) is a Moroccan wrestler. He competed at the 1972 Summer Olympics, the 1976 Summer Olympics and the 1984 Summer Olympics.
