= Ernst Hack =

Austrian wrestler

Ernst Hack (16 December 1946 in Ternberg – 1 June 1986 in Gramastetten) was an Austrian wrestler who competed in the 1972 Summer Olympics.
