= Alfredo López (wrestler) =

Mexican wrestler (born 1947)

Personal information
- Nationality: Mexican
- Born: 8 December 1947 (age 78)

Sport
- Sport: Wrestling

Alfredo López (born 8 December 1947) is a Mexican wrestler. He competed in the men's Greco-Roman 57 kg at the 1972 Summer Olympics.
