= Castillo de Atarés =

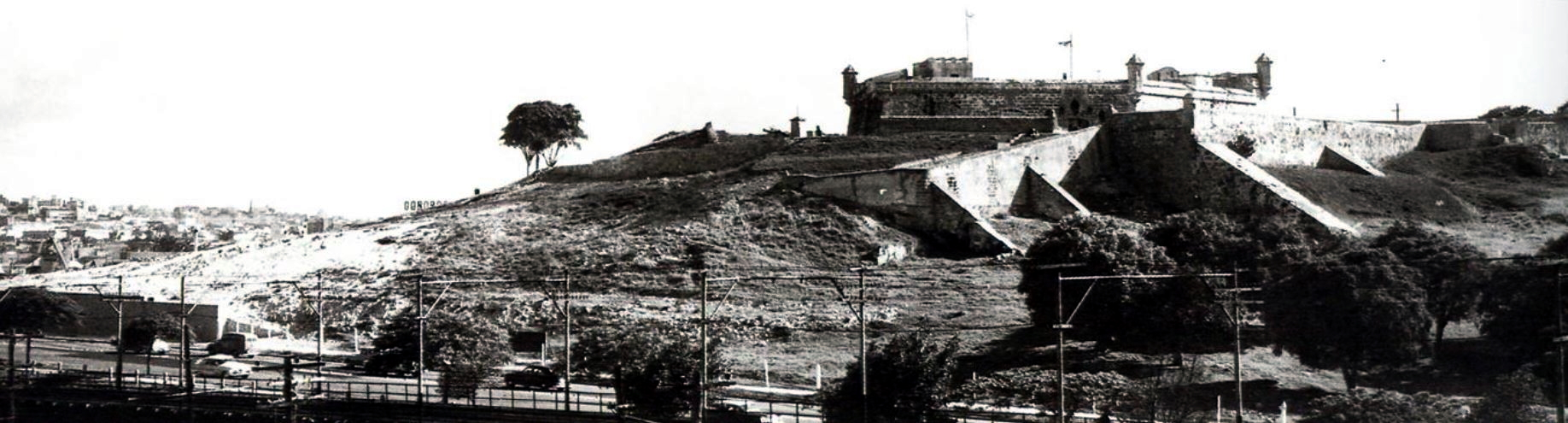
- Castillo de Santo Domingo de Atarés in the early 20th century

General information
- Type: Defense
- Location: Havana, Cuba
- Coordinates: 23.120240788139256°N 82.36137246431247°W
- Construction started: 1763
- Inaugurated: 1767

Technical details
- Structural system: Load bearing
- Material: Masonry

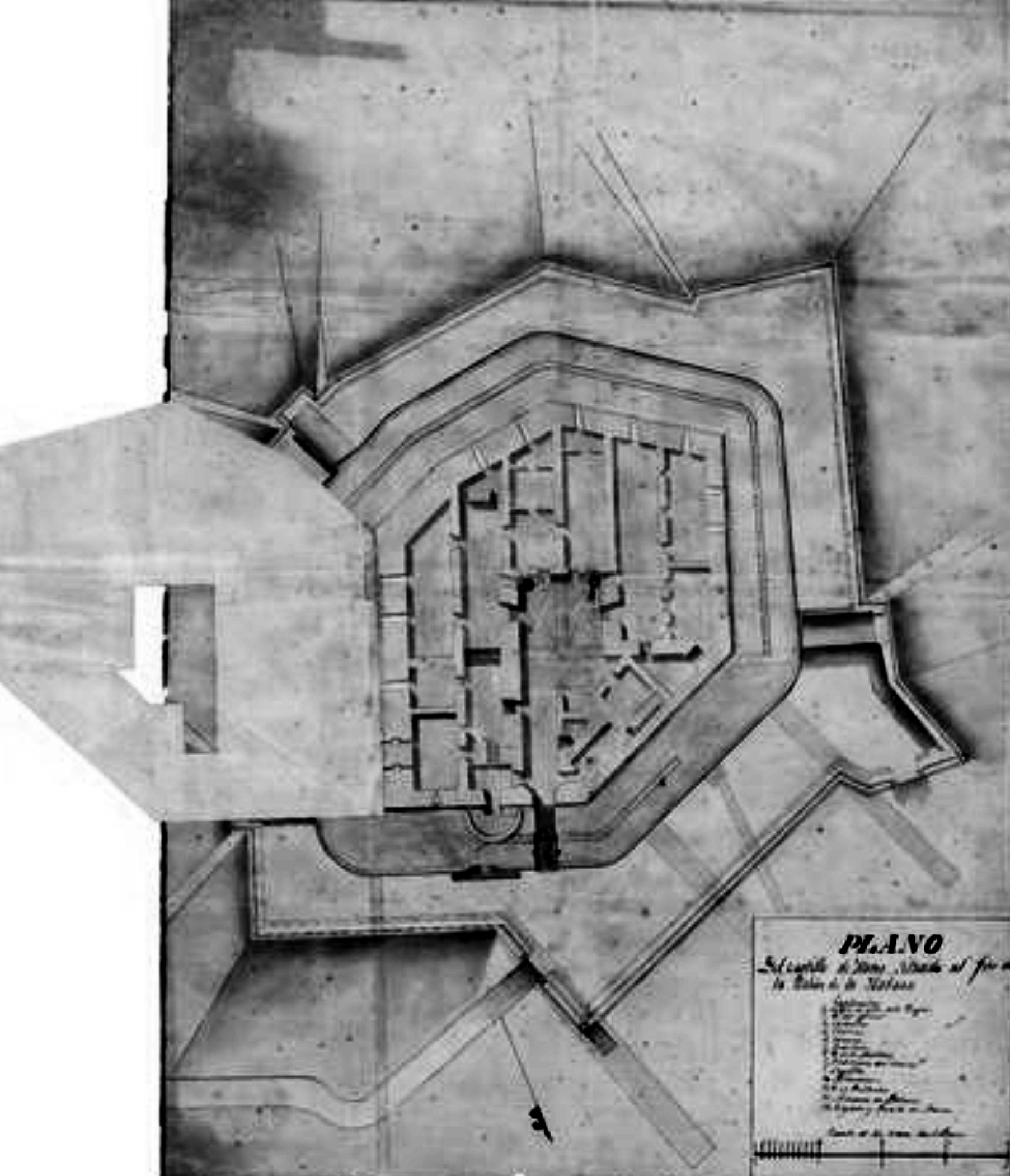
Plan of Castillo de Atarés, 1823

The Castillo de Santo Domingo de Atarés is a small hexagonal hilltop fort in Havana built in 1767. Work commenced in 1763, around the same time as initial work on Castillo del Príncipe. It is located on La loma de Soto above the harbour. In 1982, the fort was inscribed on the UNESCO World Heritage List, along with other historic sites in Old Havana, because of the city's importance in the European conquest of the New World, its fortifications, and its unique architecture.

== History ==
The Castillo de Santo Domingo de Atarés was part of the second colonial defensive system of Havana that was promoted after the period of English rule over the city. The Castillo de Atarés is an irregular hexagon. It does not have bastions, but it has hexagonal sentry boxes at its vertices. In addition, it is surrounded by a perimeter moat, it was built with stone blocks. Despite being a military fortress, the Castle of Santo Domingo de Atarés never entered combat. However, it was bombed by forces of the Cuban Army and Navy, in 1933, when it was occupied by the disaffected Ramón Grau San Martín government. Inside there is a small central parade ground, six vaults, an armory, and several warehouses that once housed food and supplies. The platforms for the heavy artillery are on the roof, from where they had a fairly wide range over the bay and the city.

== Gallery ==
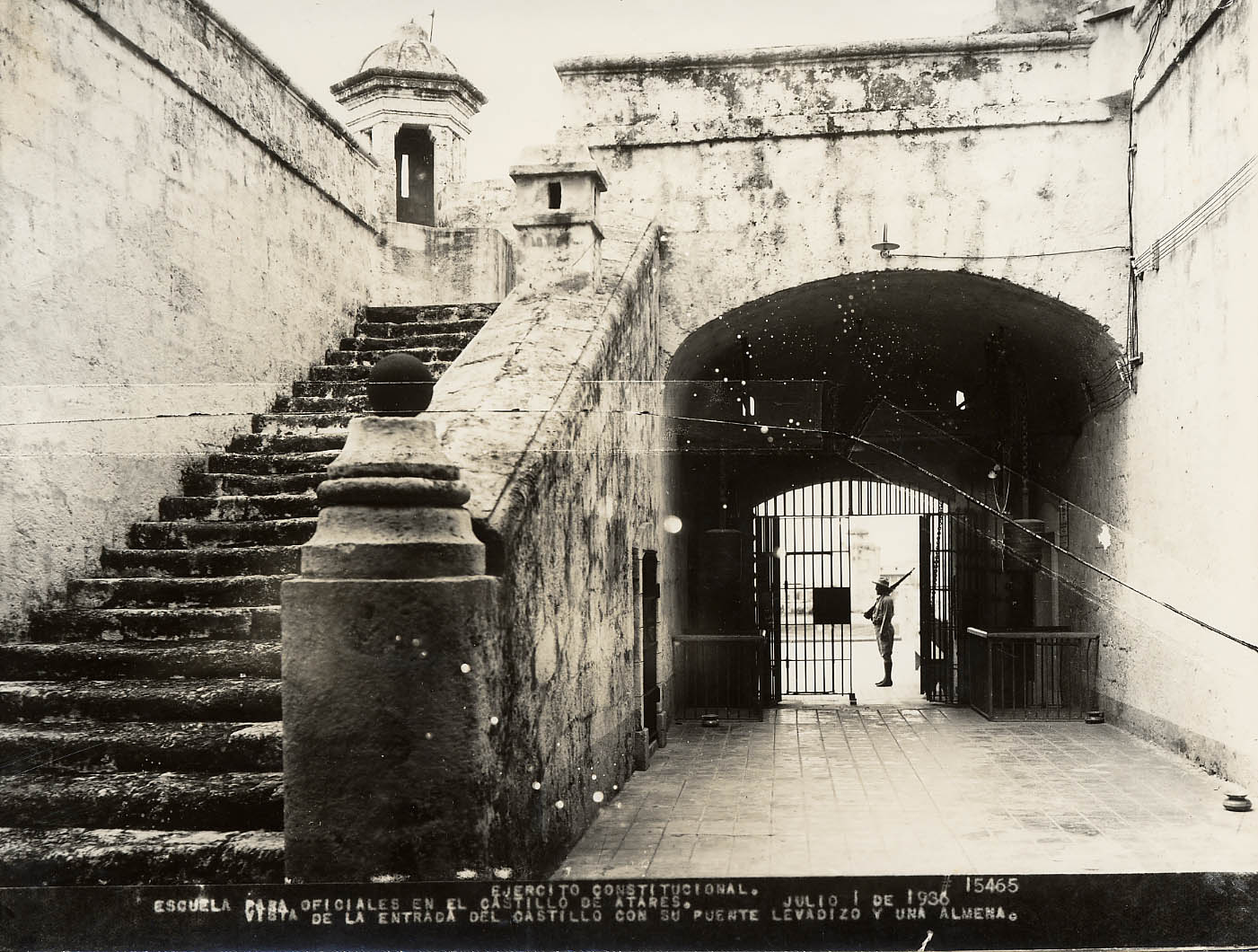
Castillo de Atarés - 1936-drawbridge-and-a-battlement, Havana, Cuba

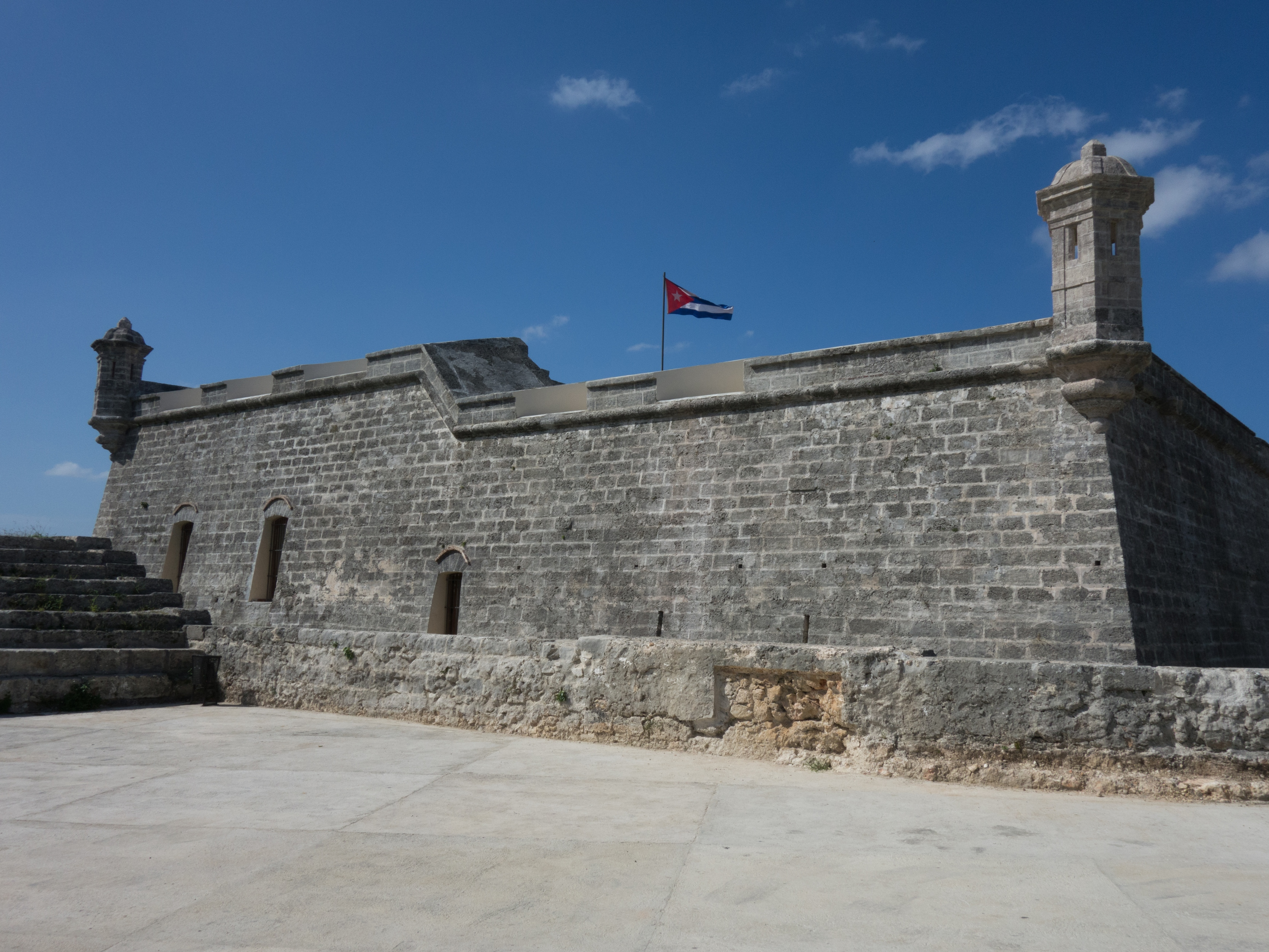
Castillo de Atarés, Havana, Cuba

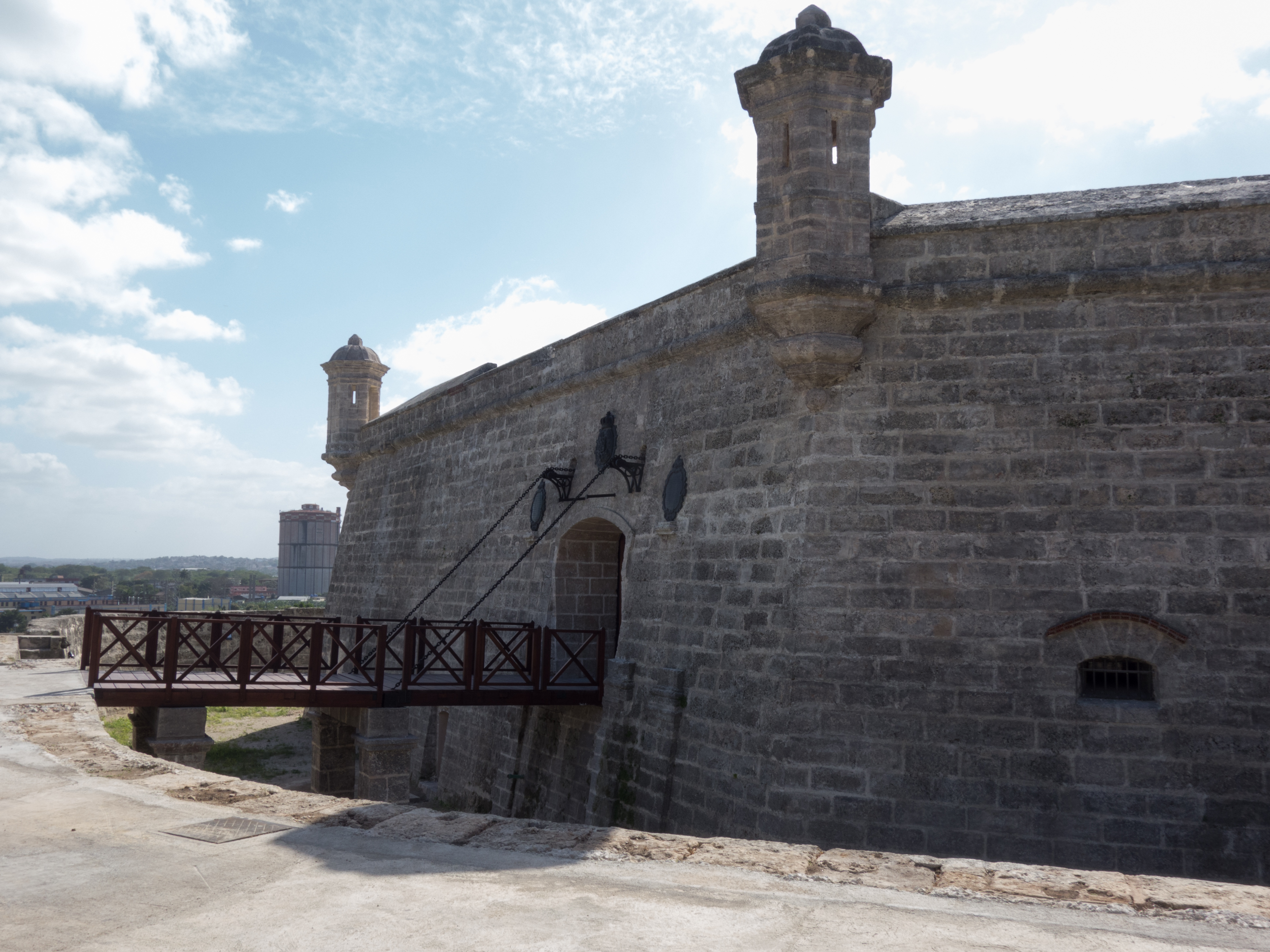
Entrance of the Castillo de Atarés.

== See also ==
- List of buildings in Havana
- Royal Shipyard of Havana
- Treaty of Paris (1763)
- Batería de la de la Reina
- Castillo San Salvador de la Punta
- Timeline of Havana
