= Milun Marović =

Serbian basketball player (1947–2009)

- Милун Маровић
- Born: 15 September 1947; Čačak, PR Serbia, FPR Yugoslavia
- Died: 19 October 2009 (aged 62); Libya
- Education: University of Belgrade
- Occupations: Geologist; university professor; basketball player
- Height: 2.06 m (6 ft 9 in)
- Basketball career

Career information
- NBA draft: 1969: undrafted
- Playing career: 1967–1983
- Position: Center
- Number: 11

Career history
- 1967–1983: Radnički Belgrade

Career highlights
- Yugoslav League champion (1973); Yugoslav Cup winner (1976)
Medals
Men's basketball
Representing Yugoslavia
EuroBasket
| Gold medal – first place | 1973 Spain | Team |
World Championship
| Silver medal – second place | 1974 Puerto Rico | Team |
Mediterranean Games
| Gold medal – first place | 1971 Turkey | National Team |

Milun Marović (Serbian Cyrillic: Милун Маровић; 15 September 1947 – 19 October 2009) was a Serbian geologist, university professor and basketball player.

== Career ==
Marović spent entire playing career with Radnički Belgrade of the Yugoslav League. Marović was a member of Radnički teams that won the Yugoslav League in the 1972–73 season and the Yugoslav Cup in 1976. He played in the 1977 FIBA European Cup Winners' Cup final.

Marović was a member of the Yugoslavia national team that competed in the men's tournament at the 1972 Summer Olympics.
