= Dragi Ivković =

Serbian basketball player

Personal information
- Born: 6 March 1948 (age 78) Belgrade, PR Serbia, FPR Yugoslavia
- Listed height: 1.98 m (6 ft 6 in)

Career information
- NBA draft: 1972: undrafted
- Playing career: 1966–1985
- Position: Shooting guard / point guard
- Number: 4

Career history
- 1966–1979: Radnički Belgrade
- ŠKK Zvezdara

Career highlights
- Yugoslav League champion (1973); Yugoslav Cup (1976)
Medals
Men's basketball
Representing Yugoslavia
EuroBasket
Gold medal – first place	1973 Spain	National Team
Mediterranean Games
Gold medal – first place	1971 Turkey	National Team

Dragi Ivković (Serbian Cyrillic: Драги Ивковић; born 6 March 1948), also credited as Dragan Ivković and known by his nickname Tvigi, is a Serbian retired professional basketball player.

== Playing career ==
Ivković was a member of Radnički Belgrade teams that won the Yugoslav League in the 1972–73 season and the Yugoslav Cup in 1976. He played in the 1977 FIBA European Cup Winners' Cup final.

== National team career ==
Ivković was a member of the Yugoslavia national team that won the gold medal at the 1971 Mediterranean Games in Turkey.

He was a member of the national team that won the gold medal at the 1973 FIBA European Championship in Spain. Over four tournament games, he averaged 6.7 points per game.
