= Slobodan Ivković =

Serbian basketball player and coach (1937–1995)

Personal information
- Born: 4 August 1937 Belgrade, Kingdom of Yugoslavia
- Died: 28 November 1995 (aged 58) Belgrade, FR Yugoslavia
- Listed height: 1.87 m (6 ft 2 in)
- Coaching career: 1966–1995

Career history

Playing
- Radnički Belgrade

Coaching
- 1966–1967: OKK Beograd
- 1967–1976: Radnički Belgrade
- 1977–1978: Kazma
- 1979–1980, 1981: OKK Beograd
- 1984–1989: Al Ahli
- 1989–1990: Radnički Belgrade
- 1990–1991: MZT Skopje
- 1993–1995: Radnički Belgrade

Career highlights
- As head coach: YABC Award for Lifetime Achievement (1995); Yugoslav League champion (1973); Yugoslav Cup winner (1976)

Slobodan "Piva" Ivković (Serbian Cyrillic: Слободан Ивковић; 4 August 1937 – 28 November 1995) was a Serbian professional basketball player and coach.

== Playing career ==
Ivković played club basketball at the senior level in the club Radnički Belgrade. He was a well-talented player with much better physical capabilities, but nobody managed to stabilize him as a player. Besides that, he had weak sight, which was a serious problem since in those times many games were played outside, during the night.

== Coaching career ==
Ivković was one of the first Serbian coaches that went to school in the USA. He was the founder of the creation of a modern coach organization in the former Yugoslavia. He coached in the following clubs: Radnički Belgrade, OKK Belgrade, MZT Skopje, Kazma (Kuwait), and Al Ahli (United Arab Emirates).

== Personal life ==
His younger brother Dušan was a former basketball player and FIBA Hall of Fame coach.

Ivković is related to the famous Serbian scientist Nikola Tesla. Ivković's maternal grandmother Olga Mandić and Tesla were first cousins.

A memorial tournament named after him is held in Belgrade. The organizer is the basketball club Radnički.

== Career achievements ==
Head coach

- Yugoslav League: 1 (with Radnički Belgrade: 1972–73)
- Yugoslav Cup: 1 (with Radnički Belgrade: 1975–76)
- FIBA European Champions Cup – semifinalist (with Radnički Belgrade: 1973–74)

== See also ==
- Slobodan Piva Ivković Award for Lifetime Achievement
