= Janez Brodnik =

Slovenian gymnast (born 1944)

- Јанез Бродник
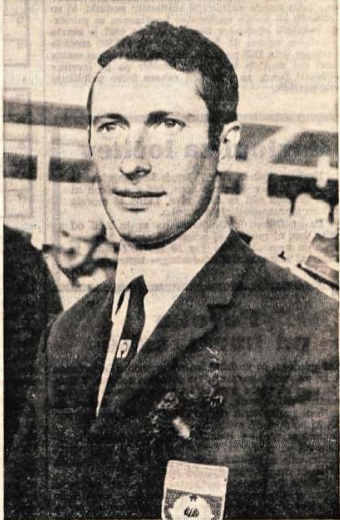
- Brodnik in 1968

Personal information
- Born: 6 May 1944 (age 82) Golnik, Nazi Germany
- Height: 1.72 m (5 ft 8 in)

Gymnastics career
- Discipline: Men's artistic gymnastics
- Country represented: Yugoslavia

Janez Brodnik (born 6 May 1944) is a Slovenian gymnast. He competed at the 1964 Summer Olympics, the 1968 Summer Olympics and the 1972 Summer Olympics.
