= Miroljub Damjanović =

Serbian basketball player

Miroljub Damnjanović
Personal information
- Born: 25 November 1950 (age 75) Leskovac, PR Serbia, FPR Yugoslavia
- Listed height: 2.02 m (6 ft 8 in)
- Listed weight: 88 kg (194 lb)

Career information
- NBA draft: 1972: undrafted
- Playing career: 1967–1984
- Position: Small forward / power forward
- Number: 12

Career history
- 1967–1979: Radnički Belgrade
- 1979–1980: KK Alhos Sarajevo
- 1983–1984: Lucerne
- 1984: Poštar Beograd

Career highlights
- Yugoslav League champion (1973); Yugoslav Cup (1976)
Medals
Men's basketball
Representing Yugoslavia
Mediterranean Games
Gold medal – first place	1971 Turkey	National Team

Miroljub "Dugi" Damnjanović (Serbian Cyrillic: Мирољуб Дамјановић; born 25 November 1950) is a Serbian retired basketball player.

== Career ==
Damnjanović was a member of Radnički Belgrade teams that won the Yugoslav League in the 1972–73 season and the Yugoslav Cup in 1976. He played in the 1977 FIBA European Cup Winners' Cup final.

Damnjanović was a member of the Yugoslavia national junior team that competed at the 1970 FIBA Europe Championship for Juniors. He was a member of the Yugoslavia national team that competed in the men's tournament at the 1972 Summer Olympics.
