= Ognjen Lukić =

Serbian footballer

Personal information
- Date of birth: 4 July 2004 (age 22)
- Place of birth: Smederevo, Serbia and Montenegro
- Height: 1.93 m (6 ft 4 in)
- Position: Goalkeeper

Team information
- Current team: Smederevo (on loan from Železničar Pančevo)
- Number: 12

Youth career
- Mihajlovac
- Smederevo
- 2017–2021: Red Star Belgrade
- 2020: →Grafičar Beograd (loan)

Senior career*
Years	Team	Apps	(Gls)
2021–2022	Radnički Kragujevac	39	(0)
2022–2023	Reims II	1	(0)
2023–2024	Železničar Pančevo	3	(0)
2024	→ Smederevo (loan)	12	(0)
2024	OFK Vršac	6	(0)
2025–	Železničar Pančevo	8	(0)
2026–	→ Smederevo (loan)	9	(0)

International career^{‡}
2019	Serbia U17	1	(0)
2021–2022	Serbia U19	11	(0)
- * Club domestic league appearances and goals as of 14 May 2026 ‡ National team caps and goals as of 00:58, 9 June 2023 (UTC)

Ognjen Lukić (Serbian Cyrillic: Огњен Лукић; born 4 July 2003) is a Serbian professional footballer who plays as a goalkeeper for Smederevo, on loan from Železničar Pančevo.

== Career ==
Lukić is a youth product of Mihajlovac and Smederevo, and joined the youth academy of Red Star Belgrade at the age of 14 and worked his way up their ranks, spending a short period on loan with Grafičar Beograd in 2020. On 4 February 2021, he transferred to Radnički Kragujevac in the Serbian First League where he began his senior career. He made 16 appearances in his debut season with them, helping them win the league and earn promotion to the Serbian SuperLiga. On 4 August 2022, he transferred to the French club Reims signing a 5-year contract, and was initially assigned to their reserves.

== International career ==
Lukić is a youth international for Serbia, having played up to the Serbia U19s.

== Honours ==
Radnički Kragujevac

- Serbian First League: 2020–21
