= Judo at the 1971 Mediterranean Games =

- Location: İzmir, Turkey
- Dates: 14 October 1971

The Judo competition at the 1971 Mediterranean Games was held in İzmir, Turkey on 14 October 1971.

== Medal overview ==
=== Men ===
Games	Gold	Silver	Bronze
Lightweight; 63 kg	Giuseppe Vismara; Italy	Stanko Topolčnik; Yugoslavia	Ali Demir; Turkey
Lightweight; 63 kg	Giuseppe Vismara; Italy	Stanko Topolčnik; Yugoslavia	Rafael Ortega Fernández; Spain
Half middleweight 70 kg	Alfredo Vismara; Italy	Süheyl Yeşilnur; Turkey	Fernando Murillo Perez; Spain
Half middleweight 70 kg	Alfredo Vismara; Italy	Süheyl Yeşilnur; Turkey	Abdou Mohamed Elsayed; Egypt
Middleweight; 80 kg	Slobodan Kraljević; Yugoslavia	Andrés Coruña Melián; Spain	Namık Ekin; Turkey
Middleweight; 80 kg	Slobodan Kraljević; Yugoslavia	Andrés Coruña Melián; Spain	Libero Galimberti; Italy
Half-heavyweight; 93 kg	Goran Žuvela; Yugoslavia	Kamil Korucu; Turkey	Ali Soumer; Tunisia
Half-heavyweight; 93 kg	Goran Žuvela; Yugoslavia	Kamil Korucu; Turkey	Miguel Ángel Tejera; Spain
Heavyweight +100 kg	Santiago Ojeda; Spain	Pavle Bajetić; Yugoslavia	M. Ali Berber; Turkey
Heavyweight +100 kg	Santiago Ojeda; Spain	Pavle Bajetić; Yugoslavia	Tijini Benkassou; Morocco

=== Medal table ===
Rank	Nation	Gold	Silver	Bronze	Total
1	Yugoslavia (YUG)	2	2	0	4
2	Italy (ITA)	2	0	1	3
3	Spain (ESP)	1	1	3	5
4	Turkey (TUR)	0	2	3	5
5	Egypt (EGY)	0	0	1	1
5	Morocco (MAR)	0	0	1	1
5	Tunisia (TUN)	0	0	1	1
Totals (7 entries)		5	5	10	20
