= Wolfgang Radmacher =

German wrestler

Sport
- Country: Germany
- Sport: Amateur wrestling

Wolfgang Radmacher (born 30 December 1946, in Borna) is a German former wrestler who competed in the 1972 Summer Olympics.
