= Ibrahim El-Sayed =

Egyptian wrestler (born 1941)

Personal information
- Nationality: Egyptian
- Born: 8 September 1941 (age 84) Cairo, Egypt

Sport
- Sport: Wrestling

Ibrahim El-Sayed (born 8 September 1941) is an Egyptian wrestler. He competed in the men's Greco-Roman 57 kg at the 1968 Summer Olympics.
