= Ikuei Yamamoto =

Japanese wrestler

Ikuei Yamamoto (山本 郁榮, Yamamoto Ikuei; born 17 February 1945) is a Japanese former wrestler who competed in the 1972 Summer Olympics. Born in Hekikai District, Aichi Prefecture (in what is now Takahama City). He is the father of Miyuu Yamamoto, Norifumi Yamamoto and Seiko Yamamoto.
