= Roland Svensson (wrestler) =

Swedish wrestler

Personal information
- Born: 23 June 1945 Malmö, Sweden
- Died: 20 March 2014 (aged 68) Malmö, Sweden
- Height: 165 cm (5 ft 5 in)
- Weight: 57 kg (126 lb)

Sport
- Sport: Greco-Roman wrestling
- Club: BK Envig, Lomma
Medal record
Representing Sweden
World Championships
| Silver medal – second place | 1969 Mar del Plata | -62 kg |

Roland Krister Svensson (23 June 1945 – 20 March 2014) was a bantamweight Greco-Roman wrestler from Sweden who won a silver medal at the 1969 World Wrestling Championships. He competed at the 1968 Summer Olympics, but was eliminated in the second round. His father Egon competed in the same event at the 1936 Olympics.

After retiring from competitions Svensson worked as a coach with Finspångs AIK. In 1993 he was awarded the Frystadsmedal for his contributions to Swedish wrestling. He was a board member of the Swedish Wrestling Federation in the early 2000s.
