= Risto Björlin =

Finnish wrestler (born 1944)

Medal record

Representing Finland

Men's Greco-Roman wrestling

Olympic Games
Bronze medal – third place	1972 Munich	57 kg

Risto Björlin (born 9 December 1944) was a Finnish wrestler. He was born in Vaasa. He won an Olympic bronze medal in Greco-Roman wrestling in 1972. He also competed at the 1964 and 1968 Summer Olympics.
