= Ion Baciu =

Romanian wrestler (born 1944)

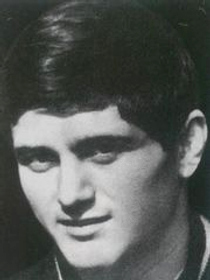

Personal information
- Born: 12 May 1944 (age 82) Tunari, Romania
- Died: 2004 Vivo, Limpopo, South Africa
- Height: 165 cm (5 ft 5 in)

Sport
- Sport: Greco-Roman wrestling
- Club: CS Rapid București; CSA Steaua București
- Coached by: Marian Belusica
Medal record
Representing Romania
Olympic Games
Silver medal – second place	1968 Mexico City	57 kg
World Championships
Gold medal – first place	1967 Bucharest	57 kg
European Championships
Bronze medal – third place	1966 Essen	57 kg
Silver medal – second place	1970 Berlin	57 kg
Bronze medal – third place	1972 Katowice	57 kg

Ion Baciu (born 12 May 1944) is a retired bantamweight Greco-Roman wrestler from Romania. He won the world title in 1967 and a silver medal at the 1968 Olympics, placing sixth in 1972.
