= Khalifa Karouane =

Moroccan wrestler

Personal information
- Nationality: Moroccan
- Born: 1937 Casablanca, Morocco

Sport
- Sport: Wrestling

Khalifa Karouane (1937 – before 1998) was a Moroccan wrestler. He competed in the men's Greco-Roman 57 kg at the 1968 Summer Olympics.
