= Juan Velarde (wrestler) =

Peruvian wrestler

Juan Velarde (born 20 July 1954) is a Peruvian former wrestler who competed in the 1972 Summer Olympics.
