= Francesco Scuderi (wrestler) =

Italian wrestler

Personal information
- Nationality: Italian
- Born: 10 February 1949 (age 77) Catania, Italy

Sport
- Sport: Wrestling

Francesco Scuderi (born 10 February 1949) is an Italian wrestler. He competed in the men's Greco-Roman 57 kg at the 1972 Summer Olympics.
