= An Chun-young =

South Korean wrestler

An Chun-Young (안천영, born 1 July 1944) is a Korean former wrestler who competed in the 1968 Summer Olympics and in the 1972 Summer Olympics.
