= Fawzi Salloum =

Syrian wrestler

Personal information
- Nationality: Syrian
- Born: 15 July 1943 (age 83)

Sport
- Sport: Wrestling

Fawzi Salloum (born 15 July 1943) is a Syrian wrestler. He competed in the men's Greco-Roman 57 kg at the 1972 Summer Olympics.
