= Luís Grilo =

Portuguese wrestler (born 1946)

Personal information
- Nationality: Portuguese
- Born: 5 July 1946 (age 78)

Sport
- Sport: Wrestling

Luís Grilo (born 5 July 1946) is a Portuguese wrestler. He competed at the 1968 Summer Olympics, the 1972 Summer Olympics and the 1976 Summer Olympics.
