= Othon Moskhidis =

Greek wrestler

Personal information
- Nationality: Greek
- Born: 5 February 1942 (age 83)

Sport
- Sport: Wrestling

Othon Moskhidis (born 5 February 1942) is a Greek wrestler. He competed at the 1968 Summer Olympics and the 1972 Summer Olympics.
