= Dragoslav Ražnatović =

Serbian basketball player

Personal information
- Born: April 19, 1941 (age 85) Vranje, Kingdom of Yugoslavia
Medals
Men's basketball
Representing Yugoslavia
Silver medal – second place	1968 Mexico City	Team competition

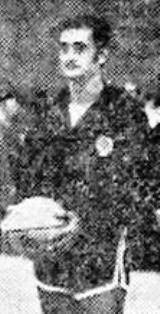
Dragoslav Ražnatović.jpg

Dragoslav Ražnatović (alternate spelling: Raznjatović, born 19 April 1941 in Vranje) is a former Serbian basketball player. He represented the Yugoslavia national basketball team internationally.

== National team career ==
Ražnatović competed for Yugoslavia in the 1964 Summer Olympics and in the 1968 Summer Olympics.
