= 1973–74 FIBA European Champions Cup =

- League: FIBA European Champions Cup
- Sport: Basketball

Final
- Champions: (Spain) Real Madrid (5th title)
- Runners-up: (Italy) Ignis Varese

FIBA European Champions Cup seasons
- ← 1972–73 1974–75 →

The 1973–74 FIBA European Champions Cup was the 17th edition of the European top-tier level professional basketball club competition FIBA European Champions Cup (now called EuroLeague). The Final was held at the Palais des Sports de Beaulieu, in Nantes, France, on April 3, 1974. It was won by Real Madrid, who defeated Ignis Varese in the finals, by a result of 84–82. This was the 5th consecutive final for Varese, and the first of three consecutive finals played between these two teams.

== Competition system ==
- 26 teams (European national domestic league champions, plus the then current title holders), playing in a tournament system, played knock-out rounds on a home and away basis. The aggregate score of both games decided the winner.
- The 8 teams qualified for the Quarterfinals were divided into two groups of four. Every team played against the other three in its group in consecutive home-and-away matches, so that every two of these games counted as a single win or defeat (point difference being a decisive factor there). In case of a tie between two or more teams after the group stage, the following criteria were used: 1) one-to-one games between the teams; 2) basket average; 3) individual wins and defeats.
- The group winners and the runners-up of the Quarterfinal Group Stage qualified for the Semifinals. The final was played at a predetermined venue.

== First round ==
Team 1	Agg.	Team 2	1st leg	2nd leg
USC Heidelberg (West Germany)	152-144	(Portugal) Lourenço Marques	85–65	67–79
Fribourg Olympic (Switzerland)	127-209	(Spain) Real Madrid	74–100	71–105
Csepel (Hungary)	129-135	(Albania) Partizani Tirana	58–57	71–78
Wienerberger (Austria)	-*	(Egypt) Al-Gezira		
Levi's Flamingo's (Netherlands)	255-144	(Scotland) Boroughmir	129–74	126–70
Solna (Sweden)	176-133	(England) Epping Avenue	103–64	73–69
Radnički Belgrade (Socialist Federal Republic of Yugoslavia)	89-49**	(Luxembourg) Amicale	89–49	
Academic (Bulgaria)	284-106	(Morocco) Renaissance Berkane	112–53	172–53
Turun NMKY (Finland)	152-155	(Czechoslovakia) Dukla Olomouc	71–61	81–94
İTÜ (Turkey)	137-160	(Belgium) Ford Antwerpen	64–71	73–89
Wybrzeże Gdańsk (Poland)	157-167	(Greece) Panathinaikos	87–70	70–97

*FIBA cancelled this match and declared Union Wienerberger winner.

**This match played as a single game in Belgrade.

== Second round ==
Team 1	Agg.	Team 2	1st leg	2nd leg
USC Heidelberg (West Germany)	103-214	(Spain) Real Madrid	54–94	48–120
Partizani Tirana (Albania)	140-149	(Austria) Wienerberger	72–71	68–78
Levi's Flamingo's (Netherlands)	156-174	(Israel) Maccabi Elite Tel Aviv	85–84	71–90
Solna (Sweden)	142-155	(Socialist Federal Republic of Yugoslavia) Radnički Belgrade	67–78	75–77
Academic (Bulgaria)	163-155	(Czechoslovakia) Dukla Olomouc	83–65	80–90
Ford Antwerpen (Belgium)	140-132	(Romania) Dinamo București	75–65	65–67
Panathinaikos (Greece)	156-182	(France) Berck	99–80	57–102

Automatically qualified to the group stage

- (Italy) Ignis Varese (title holder)

== Quarterfinals group stage ==
The quarterfinals were played with a round-robin system, in which every Two Game series (TGS) constituted as one game for the record.

Key to colors
Top two places in each group advance to Semifinals

=== Group A ===
	Team	Pld	Pts	W	L	PF	PA	PD
1.	(Italy) Ignis Varese	3	6	3	0	538	453	+85
2.	(France) Berck	3	5	2	1	500	484	+16
3.	(Israel) Maccabi Elite Tel Aviv	3	4	1	2	493	508	-15
4.	(Belgium) Ford Antwerpen	3	3	0	3	448	534	-86

=== Group B ===
	Team	Pld	Pts	W	L	PF	PA	PD
1.	(Spain) Real Madrid	3	6	3	0	591	484	+107
2.	(Socialist Federal Republic of Yugoslavia) Radnički Belgrade	3	5	2	1	542	534	+8
3.	(Austria) Wienerberger	3	4	1	2	487	517	-30
4.	(Bulgaria) Academic	3	3	0	3	525	610	-85

== Semifinals ==
Team 1	Agg.	Team 2	1st leg	2nd leg
Ignis Varese (Italy)	175–161	(Socialist Federal Republic of Yugoslavia) Radnički Belgrade	105–78	70–83
Real Madrid (Spain)	194–148	(France) Berck	99–67	95–81

== Final ==
April 3, Palais des Sports de Beaulieu, Nantes

Team 1	Score	Team 2
Real Madrid (Spain)	84–82	(Italy) Ignis Varese

1973–74 FIBA European Champions Cup
Champions

Real Madrid
5th Title

== Awards ==
=== FIBA European Champions Cup Finals Top Scorer ===
- (Italy) Dino Meneghin ( (Italy) Ignis Varese)
