= Karlo Čović =

Serbian wrestler (born 1945)

Personal information
- Nationality: Serbian
- Born: 9 August 1945 (age 80) Subotica, FS Serbia, DF Yugoslavia

Sport
- Sport: Wrestling

Karlo Čović (Serbian Cyrillic: Карло Човић; born 9 August 1945) is a Serbian wrestler of Vojvodinian Croat descent. He competed for Yugoslavia at the 1968 Summer Olympics and the 1972 Summer Olympics.
