= 1976–77 FIBA European Cup Winners' Cup =

- League: FIBA European Cup Winners' Cup
- Sport: Basketball

Finals
- Champions: (Italy) Birra Forst Cantù
- Runners-up: (Socialist Federal Republic of Yugoslavia) Radnički Belgrade

FIBA European Cup Winners' Cup seasons
- ← 1975–76 1977–78 →

The 1976–77 FIBA European Cup Winners' Cup was the eleventh edition of FIBA's 2nd-tier level European-wide professional club basketball competition, contested between national domestic cup champions, running from 20 October 1976, to 29 March 1977. It was contested by 25 teams, five more than in the previous edition.

The Italian League became the first league to win the competition twice in a row, for a second time, when Birra Forst Cantù defeated Radnički Belgrade, in the final, held in Palma de Mallorca. Cantù had previously defeated defending champions Cinzano Milano, in the semifinals, in the competition's third tie between two clubs from the same country. Cantù was the fourth Italian club to win the FIBA Cup Winners' Cup, after Ignis Varese, Fides Napoli, and Olimpia Milano.

== Participants ==
Country	Teams	Clubs	
Italy	2	Birra Forst Cantù	Cinzano Milano
Albania	1	Partizani Tirana	
Austria	1	Trend Wien	
Belgium	1	Ijsboerke Kortrijk	
Bulgaria	1	Botev	
Czechoslovakia	1	Slavia VŠ Praha	
Egypt	1	Al-Zamalek	
England	1	Embassy All-Stars	
France	1	ASVEL	
Greece	1	AEK	
Iceland	1	Njarðvík	
Israel	1	Hapoel Gvat/Yagur	
Luxembourg	1	Etzella	
Netherlands	1	Buitoni Flamingo's	
Poland	1	Wybrzeże Gdańsk	
Romania	1	Steaua București	
Scotland	1	Boroughmir Barrs	
Soviet Union	1	Spartak Leningrad	
Spain	1	Juventud Schweppes	
Sweden	1	Högsbo	
Switzerland	1	Fribourg Olympic	
Turkey	1	Beşiktaş	
West Germany	1	Wolfenbüttel	
(Socialist Federal Republic of Yugoslavia) Yugoslavia	1	Radnički Belgrade	

== First round ==
Team 1	Agg.	Team 2	1st leg	2nd leg
Etzella (Luxembourg)	120–211	(Austria) Trend Wien	60–99	60–112
Hapoel Gvat/Yagur (Israel)	145–163	(Romania) Steaua București	83–71	62–92
Fribourg Olympic (Switzerland)	141–147	(Turkey) Beşiktaş	82–71	59–76
Njarðvík (Iceland)	143–165	(Scotland) Boroughmir Barrs	77–78	66–87
Buitoni Flamingo's (Netherlands)	167–189	(Spain) Juventud Schweppes	80–74	87–115
Al-Zamalek (Egypt)	166–189	(Poland) Wybrzeże Gdańsk	78–79	88–110
Partizani Tirana (Albania)	0–4*	(Socialist Federal Republic of Yugoslavia) Radnički Belgrade	0–2	0–2
Högsbo (Sweden)	172–169	(West Germany) Wolfenbüttel	91–74	81–95
Botev (Bulgaria)	179–187	(Belgium) Ijsboerke Kortrijk	98–85	81–102
AEK (Greece)	132–172	(Czechoslovakia) Slavia VŠ Praha	73–66	59–106
Embassy All-Stars (England)	173–192	(France) ASVEL	87–83	86–109

*Partizani Tirana withdrew before the first leg, and Radnički Belgrade received a forfeit (2-0) in both games.

== Second round ==
Team 1	Agg.	Team 2	1st leg	2nd leg
Trend Wien (Austria)	166–179	(France) ASVEL	92–83	74–96
Steaua București (Romania)	143–141	(Turkey) Beşiktaş	77–57	66–84
Boroughmir Barrs (Scotland)	130–237	(Spain) Juventud Schweppes	66–111	64–126
Wybrzeże Gdańsk (Poland)	187–211	(Socialist Federal Republic of Yugoslavia) Radnički Belgrade	101–94	86–117
Högsbo (Sweden)	180–208	(Italy) Birra Forst Cantù	95–101	85–107
Ijsboerke Kortrijk (Belgium)	165–178	(Czechoslovakia) Slavia VŠ Praha	96–83	69–95

Automatically qualified to the Quarter finals group stage

- (Italy) Cinzano Milano (title holder)
- (Soviet Union) Spartak Leningrad

== Quarterfinals ==
Key to colors
Top two places in each group advance to semifinals

=== Group A ===
	(Socialist Federal Republic of Yugoslavia) RAD	(Italy) MIL	(Soviet Union) SPA	(Czechoslovakia) SLA
(Socialist Federal Republic of Yugoslavia) RAD		87-73	85-80	115-70
(Italy) MIL	99-85		94-69	105-63
(Soviet Union) SPA	99-84	103-86		84-58
(Czechoslovakia) SLA	54-84	97-83	84-79	

	Team	Pld	Pts	W	L	PF	PA	PD
1.	(Socialist Federal Republic of Yugoslavia) Radnički Belgrade	6	10	4	2	540	475	+65
2.	(Italy) Cinzano Milano	6	9	3	3	540	504	+36
3.	(Soviet Union) Spartak Leningrad	6	9	3	3	514	491	+23
4.	(Czechoslovakia) Slavia VŠ Praha	6	8	2	4	426	550	-124

=== Group B ===
	(Italy) CAN	(Spain) JUV	(Romania) STE	(France) ASV
(Italy) CAN		105-76	99-77	125-76
(Spain) JUV	93-86		100-77	100-83
(Romania) STE	88-85	82-74		65-59
(France) ASV	85-99	95-96	105-95	

	Team	Pld	Pts	W	L	PF	PA	PD
1.	(Italy) Birra Forst Cantù	6	10	4	2	599	495	+104
2.	(Spain) Juventud Schweppes	6	10	4	2	539	528	+11
3.	(Romania) Steaua București	6	9	3	3	484	522	-38
4.	(France) ASVEL	6	7	1	5	503	580	-77

== Semifinals ==
Team 1	Agg.	Team 2	1st leg	2nd leg
Birra Forst Cantù (Italy)	199–173	(Italy) Cinzano Milano	101–78	98–95
Juventud Schweppes (Spain)	154–171	(Socialist Federal Republic of Yugoslavia) Radnički Belgrade	74–77	80–94

== Final ==
March 29, Palau Municipal d'Esports Son Moix, Palma de Mallorca

Team 1	Score	Team 2
Birra Forst Cantù (Italy)	87–86	(Socialist Federal Republic of Yugoslavia) Radnički Belgrade

1976–77 FIBA European Cup Winners' Cup Champions

Birra Forst Cantù
1st title
