= 2008–09 HEBA Greek All Star Game =

The 2008–09 HEBA Greek All Star Game marked the 17th HEBA Greek All Star Game of the HEBA A1 Division. The game was held on March 15, 2009, at Xanthi Arena in Xanthi, Greece. The Greek All Stars beat The Rest of the World All Stars by a score of 127-93. Ioannis Bourousis was named the MVP of the game.

== Rest of the World All Stars ==
Head coach:

- (Serbia) Željko Obradović (Panathinaikos Athens)

Assistant coach:

- (Italy) Andrea Mazzon (Aris Thessaloniki)

Roster:

- (Montenegro) Nikola Peković (Panathinaikos Athens)
- (United States) Mike Batiste (Panathinaikos Athens)
- (Lithuania) Šarūnas Jasikevičius (Panathinaikos Athens)
- (United States) Drew Nicholas (Panathinaikos Athens)
- (United States) Travon Bryant (AEK Athens)
- (United States) Aaron Miles (Panionios Nea Smyrni)
- (United States) Anthony Grundy (Panellinios Athens)
- (Bulgaria) Keydren Clark (Aris Thessaloniki)
- (Croatia) Nikola Vujčić (Olympiacos Piraeus)
- (United States) Lynn Greer (Olympiacos Piraeus)
- (Israel) Yotam Halperin (Olympiacos Piraeus)
- (United States) Jannero Pargo (Olympiacos Piraeus)

== Greek All Stars ==
Head coach:

- (Greece) Panagiotis Giannakis (Olympiacos Piraeus)

Assistant coach:

- (Greece) Ioannis Sferopoulos (Colossus Rhodes)

Roster:

- (Greece) Ioannis Bourousis (Olympiacos Piraeus)
- (Greece) Theo Papaloukas (Olympiacos Piraeus)
- (Greece) Panagiotis Vasilopoulos (Olympiacos Piraeus)
- (Greece) Dimitris Papanikolaou (AEK Athens)
- (Greece) Andreas Glyniadakis (Maroussi Athens)
- (Greece) Loukas Mavrokefalidis (Maroussi Athens)
- (Greece) Kostas Charalampidis (Maroussi Athens)
- (Greece) Dimitris Tsaldaris (Aris Thessaloniki)
- (Greece) Vassilis Spanoulis (Panathinaikos Athens)
- (Greece) Dimitris Diamantidis (Panathinaikos Athens)
- (Greece) Antonis Fotsis (Panathinaikos Athens)
- (Greece) Stratos Perperoglou (Panathinaikos Athens)

== Slam Dunk Nail Guns Contest ==
Will Daniels won the slam dunk contest and broke the backboard with one of his dunks.

=== Slam Dunk Nail Guns participants ===
- (Greece) Georgios Printezis (Olympiacos Piraeus)
- (United States) Lance Harris (Colossus Rhodes)
- (Canada) Levon Kendall (Panionios Nea Smyrni)
- (United States) Will Daniels (EKK Kavala)
- (United States) Torin Francis (AEL 1964 Larissa)
- (United States) Anthony Grundy (Panellinios Athens)
- (Greece) Ioannis Psathas (Panerithraikos AS)

== Triple Shootout Contest ==
Dimitris Karadolamis won the 3 point shootout contest.

=== Triple Shootout Contest participants ===
- (Greece) Makis Nikolaidis (Trikala 2000)
- (Israel) Yotam Halperin (Olympiacos Piraeus)
- (Germany) Sven Schultze (Olympia Larissa)
- (United States) Drew Nicholas (Panathinaikos Athens)
- (Greece) Dimitris Tsaldaris (Aris Thessaloniki)
- (Greece) Nikos Michalos (Near East Athens)
- (Greece) Dimitris Karadolamis (AEL 1964 Larissa) (Winner of the Hopes Triple competition)

== Hopes Greek All Star Game ==
The Greek Hopes All Star Game is played between Greek pro players that are ages 21 and under and come from the north and the south regions of the country. The game marked the 7th Hopes All Star game. The game was held on March 14, 2009, at Xanthi Arena in Xanthi, Greece. The North beat The South by a score of 65-53. Kostas Papanikolaou was named the MVP of the game.

=== North All Stars ===
Head coach:

- (Greece) Dimitris Itoudis (Panathinaikos Athens)

Roster:

- (Greece) Dimitris Karadolamis (AEL 1964 Larissa)
- (Greece) Theodoris Zaras (AEL 1964 Larissa)
- (Greece) Karolos Galazoulas (PAOK Thessaloniki)
- (Greece) Dimitris Kalampakas (PAOK Thessaloniki)
- (Greece) Michalis Giannakidis (PAOK Thessaloniki)
- (Greece) Giorgo Kaklamanos (EKK Kavala)
- (Greece) Spyros Mourtos (Aris Thessaloniki)
- (Greece) Linos Chrysikopoulos (Aris Thessaloniki)
- (Greece) Dimitris Samaras (Aris Thessaloniki)
- (Greece) Gaios Skordilis (Aris Thessaloniki)
- (Greece) Kostas Papanikolaou (Aris Thessaloniki)
- (Greece) Giannis Karagiolidis (Olympia Larissa)

=== South All Stars ===
Head coach:

- (Greece) Manos Manouselis (Olympiacos Piraeus)

Roster:

- (Greece) Nondas Papantoniou (Maroussi Athens)
- (Greece) Petros Noeas (Maroussi Athens)
- (Greece) Stavros Toutziarakis (Maroussi Athens)
- (Greece) Christos Marinos (Egaleo AO)
- (Greece) Alexandros Avgenikos (Colossus Rhodes)
- (Greece) Giorgos Danas (Colossus Rhodes)
- (Greece) Charis Giannopoulos (Olympiacos Piraeus)
- (Greece) Kostas Sloukas (Olympiacos Piraeus)
- (Greece) Ioannis Karathanasis (Olympiacos Piraeus)
- (Greece) Andreas Kanonidis (Panionios Nea Smyrni)
- (Greece) Dimitris Verginis (Panathinaikos Athens)
- (Greece) Tasos Antonakis (AEK Athens)

== Hopes Triple Shootout Contest ==
Dimitris Karadolamis won the Hopes ages 22 and under 3 point shootout contest and advanced to the senior 3 point competition, which he also won.

=== Hopes Triple Shootout Contest participants ===
- (Greece) Kostas Sloukas (Olympiacos Piraeus)
- (Greece) Charis Giannopoulos (Olympiacos Piraeus)
- (Greece) Kostas Papanikolaou (Aris Thessaloniki)
- (Greece) Dimitris Samaras (Aris Thessaloniki)
- (Greece) Michalis Giannakidis (PAOK Thessaloniki)
- (Greece) Vassilis Kalfas (Xanthi)
- (Greece) Dimitris Verginis (Panathinaikos Athens)
- (Greece) Dimitris Karadolamis (AEL 1964 Larissa)
