= Nikolopoulos =

Nikolopoulos (Greek: Νικολόπουλος) is a Greek surname, meaning "son of Nikolaos". The female version of the name is Nikolopoulou (Νικολοπούλου). Notable examples include:

- Alexandros Nikolopoulos (disambiguation), multiple people
- Angeliki Nikolopoulou (born 1991), Greek basketball player
- Angelo Nikolopoulos (born 1981), American poet
- Dimitrios S. Nikolopoulos (born 1973), Greek-British computer scientist
- Konstantinos Nikolopoulos (disambiguation), multiple people
- Nikolaos Nikolopoulos (born 1958), Greek politician
- Nikos Nikolopoulos (disambiguation), multiple people
- Ntinos Nikolopoulos (born 1988), Greek basketball player
- Orestis Nikolopoulos (born 1991), Greek footballer
- Stamatios Nikolopoulos, Greek racing cyclist

== See also ==
- Nikolaou
- Nikolaidis
