= Giorgos Valavanidis =

Greek basketball player (1974–2024)

Personal information
- Born: 16 February 1974 Böblingen, Baden-Württemberg, West Germany
- Died: 12 November 2024 (aged 50) Thessaloniki, Greece
- Listed height: 6 ft 8.31 in (2.04 m)

Career information
- Playing career: 1990–2010
- Position: Center

Career history
- 1990–1994: PAOK
- 1994–2000: MENT
- 2000–2001: Xanthi
- 2001–2003: Kolossos
- 2003–2004: Nikopoli Preveza
- 2004–2006: Panorama
- 2006–2007: Aias Evosmou
- 2007–2008: Apollon Kalamarias
- 2008–2009: AS Asvestohoriou
- 2009–2010: Apollon Kalamarias

Career highlights
- European Cup Winners' Cup champion (1991); FIBA Korać Cup champion (1994); Greek League champion (1992)
Medals
Men's basketball
Representing Greece
FIBA Europe U16 Championship
Silver medal – second place	1991 Greece	Team

Giorgos Valavanidis (Greek: Γιώργος Βαλαβανίδης; 16 February 1974 – 12 November 2024) was a Greek professional basketball player.

== Professional career ==
Valavanidis's origin is from Alexandroupoli and was raised in the local club of Feres, Evros. He started his career from there and transferred to PAOK in 1988. He played with PAOK'S youth teams and he was promoted to the first team in 1991. Valavanidis was member of the team which won the Saporta Cup 1991, at the age of 17. He played with PAOK, until 1994 and he won the Greek League championship in 1992, and FIBA Korać Cup in 1994. In 1994 Valavanidis moved to MENT, and he played for six years. After 2000 he played with several clubs such as Xanthi, Kolossos, Xanthi, Panorama, Aias Evosmou and Apollon Kalamarias. In 2010 Valanidis returned to PAOK and became coach at club's academies.

== Greek national team ==
Valavanidis won the silver medal at the FIBA Europe Under-16 Championship. He also played at the 1992 FIBA Europe Under-18 Championship, in which his team finished in fourth place.

== Death ==
Valavanidis died from a heart attack in Thessaloniki, on 12 November 2024, at the age of 50.
