= Danas (disambiguation) =

Danas is a Serbian newspaper.

Danas may also refer to:

== People ==
- Danas Andriulionis (1951–2023), Lithuanian painter
- Danas Pozniakas (1939–2005), Lithuanian boxer
- Danas Rapšys (born 1995), Lithuanian swimmer
- Giorgos Danas (born 1991), Greek basketball player

== Other uses ==
- List of storms named Danas
- Danas Run, a stream in the Ohio, tributary to the Ohio River
