= Nikolaou =

Nikolaou or Nicolaou (Greek: Νικολάου) is a surname. It means "[child] of Nikolaos", and is both masculine and feminine.

- Charis Nicolaou (born 1974), Cypriot footballer
- Diamantis Nikolaou (1790–1856), Greek klepht
- Dimitrios Nikolaou (born 1989), Greek footballer
- George Nicolaou (born 1945), Cypriot judge
- Giorgos Nicolaou (born 1982), Cypriot footballer
- Ionas Nicolaou (born 1963), Cypriot politician
- Jannis Nikolaou (born 1993), German–Greek footballer
- K. C. Nicolaou, Cypriot-American chemist
- Konstantia Nikolaou (born 1984), Cypriot shooter
- Lakis Nikolaou (born 1949), Greek footballer
- Marios Nicolaou (footballer, born 1981), Cypriot footballer
- Marios Nicolaou (footballer, born 1983), Cypriot footballer
- Nikolas Nicolaou (born 1979), Cypriot footballer
- Nikos Nikolaou (1909–1986), Greek artist
- Nikos Nikolaou (rower) (1925–?), Greek rower
- Nikos Nicolaou (disambiguation), several people
- Panicos Nicolaou, Cypriot banker
- Ted Nicolaou, American film director, screenwriter and producer

== See also ==
- Nikolaidis
- Nikolopoulos
- Nikolaos
- Nikolaos
