= Spanoulis =

Spanoulis is a surname. Notable people with the surname include:

- Vassilis Spanoulis
- Dimitrios Spanoulis
