= Ntinos Nikolopoulos =

Greek basketball player

Ntinos Nikolopoulos Ντίνος Νικολόπουλος
No. 5 – Machites Doxas Pefkon
- Position: Point guard
- League: Greek A2 Basket League

Personal information
- Born: August 30, 1988 (age 38) Xanthi, Greece
- Listed height: 6 ft 0.5 in (1.84 m)

Career information
- Playing career: 2005–present

Career history
- 2005–2007: Xanthi
- 2007–2008: Apollon Kalamarias
- 2008–2010: Epanomi
- 2010–2012: MENT
- 2012–2013: PAOK
- 2013–2015: Aries Trikala
- 2015–2016: Apollon Patras
- 2016–present: Machites Doxas Pefkon

Ntinos Nikolopoulos (alternate names: Kostantinos) (Greek: Ντίνος Νικολόπουλος; born August 30, 1988, in Xanthi, Greece) is a Greek professional basketball player. He is 1.84 m (6 ft 0 in) tall and he plays at the point guard position.

== Professional career ==
Nikolopoulos began his pro career with Xanthi in 2005. In 2010, he moved to the Greek club MENT, which was playing in the Greek 2nd Division at the time. In 2012, he joined the Greek club PAOK. He moved to Aries Trikala in 2014 where he stayed for two seasons. In 2015 he moved to Apollon Patras. In 2016 he moved to Machites Doxas Pefkon in Greek 2nd Division.
