= Milan Jeremić =

Milan Jeremić may refer to:

- Milan Jeremić (footballer)
- Milan Jeremić (basketball)
