= Dimitrios Papadopoulos =

Dimitrios Papadopoulos (Greek: Δημήτριος Παπαδόπουλος) or Dimitris Papadopoulos (Δημήτρης Παπαδόπουλος) can refer to:

- Demetrios I of Constantinople (Demetrios Papadopoulos, 1914–1991), Ecumenical Patriarch of Constantinople 1972-1991
- Dimitris Papadopoulos (basketball player) (born 1966), Greek basketball player
- Dimitris Papadopoulos (basketball coach) (born 1972), Greek basketball coach
- Dimitrios Papadopoulos (footballer, born 1981), Greek footballer
- Dimitrios Papadopoulos (footballer, born 1950) (1950–2020), Greek footballer
- Dimitrios Papadopoulos (general) (1889–1893), Greek Army general
