= Ioannis Sachpatzidis =

Greek basketball player

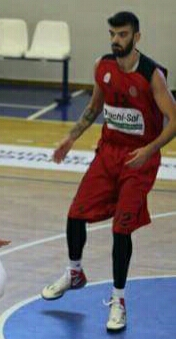
- Sachpatzidis in action with Pagrati.

No. 9 – Doxa Lefkadas
- Position: Center / power forward
- League: Greek A2 Basket League

Personal information
- Born: September 29, 1993 (age 33) Thessaloniki, Greece
- Listed height: 6 ft 10.25 in (2.09 m)
- Listed weight: 240 lb (109 kg)

Career information
- NBA draft: 2015: undrafted
- Playing career: 2014–present

Career history
- 2014–2015: Rethymno Cretan Kings
- 2014–2015: → Irakleio
- 2015–2016: Pagrati
- 2016–2018: Koroivos
- 2018–2019: Ionikos Nikaias
- 2019–2021: Charilaos Trikoupis
- 2021–2022: Larisa
- 2022: Charilaos Trikoupis
- 2022–2023: Panionios
- 2023–present: Doxa Lefkadas

Career highlights
- 3× Greek 2nd Division champion (2019, 2020, 2026); 2x Greek 2nd Division blocks leader (2020, 2024)

Ioannis Sachpatzidis (alternate spellings: Giannis, Yannis) (Greek: Γιάννης Σαχπατζίδης; born September 29, 1993, in Thessaloniki, Greece) is a Greek professional basketball player for Doxa Lefkadas of the Greek A2 Basket League. He is a 2.09 m (6 ft 10 1/4 in) tall power forward-center.

== Professional career ==
Sachpatzidis played minor league level basketball with X.A.N. Thessaloniki, until he joined the Rethymno Cretan Kings of the Greek top-tier level Greek Basket League. The same year, he was loaned to Irakleio of the Greek B League (Greek 3rd Division), where he averaged almost 10 points per game.

The following season, he joined Pagrati of the Greek A2 League (Greek 2nd Division), where he was coached by Dinos Kalampakos. On August 18, 2016, he joined Koroivos Amaliadas of the Greek Basket League, where he eventually became the team captain. The following season, he renewed his contract until 2018.

In 2018, he joined the Greek A2 League club Ionikos Nikaias.

On July 18, 2020, Sachpatzidis joined Charilaos Trikoupis of the Greek A2 League. With Trikoupis, he gained the promotion to the Greek Basket League, while leading the division in blocks. He renewed his contract with the club until 2021.

On July 15, 2021, Sachpatzidis moved to Larisa. On January 9, 2022, he parted ways with Larisa and officially returned to Charilaos Trikoupis. In 8 games, he averaged only 1.6 points and 1.5 rebounds, playing around 7 minutes per contest.
