= Marios Nicolaou =

Marios Nicolaou may refer to:

- Marios Nicolaou (footballer, born 1981), Cypriot defender for Olympiakos Nicosia, Nea Salamis Famagusta and AC Omonia
- Marios Nicolaou (footballer, born 1983), Cypriot midfielder for Panionios of Greece, Aris Limassol and AC Omonia
- Marios Nicolaou (footballer, born 1996), Cypriot footballer
