= Christos Konstantinidis =

Greek basketball player

Personal information
- Born: February 23, 1963 (age 63) Thessaloniki, Greece
- Listed height: 6 ft 4 in (1.93 m)

Career information
- Playing career: 1979–2000
- Positions: Point guard, Shooting guard

Career history
- 1979–1984: PAOK
- 1984–1985: Niki Volos
- 1985–1986: PAOK
- 1986–1991: Philippos Thessaloniki
- 1991–1996: GS Larissa
- 1996–1997: Apollon Patras
- 1997–1998: Philippos Thessaloniki
- 1998–1999: M.E.N.T. B.C.
- 1999–2000: Philippos Thessaloniki

Christos Konstantididis (Greek: Χρήστος Κωνσταντινίδης; born February 23, 1963) is a former Greek professional basketball player. Konstantinidis spent his entire career in the Greek leagues.

== Professional career ==
Born in Thessaloniki, Greece, Konstantinidis started his career playing with M.E.N.T. B.C. When he was 14 years old, he transferred to PAOK. He made his first caps at first team during 1979–80 season. Konstantidis won the World School Championship with Toumba's High School. Also, he won the Greek Championship for Cadets and Junior Men with PAOK, in 1978 and 1981. He played seven years for PAOK first team, and he took part in two Greek Basketball Cup finals. The first was in 1982, and he scored 10 points in 65–63 defeat by Panathinaikos. In 1984 Konstantinidis won the Greek Basketball Cup, after a memorable 84–80 victory against Aris. In same year he was loaned to Niki Volos.

In 1986 he was loaned to Philippos Thessaloniki. Konstantinidis played five years at Philippos and he helped his club to win promotion to Greek Basketball League twice. He also played for GS Larissa and Apollon Patras. In 1998 returned to M.E.N.T. B.C., but the Greek Basketball Federation, blocked his transfer.

== Coaching career ==
After, his retirement he became coach. He was member of PAOK coaching staff. He also coached Iraklis Thessaloniki, and several semi professional teams.

== National team career ==
Konstantinidis has 11 caps with Greece men's national under-20 basketball team, and 2 caps with Greece men's national under-19 basketball team.

== Personal ==
His son Theodoros is also professional basketball player.
