= Nikolaidis =

Nikolaidis (Greek: Νικολαΐδης) is a Greek surname associated typically with the regions of Asia Minor and Pontus but also found across Macedonia and Thrace. It is a patronymic surname that literally means "the son of Nikolaos (Nicolaos)", equivalent to English Nicholson or Nixon, and can also be found transliterated as Nicolaidis, Nicolaides, or even Nikolaides. The feminine form is Nikolaidou (Greek: Νικολαΐδου) but the less formal Nikolaidi (Greek: Νικολαΐδη) can also be found in use as well.

Notable people with this surname include:

- Alexandros Nikolaidis (born 1979), Greek Taekwondo athlete
- Alexandros Nikolaidis (basketball) (born 2002), Greek basketball player
- Andrej Nikolaidis (born 1974), Bosnian novelist and critic
- Apostolos Nikolaidis (athlete) (1896–1980), Greek footballer and track athlete
- Apostolos Nikolaidis (singer) (1938–1999), Greek singer
- Demis Nikolaidis (born 1973), Greek footballer
- Dimitris Nikolaidis (1922–1993), Greek actor
- Efstratios Nikolaidis (born 1985), Greek Paralympic athlete
- Elena Nikolaidi (1909–2002), Greek-American opera singer
- Kalypso Nicolaïdis, Greek-French academic
- Katerina Nikolaidou (born 1992), Greek rower
- Kostas Nikolaidis, Greek footballer
- Nikos Nikolaidis (1939–2007), Greek film director and script writer
- Prodromos "Makis" Nikolaidis (born 1978), Greek basketball player
- Sotiris "Sotos" Nikolaidis (born 1974), Greek basketball player
- Theofilaktos Nikolaidis (born 1973), Greek footballer
- Vera Nikolaidou, Greek parliament member

== See also ==
- Apostolos Nikolaidis Stadium, stadium in Athens
- Nikolaou
- Nikolopoulos
