= Marios Poulianitis =

Greek basketball player (born 1999)

No. 8 – Doxa Lefkadas
- Position: Point guard / shooting guard
- League: GBL

Personal information
- Born: 29 November 1999 (age 26) Thessaloniki, Greece
- Listed height: 6 ft 4 in (1.93 m)
- Listed weight: 194 lb (88 kg)

Career information
- Playing career: 2021–present

Career history
- 2021–2022: Filippos Veria
- 2022–2023: Kavala
- 2023–2024: Iraklis Thessaloniki
- 2024–2025: Trikala
- 2025: Iraklis Thessaloniki
- 2025–2026: Karditsa
- 2026–present: Doxa Lefkadas

Marios Poulianitis (Greek: Μάριος Πουλιανίτης; born 29 November 1999) is a Greek professional basketball player for Doxa Lefkadas of the GBL. He is a 1.93 metres (6 feet 4 inches) tall combo guard.

== Youth career ==
Poulianitis started playing basketball in Thessaloniki, with the junior teams of A.K. Asteria.

== Professional career ==
Poulianitis joined played in the semi-pro level Greek 3rd division with Anatolia, Aias Evosmou and Panseraikos until 2021. He began his pro career in 2021, when he joined Filippos Verias of the Greek 2nd Division.

For the following seasons, he played with multiple clubs of the Greek 2nd Division, including Kavala, Iraklis Thessaloniki and Trikala.

On 16 August 2025 he returned to Iraklis Thessaloniki, after the promotion of the team to the Greek Basketball League. On 30 December 2025, he left Iraklis and joined Karditsa of the Greek Basketball League.

== Personal ==
His brother Stelios is also basketball player.
