= Konstantinos Nikolopoulos =

Konstantinos Nikolopoulos may refer to:

- Konstantinos Nikolopoulos (composer) (1786–1841), Greek composer
- Konstantinos Nikolopoulos (fencer) (1890–1980), Greek Olympic fencer, mayor of Athens, 1951–1955
- Konstantinos Nikolopoulos (footballer, born 1993), Greek footballer
- Konstantinos Nikolopoulos (footballer, born 2002), Greek footballer
- Konstantinos Nikolopoulos (water polo), Greek Olympic water polo player
- Konstantinos Nikolopoulos (neuroscientist), 2019 laureate in Blavatnik Awards
