= Trey Robinson =

American basketball player (born 2002)

No. 1 – Doxa Lefkadas
- Position: Small forward
- League: Greek Basketball League

Personal information
- Born: March 9, 2002 (age 24) Hamilton, Ohio, United States
- Listed height: 6 ft 6 in (1.98 m)
- Listed weight: 220 lb (100 kg)

Career information
- High school: Hamilton (Hamilton, Ohio)
- College: Northern Kentucky (2020–2025)
- NBA draft: 2025: undrafted
- Playing career: 2025–present

Career history
- 2025–present: Doxa Lefkadas

Career highlights
- Greek Elite League champion (2026); Greek Elite League MVP (2026); Greek Elite League Best Foreign Player (2026); All-Greek Elite League First Team (2026); Third-team All-Horizon League (2025); Horizon League Defensive Player of the Year (2024); Horizon League All-Defensive Team (2024)

Trent Daniel Robinson (born March 9, 2002) is an American professional basketball player for Doxa Lefkadas of the Greek Basketball League. He is a 2.01 m (6 ft 7 in) tall small forward.

== Early life and high school career ==
Robinson attended Hamilton High School in Ohio, where he developed into one of the state's top prospects before committing to Northern Kentucky University.

== College career ==
Robinson played five seasons for the Northern Kentucky Norse from 2020 to 2025. During his collegiate career, he appeared in 155 games and established himself as one of the top defensive players in the Horizon League. He was named the Horizon League Defensive Player of the Year for the 2023–24 season and earned All-Horizon League honors in 2024–25.

As a senior in 2024–25, Robinson averaged 15.1 points, 6.1 rebounds and 2.0 assists per game while helping Northern Kentucky reach postseason play.

== Professional career ==
=== Doxa Lefkadas (2025–present) ===
Following the conclusion of his college career, Robinson signed his first professional contract with Doxa Lefkadas in Greece. During the 2025–26 season, he averaged 18.5 points, 5.9 rebounds, 2.8 assists and 1.6 steals per game in the Elite League.

Robinson helped Doxa win the Elite League championship and earn promotion to the Greek Basketball League. He was voted the league's Most Valuable Player, Best Foreign Player and selected to the All-Elite League First Team.

On May 19, 2026, Doxa announced that Robinson would remain with the club for its return to the Greek Basketball League after promotion.

== Career statistics ==
=== College ===
Season	School	GP	PPG	RPG	APG
2020–21	Northern Kentucky	24	5.3	2.3	0.8
2021–22	Northern Kentucky	30	7.0	3.9	1.0
2022–23	Northern Kentucky	34	8.5	4.8	1.3
2023–24	Northern Kentucky	33	8.8	5.4	1.8
2024–25	Northern Kentucky	34	15.1	6.1	2.0
