= Dimitris Legkikas =

Greek basketball player

Doxa Lefkadas
- Position: Power forward
- League: Greek A2 Elite League

Personal information
- Born: 14 April 1995 (age 31) Athens, Greece
- Listed height: 6 ft 9.4 in (2.07 m)

Career information
- NBA draft: 2017: undrafted
- Playing career: 2014–present

Career history
- 2014–2015: Ilysiakos
- 2015–2017: Filathlitikos
- 2017–2021: Lavrio
- 2021–2022: Charilaos Trikoupis
- 2023–2024: Esperos Lamias
- 2024–2025: Mykonos
- 2025–present: Doxa Lefkadas

Career highlights
- Greek Elite League champion (2026)

Dimitris Legkikas (alternate spellings:Sari) (Greek: Δημήτρης Λεγκίκας; born 14 April 1995) he is a Greek professional basketball player. He is a 2.07 m (6 ft 10 in) tall Power forward.

== Professional career ==
Legkikas started his professional career with Ilysiakos in 2014. The following season, he played with Filathlitikos of the Greek B Basket League. After two really good seasons with Filathlitikos, Legikas joined Lavrio of the Greek Basket League. On 3 August 2021, Legkikas moved to Charilaos Trikoupis.

On 27 June 2024 he joined Mykonos of the Greek A2 Elite League.
