= Philippos Amiridis Indoor Hall =

Sporting arena in Xanthi, Greece

- Xanthi Arena
- Interactive map of Philippos Amiridis Indoor Hall
- Location: Xanthi, Greece
- Coordinates: 41.1307°N 24.8902°E
- Owner: City of Xanthi
- Capacity: 3,957
- Surface: Parquet

Construction
- Opened: 2000

Tenants
- Xanthi; Aspida Xanthi

Xanthi Arena, AKA Philippos Amiridis Arena is an indoor sporting arena that is located in the city of Xanthi, in the region of Western Thrace, Greece. The arena can be used for both basketball and volleyball games. Its capacity is 3,957 seats. The arena is named after Philippos Amiridis, a popular mayor of Xanthi, who died in 1999. The arena is owned by the municipality of Xanthi.

== History ==
The arena was used as the home arena of the professional basketball team Xanthi of the Greek 2nd Division. It has also hosted games of the Greek national team, both in basketball and volleyball. The 2001 Greek Volleyball Cup Final Four, and the 2008–09 Greek Basketball All Star Game also took place at the arena.
