= Denver Jones =

American basketball player (born 2000)

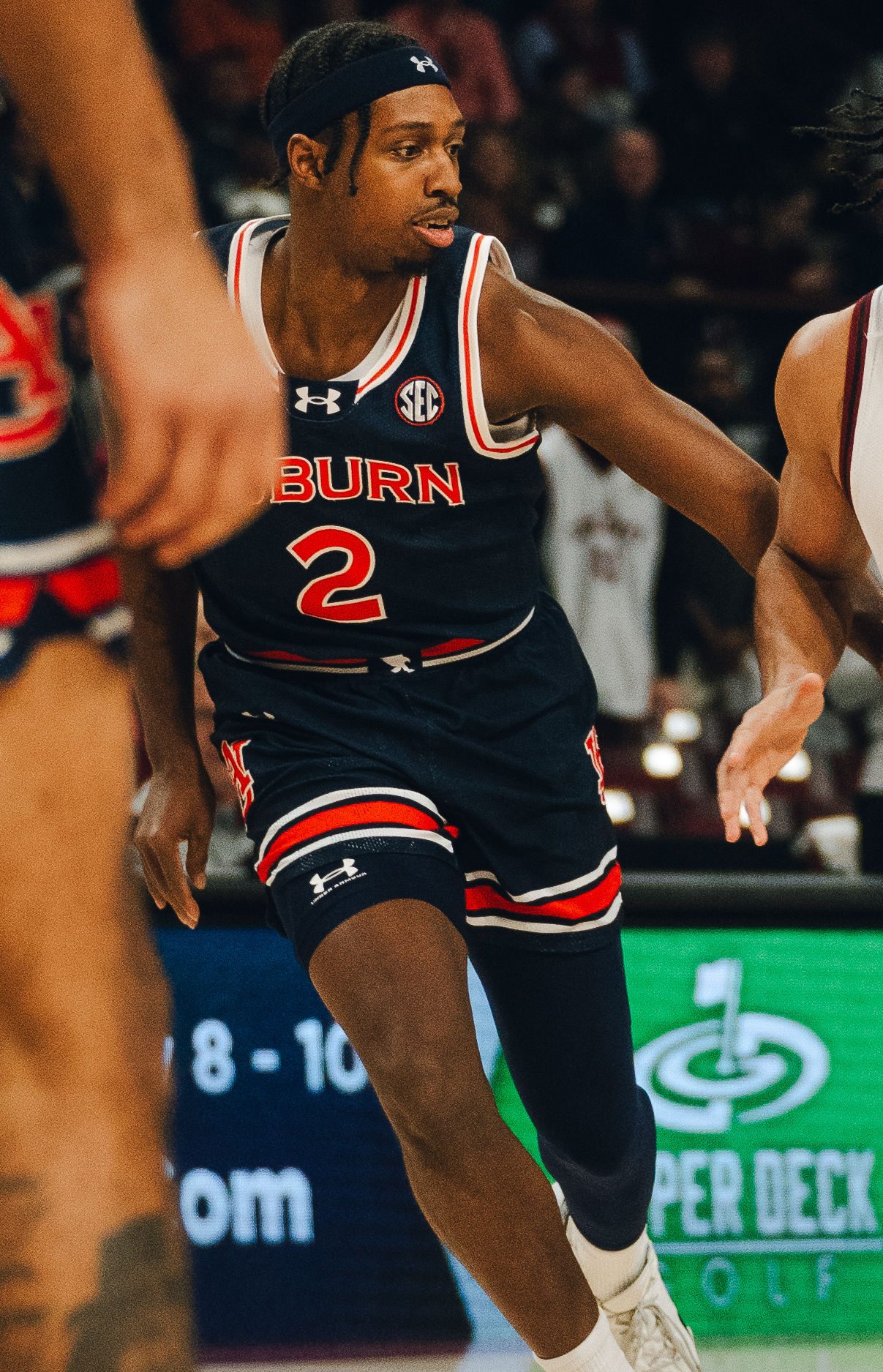

No. 0 – Doxa Lefkadas
- Position: Shooting guard
- League: GBL

Personal information
- Born: November 2, 2000 (age 26) New Market, Alabama, U.S.
- Listed height: 6 ft 4 in (1.93 m)
- Listed weight: 205 lb (93 kg)

Career information
- High school: Memphis University School (Memphis, Tennessee)
- College: Garden City (2020–2021); FIU (2021–2023); Auburn (2023–2025)
- NBA draft: 2025: undrafted
- Playing career: 2025–present

Career history
- 2025–2026: Bnei Herzliya
- 2026–present: Doxa Lefkadas

Career highlights
- SEC All-Defensive team (2025)

Denver Jones (born November 2, 2000) is an American professional basketball player for Doxa Lefkadas of the Greek Basketball League (GBL). He played college basketball for the Garden City Broncbusters, FIU Panthers and Auburn Tigers.

== Early life and high school ==
Jones grew up in New Market, Alabama. An unranked recruit coming out of high school, he committed to play college basketball at Garden City Community College in Garden City, Kansas.

== College career ==
=== Garden City CC ===
In his one season at Garden City, Jones averaged 19.1 points per game on 40 percent three-point shooting.

=== FIU ===
Jones committed to play for the FIU Panthers. In 2021–22, he appeared in 31 games with seven starts, and averaged 12.5 points, 3.7 rebounds, and 2.3 assists per game. On January 7, 2023, Jones notched 29 points and four assists in an upset win over UAB. On March 4, he put up a career-high 30 points against Rice. During the 2022–23 season, Jones made 27 starts where he averaged 20.1 points and 3.8 rebounds per game, earning first-team all-Conference USA honors. After the season, he entered his name into the NCAA transfer portal.

=== Auburn ===
Jones transferred to play for the Auburn Tigers. In 2023–24, he averaged 9.1 points per game while shooting 41.8 percent from three. On February 11, 2025, Jones scored 21 points, while knocking down five threes in a win over Vanderbilt. On February 15, 2025, he dropped 16 points in a win over rival Alabama. For his performance during the 2024–25 season, Jones was named a semifinalist for Naismith Defensive Player of the Year Award.
