= Dimitrios Karadolamis =

Greek basketball player

Personal information
- Born: August 15, 1987 (age 39) Giannitsa, Greece
- Listed height: 6 ft 8.5 in (2.04 m)

Career information
- Playing career: 2004–present
- Position: Small forward / power forward

Career history
- 2004–2006: Aris
- 2006–2007: Makedonikos
- 2007–2008: Aris
- 2008–2009: AEL
- 2009–2010: Arkadikos
- 2010–2013: OFI Crete
- 2013–2015: Doxa Lefkadas
- 2015–2016: Irakleio
- 2016–2017: Koropi
- 2017–2019: Tritonas Sepolion
- 2019–present: OFI Crete

Career highlights
- Greek All-Star Game 3-Point Shootout Champion (2009)
Medals
Men's basketball
Representing Greece
Mediterranean Games
Silver medal – second place	2009 Pescara	Under-26

Dimitrios Karadolamis (alternate spelling: Dimitris) (Greek: Δημήτρης Καραδολάμης, born August 15, 1987) is a Greek professional basketball player. At a height of 2.04 m (6'8 1/2") tall, he can play at either the small forward or power forward position.

== Professional career ==
Karadolamis played with Aris in the EuroLeague, during the EuroLeague 2007–08 season. He was the Greek All-Star Game's 3-Point Shootout Champion in 2009.

== National team career ==
Karadolamis played with the Greek under-26 national team at the 2009 Mediterranean Games tournament, where he won a silver medal.
