= Tilemachos Vissariou =

Greek basketball player

No. 13 – Doxa Lefkadas
- Position: Small forward
- League: GBL

Personal information
- Born: January 28, 2002 (age 24) Larisa, Greece
- Listed height: 6 ft 6.5 in (1.99 m)
- Listed weight: 205 lb (93 kg)

Career information
- Playing career: 2019–present

Career history
- 2019–2021: Peristeri
- 2021–2022: Larisa
- 2022–2024: Apollon Patras
- 2024: Keravnos Strovolou
- 2024–2025: Aris Thessaloniki
- 2025: NE Megaridas
- 2025–2026: Prishtina
- 2026–present: Doxa Lefkadas

Tilemachos Vissariou (Greek: Τηλέμαχος Βησσαρίου; born January 28, 2002) is a Greek professional basketball player. He is a 1.99 m tall and 93 kg (205 lb.) small forward.

== Professional career ==
Vissariou played with the youth system program of Larisa Sports Academy before and Peristeri before starting his pro career in 2019. From 2019 to 2021, Vissariou played with Peristeri in the Greek Basket League, where he saw limited playing time.

In 2021, he joined Larisa and the following year, he joined Apollon Patras of the Greek Basket League.

On September 1, 2024, Vissariou joined Keravnos of the Cyprus Basketball Division 1.
