= Sakis Karidas =

Greek basketball player

Sakis Karidas Σάκης Καρύδας
Personal information
- Born: November 4, 1979 (age 47) Serres, Greece
- Listed height: 6 ft 1 in (1.85 m)
- Listed weight: 190 lb (86 kg)

Career information
- Playing career: 2003–2017
- Position: Point guard

Career history
- 2003–2005: Xanthi
- 2005–2007: ICBS
- 2007–2008: MENT
- 2008–2011: Ilysiakos
- 2011–2012: KAOD
- 2012–2014: Koroivos
- 2014–2015: Arkadikos
- 2015–2016: Doxa Lefkadas
- 2016–2017: Panionios

Career highlights
- Greek 2nd Division champion (2017); Greek 2nd Division MVP (2014); Greek League steals leader (2011)

Athanasios "Sakis" Karidas (alternate spelling: Karydas) (Greek: Αθανάσιος "Σάκης" Καρύδας; born November 4, 1979) is a Greek former professional basketball player. At a height of 6 ft 1 in (1.85 m) tall, he played at the point guard position.

== Professional career ==
Karidas began his pro career in 2003 with Xanthi. He then moved to ICBS in 2005. He next played with MENT, whom he joined in 2007. He then moved to Ilysiakos in 2008. In 2011, he signed with KAOD. In 2012, he moved to Koroivos.

In August 2014, he joined SEFA Arkadikos, after being selected as the Greek 2nd Division's MVP. He was a key player in helping SEFA Arkadikos earn promotion to the Greek 1st Division for the 2015–16 season. He is now the head Coach of the Greek Basketball Club AEB.
