= Goran Kalamiza =

Croaatian basketball player

Personal information
- Born: 5 February 1974 (age 52) Čakovec, SR Croatia, SFR Yugoslavia
- Listed height: 1.90 m (6 ft 3 in)

Career information
- Playing career: 1993–2008
- Position: Point guard

Career history
- 1993–1995: Franck
- 1995–1996: Cibona
- 1996–1998: Croatia Osiguranje/Split
- 1998–1999: Fenerbahçe
- 1999: Cibona
- 1999–2000: Zadar
- 2000–2001: Prokom Sopot
- 2001–2003: Polonia Warszawa
- 2003: Široki
- 2004: Peja
- 2004–2005: Cibona
- 2005–2006: Riesen Ludwigsburg
- 2006–2008: MENT BC Vassilakis

Career highlights
- 3× Croatian Cup winner (1996, 1997, 2000); Polish Cup winner (2001)

Goran Kalamiza (born 5 February 1974) is a retired Croatian professional basketball player. He played the point guard position.
