= Alexandros Nikolopoulos =

Alexandros Nikolopoulos may refer to:

- Alexandros Nikolopoulos (pentathlete) (born 1970), Greek modern pentathlete
- Alexandros Nikolopoulos (weightlifter) (born 1875), Greek weightlifter
