= Chris Papasarantou =

Greek–American basketball player

Personal information
- Born: April 3, 1966 (age 60) Oklahoma, U.S.
- Listed height: 6 ft 5 in (1.96 m)

Career information
- College: Oklahoma Baptist University (1985–1989)
- Playing career: 1989–1998
- Position: Small forward / Power forward (basketball)
- Number: 6

Career history
- 1989–1990: PAOK
- 1990–1991: Philippos Thessaloniki B.C.
- 1991–1995: AEK
- 1995–1996: Dafnis B.C.
- 1996–1998: Sporting B.C.

Christos "Chris" Papasarantou (Greek: Χρήστος "Κρις" Παπασαράντου; born April 3, 1966) is a former Greek–American professional basketball player.

== Professional career ==
Papasarantou graduated from Oklahoma Baptist University and he joined Greek basketball club PAOK, along with his cousin Pete Papahronis. After one year with PAOK, Papasarantou moved to Philippos Thessaloniki B.C. Papasarantou scored 19 points in Philippos' season-opening 111–90 win over Olympiacos B.C. Despite a promising start to the season Philippos was relegated, but Papasarantou was one of the best players in the club. In 1991, he joined AEK and stayed for four years. He played in the Greek Basketball Cup final in 1992 against Aris. During 1995–96 he played with Dafnis B.C. in the Greek A2 Basket League. He was one of the best scorers in the second division, with a career high of 39 points against Near East B.C. In 1996 he joined Sporting B.C., where he played for two years. After retirement from basketball, he became a car wash entrepreneur.

== Personal life ==
Papasarantou had a relationship with the former Miss Europe Marina Tsintikidou for four years. Today, he resides in Oklahoma City with his wife, Katerina Tsarouha Papasarantou, a successful portrait photographer, and their three children.
