= Panagiotis Vasilopoulos =

Greek basketball player (born 1984)

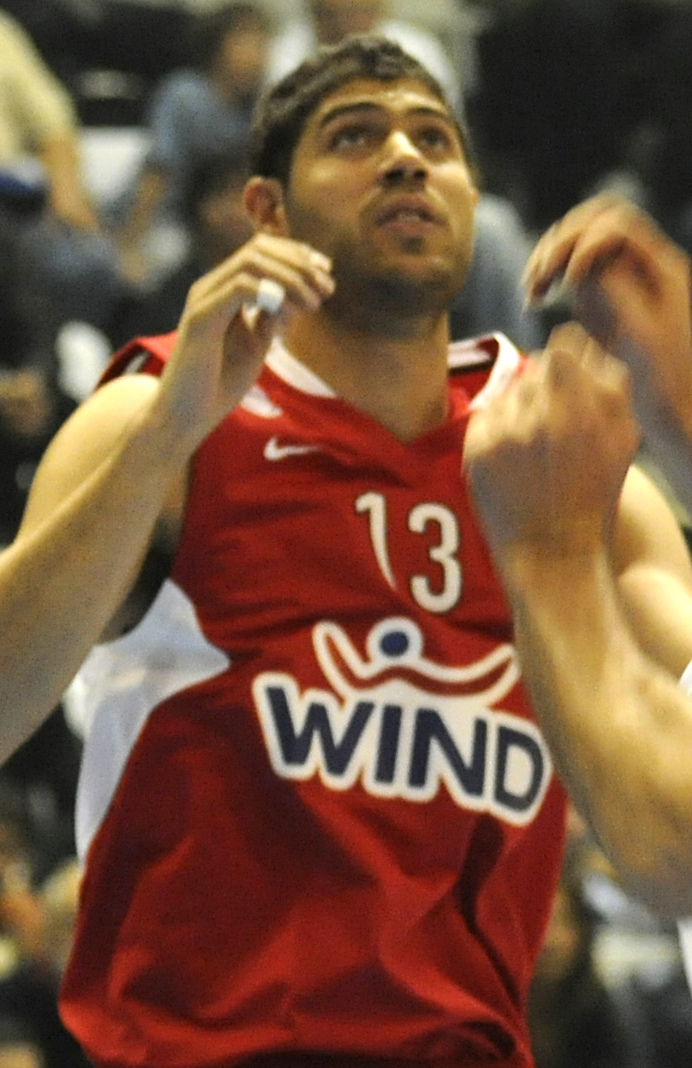
- Vasilopoulos, as a member of Olympiacos, in 2009.

Personal information
- Born: February 8, 1984 (age 42) Maroussi, North Athens, Greece
- Listed height: 6 ft 8.75 in (2.05 m)
- Listed weight: 235 lb (107 kg)

Career information
- NBA draft: 2006: undrafted
- Playing career: 2001–2021
- Position: Power forward / small forward
- Number: 8, 13, 21
- Coaching career: 2021–present

Career history

Playing
- 2001–2005: PAOK Thessaloniki
- 2005–2012: Olympiacos
- 2013: Valladolid
- 2014–2015: Ermis Piraeus
- 2015: Nea Kifissia
- 2015–2016: Koroivos Amaliadas
- 2016–2017: Kolossos Rodou
- 2017–2018: Aris Thessaloniki
- 2018: AEK Athens
- 2018–2021: Peristeri

Coaching
- 2021–2023: Peristeri (assistant)

Career highlights
- EuroLeague champion (2012); FIBA EuroStar (2007); FIBA Champions League champion (2018); Greek League champion (2012); 3× Greek Cup winner (2010, 2011, 2018); 2× All-Greek League Team (2007, 2019); 7× Greek All-Star (2005–2009, 2018, 2019)
Medals
| Event | 1st | 2nd | 3rd |
|---|---|---|---|
| FIBA World Cup | 0 | 1 | 0 |
| FIBA Stanković World Cup | 1 | 0 | 0 |
| FIBA EuroBasket | 1 | 0 | 0 |
| FIBA U21 World Cup | 0 | 1 | 0 |
| FIBA U19 World Cup | 0 | 0 | 1 |
| FIBA U-18 European Championship | 0 | 0 | 1 |
| Total | 2 | 2 | 2 |
Men's basketball
Representing Greece
FIBA World Cup
| Silver medal – second place | 2006 Japan | |
FIBA Stanković World Cup
| Gold medal – first place | 2006 China | |
FIBA EuroBasket
| Gold medal – first place | 2005 Serbia & Montenegro | |
FIBA U21 World Cup
| Silver medal – second place | 2005 Argentina | Under-21 |
FIBA U19 World Cup
| Bronze medal – third place | 2003 Greece | Under-19 |
FIBA Europe U18 Championship
| Bronze medal – third place | 2002 Germany | Under-18 |

Panagiotis Vasilopoulos, commonly known as Panos Vasilopoulos (alternate spellings: Panayiotis, Vassilopoulos) (Greek: Παναγιώτης "Πάνος" Βασιλόπουλος; born February 8, 1984) is a Greek former professional basketball player who last served as an assistant coach for Peristeri of the Greek Basket League and the Basketball Champions League, under head coach Vassilis Spanoulis. He is 2.05 m (6'8 3/4") tall. He played at both the small forward and power forward positions.

== Early years ==
Vasilopoulos was born in Maroussi, Athens, and grew up at his hometown of Ano Samiko Elis. He started to play basketball with the youth clubs of Ifitos Pyrgou. Later, he transferred to the youth clubs of Iraklis Pyrgou.

== Professional career ==
=== PAOK ===
Vasilopoulos began his pro career in 2001, with PAOK of the Greek League. He played with PAOK for four seasons, from 2001 to 2005. In the 2005 off season, he transferred from PAOK to joined Olympiacos Piraeus.

=== Olympiacos ===
Vasilopoulos was brought to Olympiacos in 2005, by George Garbolas, on a two-year contract. Garbolas believed in his abilities, and that he could help the team to win championships. On May 20, 2008, he extended his contract with Olympiacos for another 4 years, at a salary of €6 million net income. With Olympiacos, he won the EuroLeague and Greek League championships in 2012.

=== Injury plagued seasons ===
On February 8, 2012, Vasilopoulos suffered a season-ending leg injury, just after he had returned from a previous back surgery. He was released by Olympiacos. Vasilopoulos then signed with the Spanish League club Valladolid, in September 2013. He was released by Valladolid in December 2013, after suffering a knee injury.

=== Comeback from injuries ===
After being released by Valladolid in December 2013, Vasilopoulos then signed with the amateur level Greek club Ermis Piraeus, in April 2014. He then returned to play professionally again, in the Greek top-tier level GBL, with Nea Kifissia. Vasilopoulos then moved to the Greek club Koroivos, for the 2015–16 season.

Vasilopoulos next moved to the Greek club Kolossos Rodou, for the 2016–17 season. On July 26, 2017, Vasilopoulos signed with the Greek club Aris Thessaloniki, and played with them in the FIBA Champions League's 2017–18 season.

=== AEK Athens ===
On January 19, 2018, Vasilopoulos moved to AEK Athens, for the rest of the season. With AEK, he won the 2018 Final of the Greek Cup, as well as the FIBA Champions League championship.

=== Peristeri ===
On July 27, 2018, Vasilopoulos signed a 2-year contract with Peristeri of the Greek Basket League, where he eventually became the team captain. He averaged 7.1 points, 3.4 rebounds, 1.9 assists and 1.4 steals per game during the 2019–2020 season. On August 17, 2020, he re-signed with Peristeri. On August 20, 2021, he officially parted ways with the club after three seasons and retired from professional basketball.

In December 2021, Vasilopoulos joined the coaching staff of Milan Tomić in Peristeri. In July 2022, he renewed his contract and stayed on as an assistant to his former national squad and Olympiacos teammate Vassilis Spanoulis. On June 24, 2023, he parted ways with the club.

== National team career ==
=== Greek junior national team ===
Vasilopoulos played with Greek national junior teams at the 2004 FIBA Europe Under-20 Championship, and also at the 2005 FIBA Under-21 World Cup. With the Greek junior national teams, he also won the bronze medal at both the 2002 FIBA Europe Under-18 Championship, and at the 2003 FIBA Under-19 World Cup.

=== Greek senior national team ===
Vasilopoulos was a member of the senior men's Greek national basketball team that won the gold medal at the EuroBasket 2005, and the silver medal at the 2006 FIBA World Championship. He also competed with Greece at the EuroBasket 2007, the 2008 Summer Olympics, the 2019 FIBA European World Cup qualification, and the 2019 FIBA World Cup.

== Player profile ==
Early in his career, Vasilopoulos was compared to the long-time Olympiacos player Georgios Sigalas. He is a player that can play either the small forward or power forward positions, in both offense and defense. He can play in the post on offense, and can also pass well, and has 3 point range on his jump shot. In his playing prime, he was an excellent athlete, and was considered to be one of the best and most tenacious defensive players in Europe.

== Career statistics ==
Legend
| GP | Games played | GS | Games started | MPG | Minutes per game |
| FG% | Field-goal percentage | 3P% | 3-point field-goal percentage | FT% | Free-throw percentage |
| RPG | Rebounds per game | APG | Assists per game | SPG | Steals per game |
| BPG | Blocks per game | PPG | Points per game | PIR | Performance index rating |
| **Bold** | Career high |

=== EuroLeague ===
| Year | Team | GP | GS | MPG | FG% | 3P% | FT% | RPG | APG | SPG | BPG | PPG | PIR |
|---|---|---|---|---|---|---|---|---|---|---|---|---|---|
| 2005–06 | Olympiacos | 21 | 1 | **20.1** | **.482** | **.510** | .731 | **4.8** | **1.0** | .6 | .6 | **7.2** | **8.1** |
| 2006–07 | Olympiacos | **22** | **11** | 16.2 | .377 | .371 | **.781** | 3.3 | **1.0** | .6 | .6 | 5.4 | 3.8 |
| 2007–08 | Olympiacos | 18 | 7 | 19.7 | .416 | .340 | .520 | 2.7 | .7 | **.8** | .4 | 6.8 | 3.5 |
| 2008–09 | Olympiacos | 15 | 4 | 18.9 | .423 | .433 | .611 | 2.6 | .7 | .5 | **1.1** | 4.5 | 4.4 |
| 2009–10 | Olympiacos | 17 | 3 | 12.8 | .474 | .350 | .750 | 1.8 | .8 | .4 | .3 | 2.9 | 2.4 |
| 2010–11 | Olympiacos | 2 | 0 | 4.0 | .000 | — | .000 | .5 | — | — | .5 | 0.0 | -0.5 |
| Career | | 95 | 26 | 17.3 | .429 | .409 | .667 | 3.1 | .8 | .6 | .6 | 5.4 | 4.5 |

=== Domestic Leagues ===
==== Regular season ====
Note: Only games in the primary domestic competitions are included. Therefore, games in cup or European competitions are left out.

| Year | Team | League | GP | MPG | FG% | 3P% | FT% | RPG | APG | SPG | BPG | PPG |
|---|---|---|---|---|---|---|---|---|---|---|---|---|
| 2015–16 | Koroivos | GBL | 26 | 23.1 | .423 | .365 | .688 | 5.4 | 2.6 | 1.2 | .4 | 6.0 |
| 2016–17 | Kolossos Rodou | GBL | 26 | 27.1 | .391 | .329 | .698 | 5.9 | 2.0 | 1.1 | .5 | 7.7 |
| 2017–18 | Aris | GBL | 12 | 28.0 | .400 | .356 | .733 | 5.8 | 1.8 | 1.2 | .7 | 7.8 |
| 2017–18 | A.E.K. | GBL | 11 | 16.1 | .333 | .250 | .857 | 2.8 | .9 | .5 | .4 | 3.6 |
| 2018–19 | Peristeri | GBL | 26 | 29.1 | .429 | .382 | .804 | 4.8 | 2.5 | 1.0 | .6 | 9.4 |

=== FIBA Champions League ===
| † | Denotes seasons in which Panagiotis Vasilopoulos won the FIBA Champions League |

| Year | Team | GP | MPG | FG% | 3P% | FT% | RPG | APG | SPG | BPG | PPG |
|---|---|---|---|---|---|---|---|---|---|---|---|
| 2017–18 | Aris | 11 | 27.4 | .469 | .520 | .643 | 5.4 | 2.5 | .7 | 1.0 | 8.9 |
| 2017–18† | A.E.K. | 9 | 11.5 | .421 | .417 | .750 | 3.0 | .7 | .4 | .7 | 3.0 |
