= Philippos Thessaloniki B.C. =

Philippos Thessaloniki
- Full name: P.A.S. Philippos Thessaloniki
- Founded: 1947
- Location: Toumba, Thessaloniki, Greece
- Colours: Blue, White

Philippos Thessaloniki B.C. (full name PAS Phillipos Thessaloniki B.C.) is an athletic basketball sports club, that is based in the Agios Fanourios neighborhood of Toumba, Thessaloniki, Greece.

== History ==
The parent athletic club was founded in 1947. Its first name was Dafni, and the official colors of the team were green. Later, the team was renamed to Philippos, and adopted blue and white colors. During the 1988–89 season, Philippos played without any foreign players on its roster, and finished in last place in the top-tier level Greek Basket League, with just three victories. As a result, the team was relegated down to the Greek 2nd Division. During the 1990–91 season, Philippos again had three wins in the Greek Basket League, and was again relegated down to the Greek 2nd Division. In that season, Philippos was the fourth most important team in Thessaloniki, and they played their home games at Alexandreio Melathron Nick Galis Hall.

Dimitris Itoudis was Philippos' head coach during the 1997–98 season, in which the club finished in third place in the Greek 2nd Division. Two years later, the club was relegated down to the Greek 3rd Division. The club continued to decline in the following years, and in 2015, was relegated down to the Fourth Regional Division of Thessaloniki, which is the eighth-tier level of Greece.

== Titles and honors ==
- Greek 2nd Division North Group Champion: (1985–86)

== Notable players ==
Note: Flags indicate national team eligibility at FIBA-sanctioned events. Players may hold other non-FIBA nationalities not displayed.

Criteria

To appear in this section a player must have either:

- Set a club record or won an individual award while at the club
- Played at least one official international match for their national team at any time
- Played at least one official NBA match at any time.

- (Greece) Chronis Daskalakis
- (Greece) Christos Konstantinidis
- (Greece) Dimitris Oikonomidis
- (Greece) Babis Papadakis
- (Greece) Pantelis Papaioakeim
- (Greece) Vangelis Poulianitis
- (Greece) - (United States) Chris Papasarantou
- (United States) Herman Harried
- (United States) Boo Harvey

== Head coaches ==
- (Greece) Dimitris Itoudis
