= Nicolaides =

Nicolaides (Greek: Νικολαΐδης) is a Greek surname typically associated with the regions of Asia Minor and Pontus but also found across Macedonia and Thrace. Notable people with the surname include:

- Andrew Nicolaides (born 1938), British-Greek Cypriot surgeon
- Angelo Nicolaides (born 1957), South African Orthodox priest, academic, ethicist, theologian, historicist.
- Harry Nicolaides (born 1967/1968), Australian writer
- Kimon Nicolaides (1891–1938), Greek American art teacher, author and artist
- Kypros Nicolaides (born 1953), Greek-Cypriot maternal fetal medicine specialist
- Nicos Nicolaides (disambiguation):
  - Nicos Nicolaides (1884–1956), Greek painter and writer from Cyprus
  - Nicos Nicolaides (politician) (born 1953), Greek Cypriot politician
  - Nikos Nikolaidis (1939–2007), Greek film director and writer
- Steve Nicolaides, American film producer

== See also ==
- Nicolaides–Baraitser syndrome
