= Kenny Hall (basketball) =

American basketball player

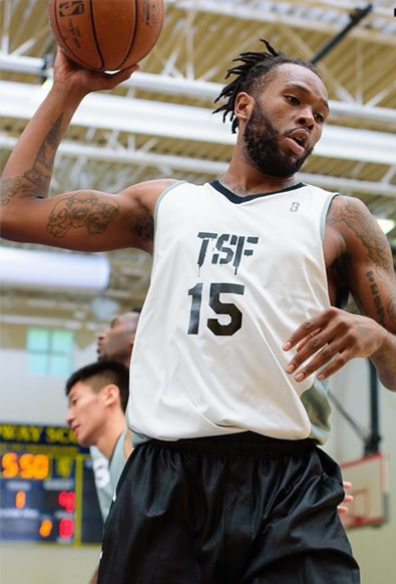

Personal information
- Born: April 10, 1990 (age 36) Los Angeles, California
- Listed height: 6 ft 9 in (2.06 m)
- Listed weight: 230 lb (104 kg)

Career information
- High school: Redan (Stone Mountain, Georgia)
- College: Tennessee (2009–2013)
- NBA draft: 2013: undrafted
- Playing career: 2013–2020
- Position: Power forward / center

Career history
- 2013–2014: Rieker Komárno
- 2014–2015: Delaware 87ers
- 2015: Santa Cruz Warriors
- 2016–2017: Koroivos Amaliadas
- 2017: ČEZ Nymburk
- 2017–2018: Maccabi Kiryat Motzkin
- 2018: Elitzur Yavne
- 2018–2019: Al Ahli
- 2019–2020: Balkan Botevgrad

Career highlights
- Czech League champion (2017); Czech Cup winner (2017); NBA D-League champion (2015)

Kenneth Michael Hall (born April 10, 1990) is an American former professional basketball player. He played college basketball at University of Tennessee with the Tennessee Volunteers from 2009 until 2013. Hall entered the 2013 NBA draft but was not selected in the draft's two rounds.

== High school career ==
Hall played high school basketball at Redan, where he was coached by Dalton Greene. He was rated by Scout.com as a four-star prospect, the No. 9 power forward in the country and the No. 29 overall prospect nationally in the class of 2009. As a junior at Redan in 2008, he averaged 25 points and 13 rebounds per game while leading the Raiders to a 14-win season. He also participated in the USA Basketball Under-18 Trials in Washington, D.C., during the summer of 2008. As a senior, Hall averaged 21 points and 10 rebounds in 2009, leading Redan to an 18–4 record and earning second-team Class 5A All-State honors.

College recruiting
Name	Hometown	School	Height	Weight	Commit date
Kenny Hall; PF	Stone Mountain	Redan (GE)	6 ft 9 in (2.06 m)	215 lb (98 kg)	Feb 3, 2008
Kenny Hall; PF	Recruit ratings: Scout: 247Sports:				
Overall recruit ranking:
Note: In many cases, Scout, Rivals, 247Sports, On3, and ESPN may conflict in their listings of height and weight.; In these cases, the average was taken. ESPN grades are on a 100-point scale.; Sources:

== College career ==
=== University of Tennessee ===
Hall played college basketball at University of Tennessee, with the Tennessee, from 2009 to 2013 under coach Bruce Pearl. He played in 35 games with three starts as a true freshman, averaging 3.6 points and 3.0 rebounds per game on the year and 4.6 points and 3.8 rebounds in SEC play. He led the team with a .578 field-goal percentage, including a team-best .617 shooting percentage in SEC play. During his second Volunteers campaign, he saw action in 25 games, with one start, averaging 2.0 points and 1.8 rebounds in 7.0 minutes per game while shooting .528 from the floor. As a junior, Hall led his team in blocks per game (1.0 bpg) and was UT's third-leading rebounder, having 4.5 per game. During his last year at the college as a senior, Hall appeared in 31 games with 21 starts averaging 5.6 points and 4.1 rebounds in 19.4 minutes per game.

== Professional career ==
After going undrafted in the 2013 NBA draft, Hall joined Rieker Komárno of the Slovak League. During his first professional season, he went to average 14.5 points and 6.7 rebounds and 0.5 blocks per game, being the best player of the team in terms of blocking shots.

The next year, Hall entered the 2014 NBA Development League Draft, being chosen by the Delaware 87ers in the 4th round with the 1st pick. On March 10, 2015, he was waived by 87ers, after averaging 7.3 points and 4.3 rebounds per game. On March 12, 2015, Hall was acquired by Santa Cruz Warriors. With Warriors, Hall won the NBA D-League championship on 2015.

On August 23, 2016, Hall joined Koroivos Amaliadas of the Greek Basket League. In 18 games, Hall went on to average 13.4 points 6.7 rebounds and 0.4 blocks per game, including a 25-point game against Kymis. His amazing performances draw the interest of other clubs, such as Pallacanestro Reggiana of the Lega Basket Serie A and Muratbey Uşak Sportif of the Turkish Super League. On February 11, 2017, Hall announced after a game against Kolossos Rodou in the Greek Basket League that he will join ČEZ Nymburk for the rest of the season.

On August 18, 2017, Hall signed with Faros Larissas of the Greek Basket League. On November 29, 2017, Hall joined Maccabi Kiryat Motzkin of the Israeli National League.
