= Charis Markopoulos =

Greek coach and former basketball player

Beijing Royal Fighters
- Title: Head coach
- League: CBA

Personal information
- Born: January 20, 1982 (age 44) Thessaloniki, Greece
- Listed height: 6 ft 2 in (1.88 m)
- Listed weight: 180 lb (82 kg)

Career information
- Playing career: 1999–2005
- Position: Point guard / shooting guard
- Coaching career: 2005–present

Career history

Playing
- 1999–2002: Iraklis Thessaloniki
- 2002–2003: Makedonikos Neapoli
- 2003–2004: P.A.O.K. Thessaloniki
- 2004–2005: Xanthi

Coaching
- 2005–2006: P.A.O.K. Thessaloniki (assistant)
- 2006–2007: Iraklis Thessaloniki
- 2008–2009: Aris Thessaloniki (assistant)
- 2009–2014: P.A.O.K. Thessaloniki (assistant)
- 2014–2016: Koroivos Amaliada
- 2016–2017: Doxa Lefkada
- 2017–2022: Beijing Ducks (assistant)
- 2022–2023: Promitheas Patra (assistant)
- 2024–2025: Iraklis
- 2025–2026: Ningbo Rockets
- 2026–present: Beijing Royal Fighters

Career highlights
- As a player: Greek Under-18 Championship champion (1998); AST World Under-18 Tournament MVP (1998)
Medals
Men's basketball
Representing Greece
AST World Under-18 Tournament
Silver medal – second place	2000 Mannheim	Under-18
FIBA Under-18 EuroBasket
Bronze medal – third place	2000 Croatia	Under-18

Charalampis "Charis" Markopoulos (alternate spellings: Charalabis, Haralampis, Haralabis, Haris) (Greek: Χαραλάμπης "Χάρης" Μαρκόπουλος; born January 20, 1982) is a Greek former professional basketball player, and current head coach for the Beijing Royal Fighters of the Chinese Basketball Association (CBA).

== Early life and youth career ==
Markopoulos began playing the sport of basketball with the youth system of Iraklis Thessaloniki, in Greece. He was considered to be one of the most talented youth players of his generation in Europe, and was considered by some basketball analysts to possibly be the next Nikos Galis. With Iraklis' Under-18 junior club, along with his teammate Lazaros Papadopoulos, Markopoulos won the Greek Under-18 Championship, during the 1997–98 season.

Markopoulos also won the bronze medal with Greece, at the 2000 FIBA Under-18 EuroBasket. He also won the silver medal with Greece at the 2000 AST World Under-18 Tournament, where he was named the MVP of the tournament, after leading Greece to a win over Team USA, in the tournament's semifinals. After that, Markopoulos was recruited to play college basketball in the NCAA Division I, by the University of North Carolina. However, Markopoulos opted instead to stay in Greece.

== Professional career ==
Markopoulos played professional club basketball with the Greek top-tier level Greek Basket League clubs Iraklis Thessaloniki, Makedonikos Neapolis, and PAOK Thessaloniki. He also played in the European 2nd-tier level FIBA Saporta Cup competition, during the 1999–00 season, and in the European top-tier level, FIBA SuproLeague competition, during the 2000–01 season, as a member of Iraklis.

Markopoulos' basketball playing career ended prematurely, due to complications from Guillain–Barré syndrome, that he suffered while he played with Iraklis. At age 19, due to the illness, Markopoulos became paralyzed, during a flight from Thessaloniki to Luleå, on 7 February 2001. Markopoulos eventually recovered the ability to move, and was able to play basketball again. However, after that, his playing career was greatly negatively affected, and he was no longer the same level of player that he had been previously. At the age of 23, he retired from playing professional basketball, after competing with Xanthi, in the Greek 2nd Division, during the 2004–05 season.

== National team career ==
Markopoulos was a member of the junior national teams of Greece. With Greece's Under-18 junior national team, he won the bronze medal at the 2000 FIBA Under-18 EuroBasket. He averaged 13.6 points, 5.1 rebounds, and 4.5 assists per game at the tournament.

He also won the silver medal at the 2000 Albert Schweitzer World Under-18 Tournament, where he was named to the All-Tournament Team, and was also named the MVP of the tournament. In the AST's semifinals, Markopoulos led Greece to a win over Team USA.

== Coaching career ==
After he retired from playing professional club basketball, Markopoulos became a professional basketball coach. He became the head coach of the Greek Basket League club Koroivos Amaliadas in 2014. In 2016, he became the head coach of the Greek club Doxa Lefkadas.

== Personal life ==
Markopoulos' father, Soulis, was a professional basketball player and coach and was inducted into the Greek League Hall of Fame, as a coach, in 2023.
