= Boo Harvey =

American basketball player (born 1966)

Personal information
- Born: October 1, 1966 (age 60) Queens, New York, U.S.
- Listed height: 5 ft 11 in (1.80 m)
- Listed weight: 165 lb (75 kg)

Career information
- High school: Andrew Jackson (Queens, New York)
- College: San Jacinto (1985–1987); St. John's (1987–1990)
- NBA draft: 1990: undrafted
- Position: Point guard
- Number: 3

Career history
- 1990–1991: Philippos Thessaloniki
- 1991–1992: HoNsU
- 1992–1995: Trodat

Career highlights
- Austrian League All-Star Game MVP (1995); First-team All-Big East (1990); Haggerty Award (1990); Frances Pomeroy Naismith Award (1990); NJCAA champion (1986); Fourth-team Parade All-American (1985)

Greg "Boo" Harvey (born October 1, 1966) is an American former basketball player who is best known for his collegiate career at St. John's University between 1987–88 and 1989–90. He starred as the point guard for the Redmen, and as a senior was the recipient of both the Frances Pomeroy Naismith Award and Haggerty Award.

== Early life ==
Harvey was born in Queens, New York. He made a name for himself on the courts in New York City, throughout the Amateur Athletic Union (AAU) circuit, and at Andrew Jackson High School. Harvey started as a freshman, and in his four-year career he led AJHS to an 88–7 record. They reached the city finals three times and were champions once. Harvey averaged 38 points per game as a senior in 1984–85 and finished his career with a school record 2,039 points. This record cannot be broken due to Andrew Jackson High School's closure in 1994.

== College ==
=== San Jacinto ===
After high school, Harvey wanted to attend Syracuse University to play basketball. His poor academic performance, however, prevented him from being allowed to enroll. In order to boost his grades to qualify for academic eligibility, Harvey decided to play junior college basketball at San Jacinto College in Pasadena, Texas.

In his two seasons at San Jacinto, a national powerhouse in men's basketball, the team won back-to-back Region XIV titles and compiled an overall record of 73–1. In 1985–86, Harvey's freshman year, they became the fourth team in NJCAA history to go undefeated and win the national championship.

=== St. John's ===
After his stint in Texas, Harvey went back to Queens in 1987. He said that the time spent away from home made him homesick, which is why he decided to attend St. John's University instead of Syracuse. The school is located in Queens, making the decision easy for him. Harvey also admitted that St. John's did not recruit him while he was in high school because they already had Mark Jackson at the point guard position. By the time he returned in 1987, the Redmen had a spot available for him, so he jumped on the opportunity.

Harvey started as a junior in 1987–88. He averaged 11.9 and 4.8 assists in 27 games played, but failed to show any shooting range, connecting on only 15-of-39 three-point attempts. Harvey did not thrive playing in a half-court offense, something he later said he found difficult to do.

In what should have been his senior season in 1988–89, Harvey was forced to sit out due to academic ineligibility from the year before. He was also suspended for one game by the NCAA for playing in an unsanctioned summer league game. A referee was killed by a player toward the end of that game over a disputed call. Despite being forced to miss the season, Harvey retained his NCAA athlete eligibility to finish his career the following year. He also credited his year off as a catalyst for his understanding of how to run a half-court offense by being forced to watch it daily.

Entering his final season in 1989–90, Harvey was Sport Magazine's 12th-ranked senior point guard in the country. Towards the end of the season, however, he had climbed as high as third on the list. When fellow senior teammate Jayson Williams went down with an injury, Harvey stepped up and averaged 23.4 points and shot 20-of-44 from three-point range. Earlier in the season, he hit three buzzer-beating, game-winning shots: beating DePaul, 55–54 on November 22; beating Georgetown 63–62 on February 21; and beating Pittsburgh, 76–75 on February 26. He also increased his scoring average to 16.5 points while leading the Redmen to a 24–10 overall record. They made it to the Round of 32 in the NCAA Tournament before losing to Duke. Harvey was honored with both the Frances Pomeroy Naismith Award, which is given to the best men's basketball player who is 6 ft 0 in (1.83 m) or shorter, and the Haggerty Award, given to the best male collegiate basketball player in the greater New York City area.

== Professional ==
Despite a standout college career, Harvey was not drafted by the National Basketball Association, nor did he ever make a final roster. Harvey played in Greece for Philippos Thessaloniki during the 1990–91 season; in Jyvaskyla, Finland for HoNsU B.C. during the 1991–92 season; and in Wels, Austria for Trodat B.C. from 1992 to 1995, where he was the 1995 MVP of the Austrian League All-Star game.
