= Olympia Chopsonidou =

Greek model (born 1983)

Olympia Chopsonidou Ολυμπία Χοψονίδου
- Born: Olympia Chopsonidou; 17 June 1983 (age 43); Krasnodar, Russian Soviet Federative Socialist Republic, USSR
- Height: 1.81 m (5 ft 11 1/4 in)
- Beauty pageant titleholder
- Hair color: Brown
- Eye color: Brown

Olympia Chopsonidou (Greek: Ολυμπία Χοψονίδου): born 17 June 1983) is a Greek model and beauty pageant titleholder. In April 2006, Chopsonidou won the title of Star Hellas, and she then represented Greece at the Miss Universe 2006 pageant, which was held in Los Angeles, California.

== Biography ==
Chopsonidou was born on 17 June 1983, in Krasnodar, Russian Soviet Federative Socialist Republic, USSR, to Greek parents Emilia and Vasilis Chopsonidis. Along with her three siblings, Tasos (born 1981), Valeria (born 1988), and Giannis (born 1989), Chopsonidou grew up, in their family's place of origin (Thessaloniki, Greece), but when she turned 18 years old, she moved to Athens, Greece, where she studied fashion design. Along with her studies, Chopsonidou began to work as a model, with the Cristi Krana Model Agency.

Chopsonidou won the title of Star Hellas in 2006. After that, she represented Greece at the Miss Universe 2006 pageant, in Los Angeles, California, USA.

== Personal life ==
In December 2009, Chopsonidou married Greek professional basketball player Vassilis Spanoulis, with a civil marriage, and on 24 June 2011, the couple had a religious marriage. Together, the couple have six children: Thanasis Spanoulis (born 2 January 2010), Vassilis Spanoulis Jr. (5 April 2012), Dimitris Spanoulis (5 June 2013), Emilia Spanouli (3 August 2015), Anastasia Spanouli (25 September 2017) and Alexandra Spanouli (January 20, 2020). Chopsonidou is also the sister-in-law of the former Greek professional basketball player Dimitris Spanoulis.
