= Nicos Nicolaides (disambiguation) =

Nicos Nicolaides, Nikos Nikolaides or Nikos Nikolaidis (Greek: Νίκος Νικολαΐδης) may refer to:

- Nicos Nicolaides (1884–1956), Greek painter and writer from Cyprus
- Nicos Nicolaides (politician) (born 1953), Greek Cypriot politician
- Nikos Nikolaidis (1939–2007), Greek film director and writer
