= Nikos Nicolaou =

Nikos Nicolaou may refer to:

- Nikos Nikolaou, Greek sculptor
- Nikos Nikolaou (rower), Greek Olympic rower
- Nikos Nicolaou (footballer, born 1973), Cypriot footballer for Anorthosis Famagusta and Nea Salamis
- Nikos Nicolaou (footballer, born 1978), Cypriot footballer for Nea Salamis
