= Doxa Lefkadas B.C. =

Doxa Lefkadas Δόξα Λευκάδας
- Leagues: GBL; Greek Cup
- Founded: 1982
- Arena: Lefkada Indoor Hall
- Capacity: 1,614
- Location: Lefkada City, Greece
- Team colors: Blue and White
- President: George Giannoulas
- Head coach: Thodoris Terzis
- Website: doxalefkadas.gr
Home	Away

Doxa Lefkadas B.C., or simply Doxa B.C., is a professional basketball club that is located on the island of Lefkada, in Lefkada City, Greece. The team currently plays in the Greek Basketball League.

== History ==
The parent athletic club Doxa Lefkadas, was founded in 1981. The men's basketball team was then founded in 1982. The club first played in a national division in 1987, when it played in the 4th-tier level Greek C Basket League. The team won the 4th-tier Greek C Basket League in 2010, thus earning a promotion to the 3rd-tier level Greek B Basket League.

Doxa Lefkadas competed in the Greek Cup for the first time, in the 2010–11 season. For the 2011–12 season, Iraklis Thessaloniki declined its place in the 2nd-tier level Greek A2 Basket League, and Doxa Lefkadas replaced it in the league. For the 2012–13 season, the club finished in last place in the Greek A2 League, and was thus demoted back down to the 3rd-tier Greek B League.

In the 2013–14 season, Doxa Lefkadas won the North Group of the Greek B Basket League, and they were promoted back up to the Greek A2 League. In the 2015–16 season, the team finished in 6th place in the Greek A2 League.

For the 2016–17 season, the club was granted a wildcard to play in the top-tier level Greek Basket League for the first time.

After 9 years, on 2026, Doxa returned to the Greek Basket League, after being crowned the Greek A2's champion.

== Arena ==
Doxa Lefkadas plays their home games at the 1,200 seat Lefkada Indoor Hall. In 2016, the arena was upgraded, renovated, and more seating was added, in order to meet Greek Basket League standards.

== Season by season ==
Season	Tier	Division	Pos.	Greek Cup	European competitions
2011–12	2	A2 Basket League	9th		
2012–13	2	A2 Basket League	14th		
2013–14	3	B Basket League	1st		
2014–15	2	A2 Basket League	7th		
2015–16	2	A2 Basket League	6th (Note: Received a wild card invitation for the Greek Basket League.)		
2016–17	1	Basket League	14th		
2017–18	2	A2 Basket League	6th		
2018–19	4	C Basket League			
2019–20	3	B Basket League	3rd		
2020–21	3	B Basket League	— (Note: Season cancelled due to the COVID-19 pandemic.)		
2021–22	3	B Basket League	5th		
2022–23	3	B Basket League	3rd		
2023–24	2	Elite League	11th		
2024–25	2	Elite League	9th		
2025–26	2	Elite League	1st		
2026–27	1	Basket League			

== Roster ==
Note: Flags indicate national team eligibility at FIBA-sanctioned events. Players may hold other non-FIBA nationalities not displayed.

Doxa Lefkadas roster
Players
Coaches

Pos.	No.	Nat.	Name	Ht.	Wt.	Age
SG	0	(United States)	Jones, Denver	1.93 m (6 ft 4 in)	93 kg (205 lb)	25 – 2 November 2000
SG	1	(United States)	Robinson, Trey	1.98 m (6 ft 6 in)	100 kg (220 lb)	24 – 9 March 2002
PG	2	(United States)	Harmon, De'Vion	1.88 m (6 ft 2 in)	91 kg (201 lb)	25 – 22 January 2001
SF	3	(United States)	Parrish, Micah	1.98 m (6 ft 6 in)	82 kg (181 lb)	25 – 17 February 2001
F/C	6	(Greece)	Tsairelis, Michalis	2.08 m (6 ft 10 in)	111 kg (245 lb)	38 – 23 February 1988
SF	7	(Greece)	Arsenopoulos, Nikos	1.98 m (6 ft 6 in)	91 kg (201 lb)	26 – 19 May 2000
G	8	(Greece)	Poulianitis, Marios	1.93 m (6 ft 4 in)	88 kg (194 lb)	26 – 29 November 1999
C	9	(Greece)	Sachpatzidis, Ioannis	2.09 m (6 ft 10 in)	109 kg (240 lb)	33 – 29 September 1993
SF	11	(Greece)	Chatzinikolas, Ioannis	1.99 m (6 ft 6 in)	93 kg (205 lb)	31 – 7 October 1995
C	13	(Greece)	Vissariou, Tilemachos	2.00 m (6 ft 7 in)	109 kg (240 lb)	24 – 28 January 2002
C	20	(United States)	Sharma, Josh	2.13 m (7 ft 0 in)	104 kg (229 lb)	30 – 28 September 1996
SF	22	(Greece)	Fytros, Ioannis	1.98 m (6 ft 6 in)		22 – 21 January 2004
PF	23	(United States)	Gant, JaKeenan	2.03 m (6 ft 8 in)	98 kg (216 lb)	30 – 6 May 1996

Head coach

- (Greece) Thodoris Terzis

Assistant coach(es)

- (Greece)

Team manager

- (Greece) Dimitrios Tsaldaris

Legend

- (C) Team captain
- Injured

- Roster
Updated: August 29, 2026

=== Depth chart ===
Pos.	Starting 5	Bench 1	Bench 2
C	Josh Sharma	Giannis Sachpatzidis
PF	JaKeenan Gant	Michalis Tsairelis
SF	Micah Parrish	Nikos Arsenopoulos	Tilemachos Vissariou
SG	Trey Robinson	Denver Jones	Ioannis Fytros
PG	De'Vion Harmon	Giannis Chatzinikolas	Marios Poulianitis

== Notable players ==
Note: Flags indicate national team eligibility at FIBA-sanctioned events. Players may hold other non-FIBA nationalities not displayed.

Criteria

To appear in this section a player must have either:

- Set a club record or won an individual award while at the club
- Played at least one official international match for their national team at any time
- Played at least one official NBA match at any time.

- Georgios Apostolidis
- Vangelis Sklavos
- Alexis Kyritsis
- Andreas Kanonidis
- Dimitris Tsaldaris
- Sakis Karidas
- Stelios Ioannou
- Georgios Diamantopoulos
- Nikos Pettas
- Giannis Kyriakopoulos
- Ioannis Demertzis
- Ioannis Psathas
- Georgios Georgakis
- Christos Tapoutos
- Dimitris Legkikas
- Ioannis Sachpatzidis
- Ioannis Chatzinikolas
- Ivan Maraš
- David Doblas
- Justin Robinson
- Shannon Scott
- Melsahn Basabe
- Dez Wells
- Eli Carter
- Ty Abbott
- Alex Harris

== Head coaches ==
- Makis Giatras: (2008–2009)
- Dimitris Papadopoulos: (2012–2013)
- Vangelis Ziagkos: (2014–2015)
- Charis Markopoulos: (2016–2017)
