= Alexandros Nikolopoulos (pentathlete) =

Greek modern pentathlete (born 1970)

Personal information
- Born: 20 October 1970 (age 55) Athens, Greece

Sport
- Sport: Modern pentathlon

Alexandros Nikolopoulos (born 20 October 1970) is a Greek modern pentathlete. He competed at the 1992 Summer Olympics.
