= Koroivos B.C. =

Koroivos
- Leagues: Greek 2nd division Greek Cup
- Founded: 1983; 43 years ago
- History: Koroivos B.C. (1983–present)
- Arena: Amaliada Ilida Indoor Hall
- Capacity: 2,000
- Location: Amaliada, Greece
- Team colors: Black, White, Blue
- President: Georgios Paraskevopoulos
- Head coach: Giannis Manos
- Website: koroivosbc.gr
Home	Away

Koroivos B.C. or Koroivos Amaliadas B.C. (alternate spellings: Koroibos Amaliada) (Greek: Κόροιβος Αμαλιάδας KAE), is a Greek professional basketball club that is based in Amaliada, Greece. The club's full name is Athlitikos Syllogos Amaliadas Koroivos (Αθλητικός Σύλλογος Αμαλιάδας Κόροιβος), which is also abbreviated as A.S.A. Koroivos (Α.Σ.Α. Κόροιβος) and it maintains different sport departments. The club's name is in honour of the first stadion race winner of the Ancient Olympic Games, Coroebus of Elis.

== Club branding ==
(until 2015)

(2015–present)

== History ==
The parent athletic club of Koroivos was founded in 1982, and the club's basketball section was founded in 1983. In 2010, Koroivos merged with Xanthi and gained Xanthi's club rights, and also took their place in the Greek 2nd Division during the 2010–11 season. Koroivos also took AEK Athens' place in the Greek 2nd Division during the 2012–13 season.

Koroivos finished in 2nd place in the Greek 2nd Division in the 2013–14 season, after Sakis Karidas hit a 3 pointer at the end of the game against Kavala, to give Koroivos a 58 to 57 win in the next to last game of the season. The club thus gained promotion to play in the top Greek League for the first time in the 2014–15 season.

== Arenas ==
Koroivos plays their home games at the 2,000 seat Amaliada Ilida Indoor Hall.

== Season by season ==
Season	Tier	Division	Pos.	W–L	Greek Cup	European competitions
2013–14	2	A2 Basket League	2nd	22–4		
2014–15	1	Basket League	8th	11–17		
2015–16	1	Basket League	12th	8–18		
2016–17	1	Basket League	11th	8–18		
2017–18	1	Basket League	13th	7–19		
2018–19	2	A2 Basket League	12th	13–17		
2019–20	2	A2 Basket League	15th	7–13		

== Roster ==
*Player(Last Team)

Devin Davis (Astros - MEX), Alfis Pilavios (AEK), Kyriakos Petanidis (Panerythraikos), Dimitris Markou (Apollon), Georgios Kalianiotis (Near East), Alexandros Kokorelis (Ikaroi Trikala), Vasileios Adamopoulos RJ Glasper (Ashkelon - ISR), Dionysios Tataris (Ikaroi Trikala), Panagiotis Vyrlas (Esperos L.), Alexios Katzos (Filippos Veroias), Christos Vassilakos (Dominican, IL - USA), Xaris Paraskevopoulos (Koroivos BC)*

Coach: Ioannis Manos

Assistant Coach: Georgios Leventouris

Note: Flags indicate national team eligibility at FIBA-sanctioned events. Players may hold other non-FIBA nationalities not displayed.

== Notable players ==
Note: Flags indicate national team eligibility at FIBA-sanctioned events. Players may hold other non-FIBA nationalities not displayed.

Criteria

To appear in this section a player must have either:

- Set a club record or won an individual award while at the club
- Played at least one official international match for their national team at any time
- Played at least one official NBA match at any time.

Greece:

- Tasos Charismidis
- Dimitris Charitopoulos
- Georgios Galiotos
- Michalis Giannakidis
- Sotiris Gioulekas
- Nikos Kaklamanos
- Andreas Kanonidis
- Sakis Karidas
- Marios Matalon
- Petros Noeas
- Nikos Pettas
- Panagiotis Vasilopoulos

Europe:

- Aleksandar Ćapin
- Fedor Dmitriev
- Andreja Milutinović
- - Obie Trotter
- - Devon van Oostrum
- Saša Vasiljević

USA:

- Ken Brown
- Vincent Council
- Dwayne Davis
- Toddrick Gotcher
- Kenny Hall
- - Darrell Harris
- Robert Lowery
- Josh Magette
- Devonta Pollard

Africa:

- - Darrius Garrett
- Harding Nana

Oceania:

- Corey Webster

== Head coaches ==
- Charis Markopoulos
- Dinos Kalampakos
