= Andreas Kanonidis =

Greek professional basketball player

Andreas Kanonidis Ανδρέας Κανονίδης
Personal information
- Born: July 26, 1991 (age 35) Maroussi, Athens, Greece
- Listed height: 6 ft 7 in (2.01 m)
- Listed weight: 215 lb (98 kg)

Career information
- Playing career: 2008–present
- Position: Small forward / power forward

Career history
- 2008–2010: Panionios
- 2010–2011: Ilysiakos
- 2012: Maroussi
- 2012–2013: Peristeri
- 2013–2014: Rethymno
- 2014–2015: Koroivos
- 2015–2016: Doxa Lefkadas
- 2016–2017: Doukas
- 2017–2019: Ionikos Nikaias
- 2019–2020: Dafni Dafniou
- 2020–2022: Amyntas
- 2022–2023: Palaio Faliro
- 2023–2024: Milon
- 2024–2025: Mykonos

Career highlights
- 3x Greek A2 Elite League champion (2019, 2024, 2025); All-Greek A2 Elite League Team (2025); Greek 3rd Division champion (2018)

Andreas Kanonidis (Greek: Ανδρέας Κανονίδης; born July 26, 1991) is a Greek professional basketball player. He is 2.01 m (6 ft 7 in) tall and he can play at both the small forward and power forward positions.

== Professional career ==
Kanonidis started playing basketball with the Asteria Thessaloniki and Panionios Athens youth teams in Greece. He began his professional career during the 2008–09 season, with the Greek League club Panionios. In 2010, he moved to Ilysiakos and then in 2012, he joined Maroussi.

He then played with Peristeri, before moving to Rethymno, and then Koroivos.

On August 24, 2015, he signed with the Greek 2nd Division club Doxa Lefkadas. In 2017, he joined the Greek 3rd Division club Ionikos Nikaias, where he achieved subsequent 3rd Division and 2nd Division championships and promotions in the two seasons he spent with them.

In 2019, Kanonidis signed with Dafni Dafniou. He averaged 15.8 points, 8.6 rebounds, 2.8 assists and 1.3 steals per game. Kanonidis signed with Amyntas on September 12, 2020. He averaged 16 points, 9.7 rebounds, 2.7 assists and 1.1 steals per game. Kanonidis re-signed with the team on August 29, 2021.

== National team career ==
Kanonidis played with the junior national basketball teams of Greece. With Greece's junior national teams, he played at the 2007 FIBA Europe Under-16 Championship, the 2009 FIBA Europe Under-18 Championship, and the 2011 FIBA Europe Under-20 Championship.
