= Dimitrios Spanoulis =

Greek basketball player

Dimitris Spanoulis Δημήτρης Σπανούλης
Personal information
- Born: October 11, 1979 (age 47) Larissa, Greece
- Listed height: 6 ft 3.75 in (1.92 m)
- Listed weight: 215 lb (98 kg)

Career information
- Playing career: 2001–2016
- Position: Point guard / shooting guard

Career history
- 2001–2004: Gymnastikos S. Larissas
- 2004–2005: Makedonikos
- 2005–2006: Gymnastikos S. Larissas
- 2006–2007: Xanthi
- 2007–2008: MENT
- 2008–2009: Olympias Patras
- 2011–2012: Foinikas Larissa
- 2015–2016: G.S. Larissas 1928

Career highlights
- Greek 2nd Division Top Scorer (2007)

Dimitrios Spanoulis (alternate spelling: Dimitris, Dimitri) (Greek: Δημήτρης Σπανούλης; born October 11, 1979) is a Greek former professional basketball player. During his playing career, at a height of 6 ft 3 3/4 in (1.92 m) tall, he played at both the point guard and shooting guard positions on the basketball court.

== Professional career ==
Spanoulis started his professional club career playing with the Greek basketball club Gymnastikos S. Larissas in the 2001–02 season. He later transferred to several other Greek teams including: Makedonikos, Xanthi, MENT, and Olympias Patras.

Spanoulis reached the European-wide 2nd-tier level EuroCup's championship game, with Makedonikos, during the 2004–05 season. He led the Greek Second Division in scoring, with Xanthi, during the 2006–07 season, with a scoring average of 27.4 points per game. As a result, he was voted to the Eurobasket.com website's Greek 2nd Division All-Domestic Team, All-League First Team, Domestic Player of the Year, Guard of the Year, and Player of the Year.

Spanoulis was offered contracts by several Spanish Second Division teams, prior to the 2007–08 season, but he was unable to accept them, as he could not leave Greece at the time. He signed with G.S. Larissas 1928 in 2015, after having not played professional club basketball since 2012. He retired from playing pro club basketball in November 2016, at the age of 37.

== Personal life ==
Spanoulis was born in Larissa, Greece. He is the elder brother of the Greek basketball star Vassilis Spanoulis, who was a long-time member of the senior men's Greek national team and the EuroLeague club Olympiacos Piraeus, and who also played with the NBA's Houston Rockets. Dimitrios competed against Vassilis in the European-wide 2nd-tier level EuroCup competition, in the 2004–05 season, when he played with Makedonikos, and his younger brother, Vassilis, played with Maroussi Athens. In Greek basketball, the two were nicknamed "The Spanoulis Brothers".

He is also the brother-in-law of the Greek super model Olympia Chopsonidou.
