= Dimitris Papadopoulos (basketball coach) =

Greek professional basketball coach

Personal information
- Born: 27 July 1971 (age 55)
- Position: Head coach
- Coaching career: 2000–present

Career history

Coaching
- 2000–2007: Panathinaikos Athens (assistant)
- 2005–2008: Greece (assistant)
- 2007: AEL Limassol (assistant)
- 2007: APOEL
- 2007–2010: Apollon Patras
- 2010–2011: Pagrati Athens
- 2011–2012: AEK Athens
- 2012–2013: Aris Thessaloniki (assistant)
- 2013–2014: Doxa Lefkadas
- 2015–2016: Apollon Limassol
- 2016: Étoile Sportive du Sahel
- 2016–2017: Trepça
- 2017–2018: Apollon Patras
- 2019–2020: Étoile Sportive du Sahel
- 2020–2021: ETHA Engomis
- 2021–2022: Agriniou
- 2022–present: Lefkippos Xanthis

Career highlights
- Tunisian Cup winner (2016)

Dimitris Papadopoulos (born 27 July 1971) is a Greek professional basketball coach. During his club coaching career, Papadopoulos has coached in Greece, Cyprus, Tunisia, and Kosovo.

== Coaching career ==
Papadopoulos started his basketball club coaching career with the Greek League club Panathinaikos Athens, where he worked as an assistant of Željko Obradović. After seven years at Panathinaikos, he moved to the Cypriot League club AEL Limassol. During his coaching career, he has also coached numerous Greek clubs, such as: Apollon Patras, Pagrati Athens, AEK Athens, Doxa Lefkadas, and Aris Thessaloniki. He also coached the Cypriot club Apollon Limassol, the Tunisian League club Étoile Sportive du Sahel, and the Kosovo League club Trepça.

In 2017, Papadopoulos returned to the Greek club Apollon Patras. Papadopoulos was also an assistant coach of the senior men's Greek national team, from 2005 to 2008.
