= Michalis Giannakidis =

Michalis Giannakidis Μιχάλης Γιαννακίδης
PAOK
- Title: Team manager
- League: Greek Basket League

Personal information
- Born: 6 April 1988 (age 38) Thessaloniki, Greece
- Listed height: 6 ft 3.75 in (1.92 m)
- Listed weight: 210 lb (95 kg)

Career information
- Playing career: 2006–2022
- Position: Shooting guard

Career history
- 2006–2008: MENT
- 2008–2012: PAOK
- 2012–2013: Ikaros Kalitheas
- 2013–2014: Trikala Aries
- 2014–2015: Koroivos Amaliadas
- 2015–2016: Kavala
- 2016–2019: Iraklis
- 2019–2020: Agrinio
- 2021–2022: Navarchos Votsis

Michalis Giannakidis (alternate spellings: Michail, Mihalis) (Greek: Μιχάλης Γιαννακίδης; born 6 April 1988) is a Greek professional basketball player and current basketball executive. During his club playing career, at a height of is 1.92 m (6'3 3/4") tall, he played at the shooting guard position.

== Professional career ==
Giannakidis began his professional club career in the Greek Second Division with MENT, during the 2006–07 season. He moved to the Greek First Division club PAOK, before the 2008–09 season. In 2012, he moved to the Greek club Ikaros, where he played in 27 games. In 2013, he joined the Greek club Trikala Aries.

In 2014, he moved to the Greek club Koroivos, and in October 2015, he moved to the Greek club Kavala. He finished his playing career with the Greek clubs Iraklis and Agrinio. He retired from playing pro club basketball in 2020.

== National team career ==
With Greece's junior national teams, Giannakidis played at the following tournaments: the 2004 FIBA Europe Under-16 Championship, the 2005 FIBA Europe Under-18 Championship, the 2006 FIBA Europe Under-18 Championship, the 2007 FIBA Europe Under-20 Championship, and the 2008 FIBA Europe Under-20 Championship.

== Managerial career ==
After he ended his basketball playing career, Giannakis began working as a basketball executive. He became the Team Manager of the Greek club PAOK Thessaloniki, in 2020.
