= Dimitrios Itoudis =

Greek professional basketball coach (born 1970)

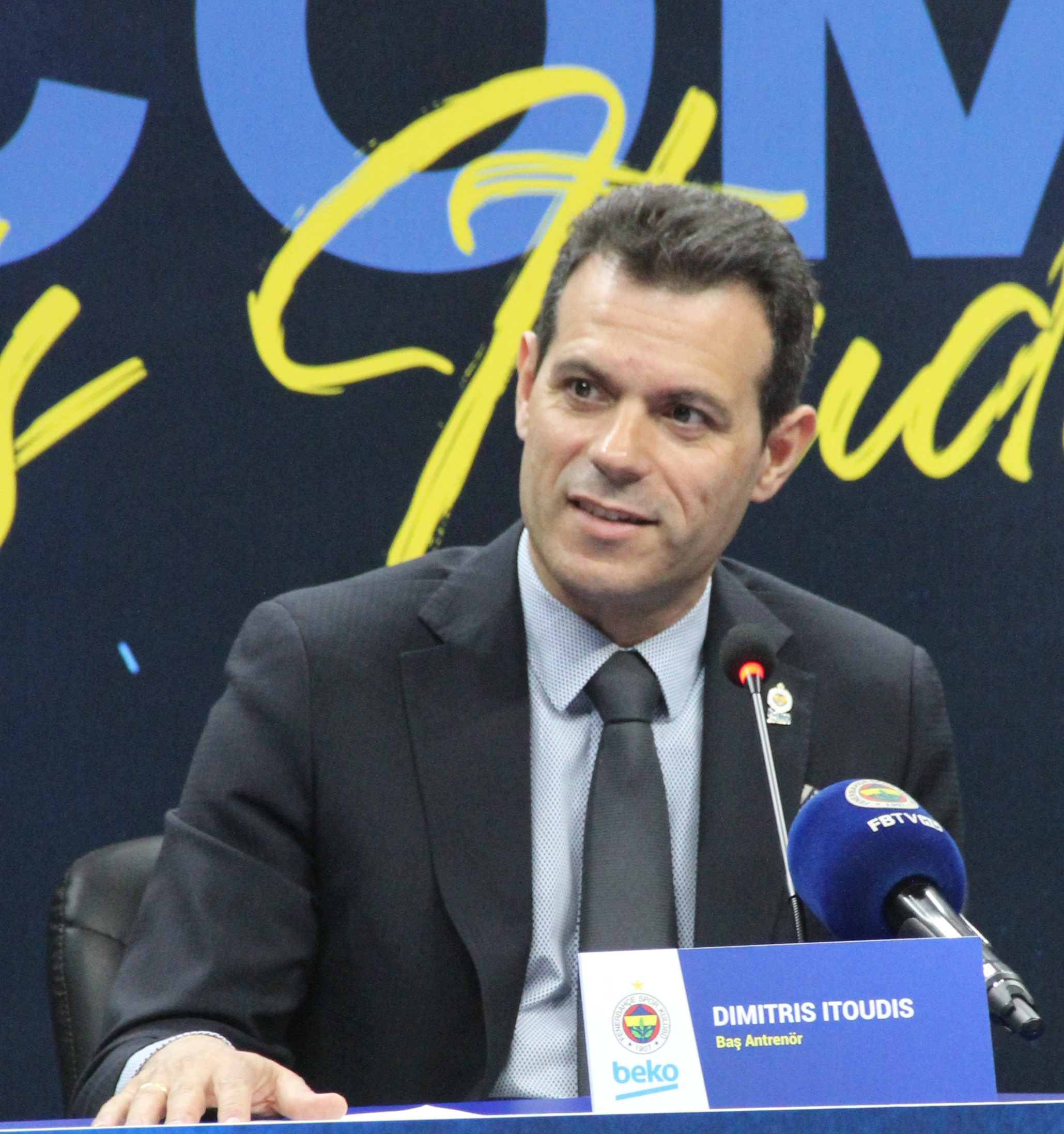
- Itoudis at the signing ceremony at Fenerbahçe in 2022

Hapoel Tel Aviv
- Position: Head coach
- League: Israeli Premier League; EuroLeague

Personal information
- Born: September 8, 1970 (age 56) Trikala, Imathia, Greece
- Coaching career: 1990–present

Career history

Coaching
- 1990–1992: Zagreb (youth)
- 1992–1995: Zagreb (assistant)
- 1995–1996: PAOK (assistant)
- 1996: PAOK
- 1996–1997: Panionios (assistant)
- 1997–1999: Philippos Thessaloniki
- 1999: MENT
- 1999–2012: Panathinaikos (assistant)
- 2013–2014: Banvit
- 2014–2022: CSKA Moscow
- 2022–2023: Greece
- 2022–2023: Fenerbahçe
- 2024–present: Hapoel Tel Aviv

Career highlights
- As head coach: 2× EuroLeague champion (2016, 2019); EuroCup champion (2025); 6× VTB United League champion (2015–2019, 2021); VTB United League Supercup winner (2021); 2× EuroLeague Coach of the Year (2016, 2019); 4× VTB United League Coach of the Year (2015, 2017, 2018, 2022); Israeli League Coach of the Year (2025); VTB United League Hall of Fame (2023); As assistant coach: 5× EuroLeague champion (2000, 2002, 2007, 2009, 2011); 11× Greek League champion (2000, 2001, 2003–2011); 7× Greek Cup winner (2003, 2005–2009, 2012)

Dimitrios Itoudis (alternate spelling: Dimitris) (Greek: Δημήτριος Ιτούδης, born September 8, 1970) is a Greek professional basketball coach who is currently the head coach for Hapoel Tel Aviv of the Israeli Premier League and the Euroleague. He formerly coached the Greece men's national basketball team.

== Coaching career ==
=== 1990–98 ===
Itoudis began his coaching career in 1990, when he began coaching Zagreb's Under-18 team in Croatia. In 1992, he became an assistant coach with the senior men's team of Zagreb. In 1995, he became an assistant coach with the Greek Basket League club PAOK.

He then became the head coach of PAOK in 1996. He was an assistant coach with the Greek club Panionios, during the 1996–97 season, before becoming the head coach of the Greek club, Philippos Thessaloniki, from 1997 to 1999. After that, he was the head coach of the Greek club MENT.

=== 1999–2012 ===
He then became the assistant coach of Željko Obradović, with the Greek club Panathinaikos. He worked as Panathinaikos' assistant, from 1999 to 2012. While he was Panathinaikos' assistant coach, he was a part of 5 EuroLeague championship teams (2000, 2002, 2007, 2009, 2011), 11 Greek League championship teams (2000, 2001, 2003–2011), and 7 Greek Cup winning teams (2003, 2005–2009, 2012)

=== 2013–2021 ===
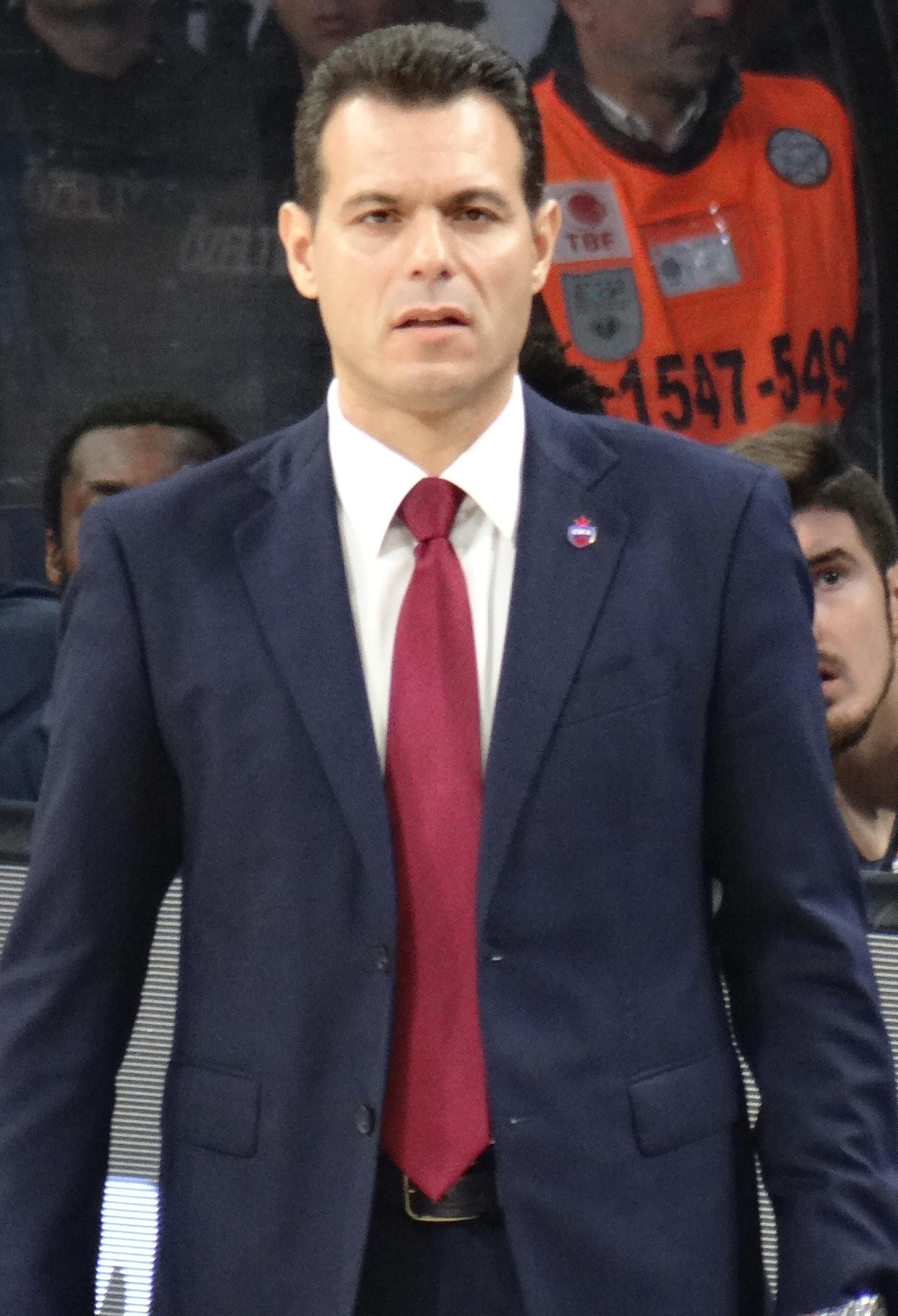
Itoudis at the game between Anadolu Efes and CSKA Moscow, in November 2017.

Itoudis became the head coach of the Turkish Super League club Banvit in 2013. In June 2014, he became the head coach of CSKA Moscow, signing a two-year deal. In his first season working with the team (2014–15), CSKA Moscow won the VTB United League, after eliminating Khimki with a 3–0 series sweep in the league's finals series.

In his second season with CSKA Moscow (2015–16), he became the first Greek basketball coach to win the EuroLeague championship with a foreign (non-Greek) club. On June 3, 2016, he re-signed with CSKA for three seasons. In July 2016, he was named the EuroLeague Coach of the Year, for the 2015–16 season. He left CSKA Moscow in June 2022, with one year remaining on his contract.

=== 2022–present ===
On 19 June 2022, he signed a 3-year-deal with Fenerbahçe. His contract was terminated in December 2023, a year ahead of the end of his contract.

At the end of November 2024, he signed with the Israeli EuroCup team Hapoel Tel Aviv, replacing his former assistant coach Stefanos Dedas. A few months later, he won the EuroCup title.

== Coaching record ==
Legend
G	Games coached	W	Games won	L	Games lost	W–L %	Win-loss %

Note: The EuroLeague is not the only competition in which the team played during the season. He also coached in domestic competition, and regional competition if applicable.

=== EuroLeague ===
Team	Year	G	W	L	W–L%	Result
CSKA Moscow	2014–15	30	26	4	.867	Won in 3rd place game
CSKA Moscow	2015–16	29	24	5	.828	Won EuroLeague Championship
CSKA Moscow	2016–17	35	26	9	.743	Won in 3rd place game
CSKA Moscow	2017–18	36	27	9	.750	Lost in 3rd place game
CSKA Moscow	2018–19	36	29	7	.806	Won EuroLeague Championship
CSKA Moscow	2019–20	28	19	9	.679	Season cancelled
CSKA Moscow	2020–21	39	27	12	.692	Lost in 3rd place game
CSKA Moscow	2021–22	24	14	10	.583	CSKA kicked out of the EuroLeague due to the Russo-Ukrainian war
Fenerbahçe	2022–23	39	21	8	.724	Eliminated in Quarterfinal Playoffs
Fenerbahçe	2023–24	13	6	7	.462	Fired
Hapoel Tel Aviv	2025–26	42	24	18	.571	Eliminated in Quarterfinal Playoffs
Career		351	243	98	.713	

=== Domestic Leagues ===
Team	Year	G	W	L	W–L%	Result
CSKA Moscow	2019–20	19	15	4	.789	Season cancelled
CSKA Moscow	2020–21	34	25	9	.735	Won 2021 VTB United League Finals
CSKA Moscow	2021–22	31	24	7	.774	Season cancelled
Career		84	64	20	.762	

== See also ==
- List of EuroLeague-winning head coaches
