= Nikos Nikolopoulos =

Nikos Nikolopoulos may refer to:

- Nikolaos Nikolopoulos (born 1958), Greek politician.
- Nikos Nikolopoulos (footballer) (born 1999), Greek footballer
