= Dimitrios S. Nikolopoulos =

Greek-British computer scientist

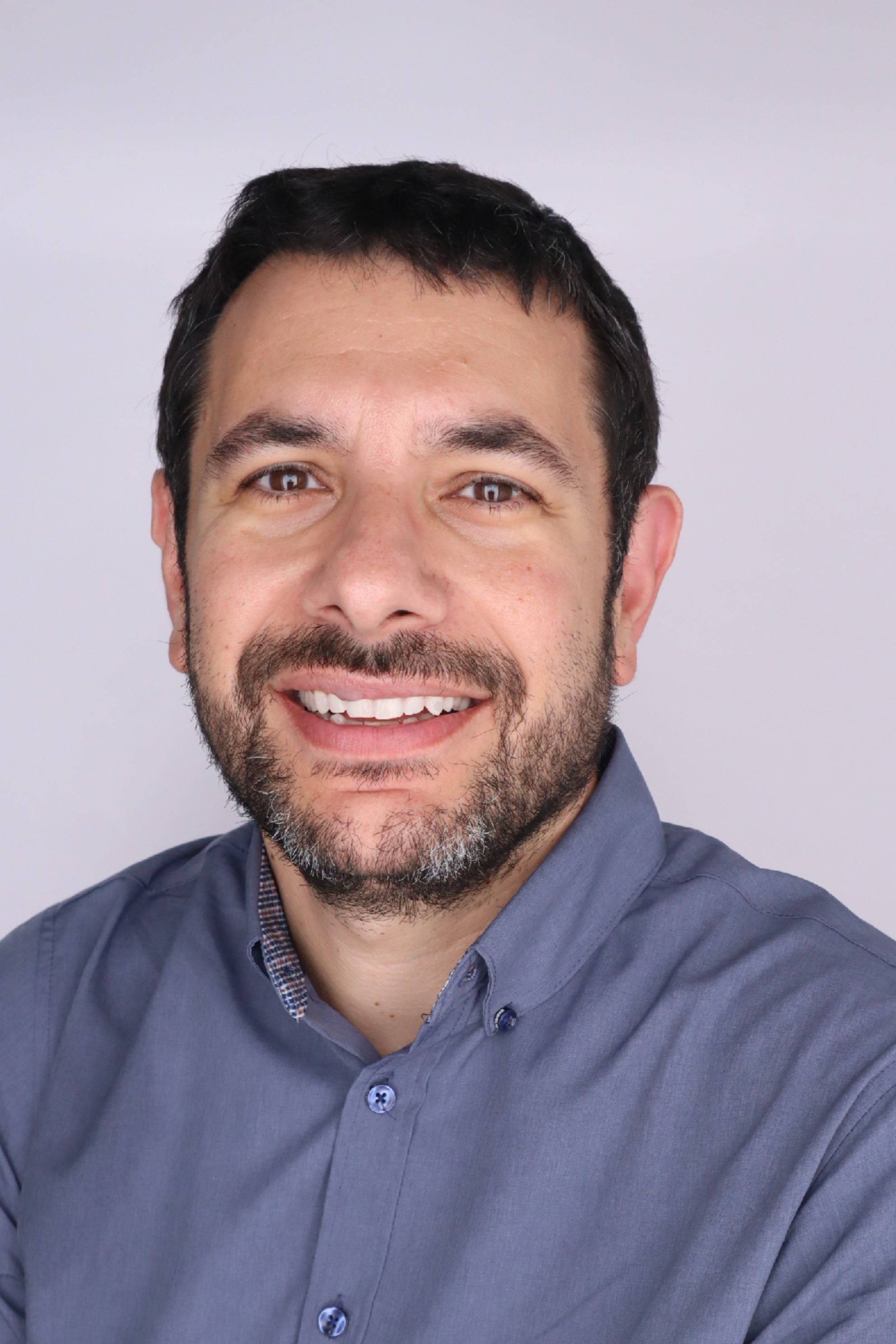
- Born: August 25, 1973 (age 52); Hamburg, Germany
- Citizenship: Greek, British
- Education: Ph.D. (2000) M.Sc. (1997) B.Eng (1996)
- Alma mater: University of Patras
- Occupations: John W. Hancock Professor of Engineering, Virginia Tech Professor – Department of Computer Science Professor – Department of Electrical and Computer Engineering, Virginia Tech
- Spouse: Christina Daniilidi
- Parents: Stelios Nikolopoulos (father); Eleni Nikolopoulos (mother)
- Website: dsniko.github.io

Dimitrios S. Nikolopoulos (born August 25, 1973) is a Greek-British computer scientist, the John W. Hancock Professor of Engineering at Virginia Tech, and an IEEE Fellow.

== Education ==
In 1996, Nikolopoulos completed his bachelor's in computer engineering and informatics at the University of Patras. In 1997 he completed his master's and in 2000 he completed his Ph.D. in computer engineering at the same university. His Ph.D. thesis research on improving data access locality on shared memory multiprocessors with non-uniform memory access latency received the Best Technical Paper Award from the ACM/IEEE Supercomputing Conference.

== Career ==
In 2001, he started his academic career as a visiting assistant professor of electrical and computer engineering at the University of Illinois at Urbana-Champaign. In 2002, he joined the College of William & Mary, as an assistant professor of computer science. In 2006, he became an associate professor of computer science at Virginia Tech. In 2009, he moved back to Greece as an associate professor of computer science at the University of Crete and a principal investigator at the Institute of Computer Science at the Foundation for Research and Technology – Hellas.

In 2012, he was appointed to the chair of high-performance and distributed computing, and as a professor and director of research at Queens University Belfast. In 2016, he was also appointed as the head of the School of Electronics, Electrical Engineering and Computer Science. In 2018, he became the director of the Institute on Electronics, Communications and Information Technology. In 2019 he moved back to Virginia Tech as the John W. Hancock Professor of Engineering and professor of computer science.

== Awards and recognition ==
Nikolopoulos is an IEEE Fellow, an elected Royal Society Wolfson Fellow, a Fellow of the Asia-Pacific Artificial Intelligence Association, a Fellow of the British Computer Society, and a Fellow of the Institute of Engineering and Technology. Additionally, he holds the titles of Distinguished Member of the Association for Computing Machinery and Distinguished Visitor of the IEEE Computer Society.

=== Awards ===
- Royal Society Wolfson Research Merit Award
- National Science Foundation CAREER Award
- Department of Energy CAREER Award
- IBM Faculty Award
- Cisco Faculty Award
- SFI-DEL Investigator Award
- Marie Curie Individual Fellowship
- Sony Faculty Innovation Award (2022)
- ACM Distinguished Member (2018)
- Best Paper Award distinctio

== Selected publications ==
- Nikolopoulos, D. S., Papatheodorou, T. S., Polychronopoulos, C. D., Labarta, J., & Ayguadé, E. (2000). A transparent runtime data distribution engine for OpenMP. Scientific Programming, 8/3: 143–62. DOI: 10.1155/2000/417570
- S. Schneider, C. D. Antonopoulos, and D. S. Nikolopoulos, “Scalable locality-conscious multithreaded memory allocation,” in International Symposium on Memory Management, ISMM, 2006. doi: 10.1145/1133956.1133968.
- D. S. Nikolopoulos, T. S. Papatheodorou, C. D. Polychronopoulos, J. Labarta, and E. Ayguadé, “Is data distribution necessary in OpenMP ?,” in Proceedings of the International Conference on Supercomputing, 2000. doi: 10.1109/SC.2000.10025.
- D. S. Nikolopoulos, “Quantifying and resolving remote memory access contention on hardware DSM multiprocessors,” in Proceedings - International Parallel and Distributed Processing Symposium, IPDPS 2002, 2002. doi: 10.1109/IPDPS.2002.1015503.
- M. Curtis-Maury, A. Shah, F. Blagojevic, D. S. Nikolopoulos, B. R. De Supinski, and M. Schulz, “Prediction models for multi-dimensional power-performance optimization on many cores,” in Parallel Architectures and Compilation Techniques - Conference Proceedings, PACT, 2008. doi: 10.1145/1454115.1454151.
- M. Curtis-Maury, J. Dzierwa, C. D. Antonopoulos, and D. S. Nikolopoulos, “Online power-performance adaptation of multithreaded programs using hardware event-based prediction,” in Proceedings of the International Conference on Supercomputing, 2006. doi: 10.1145/1183401.1183426.
- C. H. Hong, I. Spence, and D. S. Nikolopoulos, “FairGV: Fair and fast GPU virtualization,” IEEE Transactions on Parallel and Distributed Systems, vol. 28, no. 12, 2017, doi: 10.1109/TPDS.2017.2717908.
- U. I. Minhas, R. Woods, Di. S. Nikolopoulos, and G. Karakonstantis, “Efficient, Dynamic Multi-Task Execution on FPGA-Based Computing Systems,” IEEE Transactions on Parallel and Distributed Systems, vol. 33, no. 3, 2022, doi: 10.1109/TPDS.2021.3101153.
- B. Varghese, N. Wang, S. Barbhuiya, P. Kilpatrick, and D. S. Nikolopoulos, “Challenges and Opportunities in Edge Computing,” in Proceedings - 2016 IEEE International Conference on Smart Cloud, SmartCloud 2016, 2016. doi: 10.1109/SmartCloud.2016.18.
- N. Wang, B. Varghese, M. Matthaiou, and D. S. Nikolopoulos, “ENORM: A Framework for Edge NOde Resource Management,” IEEE Trans Serv Comput, vol. 13, no. 6, 2020, doi: 10.1109/TSC.2017.2753775.
