= Konstantinos Nikolopoulos (footballer, born 2002) =

Greek footballer

Personal information
- Full name: Konstantinos Nikolopoulos
- Date of birth: 13 July 2002 (age 24)
- Place of birth: Athens, Greece
- Height: 1.70 m (5 ft 7 in)
- Position: Winger

Team information
- Current team: Asteras Stavrou

Youth career
- Lamia

Senior career*
Years	Team	Apps	(Gls)
2020–2022	Lamia	3	(0)
2022	→ A.O. Ypato (loan)		
2022–	Asteras Stavrou		
- * Club domestic league appearances and goals

Konstantinos Nikolopoulos (Greek: Κωνσταντίνος Νικολόπουλος; born 13 July 2002) is a Greek professional footballer who plays as a forward for Asteras Stavrou.

== Club career ==
=== Lamia ===
Nikolopoulos joined Lamia youth team in 2019 and was transferred to Lamia current squad in 2020.
