= Milan Jeremić (basketball) =

Serbian-Greek basketball player

Milan Jeremic
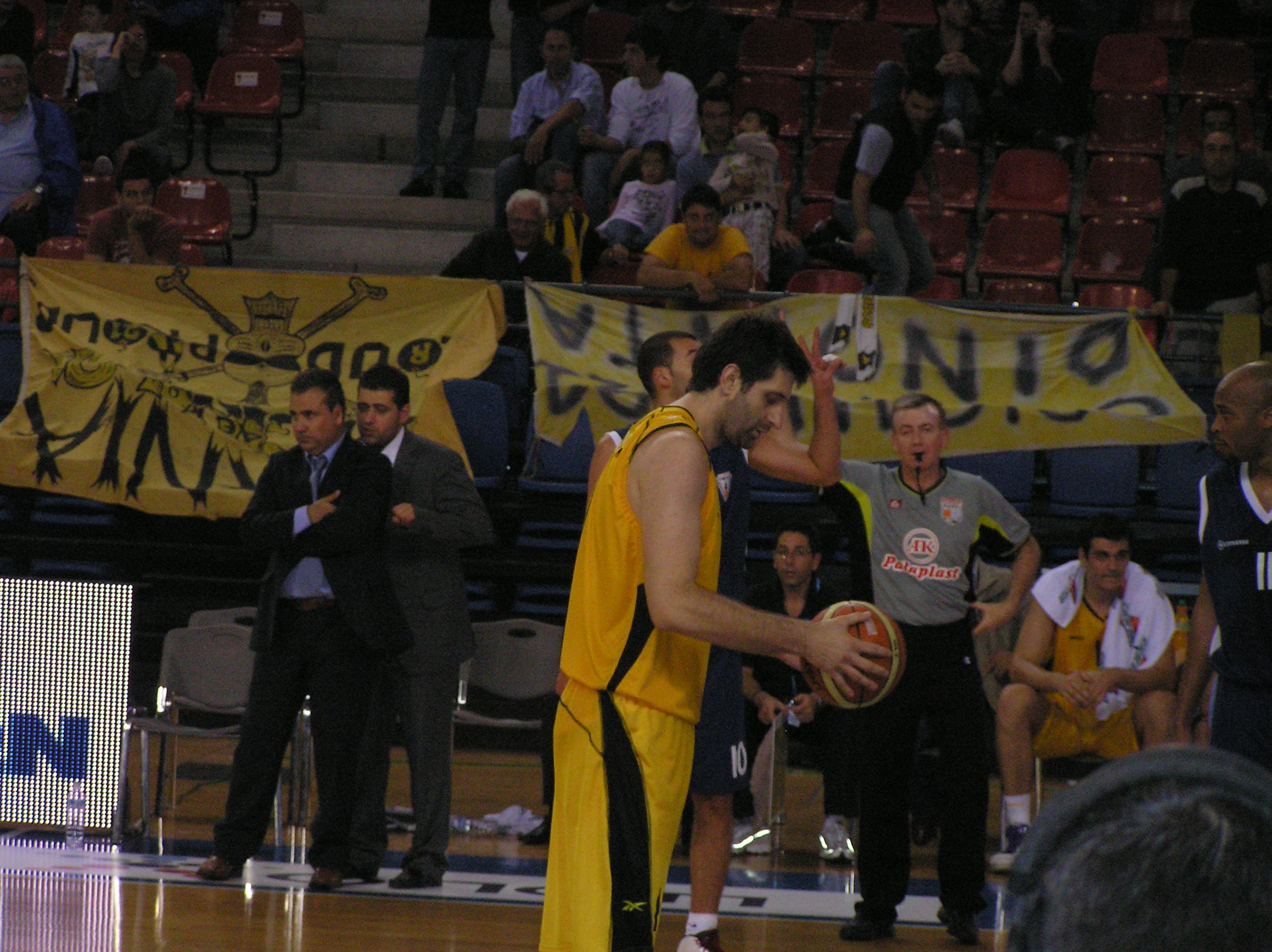

Personal information
- Born: 30 August 1977 (age 49) Zlatibor, SR Serbia, SFR Yugoslavia
- Listed height: 6 ft 10.25 in (2.09 m)

Career information
- NBA draft: 1999: undrafted
- Playing career: 1995–2015
- Position: Center
- Number: 19

Career history
- 1995–1998: Iraklis
- 1998–1999: Maes Aalst
- 1999–2000: Olimpia Milano
- 2000–2001: Unia Tarnów
- 2001–2002: AGE Halkida
- 2002–2003: Vojvodina
- 2003–2005: AGE Halkida
- 2005–2006: MENT
- 2006–2007: Ionikos Lamias
- 2007–2008: Trikala 2000
- 2008–2009: AGE Halkida
- 2009-2010: AEK
- ?: AGE Halkida
- 2013–2015: Kymis

Milan Jeremić (Serbian Cyrillic: Милан Јеремић); born 30 August 1977) is a Serbian-Greek former professional basketball player. He is 2.09 m (6 ft 10 1/4 in) in height, and he played at the center position.

== Professional career ==
After playing for Partizan Belgrade's academy, Greek club Iraklis acquired his rights for 32 million drachmas. Following his transfer he was given Greek citizenship, under the name of Milan Sagias, and played for Iraklis, from 1995 to 1998. He moved to Belgium, to play with Maes Aalst Okapi. He also played in the Italian league with Olimpia Milano (1999–00), and in Poland, with Unia Tarnów (2000–01).

He moved back to Greece, and played with AGE Halkida, and then returned to Serbia, where he played with Vojvodina, in 2002–03. He returned to Greece again, where he then played with AGE Halkida, MENT, Ionikos Lamias, and Trikala 2000.
