= Danas Run =

Stream in Ohio, U.S.

Coordinates: 39°23′24″N 81°14′19″W

Danas Run is a stream in the U.S. state of Ohio. It is a tributary to the Ohio River.

Variant names are "Dana Run" and "Dana's Run". Danas Run has the name of William Dana, who operated a watermill on its banks in 1816.
