= Christos Marinos =

Greek basketball player

Christos Marinos (Greek: Χρήστος Μαρίνος; born 1989) is a Greek professional basketball player. At a height of 1.86 m (6 ft 1 1/4 in) tall, he plays at the point guard position.
