= Giorgos Danas =

Greek professional basketball player

Giorgos Danas Γιώργος Δανάς
Free agent
- Position: Point guard

Personal information
- Born: June 22, 1991 (age 35) Rhodes, Greece
- Listed height: 6 ft 0 in (1.83 m)
- Listed weight: 173 lb (78 kg)

Career information
- NBA draft: 2013: undrafted
- Playing career: 2008–present

Career history
- 2008–2014: Kolossos Rodou
- 2014–2015: Lavrio
- 2015–2016: Promitheas Patras
- 2016–2017: Filathlitikos
- 2017–2018: Niki Amarousiou

Giorgos Danas (Greek: Γιώργος Δανάς; born June 22, 1991, in Rhodes, Greece) is a Greek professional basketball player. He is a 6-foot-0-inch (1.83 m) tall point guard.

== Professional career ==
Danas started his professional career with Kolossos Rhodes in 2008. In 2014, he signed with Lavrio. In October 2015, he moved to Promitheas Patras in the Greek 2nd Division.
