= Marios Nicolaou (footballer, born 1981) =

Cypriot footballer (born 1981)

Personal information
- Full name: Marios Nicolaou
- Date of birth: March 22, 1981 (age 45)
- Place of birth: Cyprus
- Position: Defender

Senior career*
| Years | Team | Apps | (Gls) |
| 2001–2005 | AC Omonia | 74 | (1) |
| 2005–2006 | Nea Salamis Famagusta FC | 11 | (0) |
| 2007 | Olympiakos Nicosia | | |
| 2008–2009 | MEAP Nisou | | |

International career
| | Cyprus | 8 | (0) |
- * Club domestic league appearances and goals as of 1 September 2007

Marios Nicolaou (Greek: Μάριος Νικολάου; born March 22, 1981) is a Cypriot defender. His former teams are Olympiakos Nicosia, Nea Salamis Famagusta FC and AC Omonia where he started his career.
