= M.E.N.T. B.C. =

M.E.N.T.
- Leagues: Greek C League
- Founded: 1926
- History: 1926 – Present
- Arena: Toumba Indoor Hall (capacity: 1,000)
- Location: Thessaloniki, Greece
- Team colors: White and Blue
- Head coach: Panos Nomikos
- Website: mentbc.gr
Home	Away

M.E.N.T. B.C., officially known as the Educational Union of Toumba Youth (Greek: Μορφωτική Ένωσις Νεολαίας Τούμπας, Morfotiki Enossis Neoleas Toumbas) or M.E.N.T. B.C., is a Greek professional basketball club that was founded in 1926. The team is located in Thessaloniki, Greece. M.E.N.T. B.C. currently competes in the third-tier level division of Greece, the Greek C League.

== History ==
Originally, the club's parent athletic association included the sports of basketball, football, cycling, and also a literary and entertainment section. Today, there are departments only for the basketball club and the volleyball club. In 2004, M.E.N.T. B.C. finished in 2nd place in the Greek 2nd Division, and thus earned a league promotion, and then competed in the top-tier level Greek Basket League, in the following 2004–05 season.

== Roster ==
MENT B.C. roster
Players
Coaches

Pos.	No.	Nat.	Name	Ht.	Wt.	Age
PG	4	(Greece)	Abatzas, Vaios			28 – 2 July 1996
PG	5	(Greece)	Kalpaxidis, Ilias			40 – 7 July 1984
SG	6	(Greece)	Papadopoulos, Petros			32 – 3 May 1992
SF	7	(Greece)	Michailidis, Grigoris (C)			49 – 14 February 1976
PF	8	(Greece)	Bourazanis, Konstantinos			28 – 18 October 1996
PF	9	(Greece)	Karanotas, Stanislav			36 – 18 May 1988
SG	10	(Greece)	Papadopoulos, Aggelos			28 – 5 July 1996
PF	11	(Greece)	Kappos, Ioannis			37 – 27 August 1987
SF	12	(Greece)	Tzioufas, Athanasios			29 – 22 March 1996
PG	13	(Greece)	Akseheroglou, Dimitrios			38 – 2 March 1987
PF	14	(Greece)	Bagdasaryan, Andrey			43 – 1 June 1981
C	15	(Greece)	Giannoulis, Giannis			48 – 5 June 1976
SF	17	(Greece)	Velentzas, Dimitrios			26 – 5 January 1999
SG	-	(Greece)	Kourkoulas, Stylianos			25 – 20 July 1999
PF	-	(Greece)	Lahanis, Konstantinos			25 – 14 December 1999
PG	-	(Greece)	Koniakis, Georgios			26 – 12 February 1999
PF	-	(Greece)	Kranias, Evangelos			25 – 2 November 1999

Head coach

- (Greece) Panagiotis Nomikos

Assistant coach(es)

- (Greece) Chronis Daskalakis
- (Greece) Vasilis Valasiadis

Legend

- (C) Team captain
- Injured

- Roster
Updated: March 3, 2018

== Notable players ==
Note: Flags indicate national team eligibility at FIBA-sanctioned events. Players may hold other non-FIBA nationalities not displayed.

Criteria

To appear in this section a player must have either:

- Set a club record or won an individual award while at the club
- Played at least one official international match for their national team at any time
- Played at least one official NBA match at any time.

- (Greece) Costas Christou
- (Greece) Georgios Dedas
- (Greece) Michalis Giannakidis
- (Greece) Giannis Giannoulis
- (Greece) Vangelis Karampoulas
- (Greece) Sakis Karidas
- (Greece) Vassilis Lipiridis
- (Greece) Milan Sagias
- (Greece) Dimitris Spanoulis
- (Slovenia) Miljan Goljović
- (Croatia) Goran Kalamiza
- (United States) Dylan Page
- (United States) Marcus Taylor
- (United States) Clay Tucker

== Head coaches ==
- (Greece) Dimitrios Itoudis
- (Greece) Stefanos Dedas
- (Greece) Sotos Nikolaidis
