= Xanthi B.C. =

- Nickname: Queen of Thrace
- Arena: Xanthi Arena
- Capacity: 5,000
- Location: Western Thrace, Xanthi, Greece
- Team colors: Red and Blue
Home	Away

Xanthi B.C. (Greek: Αθλητικός Σύλλογος Ξάνθη) was a Greek professional basketball club that is located in Western Thrace, Xanthi, Greece. Xanthi competed in the Greek 2nd Division.

== History ==
Xanthi competed in the 2nd-tier level Greek 2nd Division, and then merged with Koroivos in 2010. Koroivos then took over Xanthi's place in the Greek 2nd Division in the following season.

After Koroivos took Xanthi's place in the Greek 2nd Division, Xanthi was then relegated down to the 5th-tier level league in Greece, due to the club's financial problems.

The club then merged with A.P.S. Aspida Xanthi for the 2010–11 season.

== Arena ==
The club's home arena is Xanthi Arena. Its capacity is 5,000.

== Notable players ==
- (Greece) Sakis Karidas
- (Greece) Charis Markopoulos
- (Greece) Dimitris Spanoulis
