= 2025 EuroLeague Final Four =

Basketball tournament in Abu Dhabi

- Season: 2024–25 EuroLeague

Tournament details
- Arena: Etihad Arena; Abu Dhabi, United Arab Emirates
- Dates: 23–25 May 2025

Final positions
- Champions: (Turkey) Fenerbahçe Beko (2nd title)
- Runners-up: (France) Monaco
- Third place: (Greece) Olympiacos
- Fourth place: (Greece) Panathinaikos AKTOR

Awards and statistics
- MVP: (United States) Nigel Hayes-Davis
- Top scorer(s): (United States) Alpha Diallo (41 points)

The 2025 EuroLeague Final Four was the concluding EuroLeague Final Four tournament of the 2024–25 EuroLeague season, the 68th season of Europe's premier club basketball tournament, and the 25th season since it was first organised by Euroleague Basketball. It was the 38th Final Four of the modern EuroLeague Final Four era (1988–present), and the 40th time overall that the competition has concluded with a final four format. Euroleague Basketball announced that the Final Four would be played at the Etihad Arena in Abu Dhabi, United Arab Emirates, on 23–25 May 2025, marking the first time that the EuroLeague's Final Four was held outside of Europe since 2004. This was the last Final Four to include third place play-off match, since it's getting excluded starting from 2026.

Fenerbahçe Beko won their 2nd title after beating Monaco in the championship game. In the semi-final round, Fenerbahçe defeated Panathinaikos AKTOR and Monaco defeated Olympiacos. Fenerbahçe's Nigel Hayes-Davis was awarded the EuroLeague Final Four MVP.

== Background ==
On 28 January 2025, the EuroLeague, the Abu Dhabi Department of Culture and Tourism, and Etihad Arena reached an agreement that the Final Four would be played at Etihad Arena in Abu Dhabi, United Arab Emirates, on 23–25 May 2025, marking the first time the event would take place outside of Europe in the competition's history in 21 years. The venue has a basketball capacity of 12,000. Three-time EuroLeague Final Four MVP and former NBA player Toni Kukoč was involved in marketing the tournament in Abu Dhabi. Thousands of Turkish and Greek basketball fans traveled to Abu Dhabi out of personal expense to cheer on their favorite teams.

Critics argued that the move prioritized financial gains over fan engagement. Abu Dhabi reportedly paid €50 million to host the event, a sum that helped trigger a contract extension between EuroLeague and IMG until 2036. Former EuroLeague CEO Jordi Bertomeu acknowledged the decision as "risky" emphasizing the importance of fan experience. Journalist Faustino Sáez of Cadena SER described the move as emblematic of sports becoming "purely a business that overlooks emotions", undermining the competition's foundations.

Fans also faced logistical challenges due to the distance and cost of traveling to Abu Dhabi. The city's limited public transport and higher expenses compared to European hosts like Belgrade or Barcelona were highlighted as deterrents. Technical issues during ticket sales further frustrated supporters, with many unable to purchase tickets due to platform errors. To boost attendance, organizers resorted to incentives like daily car raffles and free tickets. The venue choice also raised questions about the EuroLeague's European identity. With no EuroLeague teams based in the Middle East, critics viewed the move as brand dilution. Only Real Madrid and Olympiacos openly opposed the decision, expressing concerns about the maturity of the Arabian market and the potential alienation of core European fans. Others, including Žalgiris coach Andrea Trinchieri, saw potential benefits in expanding basketball's reach, the consensus among critics was that the move compromised the competition's integrity and accessibility in favor of commercial interests.

== Teams ==
Team	Qualified date	Participations (bold indicates winners)
(Hellenic Basketball Federation) Olympiacos	1 May 2025	13 (1994, 1995, **1997**, 1999, 2009, 2010, **2012**, **2013**, 2015, 2017, 2022, 2023, 2024)
(French Federation of Basketball) Monaco	6 May 2025	1 (2023)
(Turkish Basketball Federation) Fenerbahçe Beko	29 April 2025	6 (2015, 2016, **2017**, 2018, 2019, 2024)
(Hellenic Basketball Federation) Panathinaikos AKTOR	6 May 2025	12 (1994, 1995, **1996**, **2000**, 2001, **2002**, 2005, **2007**, **2009**, **2011**, 2012, **2024**)

== Bracket ==
Semifinals
23 May
(Hellenic Basketball Federation) Olympiacos	68
**(French Federation of Basketball) Monaco**	**78**
23 May
**(Turkish Basketball Federation) Fenerbahçe Beko**	**82**
(Hellenic Basketball Federation) Panathinaikos AKTOR	76

Championship game
25 May
(French Federation of Basketball) Monaco	70
**(Turkish Basketball Federation) Fenerbahçe Beko**	**81**
Third place game
25 May
**(Hellenic Basketball Federation) Olympiacos**	**97**
(Hellenic Basketball Federation) Panathinaikos AKTOR	93

== Semifinals ==
=== Semifinal A ===
23 May 2025	Olympiacos (Hellenic Basketball Federation)	68–**78**	(French Federation of Basketball) **Monaco**	Abu Dhabi, United Arab Emirates
20:00 (CEST)	Scoring by quarter: 17–17, 15–**18**, 19–**22**, 17–**21**
	Pts: Fournier 31; Rebs: Vezenkov 8 Asts: three players 2 PIR: Fournier 27	Boxscore	Pts: Diallo 22; Rebs: James 7 Asts: James 7 PIR: James 29	Arena: Etihad Arena; Attendance: 10,218; Referees: Ilija Belošević, Emilio Pérez, Milan Nedović

Starters:			Pts	Reb	Ast
PG	1	(United States) Nigel Williams-Goss	12	4	2
SG	94	(France) Evan Fournier	31	3	2
SF	16	(Greece) Kostas Papanikolaou	2	3	0
PF	14	(Bulgaria) Sasha Vezenkov	7	8	1
C	10	(France) Moustapha Fall	2	3	1
Reserves:					
PG	0	(Greece) Thomas Walkup	2	3	2
C	2	(United States) Moses Wright	DNP		
G	8	(Argentina) Luca Vildoza	0	0	0
G	9	(United States) Saben Lee	1	1	1
PF	25	(Bosnia and Herzegovina) Alec Peters	3	1	1
C	33	(Serbia) Nikola Milutinov	8	2	0
G/F	77	(Azerbaijan) Shaquielle McKissic	0	1	0
Head coach:
(Hellenic Basketball Federation) Georgios Bartzokas

**Olympiacos**	**Monaco**

Olympiacos	Statistics	Monaco
18/32 (56.3%)	2-pt field goals	25/47 (53.2%)
5/27 (18.5%)	3-pt field goals	5/17 (29.4%)
17/23 (73.9%)	Free throws	13/15 (86.7%)
9	Offensive rebounds	12
24	Defensive rebounds	29
33	Total rebounds	41
10	Assists	21
14	Turnovers	14
7	Steals	10
6	Blocks	2
23	Fouls	19

Starters:			Pts	Reb	Ast
PG	55	(United States) Mike James	17	7	7
SG	32	(France) Matthew Strazel	2	3	3
SF	11	(United States) Alpha Diallo	22	6	3
PF	4	(United States) Jaron Blossomgame	12	5	0
C	10	(Germany) Daniel Theis	5	4	0
Reserves:					
G	0	(France) Élie Okobo	7	3	3
SG	8	(United States) Jordan Loyd	0	2	1
C	9	(Greece) Georgios Papagiannis	DNP		
C	14	(France) Mam Jaiteh	11	6	1
SF	22	(France) Terry Tarpey	DNP		
F	30	(United States) Vitto Brown	DNP		
PG	33	(Greece) Nick Calathes	2	1	3
Head coach:
(Hellenic Basketball Federation) Vassilis Spanoulis

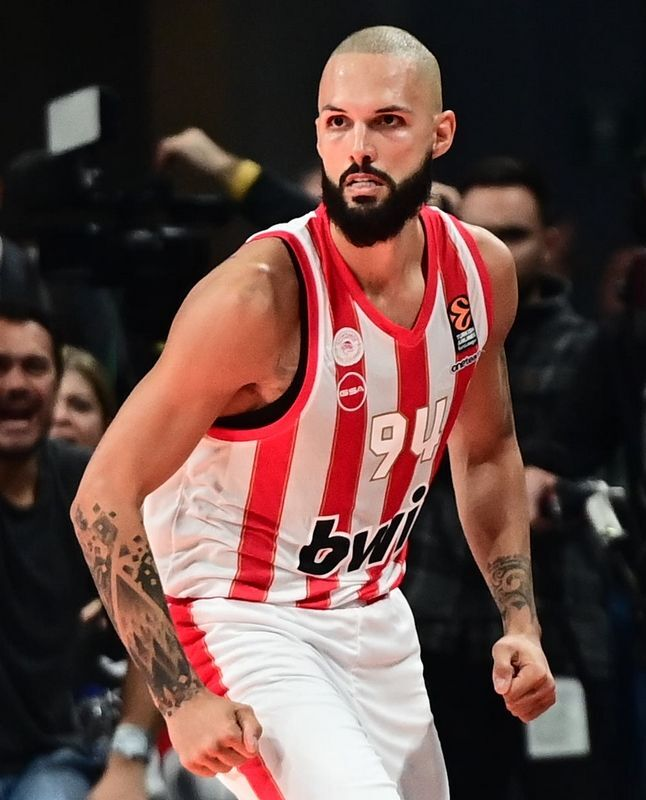
Evan Fournier scored a EuroLeague career-high 31 points in the loss.

Olympiacos' Evan Fournier scored a EuroLeague career-high 31 points, but his team still lost to Monaco 78–68. Nigel Williams-Goss was the only other Olympiacos player to reach double figures in scoring, with 12 points. Sasha Vezenkov had a difficult game offensively, with only 7 points and 8 rebounds; he also missed all six of his three-point field goal attempts. Aside from Fournier, Olympiacos was 1 of 19 on three-pointers. Monaco was ahead for most of the game, led by the scoring of Mike James and Alpha Diallo, with 22 and 17 points respectively. The game began with Olympiaco's defense locking down Monaco in the first three minutes; both teams' defenses maintained an advantage over the offenses throughout the first quarter, with the score tied at 17 apiece when it concluded. Monaco scored the first four points of the second quarter, but Olympiacos' head coach Georgios Bartzokas' small ball lineup of three guards responded with their own 6–0 run to take the lead. Nikola Milutinov of Olympiacos contributed with some help on offense and rebounding, but this was not enough compared to his team's shooting woes combined with Monaco's fast break, as Monaco went ahead by five (31–26).

Olympiacos entered halftime just 2 of 12 on three pointers, with seven assists and eight turnovers, all far worse than their typical performance. Monaco increased their lead throughout the second half by taking advantage of Olympiacos' low shooting percentage and questionable decisions. Several key baskets to open the third quarter from Monaco's Daniel Theis, Diallo, and Jaron Blossomgame pushed their lead to twelve, but Olympiacos' Fournier answered with his own scoring surge to cut Monaco's lead down to four (55–51). Fournier alone had trouble keeping up, as he received little scoring help from teammates in the fourth quarter, while Monaco expanded their lead into double digits highlighted by Mike James dishing out crowd-pleasing assists. With two minutes remaining and his team down by seven, Fournier committed a crucial turnover, which Monaco converted into a basket to increase their lead to nine (74–65) with 79 seconds left. As a result of the victory, Monaco became the first French team in 32 years to play in the final of the European highest level league, and only the second team to reach the stage, following Limoges CSP in the 1992–93 FIBA European League.

=== Semifinal B ===
23 May 2025	**Fenerbahçe Beko** (Turkish Basketball Federation)	**82**–76	(Hellenic Basketball Federation) Panathinaikos AKTOR	Abu Dhabi, United Arab Emirates
17:00 (CEST)	Scoring by quarter: **22**–14, 16–**19**, **17**–15, 27–**28**
	Pts: Hall 18; Rebs: Melli 6 Asts: Hayes-Davis, Baldwin 5 PIR: Hall 18	Boxscore	Pts: Osman 22; Rebs: Osman 6 Asts: Grant 4 PIR: Grant 17	Arena: Etihad Arena; Attendance: 10,218; Referees: Carlos Peruga, Robert Lottermoser, Mehdi Difallah

Starters:			Pts	Reb	Ast
PG	23	(Serbia) Marko Gudurić	3	2	1
SG	20	(United States) Devon Hall	18	1	2
SF	50	(United States) Bonzie Colson	3	1	1
PF	11	(United States) Nigel Hayes-Davis	7	3	5
C	92	(Canada) Khem Birch	2	4	0
Reserves:					
G	0	(United States) Errick McCollum	13	3	2
G	2	(United States) Wade Baldwin	10	5	5
F/C	4	(Italy) Nicolò Melli	9	6	1
C	5	(Turkey) Sertaç Şanlı	0	0	0
SF	13	(Turkey) Tarik Biberović	15	3	0
F	21	(Canada) Dyshawn Pierre	2	1	0
C	44	(Angola) Jilson Bango	DNP		
Head coach:
(Lithuanian Basketball Federation) Šarūnas Jasikevičius

**Fenerbahçe**	**Panathinaikos**

Fenerbahçe	Statistics	Panathinaikos
14/28 (50%)	2-pt field goals	19/36 (52.8%)
13/34 (41.2%)	3-pt field goals	7/17 (41.2%)
12/15 (80%)	Free throws	17/22 (77.3%)
10	Offensive rebounds	6
23	Defensive rebounds	23
33	Total rebounds	29
17	Assists	10
9	Turnovers	12
7	Steals	3
4	Blocks	1
19	Fouls	22

Starters:			Pts	Reb	Ast
PG	22	(United States) Jerian Grant	15	5	4
SG	25	(United States) Kendrick Nunn	19	3	0
SF	16	(Turkey) Cedi Osman	22	6	0
PF	41	(Spain) Juancho Hernangómez	5	5	0
C	32	(South Sudan) Wenyen Gabriel	4	3	2
Reserves:					
G/F	0	(Greece) Panagiotis Kalaitzakis	0	1	0
PG	2	(Spain) Lorenzo Brown	0	1	0
G	10	(Greece) Kostas Sloukas	2	0	3
F	21	(Greece) Ioannis Papapetrou	0	0	0
C	26	(France) Mathias Lessort	7	1	1
F/C	44	(Greece) Dinos Mitoglou	0	2	0
C	77	(Turkey) Ömer Yurtseven	2	2	0
Head coach:
(Turkish Basketball Federation) Ergin Ataman

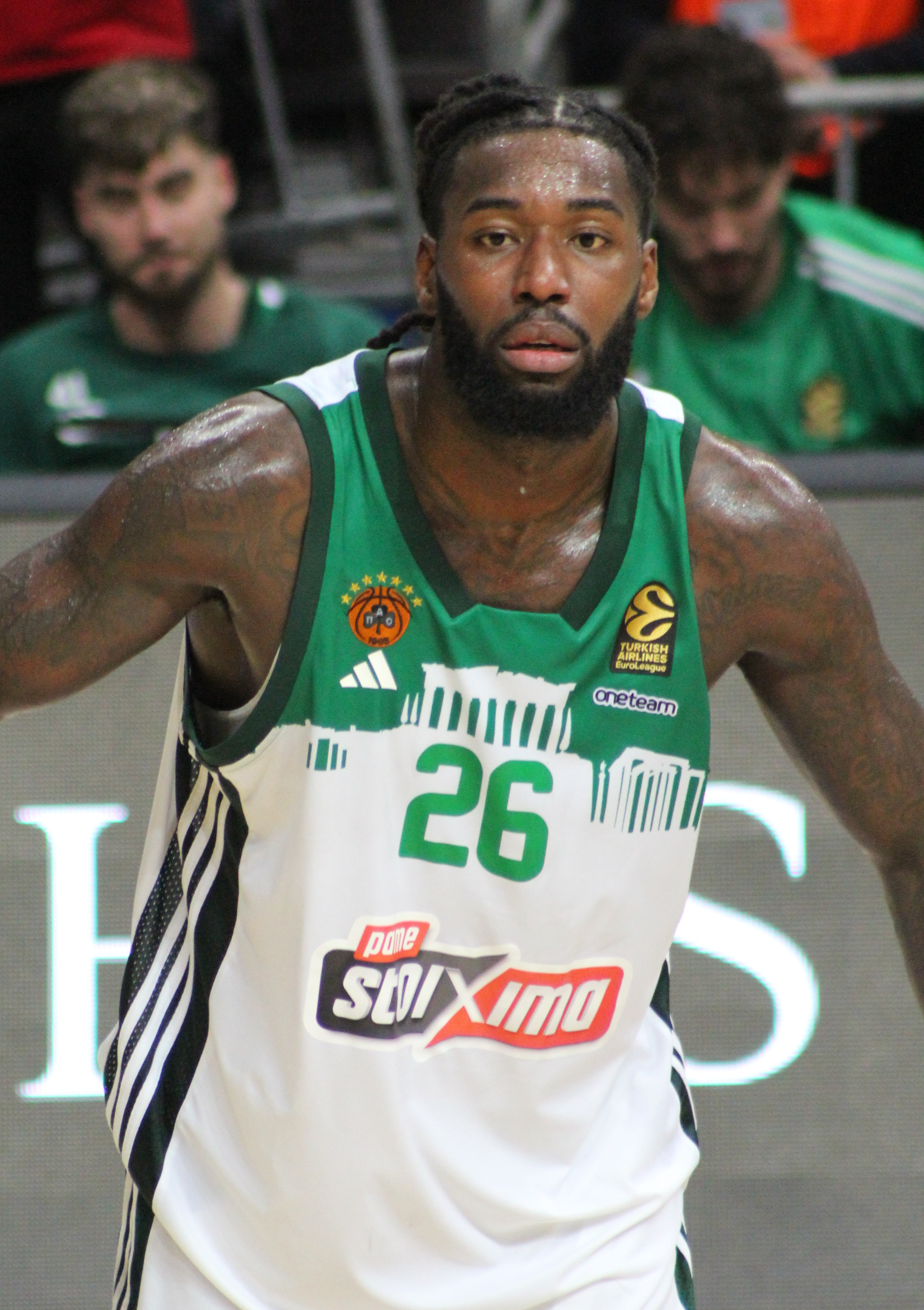
Mathias Lessort played in his first game after sitting out 150 days due to a broken leg.

Fenerbahçe won 82–76 over Panathinaikos, who lacked consistency on both offense and defense, and struggled with little to no scoring from several key players: Juancho Hernangómez (5 points), Ömer Yurtseven (2), Kostas Sloukas (2), and Dinos Mitoglou (0). For offensive help, they relied on Cedi Osman and Jerian Grant, who scored 22 and 15 points respectively, though these two players alone had difficulty establishing momentum for the team. Fenerbahçe won the game with proficient three point shooting and timely scoring runs, as well as successfully executing plays during clutch moments. Panathinaikos' guards being outmatched by Fenerbahçe's was another deciding factor in the game's outcome.

Panathinaikos had five first-quarter turnovers, which gave Fenerbahçe the chance to grab an early lead. Panathinaikos continued to be behind for the majority of the first half, but were able to trim the lead down to five by halftime. A turning point came when Kendrick Nunn of Panathinaikos, the game's top scorer at the time with 19 points, fouled out with 5:45 remaining; his consistent scoring output had kept the game close. Without their main scoring threat, Panathinaikos was subsequently unable to overcome Fenerbahçe's high-percentage three-point shooting, which had persisted all game long. Clutch perimeter shots from Devon Hall and Errick McCollum following Nunn's disqualification maintained the lead for Fenerbahçe until game's end. The game marked the return of Mathias Lessort, the Panathinaikos center who had sat out the preceding 150 days due to a broken left leg; he had 14 minutes of action and scored seven points.

== Third place game ==
25 May 2025	**Olympiacos** (Hellenic Basketball Federation)	**97**–93	(Hellenic Basketball Federation) Panathinaikos AKTOR	Abu Dhabi, United Arab Emirates
16:00 (CEST)	Scoring by quarter: **33**–20, 24–**26**, 18–18, 22–**29**
	Pts: Peters 32; Rebs: Peters 7 Asts: Vildoza 9 PIR: Peters 31	Boxscore	Pts: Yurtseven 23; Rebs: Yurtseven 8 Asts: Brown 12; PIR: Yurtseven 25	Arena: Etihad Arena; Referees: Carmelo Paternicò, Ilija Belošević, Artūras Šukys

Starters:			Pts	Reb	Ast
PG	0	(Greece) Thomas Walkup	0	1	8
SG	94	(France) Evan Fournier	5	1	4
SF	25	(Bosnia and Herzegovina) Alec Peters	32	7	1
PF	14	(Bulgaria) Sasha Vezenkov	23	2	1
C	10	(France) Moustapha Fall	5	0	3
Reserves:					
C	2	(United States) Moses Wright	19	4	1
PG	3	(Greece) Naz Mitrou-Long	DNP		
SG	5	(Greece) Giannoulis Larentzakis	5	4	1
G	8	(Argentina) Luca Vildoza	0	3	9
G	9	(United States) Saben Lee	8	5	6
C	33	(Serbia) Nikola Milutinov	DNP		
G/F	77	(Azerbaijan) Shaquielle McKissic	DNP		
Head coach:
(Hellenic Basketball Federation) Georgios Bartzokas

**Olympiacos**	**Panathinaikos**

Olympiacos	Statistics	Panathinaikos
22/38 (57.9%)	2-pt field goals	30/44 (68.2%)
13/27 (48.1%)	3-pt field goals	6/23 (26.1%)
14/16 (87.5%)	Free throws	15/18 (83.3%)
6	Offensive rebounds	9
23	Defensive rebounds	25
29	Total rebounds	34
34	Assists	25
14	Turnovers	13
7	Steals	7
0	Blocks	1
17	Fouls	21

Starters:			Pts	Reb	Ast
PG	2	(Spain) Lorenzo Brown	2	5	12
SG	25	(United States) Kendrick Nunn	9	3	1
SF	0	(Greece) Panagiotis Kalaitzakis	7	1	1
PF	44	(Greece) Dinos Mitoglou	8	3	1
C	77	(Turkey) Ömer Yurtseven	23	8	0
Reserves:					
G	10	(Greece) Kostas Sloukas	DNP		
SF	16	(Turkey) Cedi Osman	14	2	3
PF	20	(Greece) Alexandros Samodurov	8	4	1
G	22	(United States) Jerian Grant	8	3	3
C	24	(Germany) Tibor Pleiß	2	1	0
C	26	(France) Mathias Lessort	12	4	3
F/C	32	(South Sudan) Wenyen Gabriel	DNP		
Head coach:
(Turkish Basketball Federation) Ergin Ataman

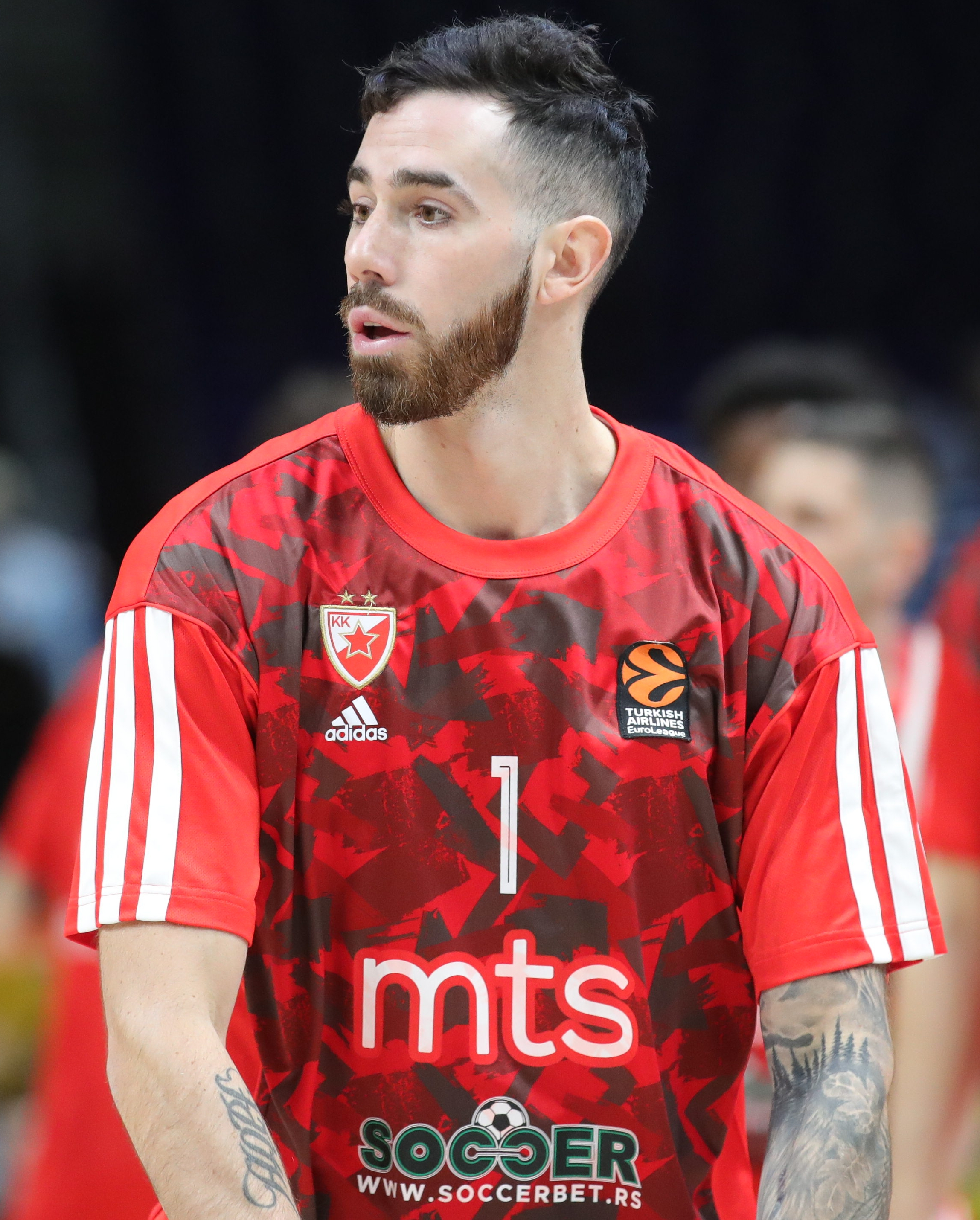
Olympiacos broke the Final Four single-game team record for most assists with 34, led by Luca Vildoza who had nine.

The third place game was contested between two Greek rivals, with Olympiacos defeating Panathinaikos 97–93. Fans of the two clubs clashed before the game, though these incidents were quelled by security forces prior to the opening tip-off. In spite of this, the gameplay on the court was considered to have a "friendly exhibition feel", with soft defense, minimal ball pressure, and few fouls. Olympiacos took the early lead by making several open shots from long range, and enjoyed leads of up to 15 points on two different occasions. Panathinaikos had to rely on their bench (led by Alexandros Samodurov) to score enough to keep the game close.

Panathinaikos was able to reduce the lead in the final two minutes, but consistent free throw shooting from Giannoulis Larentzakis and Alec Peters helped clinch the victory for Olympiacos. Olympiacos was ahead the entire game; Peters led all scorers with 32 points, tying a tournament record. Olympiacos displayed proficient ball movement and offensive efficiency with 25 assists in the first 25 minutes. By game's end, they set the Final Four single-game team record for most assists with 34, led by Luca Vildoza with nine and Thomas Walkup with eight; this broke the previous high of 31 assists accomplished by Maccabi Tel Aviv in the 2004 championship game.

== Final ==
=== Summary ===
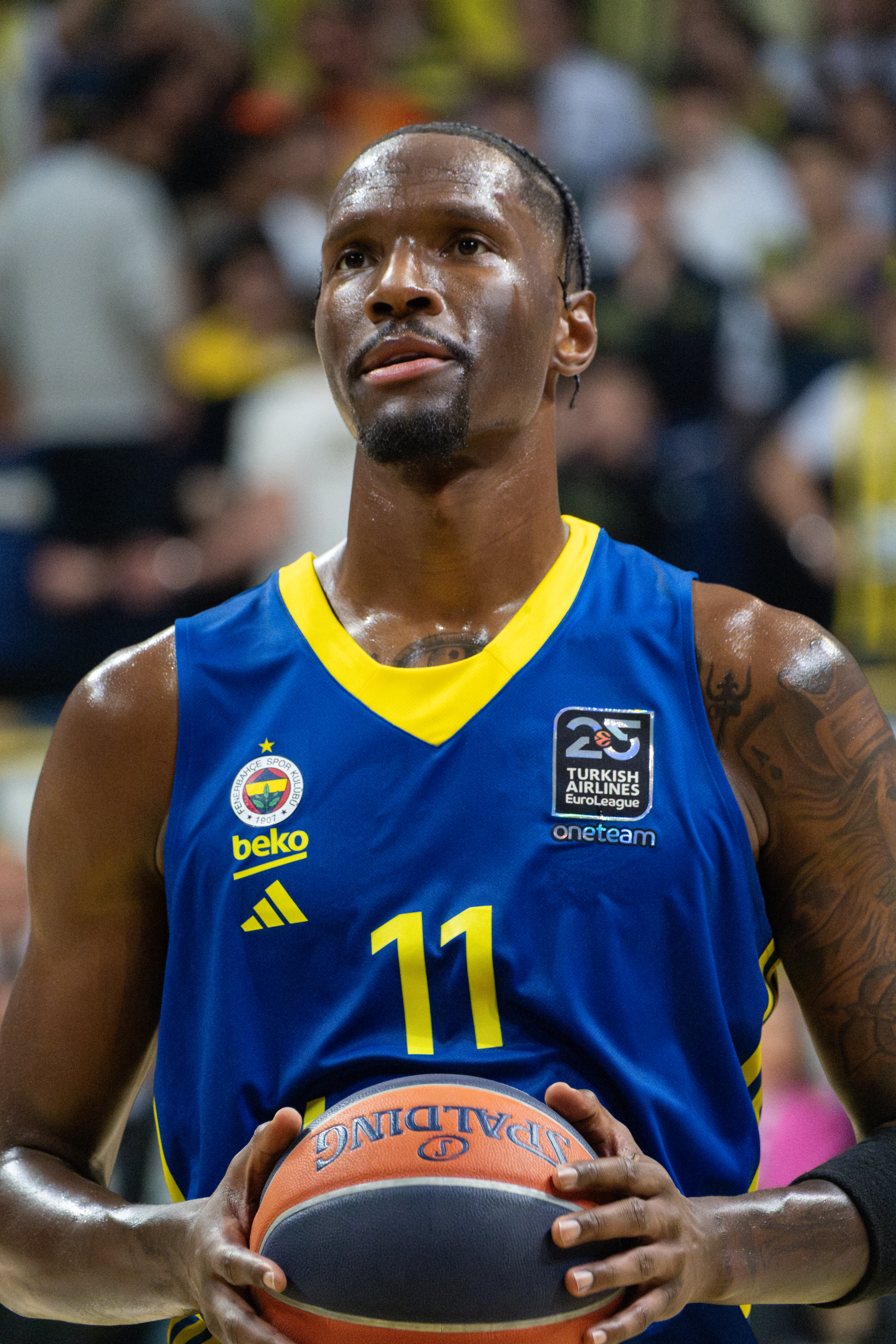
Nigel Hayes-Davis was awarded the EuroLeague Final Four MVP.

Turkish squad Fenerbahçe claimed the championship by defeating French team Monaco 81–70. The title game began with intense defense from both teams, though Monaco hit several buckets (led by Mike James) to build early leads of 13–4 and 16–8. Production from the Fenerbahçe bench by Wade Baldwin, Tarik Biberović, and Nicolò Melli reduced this gap down to a two-point 20–18 lead for Monaco by first quarter's end. Baldwin opened the second quarter's scoring with a three pointer to put Fenerbahçe ahead by one, but Monaco responded with a 7–0 run sparked by Alpha Diallo, compelling Fenerbahçe to call a timeout; when play resumed, Diallo answered with another basket, this one a deep three-pointer to put Monaco ahead by nine, 32–23. In response, Devon Hall led Fenerbahçe offensively on a 12–1 run to close out the first half while the defense stepped up, putting the team ahead 35–33 at halftime.

Šarūnas Jasikevičius won his first EuroLeague championship as head coach.

Monaco's offensive rebounding and free throw opportunities kept the game close throughout the third quarter, with the lead changing back and forth on multiple occasions; key three-pointers towards the end of the quarter by Marko Gudurić and Nigel Hayes-Davis put Fenerbahçe up 54–51 at the break. The defenses succeeded at the beginning of the fourth quarter, but then a Baldwin three-pointer and Errick McCollum three-point play concluded an 11–0 run that gave Fenerbahçe the game's first double-digit lead. Additional clutch offensive performances from Hayes-Davis and Hall increased and preserved Fenerbahçe's lead which they did not relinquish.

Hayes-Davis was awarded the Final Four MVP. In the championship game, he did not shoot well, making only 4 of 13 field goal attempts, but went a perfect 14 of 14 from the free throw line. He was the game's leading scorer and rebounder, with 23 points and nine rebounds respectively, and also had two steals, a block, and an assist. Monaco head coach Vassilis Spanoulis said, "We didn't distribute the ball properly. They hit some important shots, we played good defense, but their offense was better." This was the second EuroLeague championship for Fenerbahçe, following their 2017 title, and the first for Šarūnas Jasikevičius as a head coach. The team celebrated the title with an open-bus parade through Istanbul on May 27.

=== Championship game ===
25 May 2025	Monaco (French Federation of Basketball)	70–**81**	(Turkish Basketball Federation) **Fenerbahçe Beko**	Abu Dhabi, United Arab Emirates
19:00 (CEST)	Scoring by quarter: **20**–18, 13–**17**, 18–**19**, 19–**27**
	Pts: Diallo 19; Rebs: Theis 8 Asts: Okobo 5 PIR: Diallo 13		Pts: Hayes-Davis 23; Rebs: Hayes-Davis 9 Asts: Hall, Baldwin 3 PIR: Hayes-Davis 30	Arena: Etihad Arena; Attendance: 11,218; Referees: Carlos Peruga, Robert Lottermoser, Milan Nedović

Starters:			Pts	Reb	Ast
PG	55	(United States) Mike James	17	5	2
SG	32	(France) Matthew Strazel	13	3	1
SF	11	(United States) Alpha Diallo	19	3	2
PF	4	(United States) Jaron Blossomgame	5	6	0
C	10	(Germany) Daniel Theis	12	8	0
Reserves:					
G	0	(France) Élie Okobo	0	1	5
SG	8	(United States) Jordan Loyd	3	1	1
C	9	(Greece) Georgios Papagiannis	DNP		
C	14	(France) Mam Jaiteh	1	5	0
SF	22	(France) Terry Tarpey	DNP		
F	30	(United States) Vitto Brown	DNP		
PG	33	(Greece) Nick Calathes	0	1	2
Head coach:
(Hellenic Basketball Federation) Vassilis Spanoulis

**Monaco**	**Fenerbahçe**

Monaco	Statistics	Fenerbahçe
16/42 (38.1%)	2-pt field goals	16/38 (42.1%)
9/21 (42.9%)	3-pt field goals	9/22 (40.9%)
11/14 (78.6%)	Free throws	22/26 (84.6%)
15	Offensive rebounds	14
21	Defensive rebounds	24
36	Total rebounds	38
13	Assists	7
14	Turnovers	9
3	Steals	8
1	Blocks	2
26	Fouls	23

2024–25 EuroLeague champions

**Fenerbahçe Beko**
(2nd title)

Starters:			Pts	Reb	Ast
PG	23	(Serbia) Marko Gudurić	19	6	0
SG	20	(United States) Devon Hall	13	3	2
SF	50	(United States) Bonzie Colson	0	0	0
PF	11	(United States) Nigel Hayes-Davis	23	9	1
C	92	(Canada) Khem Birch	2	6	0
Reserves:					
G	0	(United States) Errick McCollum	3	3	1
G	2	(United States) Wade Baldwin	13	2	3
F/C	4	(Italy) Nicolò Melli	5	3	0
C	5	(Turkey) Sertaç Şanlı	0	0	0
SF	13	(Turkey) Tarik Biberović	3	1	0
F	21	(Canada) Dyshawn Pierre	0	1	0
C	44	(Angola) Jilson Bango	DNP		
Head coach:
(Lithuanian Basketball Federation) Šarūnas Jasikevičius
