= Martino Borghese =

Swiss footballer

Personal information
- Date of birth: 5 June 1987 (age 39)
- Place of birth: Basel, Switzerland
- Height: 1.97 m (6 ft 6 in)
- Position: Defender

Team information
- Current team: Locarno

Youth career
- –2006: Genoa

Senior career*
Years	Team	Apps	(Gls)
2006–2008	Genoa	2	(0)
2007–2008	→ Viterbese (loan)	8	(0)
2008	→ Pescara (loan)	0	(0)
2008–2010	Alghero	41	(2)
2010–2011	Gubbio	29	(6)
2011–2013	Bari	46	(4)
2013	→ Pro Vercelli (loan)	16	(1)
2013–2015	Spezia	10	(0)
2014	→ Lugano (loan)	10	(1)
2014–2015	→ Varese (loan)	30	(4)
2015	Como	11	(0)
2016–2018	Livorno	45	(3)
2018–2019	Como	27	(7)
2019–2022	Seregno	73	(5)
2022–	Locarno	0	(0)
- * Club domestic league appearances and goals as of 29 January 2022

Martino Borghese (born 5 June 1987) is a Swiss footballer who plays as a defender for Locarno. He won the International Sports Prize Italian Athlete of the Year award in 2011.

== Career ==
After playing for many Italian sides (playing mostly for Serie C1 or Serie C2 clubs), he was promoted to Serie B with A.S. Gubbio 1910 and was transferred to A.S. Bari in July 2011.

In January 2014 he was loaned to Swiss club Lugano.

In 2015, he was signed by Calcio Como. In 2016, he was signed by Livorno with Tonći Kukoč moved to opposite direction.

On 1 September 2018, he returned to Como, this time in the fourth-tier Serie D.

For the 2019–20 season, Como was promoted to Serie C, but Borghese moved to Serie D club Seregno. On 31 January 2022, Borghese's contract with Seregno was terminated by mutual consent.

On 16 February 2022, Borghese returned to Switzerland and signed with Locarno.

== Honours ==
=== Club ===
Gubbio

- Serie C1: 2010–11 (Group A)

Livorno

- Serie C: 2017–18 (Group A)

=== Individual ===
- International Sports Prize Italian Athlete of the Year: (2011)
