= 2009 Acropolis International Basketball Tournament =

Tournament details
- Arena: OAKA Olympic Indoor Hall; Athens, Greece
- Dates: August 24–26

Final positions
- Champions: Greece (14th title)
- Runners-up: Serbia
- Third place: Lithuania
- Fourth place: Russia

Awards and statistics
- MVP: (Greece) Vassilis Spanoulis
- Top scorer(s): (Lithuania) Marijonas Petravičius (14.7 points per game)

The Acropolis International Tournament 2009 was a basketball tournament held in OAKA Indoor Hall in Athens, Greece, from August 24 until August 26, 2009. This was the 23rd edition of the Acropolis International Basketball Tournament. The four participating teams were Greece, Lithuania, Russia and Serbia.

== Venues ==
Athens	Greece
Marousi, Athens	2009 Acropolis International Basketball Tournament is located in Greece
Olympic Indoor Hall; Capacity: 18,989	2009 Acropolis International Basketball Tournament is located in Greece

== Participating teams ==
- Greece
- Lithuania
- Russia
- Serbia

== Standings ==
Team	Pld	W	L	PF	PA	PD	Pts
Greece	3	3	0	212	201	+11	6
Serbia	3	2	1	213	195	+18	5
Lithuania	3	1	2	221	214	+7	4
Russia	3	0	3	183	219	−36	3

== Results ==
All times are local Central European Summer Time (UTC+2).

August 24
18:00

Lithuania	78–61	Russia
Scoring by quarter: 23–18, 13–16, 26–13, 16–14

O.A.C.A. Olympic Hall, Marousi, Athens

August 24
20:45

Greece	66–65	Serbia
Scoring by quarter: 22–15, 12–12, 13–20, 19–18

O.A.C.A. Olympic Hall, Marousi, Athens

August 25
18:00

Lithuania	70–78	Serbia
Scoring by quarter: 13–19, 18–19, 23–21, 16–19

O.A.C.A. Olympic Hall, Marousi, Athens

August 25
20:45

Greece	71–63	Russia
Scoring by quarter: 19–18, 22–21, 13–5, 17–19

O.A.C.A. Olympic Hall, Marousi, Athens

August 26
17:45

Serbia	70–59	Russia
Scoring by quarter: 13–13, 19–15, 17–4, 21–27

O.A.C.A. Olympic Hall, Marousi, Athens

August 26
20:45

Greece	75–73	Lithuania
Scoring by quarter: 14–15, 20–19, 16–25, 25–14

O.A.C.A. Olympic Hall, Marousi, Athens

== Final standing ==
Rank	Team
1st place, gold medalist(s)	Greece
2nd place, silver medalist(s)	Serbia
3rd place, bronze medalist(s)	Lithuania
4	Russia

2009 Acropolis International Basketball winners

Greece
14th title

Most Valuable Player
(Greece) Vassilis Spanoulis
