= Giuseppe Sciacca International Awards Sports Prize =

Internation journalist award for sports

- Awarded for: Outstanding achievement and impact in the field of sports
- Location: Rome, Italy
- First award: 2011
- Website: premiovexillumsciacca.it

The Giuseppe Sciacca International Awards Sports Prize (Italian: Giuseppe Sciacca Premi Internazionali Premio Sport) are sports athlete of the year awards. They are named in honor of Giuseppe Sciacca, an Italian architecture student that died in a parachuting accident in 1986. The Sports Prize awards are a part of the Giuseppe Sciacca International Awards, which also include awards for several other fields of endeavor. The awards are given to athletes that have been deemed to have made an enormous positive contribution in the field of sports. The award winners are chosen by the votes of a panel of international journalists, that come from dozens of different countries from around the world.

Athletes from all of the different sports worldwide, and from all of the different categories (men's, women's, paraplegic, etc.), that compete at all levels of competition (amateur, semi pro, pro) are eligible for the awards. There are two different types of Sports Prize awards. One is a national award that focuses on athletes from Italy, while the other is an international award, that is for athletes from all around the world. The first International Awards Sports Prize was given in the year 2011. It was won by Martino Borghese, a Swiss-Italian football player.

== Giuseppe Sciacca International Awards Sports Prize ==
Year	Athlete	Sport	Award	Ref.
2011	(Switzerland) - (Italy) Martino Borghese	Association football	Italian Athlete of the Year	
2012	(Cyprus) Pavlos Kontides	sailing	World Athlete of the Year	
2013	(Greece) Vassilis Spanoulis	Basketball	World Athlete of the Year	
2014	(Russia) Anisiya Neborako	Synchronized swimming	World Athlete of the Year	
2015	(Italy) Federico Morlacchi	Para swimming	World Athlete of the Year	
2016	No awards given			
2017	(Italy) Francesco Messori	Amputee football	Italian Athlete of the Year	
2018	(Russia) Alexey Bugaev	Para-alpine skiing	World Athlete of the Year (Men)	
2018	(Russia) Ekaterina Rumyantseva	Para biathlon & Para cross-country skiing	World Athlete of the Year (Women)	
2019	No awards given			
2020	Cancelled because of the COVID-19 pandemic.			
2021	(Italy) Mattia Agnese	Amateur association football	World Athlete of the Year	
2022	(Italy) Antonio Fantin	Para swimming	World Athlete of the Year	
2022	(Italy) Maila Ricca	Wheelchair association football	Italian Athlete of the Year	
2023	(Cuba) - (Italy) Andy Díaz	Athletics	World Athlete of the Year	
2024	(Italy) Federico Vanelli	Sports solidarity	Italian Athlete of the Year	
