= Vassilis Spanoulis =

Greek basketball player and coach (born 1982)

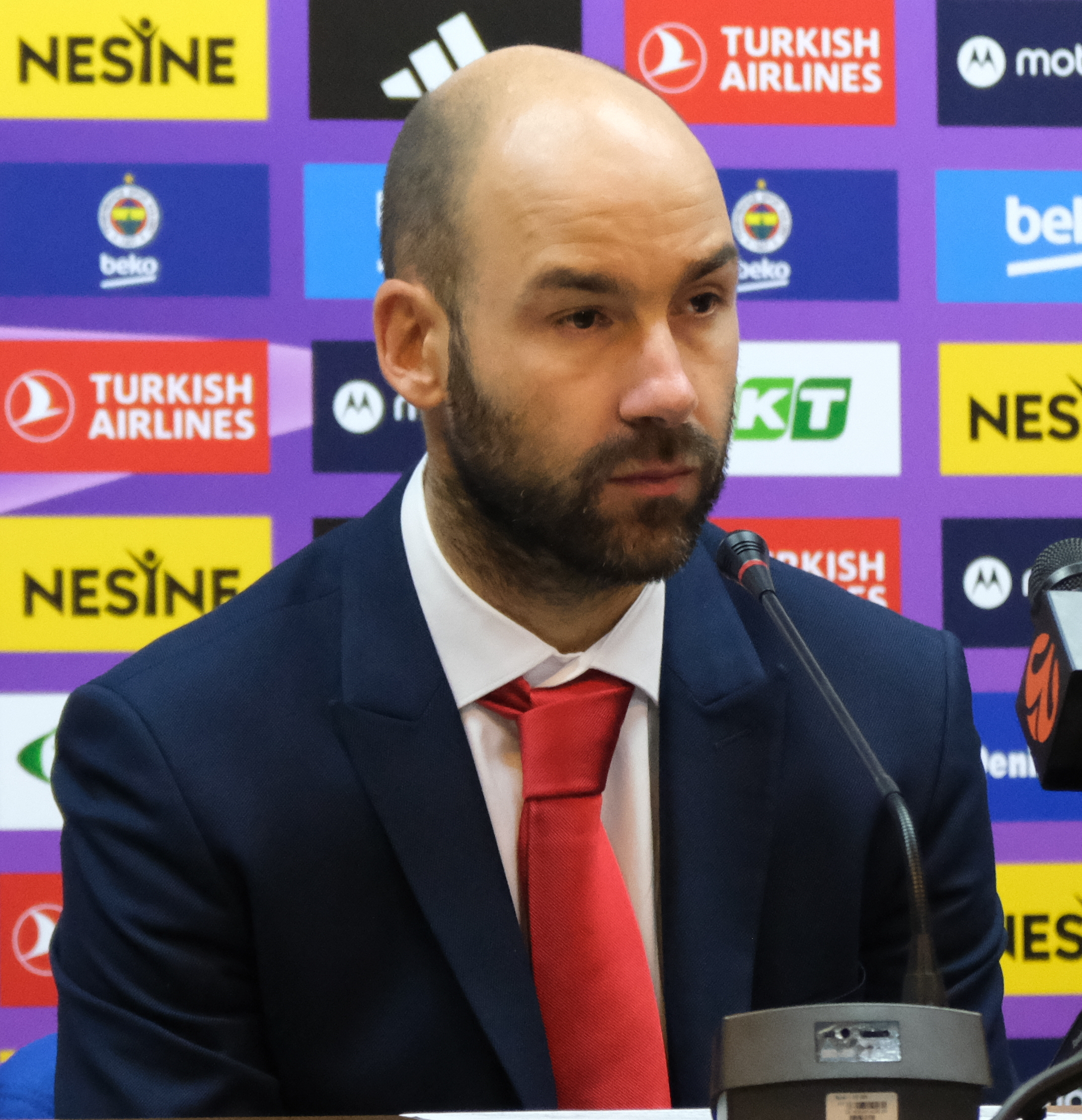
- Spanoulis in 2024

Aris Thessaloniki
- Title: Head coach
- League: Greek Basketball League; EuroCup

Personal information
- Born: 7 August 1982 (age 44) Larissa, Greece
- Listed height: 6 ft 4 in (1.93 m)
- Listed weight: 212 lb (96 kg)

Career information
- NBA draft: 2004: 2nd round, 50th overall pick
- Drafted by: Dallas Mavericks
- Playing career: 1999–2021
- Position: Point guard / shooting guard
- Number: 7, 10, 11, 6, 14, 4
- Coaching career: 2021–present

Career history

Playing
- 1999–2001: Gymnastikos S. Larissas
- 2001–2005: Maroussi Athens
- 2005–2006: Panathinaikos
- 2006–2007: Houston Rockets
- 2007–2010: Panathinaikos
- 2010–2021: Olympiacos

Coaching
- 2022–2024: Peristeri Athens
- 2023–present: Greece
- 2024–2026: AS Monaco
- 2026–present: Aris Thessaloniki

Career highlights
- As a player: FIBA Intercontinental Cup champion (2013); FIBA Intercontinental Cup MVP (2013); International Sports Prize's World Athlete of the Year (2013); European Triple Crown winner (2009); 101 Greats of European Basketball (2018); 3× EuroLeague champion (2009, 2012, 2013); EuroLeague MVP (2013); 3× EuroLeague Final Four MVP (2009, 2012, 2013); 3× All-Euroleague First Team (2012, 2013, 2015); 5× All-Euroleague Second Team (2006, 2009, 2011, 2014, 2018); EuroLeague 25th Anniversary Team (2025); Most Clutch Player in EuroLeague History (2017); EuroLeague's Best Captain (2018); EuroLeague 2010–2020 Player of the Decade (2020); EuroLeague 2010–2020 All-Decade Team (2020); EuroLeague Hall of Fame (2022); EuroCup Rookie of the Year (2005); EuroCup Sixth Man of the Year (2005); Balkan Athlete of the Year (2009); 7× Greek League champion (2006, 2008–2010, 2012, 2015, 2016); 4× Greek Cup winner (2006, 2008, 2009, 2011); 4× Greek League MVP (2005, 2009, 2012, 2016); 3× Greek League Finals MVP (2006, 2008 , 2016); 10× All-Greek League Team (2005, 2006, 2008, 2009, 2011–2013, 2015–2017, 2018, 2019); 4× Greek League assists leader (2008, 2012, 2013, 2015); 10× Greek All-Star (2005, 2006, 2008–2011, 2013, 2014, 2018, 2019); Greek League Best Young Player (2003); Greek League Most Improved Player (2004); 2× Greek League Most Popular Player (2015, 2017); Greek League Hall of Fame (2022); No. 7 retired by Olympiacos (2023); The Greatest of All Time Athlete in the history of multi-sport club Olympiacos Piraeus (2025); FIBA EuroStar (2007); FIBA EuroBasket 2000–2020 Dream Team (2020); FIBA Summer Olympics 1992–2020 Dream Team (2020); 8× Acropolis Tournament champion (2005–2010, 2013, 2015); 2× Acropolis Tournament MVP (2007, 2009); FIBA U20 EuroBasket MVP (2002); Panhellenic Youth Championship champion (1999); Panhellenic Youth Championship MVP (1999); Professional Greek League career stats leaders: Greek League all-time leading scorer; Greek League all-time leader in assists; As a head coach: French League Cup winner (2026); French Supercup winner (2025); FIBA Champions League Coach of the Year (2024)

Career statistics
- Points: 13,533
- Stats at NBA.com
- Stats at Basketball Reference
Medals
Event	1st	2nd	3rd
FIBA World Cup	0	1	0
FIBA Stanković World Cup	1	0	0
FIBA EuroBasket	1	0	1
Mediterranean Games	0	1	0
FIBA U-20 EuroBasket	1	0	0
DBB U-18 World Tournament	0	1	0
FIBA U-18 EuroBasket	0	0	1
Total	3	3	2
Men's basketball
Representing Greece
FIBA World Cup
Silver medal – second place	2006 Japan	
FIBA Stanković World Cup
Gold medal – first place	2006 China	
FIBA EuroBasket
Gold medal – first place	2005 Serbia & Montenegro	
Bronze medal – third place	2009 Poland	
Mediterranean Games
Silver medal – second place	2001 Tunisia	
FIBA U-20 EuroBasket
Gold medal – first place	2002 Lithuania	U-20 Team
DBB U-18 World Tournament
Silver medal – second place	2000 Mannheim	Under-18
FIBA U-18 EuroBasket
Bronze medal – third place	2000 Croatia	U-18 Team
Head coach for Greece
FIBA EuroBasket
Bronze medal – third place	2025 Cyprus–Finland–Poland–Latvia	

Vassilis Spanoulis (Greek: Βασίλης Σπανούλης), also commonly known as Bill Spanoulis (Greek: Μπιλ Σπανούλης), or Kill Bill (Greek: Μπίλλυ Σπανούλης; born 7 August 1982) is a Greek professional basketball coach and former player who is currently the head coach of the senior men's Greek national team and Greek basketball club Aris Thessaloniki. He was the head coach of AS Monaco from 2024 until March 2026, when the club and Spanoulis mutually agreed to part ways.

In the sport of basketball, his signature move is a cut originating from under the rim where the player moves up the floor to receive a handoff from another player, which is commonly known as "Spanoulis Action", "The Spanoulis System", or simply "Spanoulis". During his pro playing career, at a height of 6 ft 4 in (1.93 m) tall, and a weight of 212 lb (96 kg), Spanoulis played as a point guard-shooting guard, and was nicknamed Kill Bill, V-Span, Greek Thunder, and MVP ("Most Vassilis Player"). Spanoulis was named the Balkan Athlete of the Year in 2009, the Eurobasket Player of the Year in 2012 and 2013, the International Sports Prize's World Athlete of the Year in 2013, and the EuroLeague MVP the same year. He earned a record eight All-EuroLeague Team selections and was voted the EuroLeague's 2010–2020 Player of the Decade. Spanoulis retired as the EuroLeague's all-time career leader in assists and total points scored. In 2025, Spanoulis was voted The Greatest of All Time (GOAT) Athlete in the 100-year history of Olympiacos Piraeus CFP, which is the multi-sport club with the most championships won in sports history, with over 300 awards.

During his professional club playing career, on the international level, Spanoulis was a FIBA World Club Championship champion, a European Triple Crown winner, a three-time EuroLeague champion and five-time EuroLeague finalist, and a FIBA Europe League finalist. While on the national domestic level, Spanoulis was a seven-time Greek Basket League champion, thirteen-time Greek Basket League finalist, and a four-time Greek Cup winner and nine-time Greek Cup finalist. He spent most of his playing career in the Greek Basket League, winning four Greek League titles as a member of Panathinaikos Athens, and three Greek League titles as a member of Olympiacos Piraeus. With those same two Greek clubs, he also won three EuroLeague titles, one with the former club (2009), and two consecutively (2012 and 2013) with the latter. In total, in four seasons with Panathinaikos, Spanoulis won eight club championship titles, and in eleven seasons with Olympiacos, he won seven club championship titles.

In international competitions of the national team, Spanoulis played an instrumental role in the gold medal win of the senior men's Greek national team, at the 2005 FIBA EuroBasket. He was also one of the main stars of Greece's 2006 FIBA World Cup silver medal team, as he led Greece with 22 points scored in their memorable victory over Team USA, by a score of 101–95, in the tournament's semifinals. It was however, Greece's bronze medal win at the 2009 FIBA EuroBasket, that emphasized Spanoulis' leadership within an injury-plagued Greek national team, and consequently earned him a EuroBasket All-Star Five honor. In 2020, Spanoulis was named to the FIBA Summer Olympics 1992–2020 Dream Team, which consisted of the 25 best players in FIBA Summer Olympics history, since the inclusion of NBA players, in 1992, and to the FIBA EuroBasket 2000–2020 Dream Team, which consisted of the five best players of the FIBA EuroBasket, since the year 2000.

Spanoulis, whose clutch end-of-game play earned him the nickname "Kill Bill", is widely considered to be one of the greatest basketball players in Europe. In 2017, the European basketball expert and historian, Vladimir Stanković, and the EuroLeague's expert basketball panel, named Spanoulis "The Most Clutch Player in EuroLeague History". In 2018, he was named to the 101 Greats of European Basketball selection. Along with the Spanish player Juan Carlos Navarro, Spanoulis was one of just two players, that were still active players at the time, that were specially selected for the honor. In 2020, Spanoulis was named the "Best EuroLeague Player of The 2010s Decade" by the readers of the website Eurohoops.net. HoopsHype.com named Spanoulis one of the 75 Greatest International Players Ever in 2021. In 2022, Spanoulis was named a EuroLeague Legend, which is the EuroLeague's Hall of Fame award. Spanoulis was also inducted into the Greek Basket League Hall of Fame, in 2022. Spanoulis' number 7 jersey was retired by the Greek EuroLeague club Olympiacos Piraeus, on 17 September 2023. In October 2023, Spanoulis was voted the EuroLeague's "GOAT" ("Greatest of All Time") player, in a BasketNews.com poll of EuroLeague players. Spanoulis received 40% of the vote total, while the second-placed vote-getter, Nando de Colo, received a total of 14% of the vote.

== Early life and youth career ==
Spanoulis was born in Larissa, Greece, on 7 August 1982. His father Thanasis Spanoulis, was the owner of a drug store, and his mother Georgia Spanouli, was a bank clerk. Spanoulis was the couple's second and last child, being born three years after his older brother Dimitris.

At the age of 7, Spanoulis began training in the sports of judo, football, swimming, and basketball. As a youth, Spanoulis idolized the basketball players Michael Jordan and Nikos Galis. In 1994, at the age of 12, Spanoulis joined the youth basketball program of the multi-sports club Gymnastikos S. Larissas. Spanoulis' father Thanasis, died of cancer, on 4 November 1997, when Spanoulis was 15 years old.

In 1999, at the age of 16, Spanoulis won the 1998–99 season's national under-18 club championship of Greece. He led Keravnos Larissa, the youth basketball subsidiary of Gymnastikos S. Larissas, to the title of the Panhellenic Youth Championship. He was the championship's leading scorer and Most Valuable Player. In the competition's semifinals, he scored 40 points against the youth team of Aris Thessaloniki. In the competition's final, he led his team to a 64–61 victory over the youth team of Olympiacos Piraeus. He hit the game-winning 3-point shot, to win the title, at the buzzer.

In 2000, at the age of 17, Spanoulis won the silver medal at the DBB Albert Schweitzer Under-18 World Tournament and the bronze medal at the 2000 FIBA Under-18 EuroBasket. In 2002, at the age of 19, Spanoulis won the gold medal at the 2002 FIBA Under-20 EuroBasket, in which he made the game-winning free-throws.

== Professional career ==
Spanoulis first played pro club basketball with Gymnastikos S. Larissas and enjoyed a highly successful career start. His skill set earned him a transfer to Athens and Maroussi, where he won the Greek Basket League's Best Young Player award for the 2002–03 season. Following an impressive 2004–05 season, during which he was the Greek Basket League Top Scorer, and helped lead Maroussi to the Greek Basket League's finals and the 2005 EuroCup quarterfinals, he moved to Panathinaikos, where he became one of European basketball's major stars. In the 2005–06 EuroLeague season, Spanoulis made his debut in the EuroLeague in impressive fashion, earning his first All-EuroLeague Team selection, as a rookie in the competition. After a stint in the NBA with the Houston Rockets, during the 2006–07 season, he returned to Panathinaikos and helped lead them to a EuroLeague title in 2009, being voted the EuroLeague Final Four MVP in the process.

Spanoulis' transfer from Panathinaikos to Olympiacos, in the summer of 2010, marked a new step in his career, given Olympiacos' feisty rivalry with Panathinaikos. Spanoulis' move from Panathinaikos to Olympiacos, is generally considered to be one of the biggest transfers and at the same time one of the biggest betrayals in the history of Greek sports. Spanoulis despite being given the opportunity to compete at the highest level with Panathinaikos and being accepted back after his unsuccessful spell in the NBA decided to leave Athens for Piraeus. It also led to perhaps the greatest individual rivalry in the history of Greek sports, between Spanoulis and Panathinaikos player Dimitris Diamantidis. Within a young and rebuilding Olympiacos team, which eventually became well known by its nickname, "The Comeback Kids", Spanoulis not only led the club to an improbable EuroLeague title run in 2012, but he also went on to lead the team to a historical back-to-back EuroLeague championship repeat in 2013. In the process, he gained another two EuroLeague Final Four MVP awards, thus joining Toni Kukoč, as the only two players in the history of European basketball to achieve that distinction on three occasions. Under his leadership, Olympiacos reached another two EuroLeague Finals, in 2015 and 2017.

=== Gymnastikos S. Larissas ===
Spanoulis joined the youth system of the Greek sports club Gymnastikos, and its subsidiary youth club Keravnos, in Larissa, in 1994. He played with Keravnos, in the Greek junior club levels, from 1994 to 1999. After that, he played two seasons of professional club basketball with the senior men's club of Gymnastikos, from 1999 to 2001.

==== 1999–00 season ====
Spanoulis made his professional club debut in the year 1999, at the age of 17, with the senior club of Gymnastikos S. Larissas, in the 1999–00 season. He played that season in the 2nd-tier level Greek 2nd Division, with Gymnastikos. In 13 Greek 2nd Division games played, he scored a total of 90 points, for a scoring average of 6.9 points per game.

==== 2000–01 season ====
In the 2000–01 season, Spanoulis again played in the 2nd-tier level Greek 2nd Division, with Gymnastikos S. Larissas. In 26 Greek 2nd Division games played, he scored a total of 213 points, for a scoring average of 8.2 points per game.

=== Maroussi ===
After playing two seasons with Gymnastikos S. Larissas, in the Greek 2nd Division, Spanoulis signed a four-year contract with Maroussi of the top-tier level Greek Basket League, the European-wide 3rd-tier level FIBA Korać Cup, and later, the European-wide 2nd-tier level EuroCup. Maroussi paid Gymnastikos S.Larissas a contract buyout in the amount of 50 million Greek drachmas, in order to secure his player rights. When Spanoulis first joined Maroussi, the team's head coach at the time, Nikos Linardos, had the then 19-year-old Spanoulis play one-on-one against the well-known veteran EuroLeague player Michael Koch. After their one-on-one match, Koch reportedly said to Linardos, "Coach, this kid is a star. He will be a great basketball player."

==== 2001–02 season ====
During the 2001–02 season, Spanoulis helped to lead Maroussi to the Greek Cup Final. This was the first time the team had ever made it to the Greek Cup title game. Maroussi also competed in the European-wide 3rd-tier level FIBA Korać Cup's 2001–02 season.

==== 2002–03 season ====
Spanoulis was voted the Greek Basket League's Best Young Player, of the 2002–03 season. He also played with Maroussi in the European-wide 3rd-tier level FIBA Europe Champions Cup's 2002–03 season.

==== 2003–04 season ====
In the 2003–04 season, Spanoulis helped to lead Maroussi to the Greek Basket League Finals. He also helped lead Maroussi to the 2003–04 season's FIBA Europe League Final. In the FIBA Europe League, Spanoulis averaged 10.8 points per game, and 6.4 assists per game, off the bench for Maroussi. He also shot 40% from three-point range. He was also named the Greek League Most Improved Player that same season.

Spanoulis was then drafted in the 2nd round of the 2004 NBA draft, by the Dallas Mavericks, following this sudden emergence. He also made it onto the Greece men's national basketball team, at the 2004 Athens Summer Olympic Games.

==== 2004–05 season ====
In the Greek Basket League 2004–05 season, his last season with Maroussi, Spanoulis averaged 15.9 points per game, and shot 37.8% from 3-point range, in 35 games played in the Greek Basket League competition. He was the Greek Basket League Top Scorer for the season. He then averaged 15.2 points per game, and shot 40.0% from 3-point range, in 12 games of play, in the European-wide 2nd-tier level EuroCup's 2004–05 season. For the year in total, Spanoulis averaged 15.7 points per game, and shot 38.3% from 3-point range, in 47 games played with Maroussi. He played in the 2005 Greek League All-Star Game and was named to the Greek Basket League's Best Five Team.

This was a breakthrough year for Vassilis, as he had averaged 11.1 points per game the previous season. He was one of the most improved players in Europe for the year. He helped to lead Maroussi to the 2nd place of the Greek Basket League, for the regular season. At the end of the year, Spanoulis was voted the European 6th Man of the Year, and Rookie of the Year in the EuroCup.

=== Panathinaikos Athens ===
==== 2005–06 season ====
Following his outstanding season in 2004–05 with Maroussi, Spanoulis signed a 3-year contract worth €1.6 million net income, with EuroLeague powerhouse Panathinaikos Athens. Spanoulis and his agent, Miško Ražnatović, set the contract terms so that Spanoulis would have a buyout clause after just one year and set the buyout amount at US $400,000. This was Spanoulis' first season playing at the highest European-wide professional club level.

With Panathinaikos, in the Greek Basket League 2005–06 season, he won both the Greek Basket League championship and the Greek Cup. His team went 24–2 during the Greek Basket League regular season, and 8–0 during the Greek League playoffs, for an overall record of 32–2 in the national domestic league championship, and went undefeated in the Greek Cup, at 5–0, for an overall record of 37–2 in Greek competitions. He played in the 2006 Greek League All-Star Game and was named to the Greek Basket League's Best Five Team.

Spanoulis was also selected to the EuroLeague 2005–06 season's All-EuroLeague Second Team.

In 28.8 minutes per game of play, during the 2005–06 EuroLeague competition, Spanoulis averaged 14.6 points, 3.1 assists, 2.0 rebounds, and 1.4 steals, in 23 games of EuroLeague play, with Panathinaikos Athens for the season. He also shot 61.8% in 2-point shooting, and 36.8% from 3-point range; 53.4% overall.

He was the team's leading scorer, even though he often came off the bench. He won the EuroLeague MVP of the Round award twice during the season. In 2005–06, his team finished the EuroLeague with a record of 16–7. Spanoulis was also voted as the 7th best worldwide European player of the year (including NBA players) in 2006, by FIBA Europe, in their FIBA Europe Player of the Year award voting.

Many fans began calling him, "Euro Kobe".

=== Houston Rockets ===
On 19 July 2006 Spanoulis opted out of the final two years of his contract with Panathinaikos Athens and signed a three-year deal (2 years guaranteed) with the NBA's Houston Rockets, who paid for his contract buyout from Panathinaikos. The contract was worth $5.832 million. His buyout from Panathinaikos was $400,000.

The contract amount was for an average of $1.944 million per season. The Rockets had acquired the rights to Spanoulis on draft night (24 June 2004), when Houston swapped draft pick #55 Luis Flores, and cash considerations of $300,000 with the Dallas Mavericks, for Spanoulis (pick #50).

"He's a very versatile ball handler," Rockets [then] general manager, Carroll Dawson, said. "He's a good finisher and a very good prospect. He wants to be a great player. Everybody is going to like this young man because he is a very hard-nosed player. We have watched his progress very closely," Dawson said. "It's a big adjustment to come to the NBA from Europe, but he is a hard worker."

Rockets [then] Director of Player Personnel, Dennis Lindsey, stated the following about Spanoulis before signing him to the team. "We're very, very happy with his progress," said Lindsey. "He changed clubs this year from Maroussi to the bigger club this year, Panathinaikos. For those not familiar with European basketball, they are like the New York Yankees of Greece and one of the two or three better organizations in Europe. They are an NBA-level club. From our standpoint, we really like what Vassilis has done. He is their leading scorer. They are 9–1 in the EuroLeague and they have already qualified for the top sixteen."

Lindsey praised Spanoulis' offensive ability. "He's got a couple of characteristics that we like," added Lindsey. "He can really drive and get the ball in the paint, and he's relentless with it. He kind of plays basketball like a fullback a little bit, where he just kind of breaks through the line and there's contact on a lot of plays."

"The owner and Jeff and Carroll really like what they've seen so far and we've made a couple of trips over and hopefully in the near future we can have him as a Rocket because we think he can help us."

==== 2006–07 NBA season ====
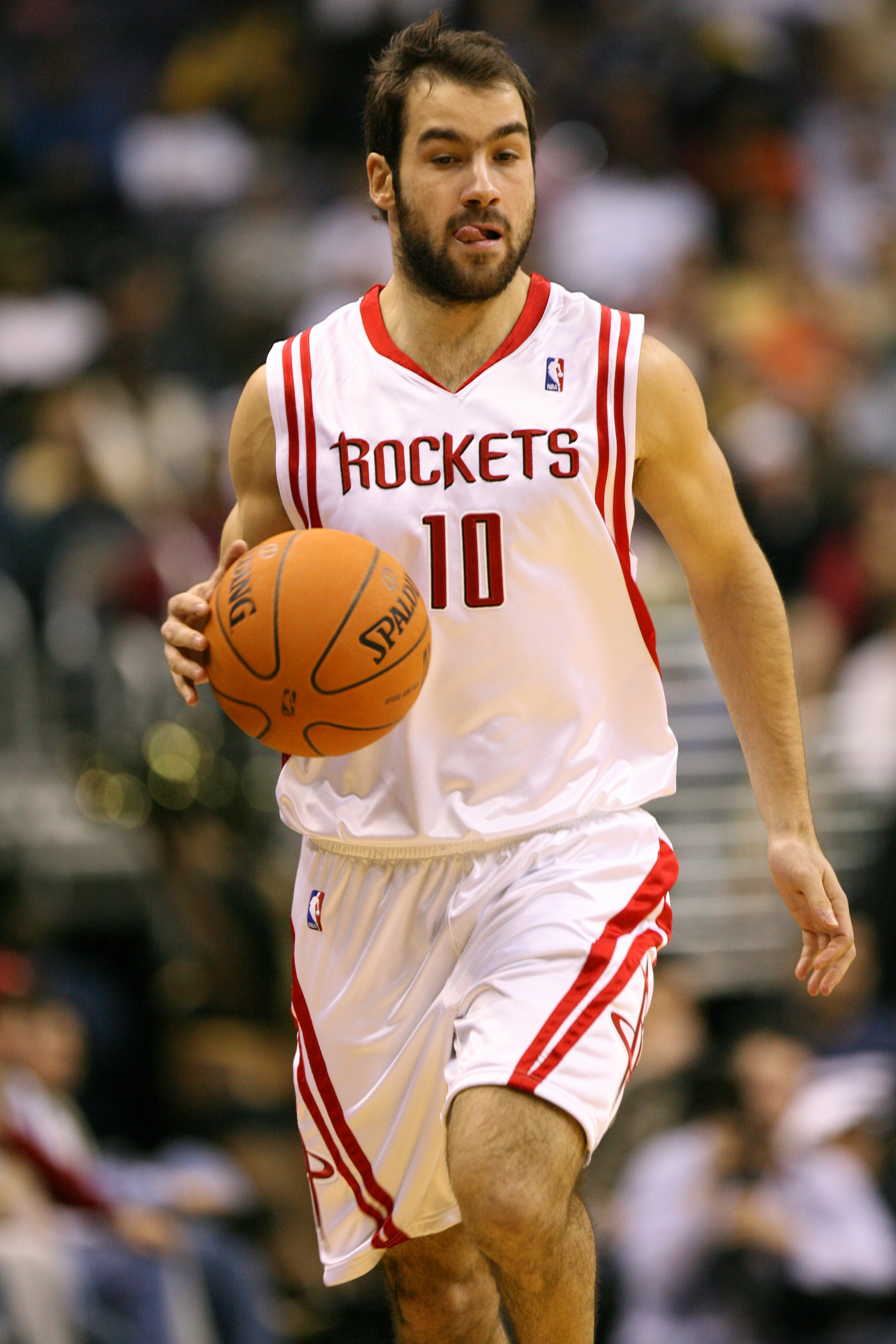
Spanoulis in 2006, during the 2006–07 season, with the NBA's Houston Rockets.

Spanoulis saw limited playing time with the Houston Rockets during his rookie NBA year in 2006–07, averaging 2.7 points and 0.9 assists in 8.8 minutes per game, on 31.9% field goal shooting (17.2% from behind the 3-point line), in 31 games played off the bench.

During Spanoulis' first NBA season, there was a dispute between him and Rockets head coach, Jeff Van Gundy, over playing time. There was an issue between the team's management, Spanoulis, and the coach as well, over the contract that Spanoulis had signed. To sign with the Rockets, and fulfill his dreams of playing in the NBA, Spanoulis took a considerably smaller contract than the one that was being offered to him by his Greek team, Panathinaikos Athens. He still had two years under his contract with Panathinaikos, but his buyout was small and could be paid by the Rockets.

Spanoulis agreed to play for Houston for $1.944 million gross income per season, for 3 years, passing up on his former team Panathinaikos's much larger offer of €1.6 million net income per season, over 3 years, just for a chance of playing in the NBA. Spanoulis made the Rockets' rotation, but there was a falling out between him and Rockets coach Van Gundy, after Van Gundy benched Spanoulis, after the coach claimed that he had played poorly, citing that rookie players are dangerous for coaches that are in contract years, and that Spanoulis was too turnover prone and lacking in outside shooting touch to be a good fit in Van Gundy's offensive system design. Said Van Gundy about the situation: "(Spanoulis) says, 'I was [Tracy] McGrady back home.' Great. McGrady is McGrady here,"..."I feel badly for him. He feels he was misled. Frankly, he's been his own worst enemy in many ways. Some of it is excuses. His turnovers have been high; his fouls have been high; his shooting percentage has been low. I would rather anybody start out with self-evaluation—what can I do better?—versus lash out and blame. Because I'm not playing him now doesn't mean he won't play in the future, or we don't feel he could be a good player. I think he's allowed his disappointment to go to discouragement, which has, at times, stunted his improvement. We'll see. We'll see."

Spanoulis was traded by the Rockets to the San Antonio Spurs, on 12 July 2007, along with a 2009 second-round draft pick, in exchange for center Jackie Butler, and the rights to Argentinian power forward Luis Scola. On 19 August 2007, the Spurs released Spanoulis, giving him the chance to return to Greece to play for Panathinaikos as he had requested. This was officially announced on 23 August 2007.

Reportedly due to "family reasons," Spanoulis decided that he would not remain in the NBA, with his agent going as far as comparing the Rockets' reluctance to break his contract to slavery. Spanoulis, instead opted to return to Panathinaikos, to once again play in the Greek Basket League and the EuroLeague.

In June 2013, Spanoulis claimed that Van Gundy told him on the first day he arrived at Houston that since he was a rookie, and unfamiliar to Van Gundy, he would be benched for the season. Spanoulis also claimed that the Rockets' next head coach, Rick Adelman, wanted to keep him and that both Tony Parker and Gregg Popovich of the San Antonio Spurs were interested in having him on their team.

In November 2015, the General Manager of the San Antonio Spurs, R.C. Buford, confirmed to the Greek press that the Spurs made the trade for Spanoulis to keep him and have him play on their team. Buford also confirmed that it was Spanoulis' choice to not play with the Spurs and to return to play in Greece.

=== Back to Panathinaikos Athens ===
==== 2007–08 season ====
On 19 August 2007, Spanoulis was released by the San Antonio Spurs, after deciding he wanted to play in Greece during the 2007–08 season. This was because his mother was in poor health at that time, and that Spanoulis wanted to be near her. Spanoulis signed a 3-year contract with Panathinaikos, the then defending EuroLeague champions. Spanoulis was signed to the team to play at both the point guard and shooting guard positions, along with fellow Greek national team star, Dimitris Diamantidis. Former NBA player and Lithuanian national team star, Šarūnas Jasikevičius, would also later sign with Panathinaikos. Spanoulis, Diamantidis, and Jasikevičius would go on to form the team's legendary Three Playmakers Offensive System, as utilized by the team's then-head coach, Željko Obradović.

The contract Spanoulis signed was for 3-years, at €5.5 million net income salary, plus a $1,166,400 contract buyout from his NBA San Antonio Spurs contract (Panathinaikos paid the buyout, so it did not count against the Spurs' salary cap). Spanoulis' agent set up the contract so that Spanoulis could opt out of it after one year. Spanoulis originally stated that, after the first year of his contract, he might opt out of it and return to San Antonio to play in the NBA again.

During the 2007–08 season, Spanoulis led his team, Panathinaikos, in both points scored (661) and assists (215), over 36 games played in the Greek Basket League 2007–08 season, and 20 games played in the EuroLeague 2007–08 season. He averaged 11.8 points per game and 3.8 assists per game for the season, in 56 games total. Spanoulis was the Greek Basket League assists leader. He was voted as a starter to the Greek League All-Star Game, and to the Greek Basket League's Best Five Team.

Spanoulis helped Panathinaikos win the Greek basketball double, as the club won both the Greek Basket League championship and the Greek Cup title in 2008. In the Greek Cup Final, against Panathinaikos' arch-rival Olympiacos, Spanoulis helped to lead his team to the championship cup victory, by scoring 20 points and dishing out 7 assists.

==== 2008–09 season ====
In 2009, Spanoulis led Panathinaikos to the coveted European Triple Crown title, as they won the EuroLeague 2008–09 season's championship, the Greek League 2008–09 season's championship, and the 2009 Greek Cup title, all in the same club season. Panathinaikos Athens' 2008–09 season team is often considered to be the best EuroLeague team of all time, by European basketball media and analysts. During the 2008–09 club season, Spanoulis was named to the All-EuroLeague Team, and he was also named the EuroLeague Final Four MVP. In addition to that, he was named to the Greek Basket League Best Five, and he was also named the 2009 Greek League MVP.

After the 2008–09 club season, Spanoulis finished the year of 2009, by leading the senior Greek national team to the bronze medal at the 2009 EuroBasket, where he was also named to the EuroBasket All-Tournament Team. Due to all his accomplishments and achievements, Spanoulis won the BTA Balkan Athlete of the Year, which is an award that is given to the calendar year's best athlete that has citizenship in one of the twelve nations of the Balkans region. Spanoulis is the only basketball player to ever win the award.

==== 2009–10 season ====
Spanoulis won the Greek League's 2009–10 season championship, with Panathinaikos.

=== Olympiacos Piraeus ===
==== 2010–11 season ====
In July 2010, after much speculation concerning his free agency and his next contract, Spanoulis signed a three-year contract with the Greek Basket League club Olympiacos Piraeus, worth €13.2 million gross income, or €7.2 million net income (€2.4 million net income per season), plus team performance bonuses. In his first year with Olympiacos, Spanoulis won the Greek Cup, was named to the EuroLeague's All Second Team, and was the Greek Basket League assists leader.

==== 2011–12 season ====
In 2012, Spanoulis won both the 2012 EuroLeague and Greek Basket League championships. He was also named to the All-EuroLeague First Team, and won the EuroLeague Final Four MVP, for the second time in his career. He became the fourth player to win the award multiple times. Spanoulis' assist, on Georgios Printezis' game-winning shot against the Russian VTB United League club CSKA Moscow, at the end of the 2012 EuroLeague Final, is widely considered to be the greatest of all-time highlight in the history of the EuroLeague.

Furthermore, Spanoulis once again led the Greek League in assists. He was also named the Greek Basket League MVP, and the Greek Basket League Finals MVP. Finally, Spanoulis was named the Eurobasket News All-Europe Player of the Year in 2012. Spanoulis and Printezis, whose duo were nicknamed, "Greek Thunder (Spanoulis) and Greek Lightning (Printezis)", would go on to form one of the greatest player duos in the history of the EuroLeague.

==== 2012–13 season ====
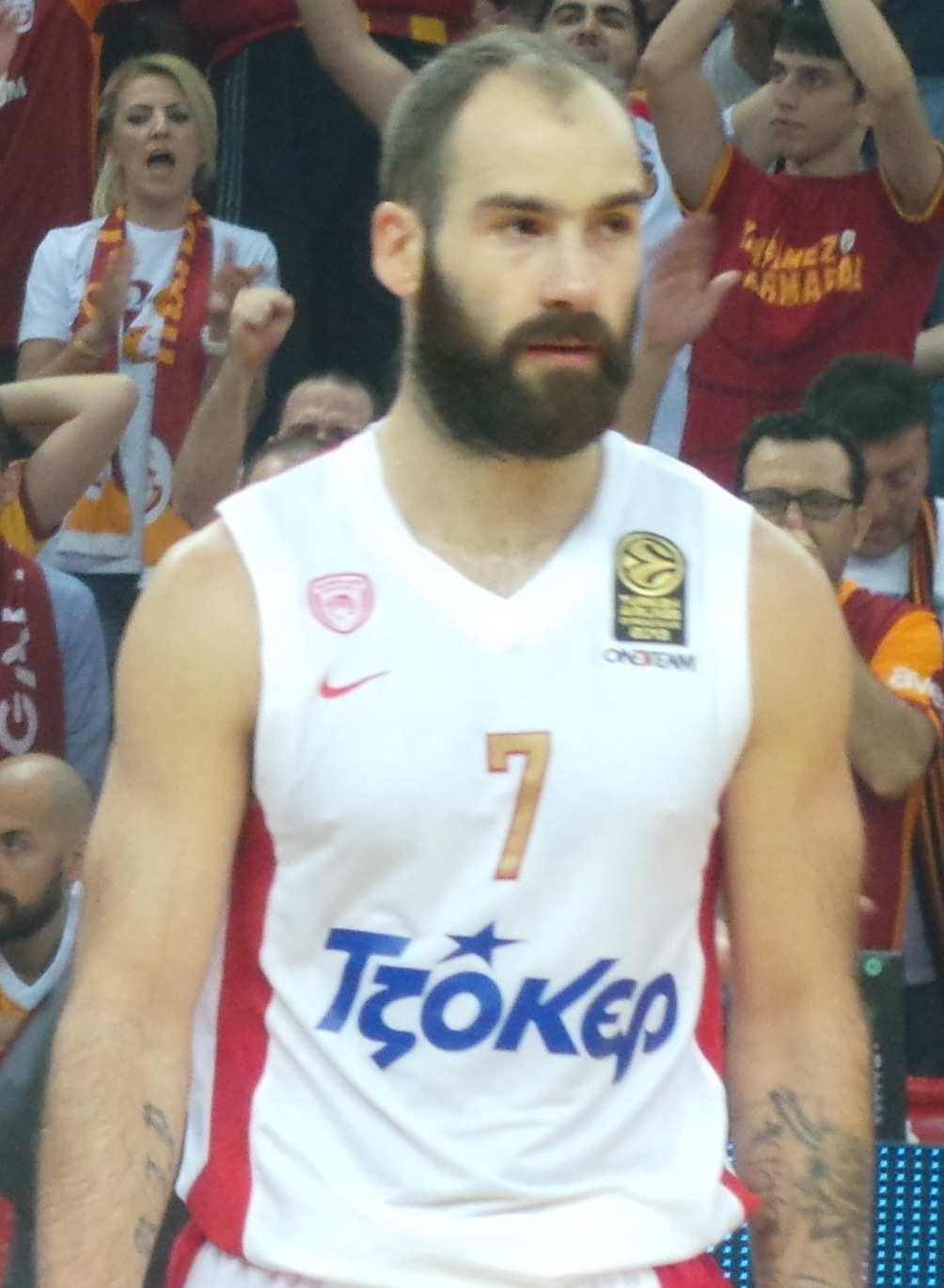
Spanoulis, while playing for Olympiacos in 2013.

Spanoulis was named the EuroLeague MVP in 2013. He was also the EuroLeague Finals Top Scorer, and was named the EuroLeague Final Four MVP, after leading Olympiacos to the 2013 EuroLeague championship title, which completed Olympiacos Piraeus' back-to-back EuroLeague championship run (2012 and 2013). He became just the second player to win both the EuroLeague MVP and the EuroLeague Final Four MVP in the same season, along with Dimitris Diamantidis; and he also became just the second player to win the EuroLeague Final Four MVP award 3 times, along with Toni Kukoč.

Spanoulis also won the International Sports Prize's World Athlete of the Year award in 2013. He was also named the Eurobasket News All-Europe Player of the Year, for the second time, in 2013.

==== 2013–14 season ====
Spanoulis signed a 3-year contract extension, worth €6 million net income (€2 million net income per season), plus team performance bonuses, with Olympiacos in July 2013. With Olympiacos, he won the 2013 edition of the FIBA Intercontinental Cup, being named the MVP of the tournament. In May 2014, he was named to the All-EuroLeague Team, for the sixth time in his career.

==== 2014–15 season ====
In May 2015, Spanoulis was chosen to the All-EuroLeague First Team, for his performance during the season, his seventh All-EuroLeague Team honour. He led Olympiacos to the 2015 EuroLeague Final, and he also won the 2014–15 season's Greek League championship with Olympiacos and was voted the MVP of the league's finals.

==== 2015–16 season ====
Spanoulis won the 2015–16 season's Greek League championship. In game 2 of the 2015–16 Greek League Finals, against Olympiacos' arch-rivals, Panathinaikos, Spanoulis hit a game-winning buzzer-beating 3-pointer. In game 3 of the Greek League Finals, he scored 11 points in the last 3 minutes and 1 second of the 4th quarter, to seal the victory for his team. In game 4 of the Greek League Finals, held at Nikos Galis Olympic Indoor Hall, Olympiacos won in the game's second overtime period, after Spanoulis hit another game-winning 3-point field goal, with 1.9 seconds remaining in the game. Spanoulis' game four game-winning shot, which is often referred to simply as "The Shot", is widely considered to be the most famous game-winning shot in the history of European basketball.

Spanoulis was subsequently named the 2016 Greek League MVP, and the 2016 Greek League Finals MVP.

==== 2016–17 season ====
In June 2016, Spanoulis signed a new 2-year contract extension with Olympiacos, lasting through the 2017–18 season. The contract was worth €3 million net income (€1.5 million net income per season). During that season's EuroLeague competition, Euroleague.net named Spanoulis the "Most Clutch Player in EuroLeague History". That same season, Spanoulis eventually led Olympiacos to the 2017 EuroLeague Final.

==== 2017–18 season ====
During the 2017–18 season, Spanoulis became the EuroLeague's all-time career leader in assists, and the Greek Professional Basket League's all-time career leader in points scored. He was also the 2018 Greek Cup Finals Top Scorer. In May 2018, he was named to the All-EuroLeague Second Team of the 2017–18 season, the eighth All-EuroLeague Team selection of his career, which set a record for the most All-EuroLeague Team selections of all time.

==== 2018–19 season ====
Before the start of the 2018–19 season, Spanoulis signed a one-year contract extension with Olympiacos, on 2 July 2018, at a salary of €1.2 million net income. He was named the MVP of Round 14 of the 2018–19 EuroLeague season.

During the Greek Basket League 2018–19 season, Spanoulis became the Professional Greek League's all-time career assists leader. He passed the previous record holder, Dimitris Diamantidis, in a Greek League game against AEK Athens, in January 2019. On 14 March 2019, Spanoulis suffered a season-ending peroneal tendon rupture on his right ankle, in a EuroLeague game against the Italian club Olimpia Milano.

==== 2019–20 season ====
After undergoing a 2018–19 season-ending right ankle surgery, for a peroneal tendon rupture, on 1 April 2019, Spanoulis began individual workouts again on 5 July 2019. After his return to individual training, Spanoulis signed a one-year contract extension with Olympiacos, at a salary of €600,000 net income. On 29 November 2019, Spanoulis passed Juan Carlos Navarro, to become the EuroLeague's all-time career leader in Performance Index Rating (PIR). He accomplished the milestone in a EuroLeague 2019–20 season game versus the Italian club Olimpia Milano. On 2 January 2020, Spanoulis also passed Navarro as the EuroLeague's all-time leading scorer since the 2000–01 season, in Olympiacos' loss against Fenerbahçe. His record was surpassed by Mike James in 2024.

After Spanoulis set the EuroLeague scoring record, he was congratulated via video by several well-known professional basketball players. He was congratulated by several NBA players such as Giannis Antetokounmpo, Tony Parker, Pau Gasol, and Luka Dončić. He was also congratulated by several EuroLeague players such as Georgios Printezis, Juan Carlos Navarro, Facu Campazzo, Fernando San Emeterio, Othello Hunter, Šarūnas Jasikevičius, Sergio Rodríguez, Alexey Shved, Kostas Sloukas, Stratos Perperoglou, Ante Tomić, Toko Shengelia, Vasilije Micić, Vladimir Lučić, Gustavo Ayón, Nick Calathes, Jordan Taylor, Kyle Hines, and Kostas Papanikolaou. He was also congratulated by the legendary European basketball coach Aíto.

On 4 February 2020, Spanoulis again suffered a season-ending peroneal tendon rupture injury, in a EuroLeague game against Žalgiris Kaunas. It was the same right foot injury, that he had suffered in the previous 2018–19 season. On 7 February 2020, Spanoulis had another surgery to repair the tendon.

On 12 May 2020, Spanoulis was named to the EuroLeague 2010–20 All-Decade Team. Among the 10 players voted onto the EuroLeague's All-Decade Team, Spanoulis was voted the number one overall EuroLeague Player of the 2010–2020 Decade, in a vote decided by EuroLeague head coaches, EuroLeague players, fans, and sports journalists. He received more than twice as many votes as the player who came in second place in the voting, which was Bogdan Bogdanović.

==== 2020–21 season ====
On 11 July 2020, Spanoulis re-signed with Olympiacos, to a one-year €600,000 net income contract, through the 2020–21 season. On 10 December 2020, in a game against Red Star Belgrade, Spanoulis passed Juan Carlos Navarro, to become the all-time leading scorer in the history of Europe's top-tier level basketball competition, including all the history of the competition, under both the management of both FIBA and EuroLeague Basketball, dating back to the original FIBA European Champions Cup competition, in 1958. @@@

=== Retirement from playing career and legacy ===
At the age of 38, Spanoulis announced his intention to retire from playing professional basketball, on 26 June 2021. On 27 September 2021, at the age of 39, Spanoulis held a press conference, in which he officially announced his retirement as a player. When he retired, Spanoulis finished his men's playing career with a total of 13,533 points scored in 1,234 games played, across all leagues and competitions.

In international club competitions, Spanoulis scored 24 points in 2 games played in the official World Club Championship, known as the FIBA Intercontinental Cup, and he also scored a total of 4,872 points in 403 games played in European-wide professional club competitions, which was the second most points ever scored in the history of European-wide competitions, and a mere 32 points behind the career record holder Nikos Galis' 4,904 career points. At the time of his retirement, Spanoulis stated that being able to spend more time with his family, was more important than playing until he scored another 33 points to break Galis' scoring record. Of Spanoulis' 4,872 career points scored in European-wide leagues, 4,455 points were scored in 358 games played in Europe's top-tier level competition, the EuroLeague, which was the league's all-time career scoring record, including all formats of the competition, dating back to the original FIBA European Champions Cup, which began in 1958.

Spanoulis also scored a total of 16 points in 4 games played in the 3rd-tier level FIBA Korać Cup competition, 86 points in 8 games played in the 3rd-tier level FIBA Europe Champions Cup competition, 133 points in 21 games played in the 3rd-tier level FIBA Europe League competition, and 182 points in 12 games played in the European 2nd-tier level EuroCup competition. In addition to that, he also scored a total of 5,909 points in 571 games played in national domestic leagues. Of which, 303 points were scored in 39 games played in the Greek 2nd Division, 5,517 points were scored in 500 games played in the Greek Basket League (Greek 1st Division), and 89 points were scored in 32 games played in the NBA (85 points scored in 31 regular season NBA games, and 4 points scored in 1 NBA playoff game).

Spanoulis' 5,517 points scored in the Greek Basket League is the league's all-time career scoring record. Spanoulis also scored a total of 414 points in 47 games played in the Greek Cup competition. In national team competitions, Spanoulis had a total of 211 caps (games played), in which he scored a total of 2,314 points.

After he retired from playing professional club basketball, Spanoulis was inducted into the EuroLeague's Hall of Fame, as he was named a EuroLeague Legend, on 22 April 2022.

Spanoulis' number 7 jersey was retired by Olympiacos Piraeus, on 17 September 2023, at a ceremony that was called, "The Night of the Legend".

As a result of the great success that he had with Olympiacos during his playing career, Spanoulis was voted Olympiacos Piraeus CFP's multi-sport club's Greatest of All Time (GOAT) Athlete, across all club sports and divisions, in the club's 100-year history.

"Do you understand who Vassilis Spanoulis is in Europe? He's like the Kobe [Bryant], or [Michael] Jordan of Europe."

— Giannis Antetokounmpo

"I always said, and you [Georgios Bartzokas] know of course, Vassilis Spanoulis is my favorite player of all time in Europe. I think he's the greatest player to ever play in Europe."

— Joe Arlauckas, on Vassilis Spanoulis' European basketball playing career.

"At the age of twelve to thirteen, I [Luka Dončić] got enchanted by Spanoulis." "From playing in Europe, I know he [Spanoulis] was my idol. I always admired him. That's why I wear the number seven...I couldn't get the seven, because it was taken...that's why I have 77...I just want to thank him...for everything that he brought to basketball, not just to me. I think to a lot of players, he just showed...how to play basketball, how to act on the court, what is leadership. So, that's everything."

— Luka Dončić, on his childhood idol, Vassilis Spanoulis' influence on him as a young player, and choosing to wear the number 7, to honor him.

"I feel particularly moved, because from the first day in my life that I saw Vassilis Spanoulis, I believed in him, and I saw that he had a special passion, and a different character from all the others. Later in his career, we also discovered his greatness. There was not anything that he couldn't do. It was a sensational career for European and Greek basketball, and he continued our great history since 1987. He left his mark on all of European basketball. I personally admire him for his rare character."

"I think one night [jersey retirement ceremony] is not enough. He [Vassilis Spanoulis] has done so many great things, and is a player who has made us proud, and motivated our children to get involved in the sport. He has done incredible things in his career, we thank him very much, but not only for the basketball that he played, but also for the way he persevered on the court and worked with the people around him. Vassilis has done things that are difficult for anyone to predict, although from a young age – because I was his supporter in his early days – he was a player who had passion and faith, worked hard, and he listened to advice that would help him reach higher. He didn't just reach high; he surpassed the sky. I think he is an example to follow, not only for what he did as an athlete, but also as a family man.

There are many moments, but certainly the first year we were in Maroussi, he showed that he can lead any basketball team...The least that could have been done was to retire his jersey. Kudos to the people who realized that this had to be done, for a player who started modestly, far from the center of basketball, and began to compete with the best in the world, and to make us rejoice with his successes. He never gave up. He never stopped dreaming and believing, and that was his biggest motivation. Every day that he was on the court, he gave his best, and he wanted to make his goals come true...These players [current players] need to understand that talent is not enough, and that you must understand the game, but also work hard, because without hard work, you will not achieve even 1/10 of what Vassilis did."

— Panagiotis Giannakis, on Vassilis Spanoulis' European basketball playing career.

== National team career ==
=== Greek junior national team ===
Spanoulis was a key member of the Greek under-18 junior national team at the FIBA Under-18 EuroBasket's 2000 tournament. Greece finished in third place in the tournament, winning the bronze medal. He averaged 10.1 points per game at the tournament. Spanoulis also played at the 2000 edition of the Albert Schweitzer Under-18 World Tournament, where he averaged 14.0 points per game, and won the silver medal with Greece.

Spanoulis was also on the Greek under-20 junior national team that finished in first place, and thus won the gold medal, at the 2002 FIBA Under-20 EuroBasket. During the 2002 FIBA Under-20 EuroBasket's gold medal game, Spanoulis sank two clutch free throws, with just 13 seconds remaining on the game clock. That allowed Greece to clinch the win over the Spain under-20 national team and win the tournament's gold medal. Spanoulis averaged 16.0 points per game at the tournament.

=== Greek senior national team ===
Spanoulis played with Greece at the 2001 Mediterranean Games. Spanoulis was a key member of the team for Greece during that tournament. Greece finished in second place in the tournament, winning the silver medal. Spanoulis won a gold medal with the Greek national team, at the 2006 FIBA Stanković World Cup tournament. On the way to that achievement, Greece defeated Australia, and then Germany (the latter whose team included NBA star Dirk Nowitzki).

Spanoulis was named the MVP of both the 2007 edition and the 2009 edition of the Acropolis Tournament. He was also the Top Scorer of the 2008 edition of the Acropolis Tournament and the assist leader of the 2013 edition of the Acropolis Tournament. In total, Spanoulis won eight gold medals at the Acropolis Tournament with the Greek national team, as he won the 2005, 2006, 2007, 2008, 2009, 2010, 2013, and 2015 editions of the tournament. He also won the silver medal at the 2004 edition of the Acropolis Tournament.

Spanoulis' retirement from the Greece men's national basketball team was announced on 17 September 2015, after the 2015 FIBA EuroBasket. He ended his Greece men's national basketball team career, having been the leading scorer in every major tournament that he played in, from 2006 onward (9 tournaments in total: 2006 FIBA World Cup, 2007 FIBA EuroBasket, 2008 FIBA World Olympic Qualifying Tournament, 2008 FIBA Summer Olympics, 2009 FIBA EuroBasket, 2010 FIBA World Cup, 2012 FIBA World Olympic Qualifying Tournament, 2013 FIBA EuroBasket, and the 2015 FIBA EuroBasket).

In December 2019, Greece's senior national team head coach at the time, Rick Pitino, stated that "Just for the record I would love to see Spanoulis join our national team".

In his career, Spanoulis had 146 official caps with the senior men's Greek national team, in which he scored a total of 1,494 points, for a scoring average of 10.2 points per game. In all official games played with Greece's men's national team, he had a total of 211 caps, in which he scored a total of 2,314 points, for a scoring average of 11.0 points per game. Spanoulis finished his national team career with Greece, having won a total of nine medals at all levels, seven of which came in FIBA competitions. In 2020, he was named to both the FIBA Summer Olympics 1992–2020 Dream Team, and the FIBA EuroBasket 2000–2020 Dream Team.

==== FIBA Summer Olympic Games ====
Spanoulis made his debut with the senior men's Greek national team, for the first time, in the summer of 2004, when he was selected by his then-head coach at Maroussi, Greek basketball legend, Panagiotis Giannakis, to be a member of the Greek squad during the 2004 FIBA Summer Olympics, which were held in Athens, Greece. Spanoulis was able to play in front of his home country's fans at Helliniko Olympic Arena, as Greece was the Olympic Game's host country. Greece finished in 5th place in the tournament, losing to Manu Ginóbili and the eventual gold medal-winning Argentine national basketball team, 69–64, in the quarterfinals. That was tied for the 2nd highest finish for Greece, in Summer Olympics Basketball, in its history. The 5th-place finish, making Greece one of the top 5 national teams in the world, was the beginning of Greece's great run, in international tournaments during the 2000s (decade).

Spanoulis averaged a team-leading 12.8 points per game, at the 2008 FIBA World Olympic Qualifying Tournament, where Greece finished in first place. He also played at the main 2008 FIBA Summer Olympics competition, where he led Greece in scoring average at 14.3 points per game, and at the 2012 FIBA World Olympic Qualifying Tournament, where he again led Greece in scoring, with an average of 19.3 points per game, which was the third highest scoring average in the tournament. He was named to the FIBA Summer Olympics 1992–2020 Dream Team in 2020.

"Just for the record I would love to see Spanoulis join our [Greek] national team". "I must say that I still want Spanoulis to play. Before the injury [Spanoulis' ankle injury], I thought that Spanoulis would play. I want him to be the leader, I want him to lead the team, even if he is not 100% ready. He will have time to get back on his feet. I want him to come as a leader. We will not win with athleticism, but with intelligence and the pride of playing for Greece. Spanoulis is very important to me; I want to have him with me. I will make him an offer that he can't refuse."

— Rick Pitino, on Vassilis Spanoulis playing for him on the Greek NT.

On 3 June 2021, Spanoulis returned to once again play with the senior Greek national team at the 2020 FIBA World Olympics Qualification Tournament, after a six-year hiatus from the team was announced. However, on 26 June 2021, Spanoulis announced his retirement from the sport for good, after he suffered an injury during Greece's training camp preparation.

==== FIBA EuroBasket ====
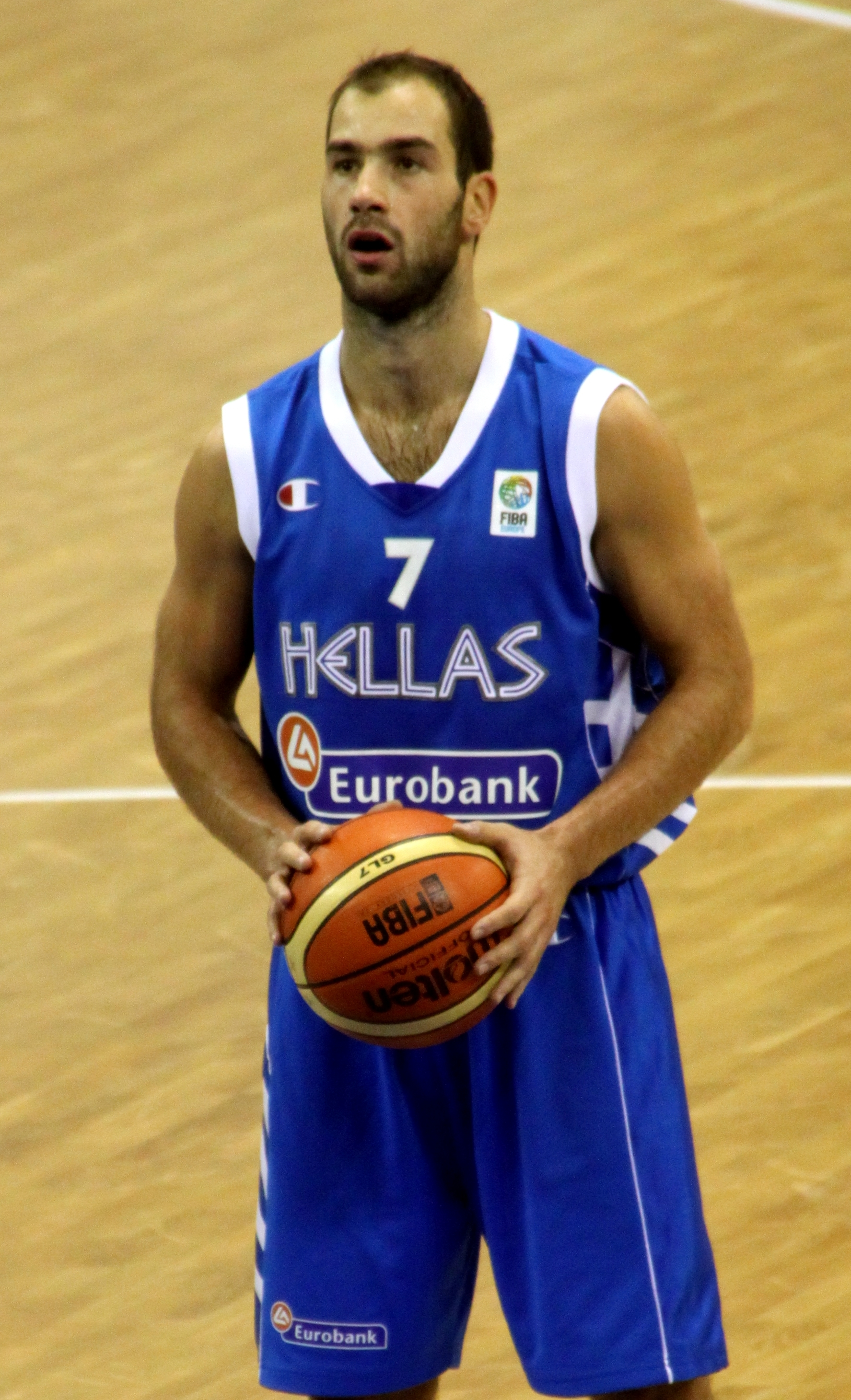
Spanoulis, in action with the Greek national team, at the 2009 FIBA EuroBasket.

At the 2005 FIBA EuroBasket, Spanoulis was a key member of the Greek team that won the FIBA EuroBasket and took home the gold medal. It was just the second time in Greece's history, that the senior men's national basketball team won the gold medal at the FIBA EuroBasket, and the first time since the 1987 FIBA EuroBasket, when the legendary players Nikos Galis, Panagiotis Fasoulas, Fanis Christodoulou, and Panagiotis Giannakis, led Greece's national team.

Two years later, at the 2007 FIBA EuroBasket, Spanoulis was again part of Greece's team. Greece played the tournament shorthanded, as it was without key players, Antonis Fotsis and Sofoklis Schortsanitis, and was not able to medal in the tournament. Greece finished in 4th place in the tournament, losing in the semifinals game against the Spain basketball team, and its numerous star players, like Marc Gasol, Juan Carlos Navarro, José Calderón, Sergio Rodríguez, Jorge Garbajosa, Rudy Fernández, and Pau Gasol. Spanoulis was the game's leading scorer, with 24 points, and he also dished out 5 assists, but Spain got the win, by a score of 82–77, over the depleted Greek squad. Spanoulis led the Greek team in scoring during the tournament, with a scoring average of 11.7 points per game. He also had the top highlight play of the tournament, with a buzzer-beating 3-pointer to win the game for Greece against Croatia, by a score of 81–78. Spanoulis' 2007 game-winning shot against Croatia, is widely considered to be the greatest game-winning shot in the history of the FIBA EuroBasket tournament and is also widely considered to be one of the greatest game-winning shots ever in any FIBA tournament.

At the 2009 FIBA EuroBasket, Spanoulis led Greece in scoring, with an average of 14.1 points per game, and led Greece to the bronze medal. He was named to the FIBA EuroBasket All-Star Five. At the 2013 FIBA EuroBasket, despite playing most of the tournament with a severe ankle injury, Spanoulis led Greece in scoring, and was third overall in the tournament in scoring, averaging 16.7 points per game. During the tournament, he led Greece with a 20-point scoring performance, to a 79–75 victory over the world's 2nd-ranked team in the FIBA World Rankings at the time, Spain. At the 2015 FIBA EuroBasket, Spanoulis led the Greek team, which had four players who had spent the 2014–15 season in the NBA (Giannis Antetokounmpo, Kosta Koufos, Nick Calathes, and Kostas Papanikolaou) in points per game and assists per game. Greece was ultimately defeated in the quarterfinals by Spain, by a score of 73–71, and finished the tournament in 5th place. After the tournament, Spanoulis announced his retirement from the Greek senior national team. He was Greece's leading scorer in every major FIBA tournament that he played in, from 2006 onward. He was named to the FIBA EuroBasket 2000–2020 Dream Team in 2020.

==== FIBA World Cup ====
Spanoulis was a member of the Greek senior team that competed at the 2006 FIBA World Cup, and he helped to lead the Greek team to the silver medal, as they finished in second place in the tournament. In the semifinals game against Team USA, Spanoulis was Greece's leading scorer, and the game's second-leading scorer overall (after Carmelo Anthony, who scored 27 points for the USA), with 22 points, and along with his teammates, Theo Papaloukas and Sofoklis Schortsanitis, led Greece to victory over the US, by a score of 101–95. Team USA's head coach at the time, Mike Krzyzewski, later stated that, "I know that from 2006. That's a lesson we learned that the Greek team taught us, how to play internationally."

Spanoulis led the Greek national team in scoring during the 2006 FIBA World Cup, with an average of 11.7 points per game, and he also led the Greek team in free throw shooting percentage at 87.8 percent.

"...I know that from 2006 [FIBA World Cup]. That's a lesson we [Team USA] learned that the Greek team taught us, how to play internationally."

— Mike Krzyzewski, on Team USA's loss to Vassilis Spanoulis and the Greek NT, at the 2006 FIBA World Cup.

Spanoulis also played with Greece at the 2010 FIBA World Cup, where he averaged 13.7 points per game, which made him Greece's leading scorer in the tournament.

== Coaching career ==
=== EuroLeague under-18 Next Generation Select team ===
After he retired from playing professional club basketball, Spanoulis began a new career, working as a basketball coach, in 2021. He began his coaching career, working as the head coach of the EuroLeague under-18 Next Generation Select team. Spanoulis led the under-18 Next Generation Select team to the EuroLeague under-18 Next Generation tournament's 2021–22 season finals, where they lost to Mega Basket's Under-18 team, by a score of 82–61.

=== Peristeri Athens ===
==== 2022–23 season ====
On 24 June 2022, Spanoulis was officially announced as the new head coach of the Greek Basket League and FIBA Champions League club Peristeri Athens. In his first season as Peristeri's head coach, Spanoulis led the club to its first-ever finals appearance in the Greek Cup competition, as they made it to the title game of the Greek Cup 2022–23. However, they lost in the finals to the EuroLeague club Olympiacos Piraeus.

In the Greek Basket League's 2022–23 season, Spanoulis led the team to a third-place overall finish in the league. In the league's playoffs, Peristeri defeated the FIBA Champions League club AEK Athens, with a 2–0 sweep in their first round best-of-three series. They then proceeded to lose 3–2 in their best-of-five semifinals series against the EuroLeague club Panathinaikos Athens. Peristeri then finished their season by sweeping the FIBA Champions League club PAOK Thessaloniki 3–0, in the league's third-place series. During the entire Greek Basket League season (regular season and playoffs), Peristeri managed to beat the Greek EuroLeague club Panathinaikos, three times in seven games, with one of their four losses against Panathinaikos coming by just one point.

In European-wide competition, Peristeri was eliminated by the French Pro A League club JDA Dijon, by a series score of 2–1, in the play-ins of the FIBA Champions League 2022–23 season.

==== 2023–24 season ====
In the 2023 edition of the Greek Super Cup competition, Peristeri was eliminated by the Greek EuroLeague club Olympiacos Piraeus, in the semifinals, by a score of 84–64. In the 2023–24 edition of the Greek Cup competition, Peristeri was once again eliminated by Olympiacos, as they lost in the quarterfinals, by a score of 87–68.

In the 2023–24 FIBA Champions League season, Peristeri qualified for the 2024 FIBA Champions League Final Four. In the semifinals, Peristeri was knocked out of the Final Four tournament, after a 97–94 defeat to the Spanish ACB League club Tenerife. Ultimately, Peristeri finished in fourth place in the FIBA Champions League season, after they lost the bronze medal game against the Spanish ACB League club UCAM Murcia, by a score of 87–84. Spanoulis was named the FIBA Champions League's Best Coach of the Season.

"To play against him [Spanoulis], and then understand that as a coach, he has the same attention to details...his name is Kill Bill for a reason, and he has the same mentality as a coach. He holds everybody accountable, he holds himself accountable. The amount of information you can get from him, from just a two-minute conversation, it's unbelievable. I've never seen it before. He can be walking next to you, and in those two minutes, you're getting so much energy, and so much knowledge, in two minutes."

— Jermaine Love, on Vassilis Spanoulis' basketball knowledge and coaching ability.

=== AS Monaco ===
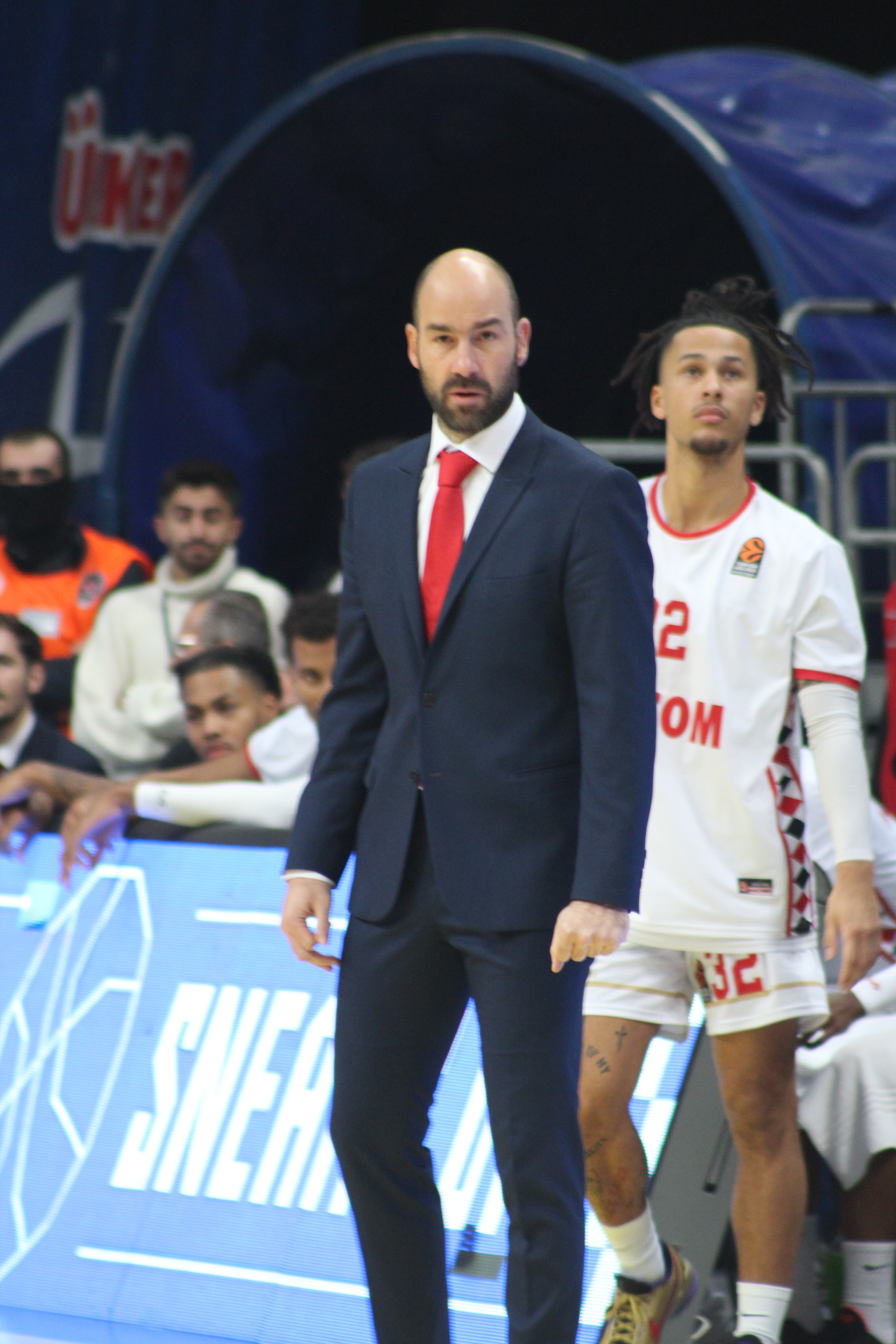
Spanoulis (wearing the suit and tie), while coaching AS Monaco, in 2024.

On 27 November 2024, AS Monaco, of France's top-tier level LNB Pro A and the EuroLeague, signed Spanoulis to be their new head coach, on a two-year contract. In his very first season as the club's head coach, Spanoulis led Monaco to the 2025 EuroLeague Final Four, by eliminating Barcelona with a 3–2 series win in the playoffs of the EuroLeague 2024–25 season. In the Final Four, Monaco defeated Olympiacos in the semifinals but lost in the final to Fenerbahçe Beko. In the French Championship, Monaco lost the title to Paris in the fifth game of the series.

Spanoulis stepped down as Monaco coach in the middle of the 2025–2026 season, after a series of financial problems affecting the club and reported conflicts within the team.

=== Greek national team ===
Spanoulis was named the head coach of the senior men's Greek national team, on 2 October 2023. He made his head coaching debut with Greece, on 23 February 2024, in which he guided Greece to a 72–64 win over the Czech Republic, in Piraeus, Athens, as part of the 2025 FIBA EuroBasket Qualification. Spanoulis next coached Greece at the 2024 Piraeus FIBA Olympic Qualifying Tournament, before the 2024 FIBA Summer Olympics.

"Certainly, coach [Dimitris] Itoudis is an excellent coach, and the collaboration we had was tremendous. I wish I could have been at the Worlds [2019 FIBA World Cup] with him, because he was a terrific coach. But Spanoulis coming to the national team, someone who has won with the national team, and all of the players respect him – is something different. I don't believe that any player on the national team didn't have him as a role model." "I think this is what the national team needs. A person with many unbelievable moments for Greek basketball, from playing for the national team, to Panathinaikos and Olympiacos. He has tremendous experience as a player. As a coach, over the last two years, he showed what he can do."

— Giannis Antetokounmpo, on Vassilis Spanoulis coaching the Greek NT.

Under Spanoulis' leadership, the Greek national team won the 2024 Piraeus FIBA Olympic Qualifying Tournament and thus qualified for the main 2024 Summer Olympic Games basketball tournament. At the 2024 Summer Olympics, Greece managed to qualify through the tournament's Death Group, which also consisted of Australia, Spain, and Canada, and make it to the quarterfinals. In the quarterfinals, they were eliminated by the 2023 FIBA World Cup champions Germany, by a score of 76–63.

=== Aris Thessaloniki ===
After his departure from Monaco as a free agent manager in the middle of 2025, rumours from all around Europe started spreading for many teams following his coaching career. Aris Thessaloniki proved to be the next team, where on June 3, 2026, Aris announced him as their new head coach with annual earnings of 1.33 million Euros for 3 years.

== Personal life ==
Spanoulis' older brother, Dimitris, is a former professional basketball player. Spanoulis is married to Miss Star Hellas of 2006, Olympia Chopsonidou. Together, the couple have six children: Thanasis, Vassilis Jr., Dimitris, Emilia, Anastasia and Alexandra.

Spanoulis' basketball idols, and favorite players as a kid, were Michael Jordan and Nikos Galis. During his playing career, Spanoulis is often referred to by the nicknames V-Span and Kill Bill. When Spanoulis played with Maroussi Athens, he was given the nickname Bill the Butcher, by Tracy Murray, who was at that time a player of Maroussi's rivals, Panathinaikos Athens.

Spanoulis was the first Greek-born player to play for the Houston Rockets, and he was the third Greek-born player to play in the NBA. While he was with the Houston Rockets, Spanoulis was friends with his teammates: Lucas, Tsakalidis, Battier, McGrady, and Novak. Over his playing career in Europe, some of the basketball players that he has been friends with have included: Batiste, Parker, Arroyo, Jasikevičius, Teodosić, Nesterović, Blakney, Calathes, Bourousis, Diamantidis, Papaloukas, Printezis, Vasilopoulos, James, Larkin, Mantzaris, Papapetrou, Sloukas, Papanikolaou, Agravanis, Perperoglou, Vezenkov, Milutinov, Tomić, Antić, Vukčević, Hines, Hunter, McKissic, along with numerous other teammates that he is also good friends with from his basketball playing career. Over the years, he has been best friends with Nikos Zisis, and he was the best man at Zisis' wedding.

== Club career statistics ==
Legend
GP	Games played	GS	Games started	MPG	Minutes per game
FG%	Field-goal percentage	3P%	3-point field-goal percentage	FT%	Free-throw percentage
RPG	Rebounds per game	APG	Assists per game	SPG	Steals per game
BPG	Blocks per game	PPG	Points per game	PIR	Performance index rating
**Bold**	Career high

=== EuroLeague ===
†	Denotes season in which Spanoulis won the EuroLeague championship
*	Led the league

Year	Team	GP	GS	MPG	FG%	3P%	FT%	RPG	APG	SPG	BPG	PPG	PIR
2005–06	Panathinaikos	23	3	27.8	**.534**	.368	.780	2.0	3.1	**1.4**	—	14.6	15.5
2007–08	Panathinaikos	20	5	27.8	.444	.355	.750	**2.6**	2.7	1.3	—	11.3	11.1
2008–09†	Panathinaikos	19	9	25.6	.413	.309	**.879**	2.4	3.5	1.2	—	10.5	11.4
2009–10	Panathinaikos	14	6	25.3	.398	.277	.845	1.5	3.6	1.1	—	10.3	9.7
2010–11	Olympiacos	20	17	29.5	.444	.347	.852	1.8	4.3	1.1	.1	14.2	14.3
2011–12†	Olympiacos	21	19	29.8	.479	**.386**	.827	2.0	4.0	.7	**.1**	**16.7**	**16.0**
2012–13†	Olympiacos	31*	31*	**30.0**	.397	.321	.782	2.2	5.5	.9	.0	14.7	15.1
2013–14	Olympiacos	26	26	28.1	.430	.344	.738	2.0	4.6	.4	—	15.1	13.0
2014–15	Olympiacos	26	26	28.1	.396	.333	.759	1.8	5.5	.8	**.1**	14.4	14.4
2015–16	Olympiacos	20	20	26.9	.318	.260	.706	1.5	5.4	.4	—	11.2	8.6
2016–17	Olympiacos	33	**32**	26.8	.396	.315	.759	1.7	**6.1**	.6	—	12.6	11.9
2017–18	Olympiacos	24	24	26.3	.396	.315	.817	1.5	5.6	.7	—	14.0	11.9
2018–19	Olympiacos	25	14	22.1	.382	.331	.712	1.8	5.1	.4	.0	10.2	9.0
2019–20	Olympiacos	22	20	24.6	.410	.286	.807	1.2	4.6	.4	—	11.3	9.7
2020–21	Olympiacos	**34**	2	17.3	.355	.283	.644	1.5	2.7	.6	—	6.4	4.7
**Career**		358	254	26.2	.412	.321	.779	1.8	4.5	.8	.0	12.4	11.7

=== Domestic leagues ===
==== Regular season & Playoffs ====
†	Denotes season in which Spanoulis won the Greek Basketball League championship
*	Led the league in the regular season
**	Led the league in the full season (regular season and playoffs combined)

Season	Team	League	GP	MPG	FG%	3P%	FT%	RPG	APG	SPG	BPG	PPG
2001–02	(Greece) Maroussi	HEBA A1	16	13	.606	.166	.650	.3	.9	.3	.0	4.9
2002–03	(Greece) Maroussi	HEBA A1	29	29.5	.496	.278	.750	1.4	3.3	**1.5**	.0	10.3
2003–04	(Greece) Maroussi	HEBA A1	33	28.3	.534	.361	.827	2.2	2.8	.8	.0	11.1
2004–05	(Greece) Maroussi	HEBA A1	35	**30.9***	.459	.377	.825	2.1	3.9*	1.4	.0	**15.9****
2005–06†	(Greece) Panathinaikos	HEBA A1	34	27.7	.519	.367	.779	1.8	3.5	1.0	.0	11.0
2007–08†	(Greece) Panathinaikos	HEBA A1	**36**	26.4	.570	.393	.803	1.7	**4.3***	1.1	.0	12.1
2008–09†	(Greece) Panathinaikos	HEBA A1	30	23.7	.481	.405	.830	2.0	2.8	.7	.0	10.1
2009–10†	(Greece) Panathinaikos	HEBA A1	31	21.1	**.708**	.433	.795	1.3	2.5	.6	.0	10.1
2010–11	(Greece) Olympiacos	HEBA A1	30	23.5	.515	.300	.784	1.4	5.1	.7	.0	10.6
2011–12†	(Greece) Olympiacos	HEBA A1	31	23.4	.475	.336	.815	2.1	**5.0***	.8	.0	11.7
2012–13	(Greece) Olympiacos	GBL	33	24.5	.487	.295	.743	1.5	**5.7***	.8	.0	11.3
2013–14	(Greece) Olympiacos	GBL	29	21.4	.441	.294	.745	2.0	4.8	.6	.0	9.4
2014–15†	(Greece) Olympiacos	GBL	31	23.5	.525	.375	.747	1.7	**5.6***	.5	.0	12.5
2015–16†	(Greece) Olympiacos	GBL	29	25.0	.459	.333	.822	1.5	5.4	.6	.0	13.1
2016–17	(Greece) Olympiacos	GBL	25	22.2	.442	.205	.802	1.5	**5.7**	.5	.0	8.4
2017–18	(Greece) Olympiacos	GBL	28	23.0	.487	.261	.821	1.6	5.3	.4	.0	10.8
2018–19	(Greece) Olympiacos	GBL	15	20.6	.518	.306	.642	**2.5**	4.8	.7	.0	9.5
2020–21	(Greece) Olympiacos	GBL	3	16.3	.571	**.462**	**.857**	.7	4.3	1.0	.0	10.7
**Career**			499	23.6	.504	.330	.792	1.7	4.3	.8	.0	11.0

=== NBA ===
==== Regular season ====
Year	Team	GP	GS	MPG	FG%	3P%	FT%	RPG	APG	SPG	BPG	PPG
2006–07	Houston	31	0	8.8	.319	.172	.810	.7	.9	.2	.0	2.7
**Career**		31	0	8.8	.319	.172	.810	.7	.9	.2	.0	2.7

==== Playoffs ====
Year	Team	GP	GS	MPG	FG%	3P%	FT%	RPG	APG	SPG	BPG	PPG
2007	Houston	1	0	3.0	.500	.000	1.000	1.0	1.0	.0	.0	4.0
**Career**		1	0	3.0	.500	.000	1.000	1.0	1.0	.0	.0	4.0

== Greece national team career statistics ==
*	Denotes tournaments in which Spanoulis won a Gold medal (first place)
**	Denotes tournaments in which Spanoulis won a Silver medal (second place)
***	Denotes tournaments in which Spanoulis won a Bronze medal (third place)

Year	Tournament	National Team	GP	GS	MPG	FG%	3P%	FT%	RPG	APG	SPG	BPG	PPG
2001	Mediterranean Games	Greece Men	4	–	–	–	–	–	–	–	–	–	8.0
2004	Summer Olympics	Greece Men	6	N/A	11.0	.444	.500	.750	0.7	1.0	.3	.0	3.8
2005	EuroBasket	Greece Men	7	0	10.3	.227	.100	.600	1.1	0.3	.3	.0	2.4
2006	Stanković World Cup	Greece Men	3	N/A	23.0	.429	.444	.706	2.7	1.7	2.3	.0	9.3
2006	World Cup	Greece Men	9	N/A	27.2	.358	.262	.878	1.8	1.3	1.2	.0	11.7
2007	EuroBasket	Greece Men	9	0	26.1	.418	.303	.576	1.8	2.0	1.1	.0	11.7
2008	World OQT	Greece Men	4	N/A	24.0	.474	.400	.900	2.5	3.8	2.8	.0	12.8
2008	Summer Olympics	Greece Men	6	N/A	28.2	.531	.273	.632	3.0	3.0	1.3	.0	14.3
2009	EuroBasket	Greece Men	9	8	31.3	.458	.436	.829	2.7	4.2	1.4	.1	14.1
2010	World Cup	Greece Men	6	6	29.3	.520	.419	.810	1.0	2.3	1.2	.0	13.7
2012	World OQT	Greece Men	3	2	26.3	.613	.500	.619	2.7	5.7	0.3	.0	19.3
2013	EuroBasket	Greece Men	6	6	30.2	.439	.303	.780	3.3	2.5	0.7	.2	16.7
2015	EuroBasket	Greece Men	7	7	27.6	.411	.385	.727	2.3	5.3	0.3	.1	11.4
Career			79	N/A	24.9	.445	.351	.746	2.1	2.6	1.1	.0	11.3

=== Youth National Team ===
Year	Tournament	National Team	GP	GS	MPG	FG%	3P%	FT%	RPG	APG	SPG	BPG	PPG
2000	U18 World Cup	Greece Under-18	7	N/A	–	–	–	–	–	–	–	–	14.0
2000	U18 EuroBasket	Greece Under-18	8	N/A	25.9	.579	.286	.786	1.1	1.9	.5	.0	10.1
2002	U20 EuroBasket; Qualifying	Greece Under-20	5	N/A	29.2	.545	.304	.533	3.4	4.4	1.4	.0	15.0
2002	U20 EuroBasket	Greece Under-20	8	N/A	31.3	.467	.477	.875	3.1	5.5	.9	.0	16.0
Career			28	N/A	28.7	.520	.395	.755	2.5	3.9	.9	.0	13.7

== Awards and accomplishments as a player ==
=== Pro club team accomplishments ===
==== Worldwide club competitions ====
- FIBA Intercontinental Cup Champion (Olympiacos Piraeus): 2013

==== European club competitions ====
- 3× EuroLeague Champion: 2009, 2012, 2013
  - Panathinaikos Athens: 2009
  - 2× Olympiacos Piraeus: 2012, 2013
- 5× EuroLeague Finalist: 2009, 2012, 2013, 2015, 2017
  - Panathinaikos Athens: 2009
  - 4× Olympiacos Piraeus: 2012, 2013, 2015, 2017
- 2× EuroLeague Runner-up: 2015, 2017
  - 2× Olympiacos Piraeus: 2015, 2017
- European Triple Crown Winner (Panathinaikos Athens): 2009
- FIBA Europe League Finalist (Maroussi Athens): 2004

==== Domestic league club competitions ====
- 7× Greek League Champion: 2006, 2008, 2009, 2010, 2012, 2015, 2016
  - 4× Panathinaikos Athens: 2006, 2008, 2009, 2010
  - 3× Olympiacos Piraeus: 2012, 2015, 2016
- 6× Greek League Finalist: 2004, 2011, 2013, 2014, 2017, 2018
  - Maroussi Athens: 2004
  - 5× Olympiacos Piraeus: 2011, 2013, 2014, 2017, 2018
- 4× Greek Cup Winner: 2006, 2008, 2009, 2011
  - 3× Panathinaikos Athens: 2006, 2008, 2009
  - Olympiacos Piraeus: 2011
- 5× Greek Cup Finalist: 2002, 2010, 2012, 2013, 2018
  - Maroussi Athens: 2002
  - Panathinaikos Athens: 2010
  - 3× Olympiacos Piraeus: 2012, 2013, 2018

=== National team accomplishments ===
==== Junior national team career ====
- 2000 FIBA Under-18 EuroBasket: Bronze
- 2000 AST Under-18 World Tournament: Silver
- 2002 FIBA Under-20 EuroBasket: Gold

==== Senior national team career ====
- 2001 Mediterranean Games: Silver
- 2004 Acropolis Tournament: Silver
- 2005 Acropolis Tournament: Gold
- 2005 FIBA EuroBasket: Gold
- 2006 Acropolis Tournament: Gold
- 2006 FIBA Stanković World Cup: Gold
- 2006 FIBA World Cup: Silver
- 2007 Acropolis Tournament: Gold
- 2008 Acropolis Tournament: Gold
- 2008 FIBA World OQT: Gold
- 2009 Acropolis Tournament: Gold
- 2009 FIBA EuroBasket: Bronze
- 2010 Acropolis Tournament: Gold
- 2013 Acropolis Tournament: Gold
- 2015 Acropolis Tournament: Gold

=== Youth club career ===
- Panhellenic Youth Championship Champion: 1999

=== Individual awards and accomplishments ===
==== Worldwide awards and accomplishments ====
- FIBA Intercontinental Cup MVP: 2013
- International Sports Prize's World Athlete of the Year: 2013
- HoopsHype's 75 Greatest International Players Ever: 2021

==== European awards and accomplishments ====
- EuroLeague 25th Anniversary Team: 2025
- 101 Greats of European Basketball: 2018
- EuroLeague MVP: 2013
- 3× EuroLeague Final Four MVP: 2009, 2012, 2013
- 3× EuroLeague Final Four Top Scorer: 2009, 2012, 2013
- EuroLeague Championship Game Top Scorer: 2013
- 3× EuroLeague MVP of the Month:
  - February 2012, November 2012, October 2014
- 8× EuroLeague MVP of the Round:
  - 2006 (2× – Regular Season Round 2 and Playoffs Games 1 and 2), 2014 (2× – Regular Season Round 8 and Top 16 Round 1), 2017 (2× - Regular Season Round 2 and Playoffs Game 5), 2018 (Regular Season Round 23), 2019 (Regular Season Round 14)
- 8× All-EuroLeague Team: 2006, 2009, 2011, 2012, 2013, 2014, 2015, 2018
- 2× EuroLeague total points leader: 2012, 2013
- 2× EuroLeague total assists leader: 2013, 2017
- 2nd in Points Per Game in EuroLeague: 2012
- 2× 3rd in Points Per Game in EuroLeague: 2011, 2014
- 2nd in Assists Per Game in EuroLeague: 2017
- 3rd in Assists Per Game in EuroLeague: 2013
- Named the Most Clutch Player in EuroLeague History: 2017
- EuroLeague's Best Captain: 2018
- Voted the Best EuroLeague Player of The 2010s Decade by Eurohoops.net: 2020
- EuroLeague 2010–2020 All-Decade Team: (2020)
- EuroLeague 2010–2020 Player of the Decade: 2020
- EuroLeague Hall of Fame: 2022
- Voted the EuroLeague's "GOAT" ("Greatest of All Time") player, in a BasketNews.com poll of EuroLeague players: 2023
- EuroCup Rookie of the Year: 2005
- EuroCup Sixth Man of the Year: 2005
- Balkan Athlete of the Year: 2009
- 3× Eurobasket News All-EuroLeague Guard of the Year: 2012, 2013, 2015
- Eurobasket News All-Europeans Guard of the Year: 2013
- Eurobasket News All-Europeans First Team: 2013
- 2× Eurobasket News All-Europeans Second Team: 2009, 2012
- 2× Eurobasket News All-Europe Player of the Year: 2012, 2013
- 3× Eurobasket News All-Europe Guard of the Year: 2009, 2012, 2013
- 3× Eurobasket News All-Europe First Team: 2009, 2012, 2013
- Eurobasket News All-Europe Second Team: 2011

==== Domestic awards and accomplishments ====
- 4× Greek League MVP: 2005, 2009, 2012, 2016
- 3× Greek League Finals MVP: 2006, 2008, 2016
- 2× Greek League Most Popular Player: 2015, 2017
- Greek League Best Young Player: 2003
- Greek League Most Improved Player: 2004
- 10× Greek League All-Star: 2005, 2006, 2008, 2009, 2010, 2011, 2013, 2014, 2018, 2019
- 12× All-Greek League Team: 2005, 2006, 2008, 2009, 2011, 2012, 2013, 2015, 2016, 2017, 2018, 2019
- 4× Eurobasket News Greek League Domestic Player of the Year: 2006, 2009, 2013, 2016
- 3× Eurobasket News All-Greek League Guard of the Year: 2009, 2012, 2016
- 12× Eurobasket News All-Greek League Domestic Team: 2005, 2006, 2008, 2009, 2011, 2012, 2013, 2014, 2015, 2016, 2017, 2018
- Greek Cup Finals Top Scorer: 2018
- 4× Greek League Assists Leader (Regular Season): 2008, 2012, 2013, 2015
- Greek League Full Season Top Scorer (Regular Season + Playoffs): 2005
- 4× Greek League Full Season Assists Leader (Regular Season + Playoffs): 2005, 2008, 2012, 2013
- Professional Greek League's All-Time Career Scoring Leader
- Professional Greek League's All-Time Career Assists Leader
- Greek League Hall of Fame: 2022

==== Club team awards and accomplishments ====
- Olympiacos Piraeus' All-Time EuroLeague Assists Leader
- 2nd in points scored with Olympiacos Piraeus' in EuroLeague, behind Sasha Vezenkov
- Olympiacos Piraeus' All-Time Greek League Assists Leader
- Olympiacos Piraeus' 2010–2020 Team of the Decade
- Olympiacos Piraeus Club Legend: 2023
- #7 jersey retired by Olympiacos: 2023
- The Greatest of All Time (GOAT) Athlete in the history of the multi-sports club Olympiacos Piraeus CFP: 2025

==== National team awards and accomplishments ====
- FIBA EuroStar: 2007
- FIBA EuroBasket All-Star Five: 2009
- FIBA Summer Olympics 1992–2020 Dream Team: 2020
- FIBA EuroBasket 2000–2020 Greek Dream Team: 2020
- FIBA EuroBasket 2000–2020 Dream Team: 2020
- 2× Acropolis Tournament MVP: 2007, 2009
- Acropolis Tournament Top Scorer: 2008
- Acropolis Tournament assist leader: 2013

==== Youth club awards and accomplishments ====
- Panhellenic Youth Championship Top Scorer: 1999
- Panhellenic Youth Championship MVP: 1999

== Individual and team awards and accomplishments as a head coach ==
=== Youth clubs ===
EuroLeague under-18 Next Generation Select team:

- EuroLeague Under-18 Next Generation tournament finalist: 2022

=== Other honors ===
- Greek Cup Finalist: 2023 (with Peristeri Athens)
- FIBA Champions League Final Four Participation: 2024 (with Peristeri Athens)
- Leaders Cup Winner: 2026 (with AS Monaco), Finalist 2025 (with AS Monaco)
- EuroLeague Finals Finalist: 2025 (with AS Monaco)
- EuroLeague Final Four Participation: 2025 (with AS Monaco)

=== National teams ===
- 2024 Acropolis Tournament: Gold (with Greece)
- 2024 Piraeus FIBA Olympic Qualifying Tournament: Gold (with Greece)
- EuroBasket 2025: Bronze (with Greece)

=== Individual awards and accomplishments ===
- FIBA Champions League Coach of the Year: 2024
