= 2007 Acropolis International Basketball Tournament =

Tournament details
- Arena: OAKA Olympic Indoor Hall; Athens, Greece
- Dates: August 20–22

Final positions
- Champions: Greece (12th title)
- Runners-up: Lithuania
- Third place: Slovenia
- Fourth place: Italy

Awards and statistics
- MVP: (Greece) Vassilis Spanoulis
- Top scorer(s): (Lithuania) Ramūnas Šiškauskas (14.3 points per game)

The Acropolis International Tournament 2007 was a basketball tournament held in OAKA Indoor Hall in Athens, Greece, from August 20 until August 22, 2007. This was the 21st edition of the Acropolis International Basketball Tournament. The four participating teams were Greece, Lithuania, Slovenia and Italy.

== Venues ==
Athens	Greece
Marousi, Athens	2007 Acropolis International Basketball Tournament is located in Greece
Olympic Indoor Hall; Capacity: 18,989	2007 Acropolis International Basketball Tournament is located in Greece

== Participating teams ==
- Greece
- Italy
- Lithuania
- Slovenia

== Standings ==
Team	Pld	W	L	PF	PA	PD	Pts
Greece	3	3	0	230	198	+32	6
Lithuania	3	2	1	244	220	+24	5
Slovenia	3	1	2	221	248	−27	4
Italy	3	0	3	213	242	−29	3

== Results ==
All times are local Central European Summer Time (UTC+2).

August 20
19:00

Italy	81–84	Slovenia
Scoring by quarter: 20–19, 16–22, 18–28, 27–15

O.A.C.A. Olympic Hall, Marousi, Athens

August 20
21:45

Greece	78–71	Lithuania
Scoring by quarter: 18–15, 18–17, 17–25, 25–14

O.A.C.A. Olympic Hall, Marousi, Athens

August 21
19:00

Slovenia	72–87	Lithuania
Scoring by quarter: 14–24, 17–27, 22–24, 19–12

O.A.C.A. Olympic Hall, Marousi, Athens

August 21
21:45

Greece	72–62	Italy
Scoring by quarter: 17–11, 22–13, 15–15, 18–23

O.A.C.A. Olympic Hall, Marousi, Athens

August 22
19:00

Greece	80–65	Slovenia
Scoring by quarter: 16–19, 24–22, 25–13, 15–11

O.A.C.A. Olympic Hall, Marousi, Athens

August 22
21:45

Italy	70–86	Lithuania
Scoring by quarter: 20–25, 17–16, 9–29, 24–16

O.A.C.A. Olympic Hall, Marousi, Athens

== Final standing ==
Rank	Team
1st place, gold medalist(s)	Greece
2nd place, silver medalist(s)	Lithuania
3rd place, bronze medalist(s)	Slovenia
4	Italy

2007 Acropolis International Basketball winners

Greece
12th title

Most Valuable Player
Vassilis Spanoulis
