= 2013 Euroleague Final Four =

Basketball tournament

- Season: 2012–13 Euroleague

Tournament details
- Arena: O2 Arena; London, England
- Dates: May 10, 2013 – May 12, 2013

Final positions
- Champions: (Greece) Olympiacos (3rd title)
- Runners-up: (Spain) Real Madrid
- Third place: (Russia) CSKA Moscow
- Fourth place: (Spain) FC Barcelona

Awards and statistics
- MVP: (Greece) Vassilis Spanoulis
- Top scorer(s): (Greece) Vassilis Spanoulis, 30
- Attendance: 48,341 (total)

The 2013 Euroleague Final Four was the concluding Final Four tournament of the 2012–13 Euroleague season. It was held from 10 May till 12 May 2013, at The O2 Arena in London. The Greek League club Olympiacos, successfully defended their EuroLeague title from the previous season, after defeating Real Madrid in the Final.

Vassilis Spanoulis won his second consecutive Final Four MVP, and the third of his career. Spanoulis joined Toni Kukoč, as the only player to have ever won the award three times.

== Venue ==
On May 12, 2012, it was announced that the Final Four would be hosted at The O2 Arena in London, England. The O2 Arena is a multi-purpose indoor arena that is located in the centre of The O2 entertainment complex, on the Greenwich Peninsula, in south-east London. It is named after its primary sponsor, the telecommunications company O2.

The O2 Arena is the world's largest building as measured by floor space, and has the second-highest seating capacity of any indoor venue in the United Kingdom, behind the Manchester Arena, but it took the crown of the world's busiest music arena from New York City's Madison Square Garden in 2008. The closest underground station to the venue is the North Greenwich station, on the Jubilee line.

London	2013 Euroleague Final Four (Europe)
The O2 Arena	2013 Euroleague Final Four (Europe)
Capacity: 20,000	2013 Euroleague Final Four (Europe)

== Bracket ==
Semifinals; 10 May
(Russia) CSKA Moscow	52
(Greece) Olympiacos	69
(Spain) FC Barcelona Regal	67
(Spain) Real Madrid	74

Final; 12 May
(Greece) Olympiacos	100
(Spain) Real Madrid	88
Third place
(Russia) CSKA Moscow	74
(Spain) FC Barcelona Regal	73

== Semifinals ==
=== CSKA Moscow vs. Olympiacos ===
10 May 2013	CSKA Moscow (Russia)	52–69	(Greece) Olympiacos	The O2 Arena, London
18:00 CEST	Scoring by quarter: 17–24, 11-16, 8-13, 16-16
	Pts: Weems 13; Rebs: Kaun 7 Asts: Erceg, Khryapa 2	Boxscore	Pts: Hines, Antić 13; Rebs: Hines 10; Asts: Spanoulis 4	Attendance: 9,218; Referees: Guerrino Cerebuch (ITA), Borys Ryzhyk (UKR), Olegs Latisevs (LAT)

=== FC Barcelona Regal vs. Real Madrid ===
10 May 2013	FC Barcelona Regal (Spain)	67–74	(Spain) Real Madrid	The O2 Arena, London
21:00 CEST	Scoring by quarter: 18-11, 15-28, 18-9, 16-26
	Pts: Huertas 19; Rebs: Tomić 12; Asts: Wallace 3	Boxscore	Pts: Reyes 17; Rebs: Carroll 6 Asts: Rodríguez 9	Attendance: 13,193; Referees: Luigi Lamonica (ITA), Ilija Belosevic (SRB), Elias Koromilas (GRE)

== Third–place game ==
12 May 2013	CSKA Moscow (Russia)	74–73	(Spain) FC Barcelona Regal	The O2 Arena, London
18:00 CEST	Scoring by quarter: 15-12, 20-23, 24-19, 15-19
	Pts: Khryapa 16; Rebs: Teodosić, Vorontsevich 5 Asts: Teodosić 5	Boxscore	Pts: Navarro 17; Rebs: Tomić 6 Asts: Jasikevičius 6	Attendance: 10,716; Referees: Robert Lottermoser (GER), Matej Boltauzer (SLO), Elias Koromilas (GRE)

== Final ==
After the end of the opening quarter, Madrid led Olympiacos by 17 points. However, the Reds managed to get back in the game, and the game was tied by the end of the third quarter. Behind Spanoulis, Olympiacos pulled away in the fourth quarter.

12 May 2013	Olympiacos (Greece)	100–88	(Spain) Real Madrid	The O2 Arena, London
21:00 CEST	Scoring by quarter: 10–27, 27–14, 24–20, 39–27
	Pts: Spanoulis 22; Rebs: Antić 6 Asts: Law 5		Pts: Fernández 21; Rebs: Reyes 6 Asts: Rodríguez, Llull 4	Attendance: 15,169; Referees: Guerrino Cerebuch (ITA), Ilija Belosevic (SRB), Borys Ryzhyk (UKR)

Starters:			Pts	Reb	Ast
PG	5	(United States) Acie Law	20	5	5
SG	7	(Greece) Vassilis Spanoulis	22	2	4
SF	16	(Greece) Kostas Papanikolaou	5	3	1
PF	15	(Greece) Georgios Printezis	5	3	1
C	12	(United States) Josh Powell	2	1	0
Reserves:					
C	4	(United States) Kyle Hines	12	5	3
PF	6	(North Macedonia) Pero Antić	10	6	2
SG	8	(Greece) Stratos Perperoglou	10	1	0
C	9	(Georgia (country)) Giorgi Shermadini	3	1	2
SG	10	(Greece) Kostas Sloukas	11	0	0
SF	13	(Lithuania) Martynas Gecevičius	DNP		
G	19	(Greece) Dimitrios Katsivelis	0	0	1
Head coach:
(Hellenic Basketball Federation) Georgios Bartzokas

Olympiacos	Real Madrid

2012–13 Euroleague
Champions

Olympiacos
3rd title

Starters:			Pts	Reb	Ast
PG	23	(Spain) Sergio Llull	14	3	4
SG	5	(Spain) Rudy Fernández	21	3	3
SF	8	(Spain) Carlos Suárez	5	4	0
PF	12	(Spain) Nikola Mirotić	7	3	0
C	16	(Slovenia) Mirza Begić	6	0	0
Reserves:					
PG	4	(Croatia) Dontaye Draper	0	0	0
PF	9	(Spain) Felipe Reyes	4	6	1
G	13	(Spain) Sergio Rodríguez	17	3	4
G	20	(United States) Jaycee Carroll	5	2	0
F	44	(United States) Marcus Slaughter	9	3	0
C	50	(Brazil) Rafael Hettsheimeir	DNP		
Head coach:
(Spanish Basketball Federation) Pablo Laso

- Team captains (C): (Greece) Vassilis Spanoulis (Olympiacos) and (Spain) Felipe Reyes (Real Madrid)
