= 2012 Euroleague Final Four =

Basketball tournament

- Season: 2011–12 Euroleague

Tournament details
- Arena: Sinan Erdem Dome; Istanbul, Turkey
- Dates: May 11, 2012 – May 13, 2012

Final positions
- Champions: (Greece) Olympiacos (2nd title)
- Runners-up: (Russia) CSKA Moscow
- Third place: (Spain) FC Barcelona
- Fourth place: (Greece) Panathinaikos

Awards and statistics
- MVP: (Greece) Vassilis Spanoulis
- Attendance: 61,048 (total)

The 2012 Euroleague Final Four was the concluding EuroLeague Final Four tournament of the 2011–12 Euroleague season. It was held on May 11–13, 2012. The tournament was hosted at the Sinan Erdem Dome, in Istanbul, Turkey. Olympiacos won its second ever EuroLeague championship, after beating CSKA Moscow in the Final.

In the Final, Georgios Printezis hit a floater with 0.7 seconds remaining on the game clock, after receiving an assist from Vassilis Spanoulis, to win the EuroLeague cup. Spanoulis won his second Final Four MVP after the tournament.

== Venue ==
On May 8, 2011, Euroleague Basketball announced that the Final Four would be held at the Sinan Erdem Dome, in Istanbul. It has a seating capacity of 22,500 for concerts, and 16,000 for the sport of basketball, making it Turkey's largest multi-purpose indoor venue, and the third largest in Europe (although it is not the third largest in Europe in capacity for basketball use). The arena is named after Sinan Erdem (1927–2003), who was the President of the Turkish Olympic Committee, from 1989, until his death in 2003.

Istanbul	2012 Euroleague Final Four (Europe)
Sinan Erdem Dome	2012 Euroleague Final Four (Europe)
Capacity: 16,647	2012 Euroleague Final Four (Europe)

== Bracket ==
All times are CEST (UTC+2).

Semifinals; May 11
(Russia) CSKA Moscow	66
(Greece) Panathinaikos	64
(Greece) Olympiacos	68
(Spain) FC Barcelona Regal	64

Championship game May 13
(Russia) CSKA Moscow	61
(Greece) Olympiacos	62
Third place game
(Greece) Panathinaikos	69
(Spain) FC Barcelona Regal	74

== Semifinal 1 ==
11 May 2012
17:00

Report

CSKA Moscow (Russia)	66–64	(Greece) Panathinaikos
Scoring by quarter: 15–29, 17–5, 19–21, 15–9
Pts: Kirilenko 17; Rebs: Kirilenko 9 Asts: Khryapa 5		Pts: Jasikevičius 19; Rebs: Kaimakoglou 8 Asts: Diamantidis 6

Sinan Erdem Dome, Istanbul
Attendance: 15,262
Referees: Carl Jungebrand (FIN), José Martín (ESP), Streten Radović (CRO)

== Semifinal 2 ==
11 May 2012
20:00

Report

Olympiacos (Greece)	68–64	(Spain) FC Barcelona Regal
Scoring by quarter: 17–11, 16–18, 17–18, 18–17
Pts: Spanoulis 21; Rebs: Mantzaris 6 Asts: Spanoulis 6		Pts: Navarro 18; Rebs: Vázquez 7 Asts: Navarro 3

Sinan Erdem Dome, Istanbul
Attendance: 15,262
Referees: Luigi Lamonica (ITA), Robert Lottermoser (GER), Tolga Sahin (ITA)

== Third-place game ==
13 May 2012
17:00

Report

Panathinaikos (Greece)	69–74	(Spain) FC Barcelona Regal
Scoring by quarter: 20–21, 17–27, 15–10, 17–16
Pts: Diamantidis 17; Rebs: Marić 11; Asts: Calathes 2		Pts: Huertas 21; Rebs: Ndong, Vázquez 5 Asts: Huertas 3

Sinan Erdem Dome, Istanbul
Attendance: 15,262
Referees: Recep Ankarali (TUR), Robert Lottermoser (GER), Olegs Latisevs (LAT)

== Championship game ==
13 May 2012
20:00

Report

CSKA Moscow (Russia)	61–62	(Greece) Olympiacos
Scoring by quarter: 10–7, 24–13, 19–20, 8–22
Pts: Teodosić 15; Rebs: Kirilenko 10; Asts: Teodosić 3		Pts: Papanikolaou 18; Rebs: three players 4 Asts: three players 2

Sinan Erdem Dome, Istanbul
Attendance: 15,550
Referees: Luigi Lamonica (ITA), José Martín (ESP), Tolga Sahin (ITA)

CSKA Moscow	Olympiacos

Starters:			P	R	A
PG	4	(Serbia) Miloš Teodosić	15	4	3
SG	8	(Lithuania) Ramūnas Šiškauskas (C)	8	3	1
SF	31	(Russia) Victor Khryapa	3	6	1
PF	15	(Russia) Andrei Kirilenko	12	10	0
C	12	(Serbia) Nenad Krstić	11	1	0
Reserves:			P	R	A
PF	7	(Lithuania) Darjuš Lavrinovič	5	1	1
PF	11	(Dominican Republic) Sammy Mejia	DNP		
SG	18	(Russia) Evgeny Voronov	0	0	0
PF	20	(Russia) Andrey Vorontsevich	0	1	2
PG	23	(Russia) Alexey Shved	3	2	2
C	24	(Russia) Sasha Kaun	2	0	0
SG	44	(United States) Jamont Gordon	2	1	1
Head coach:
(Lithuania) Jonas Kazlauskas

2011–12 Euroleague
Champions

Olympiacos
2nd title

Starters:			P	R	A
PG	17	(Greece) Vangelis Mantzaris	3	4	2
SG	7	(Greece) Vassilis Spanoulis (C)	15	0	2
SF	10	(Serbia) Marko Kešelj	3	0	0
PF	6	(North Macedonia) Pero Antić	7	2	0
C	9	(United States) Joey Dorsey	0	2	0
Reserves:			P	R	A
PF	4	(United States) Kyle Hines	0	3	1
C	12	(Greece) Lazaros Papadopoulos	0	0	0
SF	13	(Lithuania) Martynas Gecevičius	DNP		
PF	15	(Greece) Georgios Printezis	12	4	1
SF	16	(Greece) Kostas Papanikolaou	18	4	0
SG	18	(Greece) Kostas Sloukas	4	3	2
PG	55	(United States) Acie Law	0	2	0
Head coach:
(Serbia) Dušan Ivković
