= 2025 Acropolis International Basketball Tournament =

Basketball tournament in Greece

Tournament details
- Arena: Telekom Center Athens; Marousi, Athens, Greece
- Dates: Aug 20–22 2025

Final positions
- Champions: Greece (20th title)
- Runners-up: Latvia
- Third place: Italy

Awards and statistics
- Top scorer(s): (Italy) Simone Fontecchio; 13.5 PPG

The 2025 Acropolis International Basketball Tournament was the 34th edition of Greece's annual international basketball competition. It was held from August 20 to August 22, 2025, at the Telekom Center Athens in Marousi, Greece. The tournament served as a preparatory event for EuroBasket 2025, allowing teams to test their rosters and strategies ahead of the European tournament start a few weeks later.

The Acropolis Tournament has been held almost every year since 1986 and continues to be one of the most prestigious friendly competitions in European basketball, attracting top players and national teams from across the continent.

The 2025 edition featured three national teams: Greece, Latvia, and Italy. Latvia made its debut in the tournament, highlighting the event's international appeal. The competition followed a round-robin format, with each team playing against the others once.

A highlight of the tournament was the performance of Giannis Antetokounmpo, who led Greece to a 104–86 victory over Latvia, scoring 25 points in just over 15 minutes of play.

== Venue ==
Greece
Marousi, Athens	Marousi, Athens (Greece)
Telekom Center Athens	Marousi, Athens (Greece)
Capacity: 18,500	Marousi, Athens (Greece)

== Participating teams ==
Team	Appearance			Best performance
Team	Last	Total	Streak	Best performance
Greece	2024	34	34	19× Champions (1989, 1992, 1993, 1996, 1998–2000, 2002, 2003, 2005–2010, 2013, 2015, 2022, 2024)
Italy	2023	19	0	4× Champions (1997, 2001, 2011, 2023)
Latvia	N/A	1	0	debut

== Standings ==
Pos	Team	Pld	W	L	PF	PA	PD	Pts
1	Greece	2	2	0	180	160	+20	4
2	Latvia	2	1	1	169	167	+2	3
3	Italy	2	0	2	137	159	−22	2

Source: sportstats.gr

== Results ==
All times are local Eastern European Summer Time (UTC+3).

20 August 2025
20:00 (UTC+3)

Report

Greece	104–86	Latvia
Scoring by quarter: 30–17, 31–28, 21–21, 22–20
Pts: G.Antetokounmpo 25; Rebs: G.Antetokounmpo10; Asts: Sloukas 10		Pts: Lomažs 17; Rebs: Lomažs 5 Asts: Zoriks 7

Athens, Greece
Attendance: 9,500
Referees: Georgios Poursanidis (GRE), Nikolaos Tziopanos (GRE), Nontas Christinakis (GRE)

21 August 2025
20:00 (UTC+3)

Report

Latvia	83–68	Italy
Scoring by quarter: 25–16, 17–17, 24 16, 17-19
Pts: R.Šmits 13; Rebs: Porziņģis 8 Asts: Porziņģis 6		Pts: Spagnolo 17; Rebs: Niang 10; Asts: Spissu 3

Athens, Greece
Attendance: 9,500
Referees: Georgios Poursanidis (GRE), Nikolaos Tziopanos (GRE), Nontas Christinakis (GRE)

22 August 2025
20:00 (UTC+3)

Report

Italy	74–76	Greece
Scoring by quarter: 20–16, 20–14, 12–27, 22–19
Pts: Fontecchio 18; Rebs: Melli 7 Asts: Pajola 7		Pts: Dorsey 14; Rebs: K.Antetokounmpo 6 Asts: Dorsey, Katsivelis 4

Athens, Greece
Attendance: 13,500
Referees: Karpanos Ilias (GRE), Skandalakis Nikolaos (GRE), Milapidis Nikolaos (GRE)

== Final standing ==
Rank	Team
1st place, gold medalist(s)	Greece
2nd place, silver medalist(s)	Latvia
3rd place, bronze medalist(s)	Italy

2025 Acropolis International Basketball winners

Greece
20th title

== Statistics leaders ==
Category	Player	Total	Average
Points	(Italy) Simone Fontecchio	27	13.5
Rebounds	(Italy) Saliou Niang	16	8.0
Assists	(Latvia) Kristers Zoriks	10	5.0
Steals	(Italy) Darius Thompson	9	4.5
Blocks	(Italy) Momo Diouf	4	2.0

== See also ==
- EuroBasket 2025
