= 2023 Acropolis International Basketball Tournament =

Basketball tournament in Greece

Tournament details
- Arena: OAKA Olympic Indoor Hall; Athens, Greece
- Dates: 8–10 August

Final positions
- Champions: Italy (4th title)
- Runners-up: Serbia
- Third place: Greece

Awards and statistics
- Top scorer(s): Nikos Rogkavopoulos (15.5 PPG)

The 2023 Acropolis International Tournament is a basketball tournament which was held in Telekom Center Athens in Athens, Greece, from August 8 until August 10, 2023. It was the 32nd edition of the Acropolis International Basketball Tournament. The competition is played under FIBA rules as a round-robin tournament. It takes place before the 2023 Basketball World Cup in Philippines, Japan, and Indonesia. The three participating teams were Greece, Italy and Serbia.

== Venue ==
Greece
Marousi, Athens	Marousi, Athens (Greece)
Telekom Center Athens	Marousi, Athens (Greece)
Capacity: 18,500	Marousi, Athens (Greece)

== Participating teams ==
Team	Appearance			Best performance
Team	Last	Total	Streak	Best performance
Greece	2022	32	31	18× Champions (1989, 1992, 1993, 1996, 1998–2000, 2002, 2003, 2005–2010, 2013, 2015, 2022)
Italy	2019	19	3	3× Champions (1997, 2001, 2011)
Serbia	2021	6	5	2x Champions (2019, 2021)

== Standings ==
Team	Pld	W	L	PF	PA	PD	Pts
Italy	2	2	0	163	158	+5	4
Serbia	2	1	1	159	153	+6	3
Greece	2	0	2	134	145	−11	2

== Results ==
All times are local Central European Summer Time (UTC+2).

August 8
19:45

Report

Greece	64–71	Serbia
Scoring by quarter: 13–16, 22–23, 14–18, 15–14
Pts: Rogkavopoulos 19; Rebs: Mitoglou 10; Asts: Walkup 10		Pts: Bogdanović 15; Rebs: Milutinov 12; Asts: Bogdanović 5

O.A.C.A. Olympic Hall, Marousi, Athens
Referees: Tsolakos, Somos, Tsimpouris

August 9
19:45

Report

Serbia	88–89	Italy
Scoring by quarter: 32–19, 15–25, 23–26, 18–19
Pts: N. Jović 18; Rebs: N. Jović 7 Asts: Gudurić 6		Pts: Fontecchio 13; Rebs: Polonara 11; Asts: Severini 5

O.A.C.A. Olympic Hall, Marousi, Athens
Referees: Papapetrou, Tziopanos, Agrafiotis

August 10
19:45

Report

Italy	74–70	Greece
Scoring by quarter: 19–16, 16–15, 22–15, 17–24
Pts: Fontecchio 17; Rebs: Melli 9 Asts: Melli, Spissu 4		Pts: Rogkavopoulos 12; Rebs: Mitoglou 8 Asts: Walkup 7

O.A.C.A. Olympic Hall, Marousi, Athens
Referees: Pitsilkas, Tsonos, Tiganis

== Final standing ==
Rank	Team
1st place, gold medalist(s)	Italy
2nd place, silver medalist(s)	Serbia
3rd place, bronze medalist(s)	Greece

2023 Acropolis International Basketball winners

Italy
Fourth title

== Statistic leaders ==
Category	Player	Total	Average
Points	(Greece) Nikos Rogkavopoulos	31	15.5
Rebounds	(Serbia) Nikola Milutinov	18	9.0
Assists	(Greece) Thomas Walkup	17	8.5
Steals	(Italy) Progida Gabriele	5	2.0
Blocks	(Greece) Georgios Papagiannis	4	2.0

== See also ==
- Italy team for FIBA World Cup 2023 qualification
- 2023 Serbia FIBA Basketball World Cup team
