= 2024 Acropolis International Basketball Tournament =

Basketball tournament in Greece

Tournament details
- Arena: SEF; Piraeus, Athens, Greece
- Dates: June 25–27

Final positions
- Champions: Greece (19th title)
- Runners-up: Montenegro
- Third place: Bahamas

Awards and statistics
- Top scorer(s): (Montenegro) Nikola Vučević; 17.5 PPG

The 2024 Acropolis International Tournament is a basketball tournament which was held in SEF in Piraeus, Greece, from June 25 until June 27, 2024. It was the 33th edition of the Acropolis International Basketball Tournament. The competition is played under FIBA rules as a round-robin tournament.This year tournament was takes place before the 2024 FIBA Men's Olympic Qualifying Tournaments – Piraeus and the 2024 Summer Olympics in France.

== Venue ==
Greece
Neo Faliro, Piraeus, Greece	2024 Acropolis International Basketball Tournament (Greece)
SEF; Capacity: 11,640	2024 Acropolis International Basketball Tournament (Greece)

== Participating teams ==
Team	Appearance			Best performance
Team	Last	Total	Streak	Best performance
Greece	2023	33	32	18× Champions (1989, 1992, 1993, 1996, 1998–2000, 2002, 2003, 2005–2010, 2013, 2015, 2022)
Bahamas	N/A	1	0	debut
Montenegro	N/A	1	0	debut

== Standings ==
Pos	Team	Pld	W	L	PF	PA	PD	Pts
1	Greece	2	2	0	188	132	+56	4
2	Montenegro	2	1	1	150	166	−16	3
3	Bahamas	2	0	2	155	195	−40	2

Source: sportstats.gr

== Results ==
All times are local Eastern European Summer Time (UTC+3).

June 25
20:00

Greece	86–57	Montenegro
Scoring by quarter: 23–12, 22–14, 20–15, 21–16

SEF, Neo Faliro, Piraeus

June 26
20:00

Montenegro	93–80	Bahamas
Scoring by quarter: 16–19, 19–24, 29–15, 29–22

SEF, Neo Faliro, Piraeus

June 27
20:00

Bahamas	75–102	Greece
Scoring by quarter: 15–28, 19–18, 16–31, 25–25

SEF, Neo Faliro, Piraeus

== Final standing ==
Rank	Team
1st place, gold medalist(s)	Greece
2nd place, silver medalist(s)	Montenegro
3rd place, bronze medalist(s)	Bahamas

2024 Acropolis International Basketball winners

Greece
19th title

== Statistic leaders ==
Category	Player	Total	Average
Points	(Montenegro) Nikola Vučević	35	17.5
Rebounds	(Montenegro) Nikola Vučević	26	13.0
Assists	(Greece) Nick Calathes	15	7.5
Steals	(The Bahamas) V. J. Edgecombe	5	2.5
Blocks	(Greece) Kostas Antetokounmpo	3	1.5

== See also ==
- Basketball at the 2024 Summer Olympics
- 2024 FIBA Olympic Qualifying Tournaments
