= 2022 Acropolis International Basketball Tournament =

Tournament details
- Arena: OAKA Olympic Indoor Hall; Athens, Greece
- Dates: 17–19 August

Final positions
- Champions: Greece (18th title)
- Runners-up: Poland
- Third place: Turkey
- Fourth place: Georgia

Awards and statistics
- Top scorer(s): (Georgia (country)) Tornike Shengelia; 20.0 PPG

The 2022 Acropolis International Tournament is a basketball tournament which was held in OAKA Olympic Indoor Hall in Athens, Greece, from August 17. until August 19, 2022. It was the 31st edition of the Acropolis International Basketball Tournament. The competition is played under FIBA rules as a round-robin tournament. The four participating teams were Greece, Poland, Turkey, and Georgia.

== Venue ==
Greece
Marousi, Athens	Marousi, Athens (Greece)
Telekom Center Athens	Marousi, Athens (Greece)
Capacity: 18,500	Marousi, Athens (Greece)

== Participating teams ==
Team	Appearance			Best performance
Team	Last	Total	Streak	Best performance
Greece	2021	31	31	17× Champions (1989, 1992, 1993, 1996, 1998–2000, 2002, 2003, 2005–2010, 2013, 2015)
Poland	2003	3	1	3rd Place (1998, 2003)
Turkey	2019	3	1	Runners-up (2015)
Georgia	2017	2	1	Champions (2017)

== Standings ==
Team	Pld	W	L	PF	PA	PD	Pts
Greece	3	3	0	270	225	+45	6
Poland	3	2	1	252	263	−11	5
Turkey	3	1	2	267	264	+3	4
Georgia	3	0	3	231	268	−37	3

== Results ==
All times are local Central European Summer Time (UTC+2).

August 17
18:00

Report

Turkey	101–88	Georgia
Scoring by quarter: 18-24, 30-22, 27-20, 26-22

O.A.C.A. Olympic Hall, Marousi, Athens

August 17
21:00

Report

Greece	101–78	Poland
Scoring by quarter: 27-10, 23-27, 19-22, 32-19

O.A.C.A. Olympic Hall, Marousi, Athens

August 18
18:00

Report

Poland	87–86	Turkey
Scoring by quarter: 23-17, 12-21, 28-21, 24-27

O.A.C.A. Olympic Hall, Marousi, Athens

August 18
21:00

Report

Georgia	67–80	Greece
Scoring by quarter: 21-16, 16-18, 10-22, 20-24

O.A.C.A. Olympic Hall, Marousi, Athens

August 19
18:00

Report

Georgia	76–87	Poland
Scoring by quarter: 23-22, 18-18, 18-27, 17-20

O.A.C.A. Olympic Hall, Marousi, Athens

August 19
21:00

Report

Greece	89–80	Turkey
Scoring by quarter: 22-15, 20-28, 21-26, 26-11

O.A.C.A. Olympic Hall, Marousi, Athens

== Final standing ==
Rank	Team
1st place, gold medalist(s)	Greece
2nd place, silver medalist(s)	Poland
3rd place, bronze medalist(s)	Turkey
4	Georgia

2022 Acropolis International Basketball winners

Greece
18th title

== Statistic leaders ==
Category	Player	Total	Average
Points	(Georgia (country)) Tornike Shengelia	60	20.0
Rebounds	(Georgia (country)) Alexander Mamukelashvili	29	9.7
Assists	(Poland) Shakub Schenk	16	5.3
Steals	(Greece) Kostas Antetokounmpo	7	2.3
Blocks	(Greece) Kostas Antetokounmpo	5	1.7
