= 1986 Acropolis International Basketball Tournament =

Tournament details
- Arena: SEF; Piraeus, Athens, Greece
- Dates: June 18–20

Final positions
- Champions: Yugoslavia (1st title)
- Runners-up: Italy
- Third place: Greece
- Fourth place: Netherlands

Awards and statistics
- Top scorer(s): (Greece) Nikos Galis (36.0 points per game)

The Acropolis International Tournament 1986 was the first edition of the Acropolis International Basketball Tournament. It was held from June 18 to June 20, 1986, at the SEF arena in Piraeus, Athens, Greece. The competition is played under FIBA rules as a round-robin tournament. The participating teams were the hosts, Greece, as well as Italy, Yugoslavia, and the Netherlands.

The tournament featured famous international basketball players such as Dražen Petrović, Fanis Christodoulou, Nikos Galis, Antonello Riva, Vlade Divac, Rik Smits, Walter Magnifico, Stojko Vranković, Pierluigi Marzorati, and Panagiotis Giannakis.

== Venues ==
| | Greece |
|---|---|
| Neo Faliro, Piraeus, Greece | 1986 Acropolis International Basketball Tournament is located in Greece |
| SEF; Capacity: 11,640 | 1986 Acropolis International Basketball Tournament is located in Greece |

== Participating teams ==
- Greece
- Italy
- Netherlands
- Yugoslavia

== Standings ==
| Team | Pld | W | L | PF | PA | PD | Pts |
|---|---|---|---|---|---|---|---|
| Yugoslavia | 3 | 3 | 0 | 292 | 243 | +49 | 6 |
| Italy | 3 | 2 | 1 | 263 | 246 | +17 | 5 |
| Greece | 3 | 1 | 2 | 282 | 276 | +6 | 4 |
| Netherlands | 3 | 0 | 3 | 227 | 299 | −72 | 3 |

== Results ==
June 18

| Italy | 90–63 | Netherlands |
Scoring by half: 39-34, 51-29

Athens, Greece

June 18

| Greece | 87–95 | Yugoslavia |
Scoring by half: 45-49, 42-46

Athens, Greece

June 19

| Yugoslavia | 105–76 | Netherlands |
Scoring by half: 59-41, 46-35

Athens, Greece

June 19

| Greece | 91–93 | Italy |
Scoring by half: 38-46, 53-47

Athens, Greece

June 20

| Yugoslavia | 92–80 | Italy |
Scoring by half: -, -

Athens, Greece

June 20

| Greece | 104–88 | Netherlands |
Scoring by half: -, -

Athens, Greece

== Final standings ==
| Rank | Team |
|---|---|
| 1st place, gold medalist(s) | Yugoslavia |
| 2nd place, silver medalist(s) | Italy |
| 3rd place, bronze medalist(s) | Greece |
| 4 | Netherlands |

1986 Acropolis International Basketball winners

Yugoslavia
First title

== Statistics ==
First Day:

Greece - Yugoslavia 87-95 (45-49)

GREECE: Galis 40 (1), Stavropoulos, Kambouris 3, Filippou 10, F. Christodoulou 15 (1), Karatzas 7, Pedoulakis 2, A. Christodoulou, Andritsos, Romanidis 6, C. Christodoulou 4.

YUGOSLAVIA: D. Petrović 12 (2), Čutura 12, Cvjetičanin 31 (3), A. Petrović 15 (4), Vranković 10, Radovanović 17, Mutapčić 1, Radović 7, Petranović.
Italy - Holland 90-63 (39-34)

ITALY: Magnifico 9, Costa 10, Polesello 7, Brunamonti 15, Villalta 2, Riva 12 (1), Sacchetti 1, Premier 9 (1), dell'Agnello, Smparo, Gilardi 6, Binelli.

HOLLAND: Schilp 10, de Waard 6, Bottse 2, Esveldt, Smits 21, Ebeltjes 4, van Dinten 13, Heijdeman 7, Griekspoor, Broukman.
2nd Day:

Greece - Italy 91-93 (38-46)

GREECE: Galis 22, Giannakis 23 (5), Karatzas 6, Filippou 8, F. Christodoulou 9 (1), Kambouris 12, Romanidis 7 (1), A. Christodoulou, Pedoulakis, Andritsos 2, Stavropoulos 2, Melissinos.

ITALY: Riva 15 (2), dell'Agnello, Villalta 18, Gilardi 6, Sacchetti 10, Brunamonti 5, Polesello 8, Magnifico 11, Ritsi 2, Marzorati 10, Premier 6.
Yugoslavia - Holland 105-76 (59-41)

YUGOSLAVIA: D. Petrović 42 (4), Divac 6, Petranović 6, Mutapčić 7 (1), A. Petrović 13 (3), Radović 1, Vranković 2, Arapović 4, Radovanović 12, Čutura 8, Cvjetičanin 4.

HOLLAND: Schilp 11 (1), Bottse 15 (1), Esveldt 4, Smits 18, Ebeltjes 2, Emanoyels 6 (2), de Waard, van Dinten 8, Egkmont, Heijdeman 8, Griekspoor 4.
3rd Day:

Greece - Holland 104-88

GREECE: Galis 46 (1), Giannakis 10 (1), Kambouris 4, Melissinos, Stavropoulos 8, F. Christodoulou 10, Andritsos, Filippou 11, Romanidis 2, Pedoulakis 3 (1), Karatzas 8, Dimakopoulos 2.

HOLLAND: Smits 20, Bottse 11, Schilp 17 (1), Ebeltjes 4, Esveldt, Heijdeman 9, van Dinten 19, de Waard, Broukman 6.
Yugoslavia - Italy 92-80

YUGOSLAVIA: D. Petrović 26 (3), A. Petrović 16 (3), Divac 7, Čutura 17, Petranović 4, Radović 5, Vranković, Radovanović 14, Arapović 3.

ITALY: Magnifico 9, Polesello, Gilardi 2, Brunamonti 9, Villalta 11, Binelli 8, Riva 14 (2), Sacchetti 5, Caste 2, Marzorati 3, Ritsi, Premier 10 (2).

Top Scorers

| Player | Pts. | G | PPG |
|---|---|---|---|
| (Greece) Nikos Galis | 108 | 3 | 36.0 |
| (Socialist Federal Republic of Yugoslavia) Dražen Petrović | 80 | 3 | 26.7 |
| (Netherlands) Rik Smits | 59 | 3 | 19.7 |
| (Socialist Federal Republic of Yugoslavia) Danko Cvjetičanin | 35 | 2 | 17.5 |
| (Greece) Panagiotis Giannakis | 33 | 2 | 16.5 |
