= 2019 Acropolis International Basketball Tournament =

Tournament details
- Arena: OAKA Olympic Indoor Hall; Athens, Greece
- Dates: August 16–18

Final positions
- Champions: Serbia (6th title)
- Runners-up: Greece
- Third place: Turkey
- Fourth place: Italy

Awards and statistics
- Top scorer(s): (Serbia) Bogdan Bogdanović; 20.0 PPG

The Acropolis International Tournament 2019 is a basketball tournament held in OAKA Olympic Indoor Hall in Athens, Greece, from August 16 until August 18, 2019. It was the 29th edition of the Acropolis International Basketball Tournament. The competition is played under FIBA rules as a round-robin tournament. The four participating teams were Greece, Italy, Serbia, and Turkey.

The Serbia roster went undefeated and won the tournament.

== Venues ==
| Marousi, Athens | 2019 Acropolis International Basketball Tournament (Greece) |
| O.A.C.A. Olympic Indoor Hall | 2019 Acropolis International Basketball Tournament (Greece) |
| Capacity: 18,989 | 2019 Acropolis International Basketball Tournament (Greece) |

== Participating teams ==
| Team | Appearance | | | Best performance |
| Team | Last | Total | Streak | Best performance |
|---|---|---|---|---|
| Greece | 2017 | 29 | 29 | 17× Champions (1989, 1992, 1993, 1996, 1998–2000, 2002, 2003, 2005–2010, 2013, 2015) |
| Italy | 2017 | 18 | 2 | 3× Champions (1997, 2001, 2011) |
| Serbia | 2017 | 4 | 2 | Runners-up (2009) |
| Turkey | 2015 | 2 | 1 | Runners-up (2015) |

== Standings ==
| Pos | Team | Pld | W | L | PF | PA | PD | Pts |
|---|---|---|---|---|---|---|---|---|
| 1 | Serbia | 3 | 3 | 0 | 268 | 216 | +52 | 6 |
| 2 | Greece | 3 | 2 | 1 | 247 | 218 | +29 | 5 |
| 3 | Turkey | 3 | 1 | 2 | 214 | 241 | −27 | 4 |
| 4 | Italy | 3 | 0 | 3 | 197 | 251 | −54 | 3 |

Source: Flashscore

== Results ==
All times are local Central European Summer Time (UTC+2).

August 16
18:00

Boxscore

| Serbia | 87–72 | Turkey |
Scoring by quarter: 25–18, 19–18, 27–18, 16–18
| Pts: Jokić 18; Rebs: Jokić 11; Asts: Jović 8 | | Pts: Korkmaz 16; Rebs: Osman 8 Asts: Osman 5 |

O.A.C.A. Olympic Hall, Marousi, Athens
Attendance: not available
Referees: Chrysostomos Schinas, Nikolaos Somos, Nikolaos Tziopanos

August 16
20:30

Boxscore

| Greece | 83–63 | Italy |
Scoring by quarter: 27–13, 22–15, 16–19, 18–16
| Pts: G. Antetokounmpo 18; Rebs: Bourousis 17; Asts: Calathes 7 | | Pts: Belinelli 13; Rebs: Biligha, Hackett 8 Asts: Vitali 4 |

O.A.C.A. Olympic Hall, Marousi, Athens
Attendance: not available
Referees: Elias Koromilas, Petros Papapetrou, George Andrikopoulos

August 17
18:00

Boxscore

| Italy | 64–96 | Serbia |
Scoring by quarter: 15–14, 17–31, 17–24, 15–27
| Pts: Belinelli 16; Rebs: Tessitori 5 Asts: Biligha, Vitali 3 | | Pts: Jokić 20; Rebs: Bjelica, Marjanović 7 Asts: Micić 5 |

O.A.C.A. Olympic Hall, Marousi, Athens
Attendance: not available
Referees: Chrysostomos Schinas, Vasiliki Tsaroucha, Anastasios Kardaris

August 17
20:30

Boxscore

| Greece | 84–70 | Turkey |
Scoring by quarter: 24–17, 18–20, 21–20, 21–13
| Pts: Printezis 18; Rebs: G. Antetokounmpo 10; Asts: Calathes 6 | | Pts: Korkmaz 25; Rebs: Korkmaz 8 Asts: Korkmaz 5 |

O.A.C.A. Olympic Hall, Marousi, Athens
Attendance: not available
Referees: Petros Papapetrou, Christos Panagiotoum, Panagiotis Diamantis

August 18
18:00

Boxscore

| Turkey | 72–70 | Italy |
Scoring by quarter: 12–19, 26–16, 10–26, 24–9
| Pts: Osman 20; Rebs: İlyasova 11; Asts: Wilbekin 4 | | Pts: Gentile 26; Rebs: Brooks 9 Asts: Belinelli 4 |

O.A.C.A. Olympic Hall, Marousi, Athens
Attendance: 2,000
Referees: Charalampos Karakatsounis, Nikolaos Somos, Dimitrios Zacharis

August 18
20:30

Boxscore

| Greece | 80–85 (OT) | Serbia |
Scoring by quarter: 19–17, 19–14, 19–21, 15–20, Overtime: 8–13
| Pts: G. Antetokounmpo 20; Rebs: Bourousis 6 Asts: Calathes 7 | | Pts: Bogdanović 28; Rebs: Bjelica 14; Asts: Jović 6 |

O.A.C.A. Olympic Hall, Marousi, Athens
Attendance: 18,000
Referees: Elias Koromilas, Vasiliki Tsaroucha, Nikolaos Pitsilkas

== Final standing ==
| Rank | Team |
|---|---|
| 1st place, gold medalist(s) | Serbia |
| 2nd place, silver medalist(s) | Greece |
| 3rd place, bronze medalist(s) | Turkey |
| 4 | Italy |

2019 Acropolis International Basketball winners

Serbia
Sixth title

== Statistics ==
Top Scorers

| Pos. | Name | G | Pts | PPG |
|---|---|---|---|---|
| 1 | (Serbia) Bogdan Bogdanović | 3 | 60 | 20.0 |
| 2 | (Serbia) Nikola Jokić | 2 | 38 | 19.0 |
| 3 | (Greece) Giannis Antetokounmpo | 3 | 54 | 18.0 |
| 4 | (Turkey) Furkan Korkmaz | 3 | 53 | 17.7 |
| 5 | (Turkey) Ersan Ilyasova | 3 | 45 | 15.0 |

Rebounds

| Pos. | Name | G | Rbs | RPG |
|---|---|---|---|---|
| 1 | (Greece) Ioannis Bourousis | 2 | 23 | 11.5 |
| 2 | (Serbia) Nemanja Bjelica | 3 | 24 | 8.0 |
| 3 | (Serbia) Nikola Jokić | 2 | 15 | 7.5 |
| 4 | (Turkey) Ersan Ilyasova | 3 | 20 | 6.7 |
| 5 | (Greece) Giannis Antetokounmpo | 3 | 19 | 6.3 |

Assists

| Pos. | Name | G | Ast | APG |
|---|---|---|---|---|
| 1 | (Greece) Nick Calathes | 3 | 20 | 6.7 |
| 2 | (Serbia) Stefan Jović | 3 | 18 | 6.0 |
| 3 | (Serbia) Vasilije Micić | 3 | 15 | 5.0 |
| 4 | (Turkey) Scott Wilbekin | 3 | 11 | 3.7 |
| 5 | (Turkey) Furkan Korkmaz | 3 | 10 | 3.3 |

Steals

| Pos. | Name | G | Stls | SPG |
|---|---|---|---|---|
| 1 | (Greece) Giannis Antetokounmpo | 3 | 7 | 2.3 |
| 1 | (Serbia) Bogdan Bogdanović | 3 | 7 | 2.3 |
| 3 | (Greece) Ioannis Bourousis | 2 | 4 | 2.0 |
| 3 | (Italy) Paul Biligha | 3 | 6 | 2.0 |
| 5 | (Turkey) Furkan Korkmaz | 3 | 5 | 1.7 |

Blocks

| Pos. | Name | G | Blocks | BPG |
|---|---|---|---|---|
| 1 | (Greece) Giannis Antetokounmpo | 3 | 8 | 2.7 |
| 2 | (Greece) Georgios Papagiannis | 3 | 6 | 2.0 |
| 3 | (Greece) Thanasis Antetokounmpo | 3 | 2 | 0.7 |
| 3 | (Greece) Georgios Printezis | 3 | 2 | 0.7 |
| 3 | (Turkey) Semih Erden | 3 | 2 | 0.7 |

Foul

| Pos. | Name | G | Foul | FPG |
|---|---|---|---|---|
| 1 | (Italy) Amedeo Tessitori | 3 | 12 | 4.0 |
| 2 | (Greece) Giannoulis Larentzakis | 3 | 10 | 3.3 |
| 2 | (Turkey) Ersan Ilyasova | 3 | 10 | 3.3 |
| 4 | (Turkey) Semih Erden | 3 | 9 | 3.0 |
| 4 | (Italy) Paul Biligha | 3 | 9 | 3.0 |

== See also ==
- 2019 Italy FIBA Basketball World Cup team
- 2019 Serbia FIBA Basketball World Cup team
