= 2004 Acropolis International Basketball Tournament =

Basketball Tournament

Tournament details
- Arena: Glyfada; Athens, Greece
- Dates: July 26–28

Final positions
- Champions: Lithuania (1st title)
- Runners-up: Greece
- Third place: Italy
- Fourth place: Brazil

Awards and statistics
- MVP: (Greece) Nikos Chatzivrettas

The 18th edition of the Acropolis International Basketball Tournament 2004 took place between 26 and 28 July 2004 in Athens. The six games took place in the Glyfada sports hall in the south of Athens.

In addition to the host Greek national team, national teams from Brazil, Lithuania and eventual Olympic silver medalist, Italy.

Stars of the 2004 Acropolis tournament included Nikolaos Chatzivrettas, (MVP), Dimitrios Diamantidis and Theodoros Papaloukas the Italian Denis Marconato, Leandro Barbosa from Brazil as well Šarūnas Jasikevičius, Arvydas Macijauskas, Ramūnas Šiškauskas and Darius Songaila from Lithuania.

== Venues ==
	Greece
Glyfada, Athens, Greece	2004 Acropolis International Basketball Tournament is located in Greece
Glyfada; Capacity: 2,272	2004 Acropolis International Basketball Tournament is located in Greece

== Participating teams ==
- Brazil
- Greece
- Italy
- Lithuania

== Standings ==
Team	Pld	W	L	PF	PA	PD	Pts	Tie
Lithuania	3	2	1	262	225	+37	5	1–1 +20
Greece	3	2	1	240	196	+44	5	1–1 0
Italy	3	2	1	221	234	−13	5	1–1 -20
Brazil	3	0	3	230	298	−68	3	

== Results ==
July 26

Lithuania	88–67	Italy
Scoring by half: 44–28, 44–39

Glyfada, Athens

July 26

Greece	105–61	Brazil
Scoring by half: 52–26, 53–35

Glyfada, Athens

July 27

Lithuania	110–93	Brazil
Scoring by half: 59–36, 51–57

Glyfada, Athens

July 27

Greece	70–71	Italy
Scoring by half: 39–31, 31–40

Glyfada, Athens

July 28

Italy	83–76	Brazil
Scoring by half: 43–35, 40–41

Glyfada, Athens

July 28

Greece	65–64	Lithuania
Scoring by half: 31–30, 34–34

Glyfada, Athens

== Final standings ==
Rank	Team
1st place, gold medalist(s)	Lithuania
2nd place, silver medalist(s)	Greece
3rd place, bronze medalist(s)	Italy
4	Brazil

2004 Acropolis International Basketball winners

Lithuania
First title

Most Valuable Player
(Greece) Nikos Chatzivrettas
