= 2021 Acropolis International Basketball Tournament =

Tournament details
- Arena: OAKA Olympic Indoor Hall; Athens, Greece
- Dates: 18–20 June

Final positions
- Champions: Serbia (7th title)
- Runners-up: Greece
- Third place: Puerto Rico
- Fourth place: Mexico

Awards and statistics
- Top scorer(s): (Serbia) Filip Petrusev; 18.3 PPG

The 2021 Acropolis International Tournament is a basketball tournament which was held in OAKA Olympic Indoor Hall in Athens, Greece, from June 18. until June 20, 2021. It was the 30th edition of the Acropolis International Basketball Tournament. The competition is played under FIBA rules as a round-robin tournament. It takes place before the 2020 Summer Olympics in Japan. The four participating teams will be Greece, Serbia, Mexico, and Puerto Rico.

== Venues ==
Athens	Greece
Marousi, Athens	2021 Acropolis International Basketball Tournament is located in Greece
Olympic Indoor Hall; Capacity: 18,989	2021 Acropolis International Basketball Tournament is located in Greece

== Participating national teams ==
Team	Appearance			Best performance
Team	Last	Total	Streak	Best performance
Greece	2019	30	30	17× Champions (1989, 1992, 1993, 1996, 1998–2000, 2002, 2003, 2005–2010, 2013, 2015)
Mexico	N/A	1	1	Debut
Puerto Rico	N/A	1	1	Debut
Serbia	2019	5	3	Champions (2019)

== Standings ==
Pos	Team	Pld	W	L	PF	PA	PD	Pts
1	Serbia	3	3	0	259	199	+60	6
2	Greece	3	2	1	242	242	0	5
3	Puerto Rico	3	1	2	212	229	−17	4
4	Mexico	3	0	3	237	280	−43	3

Source: sportstats.gr

== Results ==
All times are local Eastern European Summer Time (UTC+3).

18 June 2021
17:00

Report

Puerto Rico	68–80	Serbia
Scoring by quarter: 21–19, 11–28, 14–13, 22–20
Pts: Browne 19; Rebs: Conditt 7 Asts: Gandía		Pts: Petrušev 21; Rebs: Bjelica 12; Asts: Avramović, Bjelica 5

O.A.C.A. Olympic Hall, Marousi, Athens
Referees: Symeonidis, Psarianos, Magklogiannis

18 June 2021
20:00

Report

Greece	101–98	Mexico
Scoring by quarter: 26–20, 26–24, 22–24, 27–30
Pts: Sloukas 24; Rebs: Giannopoulos 7 Asts: Sloukas 6		Pts: Méndez-Valdez 24; Rebs: Ramos, Stoll 5 Asts: Stoll 10

O.A.C.A. Olympic Hall, Marousi, Athens
Referees: Koromilas, Manos, Somos

19 June 2021
17:00

Report

Serbia	104–67	Mexico
Scoring by quarter: 27–20, 24–15, 34–13, 19–19
Pts: Petrušev 23; Rebs: Petrušev 9 Asts: Milosavljević, Bjelica 5		Pts: De Haro 11; Rebs: Jaimes 13; Asts: Stoll 4

O.A.C.A. Olympic Hall, Marousi, Athens
Referees: Papapetrou, Tziopanos, Tsolakos

19 June 2021
20:00

Report

Greece	77–69	Puerto Rico
Scoring by quarter: 14–18, 18–13, 15–19, 30–19
Pts: Antetokounmpo 14; Rebs: Kavvadas 9 Asts: Sloukas 7		Pts: Piñeiro 17; Rebs: Conditt 10; Asts: Browne 5

O.A.C.A. Olympic Hall, Marousi, Athens
Referees: Koromilas, Manos, Somos

20 June 2021
17:00

Report

Mexico	72–75	Puerto Rico
Scoring by quarter: 9–18, 25–25, 24–14, 14–18
Pts: Estrada, Girón 17; Rebs: Jaimes 15; Asts: Stoll 12		Pts: Clavell 17; Rebs: Parker-Rivera 9 Asts: Browne 8

O.A.C.A. Olympic Hall, Marousi, Athens
Referees: Papapetrou, Pitsilkas, Zacharis

20 June 2021
20:00

Report

Greece	64–75	Serbia
Scoring by quarter: 21–19, 13–18, 11–23, 19–15
Pts: Mitoglou 17; Rebs: Mitoglou 10; Asts: Lountzis 4		Pts: Avramović, Dobrić 18; Rebs: Bjelica 11; Asts: Bjelica, Jović 5

O.A.C.A. Olympic Hall, Marousi, Athens
Referees: Koromilas, Manos, Somos

== Final standing ==
Rank	Team
1st place, gold medalist(s)	Serbia
2nd place, silver medalist(s)	Greece
3rd place, bronze medalist(s)	Puerto Rico
4	Mexico

2021 Acropolis International Basketball winners

Serbia
Seventh title

== Statistic leaders ==
Category	Player	Total	Average
Points	(Serbia) Filip Petrušev	55	18.3
Rebounds	(Italy) Fabian Jaimes	29	9.7
Assists	(Mexico) Paul Stoll	26	8.7
Steals	(Greece) Dinos Mitoglou	7	2.3
Blocks	(Greece) Kostas Antetokounmpo	5	1.7

== See also ==
- 2020 Serbia men's OQT basketball team
