= Acropolis International Basketball Tournament =

International basketball tournament

- Sport: Basketball
- Founded: 1986; 40 years ago
- First season: 1986
- CEO: Andreas Miaoulis
- No. of teams: 3 or 5
- Countries: FIBA members
- Most recent champion: Greece (21 titles)
- Most titles: Greece (21 titles)
- Broadcaster: ERT World
- Website: Basket.gr

The Acropolis International Basketball Tournament (also known as the Acropolis of Athens Basketball Tournament and the Acropolis Basketball Cup) (Greek: Τουρνουά Ακρόπολις) is an international basketball competition that is played between national teams, which has been held almost every year since 1986, and takes place in Athens, Greece, during the summer. It takes place before the big official FIBA tournaments like the FIBA Summer Olympic Games, the FIBA World Olympic Qualifying Tournament, the FIBA World Cup, and the FIBA EuroBasket. The tournament is named after the Athenian Acropolis. The competition is played under FIBA rules.

The tournament is organized by the Hellenic Basketball Federation (HBF), which is a member of FIBA Europe.

== Venues ==
Time Period	Arena
1986–1989	Peace and Friendship Stadium SEF
1990	Glyfada Makis Liougas Sportshall
1991 (FIBA Jubilee Centennial); 1992–1994	Peace and Friendship Stadium SEF
1995–1996	Nikos Galis Olympic Indoor Hall
1997	Peace and Friendship Stadium SEF
1998	Nikos Galis Olympic Indoor Hall
1999	Peace and Friendship Stadium SEF
2000–2002	Nikos Galis Olympic Indoor Hall
2003–2004	Glyfada Makis Liougas Sportshall
2005–2023	Nikos Galis Olympic Indoor Hall
2024	Peace and Friendship Stadium SEF
2025–2026	Telekom Center Athens

== History ==
The tournament's host team, the senior men's Greek National Basketball Team, has won the tournament 18 times so far, last one 2022. In 1991, the Hellenic Basketball Federation and FIBA Europe, joined together to hold the special edition 1991 FIBA Centennial Jubilee, commemorating the 100th anniversary of the sport of basketball. The Centennial Jubilee Tournament is not counted with the other Acropolis Tournaments, because it was not solely organized by the Hellenic Basketball Federation.

To date, there have been 32 official Acropolis Tournaments that have been organized by the Hellenic Basketball Federation, plus the unofficial special edition 1991 FIBA Centennial Jubilee. The Greek national team did not host the 2012 Acropolis Tournament, because it participated in the 2012 FIBA World Olympic qualifying tournament, and failed to qualify for the Olympics that year. There was also no Acropolis Tournament in the years 2014, 2016, 2018 and 2020.

=== 1991 FIBA Centennial Jubilee ===
The 1991 FIBA Centennial Jubilee was the special edition tournament that was organized jointly by FIBA Europe and the Hellenic Basketball Federation to commemorate the 100 year anniversary of the sport of basketball. It is not counted officially with the other 32 Acropolis International Tournaments because it was not solely organized by the Hellenic Basketball Federation. It was contested by France, Greece, Italy, Yugoslavia, Spain, and the Soviet Union.

== Acropolis Tournament standings ==
Year	Arena	Gold Medal	Silver Medal	Bronze Medal	4th Place	5th Place
1986 (Details)	Peace and Friendship Stadium	Yugoslavia	Italy	Greece	Netherlands	N/A
1987 (Details)	Peace and Friendship Stadium	Yugoslavia	Greece	Czechoslovakia	Canada	N/A
1988 (Details)	Peace and Friendship Stadium	Yugoslavia	Greece	Italy	(United States); Duke Blue Devils	N/A
1989 (Details)	Peace and Friendship Stadium	Greece	Italy	(United States); ACC All Stars	Netherlands	N/A
1990 (Details)	Glyfada Indoor Hall	Argentina	Greece	Czechoslovakia	China	N/A
1992 (Details)	Peace and Friendship Stadium	Greece	Lithuania	Italy	France	N/A
1993 (Details)	Peace and Friendship Stadium	Greece	Bulgaria	Russia	(United States); College NCAA DI All Stars	N/A
1994 (Details)	Peace and Friendship Stadium	Serbia All Stars	Russia	Greece	Italy	Argentina
1995 (Details)	Olympic Indoor Hall	FR Yugoslavia	Greece	(United States); College NCAA DI All Stars	Slovenia	N/A
1996 (Details)	Olympic Indoor Hall	Greece	(United States); NIT All Stars	Italy	Germany	N/A
1997 (Details)	Peace and Friendship Stadium	Italy	Greece	France	Germany	N/A
1998 (Details)	Olympic Indoor Hall	Greece	(United States); College NCAA DI All Stars	Poland	Japan	N/A
1999 (Details)	Peace and Friendship Stadium	Greece	Italy	Australia	Russia	N/A
2000 (Details)	Olympic Indoor Hall	Greece	Russia	Brazil	Hungary	N/A
2001 (Details)	Olympic Indoor Hall	Italy	Greece	FR Yugoslavia	Lithuania	N/A
2002 (Details)	Olympic Indoor Hall	Greece	Lithuania	Italy	Croatia	N/A
2003 (Details)	Glyfada Indoor Hall	Greece	Slovenia	Poland	Israel	N/A
2004 (Details)	Glyfada Indoor Hall	Lithuania	Greece	Italy	Brazil	N/A
2005 (Details)	Olympic Indoor Hall	Greece	Serbia and Montenegro	Italy	Germany	N/A
2006 (Details)	Olympic Indoor Hall	Greece	France	Croatia	Italy	N/A
2007 (Details)	Olympic Indoor Hall	Greece	Lithuania	Slovenia	Italy	N/A
2008 (Details)	Olympic Indoor Hall	Greece	Brazil	Croatia	Australia	N/A
2009 (Details)	Olympic Indoor Hall	Greece	Serbia	Lithuania	Russia	N/A
2010 (Details)	Olympic Indoor Hall	Greece	Slovenia	Serbia	Canada	N/A
2011 (Details)	Olympic Indoor Hall	Italy	Greece	Bulgaria	(United States); BYU Cougars	N/A
2013 (Details)	Olympic Indoor Hall	Greece	Lithuania	Italy	Bosnia and Herzegovina	N/A
2015 (Details)	Olympic Indoor Hall	Greece	Turkey	Lithuania	Netherlands	N/A
2017 (Details)	Olympic Indoor Hall	Georgia	Serbia	Greece	Italy	N/A
2019 (Details)	Olympic Indoor Hall	Serbia	Greece	Turkey	Italy	N/A
2021 (Details)	Olympic Indoor Hall	Serbia	Greece	Puerto Rico	Mexico	N/A
2022 (Details)	Olympic Indoor Hall	Greece	Poland	Turkey	Georgia	N/A
2023 (Details)	Olympic Indoor Hall	Italy	Serbia	Greece	N/A	
2024 (Details)	Peace and Friendship Stadium	Greece	Montenegro	Bahamas	N/A	
2025 (Details)	Telekom Center Athens	Greece	Latvia	Italy	N/A	
2026 (Details)	Telekom Center Athens	Greece	Cyprus	N/A		

== Medals summary ==
Rank	Nation	Gold	Silver	Bronze	Total
1	Greece	21	10	4	35
2	Yugoslavia	7	4	2	13
3	Italy	4	3	8	15
4	Lithuania	1	4	2	7
5	Argentina	1	0	0	1
5	Georgia	1	0	0	1
7	United States	0	2	2	4
8	Russia	0	2	1	3
8	Slovenia	0	2	1	3
10	Poland	0	1	2	3
10	Turkey	0	1	2	3
12	Brazil	0	1	1	2
12	Bulgaria	0	1	1	2
12	France	0	1	1	2
15	Cyprus	0	1	0	1
15	Latvia	0	1	0	1
15	Montenegro	0	1	0	1
18	Croatia	0	0	2	2
18	Czechoslovakia	0	0	2	2
20	Australia	0	0	1	1
20	Bahamas	0	0	1	1
20	Puerto Rico	0	0	1	1
Totals (22 entries)		35	35	34	104

== Results by country ==
Rank	Country	Gold	Silver	Bronze	4th	5th	App.
1.	Greece	21	10	4	0	0	35
2.	Italy	4	3	8	5	0	20
3.	Yugoslavia	3	0	0	0	0	3
4.	Serbia	2	3	1	0	0	6
5.	Serbia and Montenegro	2	1	1	0	0	4
6.	Lithuania	1	4	2	1	0	8
7.	Argentina	1	0	0	0	1	2
8.	Georgia	1	0	0	1	0	2
9.	United States	0	2	2	3	0	7
10.	Russia	0	2	1	2	0	5
11.	Slovenia	0	2	1	1	0	4
12.	Brazil	0	1	1	1	0	3
13.	France	0	1	1	1	0	3
14.	Bulgaria	0	1	1	0	0	2
15.	Turkey	0	1	2	0	0	3
16.	Latvia	0	1	0	0	0	1
17.	Croatia	0	0	2	1	0	3
18.	Czechoslovakia	0	0	2	0	0	2
19.	Poland	0	1	2	0	0	3
20.	Montenegro	0	1	0	0	0	1
21.	Cyprus	0	1	0	0	0	1
22.	Australia	0	0	1	1	0	2
23.	Puerto Rico	0	0	1	0	0	1
24.	Bahamas	0	0	1	0	0	1
25.	Germany	0	0	0	3	0	3
26.	Netherlands	0	0	0	3	0	3
26.	Canada	0	0	0	2	0	2
27.	China	0	0	0	1	0	1
28.	Israel	0	0	0	1	0	1
29.	Japan	0	0	0	1	0	1
30.	Hungary	0	0	0	1	0	1
31.	Bosnia and Herzegovina	0	0	0	1	0	1
32.	Mexico	0	0	0	1	0	1
33.	South Sudan	0	0	0	0	0	1
34.	Cape Verde	0	0	0	0	0	1
35.	Estonia	0	0	0	0	0	1
36.	Romania	0	0	0	0	0	1

== Top scorers ==
Year	Top Scorer	Points Per Game
1986	(Greece) Nikos Galis	36.0
1987	(Greece) Nikos Galis (2×)	37.3
1988		
1989		
1990		
1992		
1993		
1994		
1995		
1996		
1997		
1998		
1999		
2000		
2001		
2002		
2003		
2004		
2005		
2006		
2007	(Lithuania) Ramūnas Šiškauskas	14.3
2008	(Greece) Vassilis Spanoulis	15.3
2009	(Lithuania) Marijonas Petravičius	14.7
2010		
2011	(Italy) Danilo Gallinari	18.7
2013		
2015		
2017		
2019	(Serbia) Bogdan Bogdanović	20.0
2021	(Serbia) Filip Petrušev	18.3
2022	(Georgia (country)) Toko Shengelia	20.0
2023	(Greece) Nikos Rogkavopoulos	15.5
2024	(Montenegro) Nikola Vučević	17.5
2025	(Italy) Simone Fontecchio	13.5

== MVP awards ==
Year	MVP Award Winner
1986–1995	Not awarded
1996	(Greece) Fanis Christodoulou
1997	(Italy) Carlton Myers
1998	(Greece) Efthimios Rentzias
1999	(Greece) Georgios Sigalas
2000	(Greece) Fragiskos Alvertis
2001	(Italy) Gregor Fučka
2002	(Greece) Antonis Fotsis
2003	(Greece) Nikos Chatzivrettas
2004	(Greece) Nikos Chatzivrettas (2×)
2005	(Greece) Dimitris Diamantidis
2006	(Greece) Dimitris Diamantidis (2×)
2007	(Greece) Vassilis Spanoulis
2008	(Greece) Antonis Fotsis (2×)
2009	(Greece) Vassilis Spanoulis (2×)
2010	(Greece) Sofoklis Schortsanitis
2011	(Greece) Antonis Fotsis (3×)
2013	(Greece) Nikos Zisis
2015–2025	Not awarded

== Top scoring team by year ==
Year	Team	TPS	GP	PPG	TTP
1986	Yugoslavia	292	3	97.3	1,064
1987	Yugoslavia	306	3	102.0	1,119
1988	Yugoslavia	271	3	90.3	1,051
1989	Italy	272	3	90.7	977
1990	Argentina	315	3	105.0	1,122
1992	Lithuania	306	3	102.0	993
1993	Greece	277	3	92.3	991
1994	FR Yugoslavia	360	4	90.0	1,554
1995	FR Yugoslavia	242	3	80.7	942
1996	United States	246	3	82.0	889
1997	Greece	242	3	80.7	876
1998	Greece	264	3	88.0	837
1999	Italy	241	3	80.3	899
2000	Russia	238	3	79.3	832
2001	Lithuania	229	3	76.3	869
2002	Croatia	232	3	77.3	892
2003	Greece	240	3	80.0	887
2004	Lithuania	262	3	87.3	953
2005	Greece	264	3	88.0	983
2006	Greece	219	3	73.0	804
2007	Lithuania	244	3	81.3	908
2008	Greece	238	3	79.3	912
2009	Lithuania	221	3	73.7	829
2010	Greece	293	3	97.7	927
2011	Greece	265	3	88.3	778
2013	Greece	247	3	82.3	889
2015	Netherlands	246	3	82.0	900
2017	Greece	211	3	70.3	832
2019	Serbia	268	3	89.3	926
2021	Serbia	259	3	86.3	950
2022	Greece	270	3	90.0	1,020
2023	Italy	163	2	81.5	456
2024	Greece	188	2	94.0	493
2025	Greece	180	2	90.0	491

Key:

- TPS - Total Points Scored
- GP - Game Played
- PPG - Points Per Game
- TTP - Tournament Total Points

== See also ==
- Basketball at the Summer Olympics
- FIBA Basketball World Cup
- FIBA Asia Cup
- FIBA Diamond Ball
- Adecco Cup
- Marchand Continental Championship Cup
- Belgrade Trophy
- Stanković Cup
- William Jones Cup
