= 2003 Acropolis International Basketball Tournament =

Basketball Tournament

Tournament details
- Arena: Glyfada; Athens, Greece
- Dates: August 25–27

Final positions
- Champions: Greece (9th title)
- Runners-up: Slovenia
- Third place: Poland
- Fourth place: Israel

Awards and statistics
- MVP: (Greece) Nikos Chatzivrettas

The 17. Edition of the Acropolis International Basketball Tournament 2003 found between the 25. and 27. August 2003 in Athens. There at the Olympic Hall given the upcoming Olympic Games After modernization work was carried out, the six games took place in the Glyfada sports hall in the south of Athens.

In addition to the host Greek national team also included the national teams Slovenia and Poland. The field of participants was completed by the national team from Israel, which took part in the tournament for the first time.

In addition to the Greeks, the stars of the 2003 Acropolis tournament included Dimitrios Diamantidis and Theodoros Papaloukas the Slovenian Boštjan neighbor.

As MVP the Greek became the tournament Nikolaos Chatzivrettas excellent.

== Venues ==
	Greece
Glyfada, Athens, Greece	2003 Acropolis International Basketball Tournament is located in Greece
Glyfada; Capacity: 2,272	2003 Acropolis International Basketball Tournament is located in Greece

== Participating teams ==
- Greece
- Israel
- Poland
- Slovenia

== Standings ==
Team	Pld	W	L	PF	PA	PD	Pts
Greece	3	3	0	240	174	+66	6
Slovenia	3	2	1	228	223	+5	5
Poland	3	1	2	211	253	−42	4
Israel	3	0	3	208	237	−29	3

== Results ==
August 25

Israel	78–84	Slovenia

Glyfada, Athens

August 25

Greece	91–62	Poland

Glyfada, Athens

August 26

Slovenia	86–69	Poland

Glyfada, Athens

August 26

Greece	73–54	Israel

Glyfada, Athens

August 27

Israel	76–80	Poland

Glyfada, Athens

August 27

Greece	76–58	Slovenia

Glyfada, Athens

== Final standings ==
Rank	Team
1st place, gold medalist(s)	Greece
2nd place, silver medalist(s)	Slovenia
3rd place, bronze medalist(s)	Poland
4	Israel

2003 Acropolis International Basketball winners

Greece
Ningth title

Most Valuable Player
(Greece) Nikos Chatzivrettas
