= 1996 Acropolis International Basketball Tournament =

Tournament details
- Arena: OAKA Olympic Indoor Hall; Piraeus, Athens, Greece
- Dates: July 5–7

Final positions
- Champions: Greece (4th title)
- Runners-up: (United States) NIT All Stars
- Third place: Italy
- Fourth place: Germany

Awards and statistics
- MVP: (Greece) Fanis Christodoulou

The 10th Edition of the Acropolis International Basketball Tournament 1996 found between the 5th and 7th. July 1996 in the suburb Marousi from Athens. The total of six games were played in the Olympic Hall.

In addition to the host Greek national team also include the national teams Italy and Germany part. The field of participants completed a selection from the United States. While it was Germany's first participation in the Acropolis tournament, the Italians took part for the sixth time.

The following players took part in the tournament for the German national team:Stephen Arigbabu, André Bade, Vladimir Bogojevič, Patrick Femerling, Jörg Lütcke, Jürgen Malbeck, Tim Nees, Ademola Okulaja, Marko Pešić, Malik Ruddigkeit, Gerrit Terdenge, Drazan Tomic and Denis Wucherer.

== Venues ==
Athens	Greece
Marousi, Athens	1996 Acropolis International Basketball Tournament is located in Greece
Olympic Indoor Hall; Capacity: 18,989	1996 Acropolis International Basketball Tournament is located in Greece

== Participating teams ==
- Germany
- Greece
- Italy
- (United States) NIT All Stars

== Standings ==
Team	Pld	W	L	PF	PA	PD	Pts
Greece	3	3	0	235	184	+51	6
(United States) NIT All Stars	3	2	1	246	248	−2	5
Italy	3	1	2	183	207	−24	4
Germany	3	0	3	225	250	−25	3

== Results ==
July 5

Greece	80–74	Germany

O.A.C.A. Olympic Hall, Marousi, Athens

July 5

NIT All Stars (United States)	78–71	Italy

O.A.C.A. Olympic Hall, Marousi, Athens

July 6

Greece	71–48	Italy

O.A.C.A. Olympic Hall, Marousi, Athens

July 6

NIT All Stars (United States)	106–93	Germany

O.A.C.A. Olympic Hall, Marousi, Athens

July 7

Greece	84–62	(United States) NIT All Stars

O.A.C.A. Olympic Hall, Marousi, Athens

July 7

Germany	58–64	Italy

O.A.C.A. Olympic Hall, Marousi, Athens

== Final standings ==
Rank	Team
1st place, gold medalist(s)	Greece
2nd place, silver medalist(s)	(United States) NIT All Stars
3rd place, bronze medalist(s)	Italy
4	Germany

1996 Acropolis International Basketball winners

Greece
Fourth title

Most Valuable Player
(Greece) Fanis Christodoulou
