= 1990 Acropolis International Basketball Tournament =

Tournament details
- Arena: Glyfada; Athens, Greece
- Dates: July 23–25

Final positions
- Champions: Argentina (1st title)
- Runners-up: Greece
- Third place: Czechoslovakia
- Fourth place: China

The fifth edition of the Acropolis International Basketball Tournament 1990 took place between the 23rd and 25th. July 1990 in Athens. The six games were played for the first time in the sports hall of Glyfada in the south of the Greek capital Athens, Greece. The competition is played under FIBA rules as a round-robin tournament. The participating teams were the hosts, Greece, as well as Argentina, China, and Czechoslovakia.

The field of participants completed the Argentina national team who was able to win the tournament and who is still the only non-European team to win the tournament.

== Venues ==
	Greece
Glyfada, Athens, Greece	1990 Acropolis International Basketball Tournament is located in Greece
Glyfada; Capacity: 2,272	1990 Acropolis International Basketball Tournament is located in Greece

== Participating teams ==
- Argentina
- China
- Czechoslovakia
- Greece

== Standings ==
Team	Pld	W	L	PF	PA	PD	Pts
Argentina	3	3	0	315	239	+76	6
Greece	3	2	1	282	242	+40	5
Czechoslovakia	3	1	2	269	293	−24	4
China	3	0	3	256	348	−92	3

== Results ==
July 23

Greece	103–76	Czechoslovakia

Glyfada, Athens

July 23

Argentina	133–82	China

Glyfada, Athens

July 24

Greece	100–85	China

Glyfada, Athens

July 24

Argentina	101–78	Czechoslovakia

Glyfada, Athens

July 25

Greece	79–81	Argentina

Glyfada, Athens

July 25

Czechoslovakia	115–89	China

Glyfada, Athens

== Final standings ==
Rank	Team
1st place, gold medalist(s)	Argentina
2nd place, silver medalist(s)	Greece
3rd place, bronze medalist(s)	Czechoslovakia
4	China

1990 Acropolis International Basketball winners

Argentina
First title
