= 2000 Acropolis International Basketball Tournament =

Tournament details
- Arena: OAKA Olympic Indoor Hall; Piraeus, Athens, Greece
- Dates: September 1–3

Final positions
- Champions: Greece (7th title)
- Runners-up: Russia
- Third place: Brazil
- Fourth place: Hungary

Awards and statistics
- MVP: (Greece) Fragiskos Alvertis

The 14. Edition of theAcropolis International Basketball Tournament 2000 found between the 1st and 3rd. September 2000 in the suburb Marousi from Athens. The total of six games were played in the Olympic Hall. It takes place before the 2000 Summer Olympics in Australia.

In addition to the host Greek national team also excluded the national teams Russia and Hungary part. The field of participants was completed by the national team from Brazil, which took part in the tournament for the first time.

As MVP the Greek became the tournament Fragiscus Alvertis excellent.

== Venues ==
Athens	Greece
Marousi, Athens	2000 Acropolis International Basketball Tournament is located in Greece
Olympic Indoor Hall; Capacity: 18,989	2000 Acropolis International Basketball Tournament is located in Greece

== Participating teams ==
- Brazil
- Greece
- Hungary
- Russia

== Standings ==
Team	Pld	W	L	PF	PA	PD	Pts
Greece	3	3	0	235	157	+78	6
Russia	3	2	1	238	211	+27	5
Brazil	3	1	2	186	228	−42	4
Hungary	3	0	3	173	236	−63	3

== Results ==
September 1

Russia	93–75	Brazil

O.A.C.A. Olympic Hall, Marousi, Athens

September 1

Greece	86–51	Hungary

O.A.C.A. Olympic Hall, Marousi, Athens

September 2

Russia	80–67	Hungary

O.A.C.A. Olympic Hall, Marousi, Athens

September 2

Greece	80–41	Brazil

O.A.C.A. Olympic Hall, Marousi, Athens

September 3

Brazil	70–55	Hungary

O.A.C.A. Olympic Hall, Marousi, Athens

September 3

Greece	69–65	Russia

O.A.C.A. Olympic Hall, Marousi, Athens

== Final standings ==
Rank	Team
1st place, gold medalist(s)	Greece
2nd place, silver medalist(s)	Russia
3rd place, bronze medalist(s)	Brazil
4	Hungary

2000 Acropolis International Basketball winners

Greece
Seventh title

Most Valuable Player
(Greece) Fragiskos Alvertis
