= 1987 Acropolis International Basketball Tournament =

Tournament details
- Arena: SEF; Piraeus, Athens, Greece
- Dates: May 18–20

Final positions
- Champions: Yugoslavia (2nd title)
- Runners-up: Greece
- Third place: Czechoslovakia
- Fourth place: Canada

Awards and statistics
- MVP: Nikos Galis
- Top scorer(s): (Greece) Nikos Galis (37.3 points per game)

The Acropolis International Tournament 1987 was the second edition of the Acropolis International Basketball Tournament. It was held from May 18 to May 20, 1987, at the SEF arena in Piraeus, Athens, Greece. The competition is played under FIBA rules as a round-robin tournament. The participating teams were the hosts, Greece, as well as Yugoslavia, Canada, and the Czechoslovakia.

The tournament featured famous international basketball players such as Nikos Galis, Dražen Petrović, Vlade Divac, Toni Kukoč, Stanislav Kropilák, Stojko Vranković, Jay Triano, Panagiotis Giannakis and Panagiotis Fasoulas.

== Venues ==
	Greece
Neo Faliro, Piraeus, Greece	1987 Acropolis International Basketball Tournament is located in Greece
SEF; Capacity: 11,640	1987 Acropolis International Basketball Tournament is located in Greece

== Participating teams ==
- Canada
- Czechoslovakia
- Greece
- Yugoslavia

== Standings ==
Team	Pld	W	L	PF	PA	PD	Pts
Yugoslavia	3	3	0	306	256	+50	6
Greece	3	2	1	294	287	+7	5
Czechoslovakia	3	1	2	245	278	−33	4
Canada	3	0	3	274	298	−24	3

== Results ==
May 18

Yugoslavia	101–90	Canada
Scoring by half: 44-33, 57-57

Athens, Greece

May 18

Greece	95–81	Czechoslovakia
Scoring by half: 49-31, 46-50

Athens, Greece

May 19

Greece	111–105	Canada
Scoring by half: 62-48, 49-57

Athens, Greece

May 19

Yugoslavia	104–78	Czechoslovakia
Scoring by half: 56-39, 48-39

Athens, Greece

May 20

Canada	79–86	Czechoslovakia
Scoring by half: 39-41, 40-45

Athens, Greece

May 20

Greece	88–101	Yugoslavia
Scoring by half: 43-60, 45-41

Athens, Greece

== Final standings ==
Rank	Team
1st place, gold medalist(s)	Yugoslavia
2nd place, silver medalist(s)	Greece
3rd place, bronze medalist(s)	Czechoslovakia
4	Canada

1987 Acropolis International Basketball winners

Yugoslavia
Second title

== Statistics ==
First Day:

Yugoslavia - Canada 101-90 (44-33)

YUGOSLAVIA: D. Petrović 22 (1), A. Petrović 6, Kukoč 8, Cvjetičanin 15 (3), Vranković 2, Radovanović 8, Grbović 5, Radović 14 (2), Paspalj 18 (2), Divac 3, Rađa

CANADA: Clarke 2, Pasquale 11 (3), Tilleman 22 (4), Triano 17, Kristmanson 13, Tokarchuk 7, Mungar 13, Karpis 5, Jebbison
Greece - Czechoslovakia 95–81 (49-31)

GREECE: Galis 31, Giannakis 13 (2) Stavropoulos 7 (1), Kambouris 2, Filippou 14, Papadopoulos, Fasoulas 10, Andritsos 6, Romanidis 2, Linardos, Karatzas 6, Ioannou 4

CZECHOSLOVAKIA: Böhm 4, Kropilák 10, Okáč 4, Matický 4, Medvecky 5, Skála 8, Žuffa 17, Rajniak 6, Jelínek 8, Michalko 3 (1), Svitek 13
2nd Day:

Greece - Canada 111–105 (62-48)

GREECE: Galis 36, Giannakis 32 (4), Stavropoulos, Kambouris 2, Filippou 6, Fasoulas 7, Andritsos 6, Linardos 2, Karatzas 6, Romanidis 7, Ioannou 7

CANADA: Clarke 4, Pasquale 18 (2), Tilleman 20 (5), Triano 38 (4), Kristmanson 3, Tokarchuk, Mungar 14, Karpis 6, Biegler, Jebbison, Johansson 2
Yugoslavia - Czechoslovakia 104-78 (56-39)

YUGOSLAVIA: D. Petrović 21, A. Petrović 11 (3), Kukoč 11 (1), Cvjetičanin 7 (1), Vranković 14, Grbović 10 (2), Radović 6 (1), Paspalj 9 (1), Divac 8, Rađa 2, Đorđević 5

CZECHOSLOVAKIA: Kropilák 5, Okáč 18, Matický 12, Medvecky 4, Skála 8, Žuffa 5, Rajniak 4, Jelínek 8, Michalko 5 (1), Svitek 9 (1)
3rd Day:

Canada - Czechoslovakia 79–86 (39-41)

CANADA: Pasquale 5, Tilleman 13 (3), Triano 44 (6), Tokarchuk 2, Mungar 9, Karpis 2, Biegler 2, Morris 2

CZECHOSLOVAKIA: Mašura, Böhm 5, Kropilák 24 (1), Okáč 5, Matický 6, Medvecky 9 (3), Skála, Žuffa 4, Rajniak 16 (2), Jelínek 5 (1), Svitek 12
Greece - Yugoslavia 88-101 (43-60)

GREECE: Galis 45, Giannakis 6 (2), Stavropoulos 5 (1), Kambouris, Filippou 8, Papadopoulos 1, Fasoulas 14, Andritsos 5 (1), Karatzas 1, Pedoulakis 3 (1), Ioannou

YUGOSLAVIA: D. Petrović 37 (6), A. Petrović 8 (2), Kukoč 2, Cvjetičanin 5, Vranković 2, Grbović 30 (6), Paspalj 9 (1), Divac 6, Đorđević 2, Rađa

Top Scorers

Player	Pts.	G	PPG
(Greece) Nikos Galis	112	3	37.3
(Canada) Jay Triano	99	3	33.0
(Socialist Federal Republic of Yugoslavia) Dražen Petrović	80	3	26.7
(Canada) Karl Tilleman	55	3	18.3
(Greece) Panagiotis Giannakis	51	3	17.0
