= 1988 Acropolis International Basketball Tournament =

Acropolis tournament 1988

Tournament details
- Arena: SEF; Piraeus, Athens, Greece
- Dates: June 3–5

Final positions
- Champions: Yugoslavia (3rd title)
- Runners-up: Greece
- Third place: Italy
- Fourth place: (United States) Duke Blue Devils

The Acropolis International Tournament 1988 was the third edition of the Acropolis International Basketball Tournament. It was held from June 3 to 5, 1988, at the SEF arena in Piraeus, Athens, Greece. The competition is played under FIBA rules as a round-robin tournament. The participating teams were the hosts, Greece, as well as Yugoslavia, Italy, and the Duke Blue Devils.

== Venues ==
	Greece
Neo Faliro, Piraeus, Greece	1988 Acropolis International Basketball Tournament is located in Greece
SEF; Capacity: 11,640	1988 Acropolis International Basketball Tournament is located in Greece

== Participating teams ==
- (United States) Duke Blue Devils
- Greece
- Italy
- Yugoslavia

== Standings ==
Team	Pld	W	L	PF	PA	PD	Pts
Yugoslavia	3	3	0	271	261	+10	6
Greece	3	2	1	245	245	0	5
Italy	3	1	2	257	250	+7	4
(United States) Duke Blue Devils	3	0	3	278	295	−17	3

== Results ==
June 3

Yugoslavia	83–82	Italy

SEF, Neo Faliro, Piraeus

June 3

Greece	89–88	(United States) Duke Blue Devils

SEF, Neo Faliro, Piraeus

June 4

Yugoslavia	104–103	(United States) Duke Blue Devils

SEF, Neo Faliro, Piraeus

June 4

Greece	80–73	Italy

SEF, Neo Faliro, Piraeus

June 5

Italy	102–87	(United States) Duke Blue Devils

SEF, Neo Faliro, Piraeus

June 5

Greece	76–84	Yugoslavia
Scoring by half: 37–51, 39–33

SEF, Neo Faliro, Piraeus

== Final standings ==
Rank	Team
1st place, gold medalist(s)	Yugoslavia
2nd place, silver medalist(s)	Greece
3rd place, bronze medalist(s)	Italy
4	(United States) Duke Blue Devils

1988 Acropolis International Basketball winners

Yugoslavia
Third title
