= 2006 Acropolis International Basketball Tournament =

Tournament details
- Arena: OAKA Olympic Indoor Hall; Athens, Greece
- Dates: July 31 – August 2

Final positions
- Champions: Greece (11th title)
- Runners-up: France
- Third place: Croatia
- Fourth place: Italy

Awards and statistics
- MVP: (Greece) Dimitris Diamantidis

The Acropolis International Tournament 2006 was a basketball tournament held in OAKA Indoor Hall in Athens, Greece, from July 31 until August 2, 2006. This was the 20th edition of the Acropolis International Basketball Tournament. The four participating teams were Greece, France, Croatia and Italy.

== Venues ==
Athens	Greece
Marousi, Athens	2006 Acropolis International Basketball Tournament is located in Greece
Olympic Indoor Hall; Capacity: 18,989	2006 Acropolis International Basketball Tournament is located in Greece

== Participating teams ==
- Greece
- Croatia
- France
- Italy

== Standings ==
Team	Pld	W	L	PF	PA	PD	Pts
Greece	3	3	0	219	173	+46	6
France	3	2	1	198	198	0	5
Croatia	3	1	2	196	224	−28	4
Italy	3	0	3	191	209	−18	3

== Results ==
July 31

France	66–59	Italy
Scoring by quarter: 22–16, 14–9, 22–22, 8–12

O.A.C.A. Olympic Hall, Marousi, Athens

July 31

Greece	79–54	Croatia
Scoring by quarter: 19–12, 25–13, 15–12, 20–17

O.A.C.A. Olympic Hall, Marousi, Athens

August 1

Croatia	69–76	France
Scoring by quarter: 19–21, 12–28, 21–9, 17–18

O.A.C.A. Olympic Hall, Marousi, Athens

August 1

Greece	70–63	Italy
Scoring by quarter: 18–8, 11–21, 18–17, 23–17

O.A.C.A. Olympic Hall, Marousi, Athens

August 2

Italy	69–73	Croatia
Scoring by quarter: 7–24, 24–12, 24–14, 14–23

O.A.C.A. Olympic Hall, Marousi, Athens

August 2

Greece	70–56	France
Scoring by quarter: 8–15, 19–14, 22–10, 21–17

O.A.C.A. Olympic Hall, Marousi, Athens

== Final standings ==
Rank	Team
1st place, gold medalist(s)	Greece
2nd place, silver medalist(s)	France
3rd place, bronze medalist(s)	Croatia
4	Italy

2006 Acropolis International Basketball winners

Greece
11th title

Most Valuable Player
Dimitris Diamantidis

== Statistics ==
First Day:

Day 1:

Greece beat Croatia 79–54

19–12, 44–25, 59–37, 79–54.

Greece (21/34 FT, 23/34 (2-p), 4/16 (3-p), 35 rebs, 13 errors, 17 assists, 10 steals, 2 blocks): Kakiouzis 10, Tsartsaris 9(2), Papaloukas 7, Fotsis 8, Hatzivrettas 2, Dikoudis 8 (1), Papadopoulos 16, Diamantidis 3(1), Zisis 4, Mavrokefalidis 2, Spanoulis 4, Vasilopoulos 6.

Croatia (10/16 (FT), 13/34 (2-P), 6/20 (3-P), 30 rebs, 19 errors, 11 assists, 6 steals, 1 block): Ukic 4, Kus 2, Planinic 11(1), Miljkovic 10(2), Tomas 3(1), Longin 2, Prkacin 2, Kasun 10, Markota 2, Vrbac 10(2).

France beat Italy 66–59.

22–16, 36–25, 58–47, 66–59.

France: Gomi 3, Gelebale, Zaneau 5 (1), Fuare, M. Pietrus 11, Parker 23 (1), Diara 5 (1), Pietrus 5, Julian, Diope 2, Petreau 4, Wais 8.

Italy: Di Bella 3 (1), Basile 6 (1), Mancinelli 1, Soragna 2, Marconato 2, Belinelli 14 (3), Pecile 6, Michelori, Guliomaria 4, Mordente 4, Dari 6, Gili 11.

2nd Day:

Greece beat Italy 70–63

18–8, 29–29, 47–46, 70–63.

Greece (15/27 FT's, 23/37 (2-p), 3/10 (3-p), 32 rebs, 19 errors, 12 assist, 9 steals, 3 blocks): Papaloukas 12(1), Kiritsis, Schortsianitis, Spanoulis 7(1), Vasilopoulos, Fotsis 14(2), Hatzivrettas 8, Dikoudis 4, Tsartsaris, Diamantidis 17, Papadopoulos 8, Papamakarios.

Italy (15/27 FT's, 23/37 (2-p), 3/10 (3-p), 29 rebs, 15 errors, 12 assists, 7 steals, 1 blocks): Giaketti 5, Basile 4, Mancinelli 9(1), Soragna 3, Belinelli, Roccha 20, Pecile, Michelori 8, Citantini, Mordende 8(2), Garri 2, Gilliι 4(1).

France beats Croatia 76–69

21–19, 49–31, 58–52,

France: Gomis 5 (1), Gelabale, Bokolo 4, Fuare, M. Pietrus 6, Parker 13, Diara, F. Pietrus 7 (1), Julian 6, Diope 10 (1), Petro 13, Touriaf 12.

Croatia: Ukic 9, Kus 7 (2), Milikovic, Prkacin 4, Tomas 7 (1), Planinic 8, Pasalic, Vrbac 3 (1), Banic 13, Kasun 13, Markota 5 (1).

3rd Day:

Greece – France 70:56

Greece: Spanoulis 11pts (3ast), Fotsis 10pts (4ast), Diamantidis 9pts (4rbds, 4st), Kakiouzis 9pts (4rbds), Schortsianitis 8pts (3st), Papadopoulos 6pts (4 TO, 2bs), Chatzivrettas 6pts, Zisis 6pts (4ast), Dikoudis 4pts (4rbds, 4ast), Tsartsaris 1pt, Papamakarios, Vasilopoulos

France: Parker 20pts (7 TO, 5ast), Diaw 8pts (6rbds, 5 TO), Gelabale 8pts (6rbds), Pietrus 5pts (4rbds), Foirest 5pts, Julian 4pts (3ast), Weis 2pts, Turiaf, Bokolo, Diarra, Jeanneau

Italy – Croatia 69:73

Italy: Di Bella 13pts (5ast), Mordente 12pts (3st), Soragna 9pts (3ast), Basile 9pts, Pecile 8pts, Rocca 7pts, Michelori 7pts, Marconato 4pts (5rbds), Mancinelli, Gigli, Boscagin, Cittadini

Croatia: Kasun 18pts (6rbds), Planinic 17pts (8rbds, 4ast), Ukic 11pts (4ast), Miljkovic 6pts, Longin 6pts (5rbds), Tomas 5pts, Pasalic 4pts (7rbds), Banic 4pts, Markota 2pts (5rbds, 5 TO), Kus, Prkacin, Vrbanc
