= 1992 Acropolis International Basketball Tournament =

Tournament details
- Arena: SEF; Piraeus, Athens, Greece
- Dates: June 8–10

Final positions
- Champions: Greece (2nd title)
- Runners-up: Lithuania
- Third place: Italy
- Fourth place: France

The sixth edition of the Acropolis International Basketball Tournament 1992 took place between the 8th and 10th. June 1992 in Piraeus. The six games were played in the Stadium of Peace and Friendship.

In addition to the host Greece, national team also took out the national teams France and Italy part. The team completed the field of participants Lithuania only a few weeks later with the Olympic Games in Barcelona won the bronze medal. The competition is played under FIBA rules as a round-robin tournament. The stars of the 1992 Acropolis tournament included the Greek Panagiotis Giannakis also Artūras Karnišovas, Rimas Kurtinaitis, Šarūnas Marčiulionis as well Arvydas Sabonis from Lithuania.

== Venues ==
	Greece
Neo Faliro, Piraeus, Greece	1992 Acropolis International Basketball Tournament is located in Greece
SEF; Capacity: 11,640	1992 Acropolis International Basketball Tournament is located in Greece

== Participating teams ==
- France
- Greece
- Italy
- Lithuania

== Standings ==
Team	Pld	W	L	PF	PA	PD	Pts
Greece	3	3	0	223	203	+20	6
Lithuania	3	2	1	306	255	+51	5
Italy	3	1	2	248	272	−24	4
France	3	0	3	216	263	−47	3

== Results ==
June 8

Greece	65–57	France

SEF, Neo Faliro, Piraeus

June 8

Italy	94–116	Lithuania

SEF, Neo Faliro, Piraeus

June 9

Greece	83–81	Lithuania

SEF, Neo Faliro, Piraeus

June 9

Italy	89–81	France

SEF, Neo Faliro, Piraeus

June 10

France	78–109	Lithuania

SEF, Neo Faliro, Piraeus

June 10

Greece	75–65	Italy

SEF, Neo Faliro, Piraeus

== Final standings ==
Rank	Team
1st place, gold medalist(s)	Greece
2nd place, silver medalist(s)	Lithuania
3rd place, bronze medalist(s)	Italy
4	France

1992 Acropolis International Basketball winners

Greece
Second title
