= 2002 Acropolis International Basketball Tournament =

Tournament details
- Arena: OAKA Olympic Indoor Hall; Piraeus, Athens, Greece
- Dates: June 14–16

Final positions
- Champions: Greece (8th title)
- Runners-up: Lithuania
- Third place: Italy
- Fourth place: Croatia

Awards and statistics
- MVP: (Greece) Antonis Fotsis

The 16. Edition of the Acropolis International Basketball Tournament 2002 found between the 14. and 16. June 2002 in the suburbs Marousi from Athens. The total of six games were played in the Olympic Hall.

In addition to the host Greek national team also included the national teams Italy and Lithuania part. The field of participants was completed by the national team Croatia who took part in the tournament for the first time.

In addition to the Greeks, the stars of the 2002 Acropolis tournament included Dimitrios Diamantidis and Theodoros Papaloukas as well as Arvydas Macijauskas and Ramūnas Šiškauskas from Lithuania.

As MVP the Greek became the tournament Antonios Fotsis excellent.

== Venues ==
Athens	Greece
Marousi, Athens	2002 Acropolis International Basketball Tournament is located in Greece
Olympic Indoor Hall; Capacity: 18,989	2002 Acropolis International Basketball Tournament is located in Greece

== Participating teams ==
- Croatia
- Greece
- Italy
- Lithuania

== Standings ==
Team	Pld	W	L	PF	PA	PD	Pts	Tie
Greece	3	2	1	226	181	+45	5	1–1, +32
Lithuania	3	2	1	211	222	−11	5	1–1, -23
Italy	3	2	1	223	216	+7	5	1–1, -9
Croatia	3	0	3	232	273	−41	3	

== Results ==
June 14

Lithuania	94–82	Croatia

O.A.C.A. Olympic Hall, Marousi, Athens

June 14

Greece	64–66	Italy

O.A.C.A. Olympic Hall, Marousi, Athens

June 15

Croatia	71–84	Greece

O.A.C.A. Olympic Hall, Marousi, Athens

June 15

Italy	62–73	Lithuania

O.A.C.A. Olympic Hall, Marousi, Athens

June 16

Croatia	79–95	Italy

O.A.C.A. Olympic Hall, Marousi, Athens

June 16

Greece	78–44	Lithuania

O.A.C.A. Olympic Hall, Marousi, Athens

== Final standings ==
Rank	Team
1st place, gold medalist(s)	Greece
2nd place, silver medalist(s)	Lithuania
3rd place, bronze medalist(s)	Italy
4	Croatia

2002 Acropolis International Basketball winners

Greece
Eighth title

Most Valuable Player
(Greece) Antonis Fotsis
