= 2005 Acropolis International Basketball Tournament =

Tournament details
- Arena: OAKA Olympic Indoor Hall; Athens, Greece
- Dates: September 5–7

Final positions
- Champions: Greece (10th title)
- Runners-up: Serbia and Montenegro
- Third place: Italy
- Fourth place: Germany

Awards and statistics
- MVP: (Greece) Dimitris Diamantidis

The 19. Edition of the Acropolis International Basketball Tournament 2005 found between the 5th and 7th. September 2005 in the suburb Marousi from Athens. The total of six games were played in the Olympic Hall.

In addition to the host Greek national team also exclude the national teams Germany, Italy and Serbia and Montenegro part. While it was Germany's third participation in the Acropolis tournament, the Italians took part for the twelfth and the Serbs for the seventh time.

In addition to Dirk Nowitzki and the Italian, the stars of the 2005 Acropolis tournament included Denis Marconato the Greeks Dimitrios Diamantidis and Theodoros Papaloukas as well as Dejan Bodiroga, Marko Jarić, Dejan Tomašević and Darko Miličić from Serbia and Montenegro.

As MVP Dimitris Diamantidis was honored at the tournament.

== Venues ==
Athens	Greece
Marousi, Athens	2005 Acropolis International Basketball Tournament is located in Greece
Olympic Indoor Hall; Capacity: 18,989	2005 Acropolis International Basketball Tournament is located in Greece

== Participating teams ==
- Germany
- Greece
- Italy
- Serbia and Montenegro

== Standings ==
Team	Pld	W	L	PF	PA	PD	Pts
Greece	3	3	0	264	229	+35	6
Serbia and Montenegro	3	2	1	237	240	−3	5
Italy	3	1	2	262	256	+6	4
Germany	3	0	3	220	258	−38	3

== Results ==
September 5

Greece	91–81	Germany
Scoring by quarter: 32–9, 20–15, 20–27, 19–30

O.A.C.A. Olympic Hall, Marousi, Athens

September 5

Italy	89–95 (OT)	Serbia and Montenegro
Scoring by quarter: 15–27, 24–23, 29–18, 12–12, Overtime: 9–15

O.A.C.A. Olympic Hall, Marousi, Athens

September 6

Greece	91–72	Serbia and Montenegro
Scoring by quarter: 22–26, 24–16, 29–17, 16–13

O.A.C.A. Olympic Hall, Marousi, Athens

September 6

Italy	97–79	Germany
Scoring by quarter: 24–18, 25–11, 27–25, 21–25

O.A.C.A. Olympic Hall, Marousi, Athens

September 7

Greece	82–76	Italy
Scoring by quarter: 30–25, 21–12, 13–20, 18–19

O.A.C.A. Olympic Hall, Marousi, Athens

September 7

Germany	60–70	Serbia and Montenegro
Scoring by quarter: 10–19, 21–15, 18–21, 11–15

O.A.C.A. Olympic Hall, Marousi, Athens

== Final standings ==
Rank	Team
1st place, gold medalist(s)	Greece
2nd place, silver medalist(s)	Serbia and Montenegro
3rd place, bronze medalist(s)	Italy
4	Germany

2005 Acropolis International Basketball winners

Greece
Tenth title

Most Valuable Player
(Greece) Dimitris Diamantidis
