= 1989 Acropolis International Basketball Tournament =

Tournament details
- Arena: SEF; Piraeus, Athens, Greece
- Dates: June 3–5

Final positions
- Champions: Greece (1st title)
- Runners-up: Italy
- Third place: (United States) A.C.C
- Fourth place: Netherlands

The fourth edition of the Acropolis International Basketball Tournament 1989 took place between the 3rd and 5th. June 1989 in Piraeus. The six games were played at the SEF arena in Piraeus, Athens, Greece. The competition is played under FIBA rules as a round-robin tournament. The participating teams were the hosts, Greece, as well as Italy, Netherlands, and selection of university players Atlantic Coast Conference from the United States.

== Venues ==
| | Greece |
|---|---|
| Neo Faliro, Piraeus, Greece | 1989 Acropolis International Basketball Tournament is located in Greece |
| SEF; Capacity: 11,640 | 1989 Acropolis International Basketball Tournament is located in Greece |

== Participating teams ==
- (United States) Atlantic Coast Conference
- Greece
- Italy
- Netherlands

== Standings ==
| Team | Pld | W | L | PF | PA | PD | Pts |
|---|---|---|---|---|---|---|---|
| Greece | 3 | 3 | 0 | 263 | 220 | +43 | 6 |
| Italy | 3 | 2 | 1 | 272 | 251 | +21 | 5 |
| (United States) A.C.C | 3 | 1 | 2 | 205 | 207 | −2 | 4 |
| Netherlands | 3 | 0 | 3 | 237 | 289 | −52 | 3 |

== Results ==
June 3

| Greece | 82–59 | Netherlands |

SEF, Neo Faliro, Piraeus

June 3

| Italy | 106–83 | (United States) A.C.C |

SEF, Neo Faliro, Piraeus

June 4

| Greece | 88–81 | (United States) A.C.C |

SEF, Neo Faliro, Piraeus

June 4

| Italy | 86–75 | Netherlands |

SEF, Neo Faliro, Piraeus

June 5

| Greece | 93–80 | Italy |

SEF, Neo Faliro, Piraeus

June 5

| A.C.C (United States) | 121–103 | Netherlands |

SEF, Neo Faliro, Piraeus

== Final standings ==
| Rank | Team |
|---|---|
| 1st place, gold medalist(s) | Greece |
| 2nd place, silver medalist(s) | Italy |
| 3rd place, bronze medalist(s) | (United States) A.C.C |
| 4 | Netherlands |

1989 Acropolis International Basketball winners

Greece
First title
