= Greek Basketball League Hall of Fame =

- Established: 2022
- Location: Athens, Greece
- Type: Hall of Fame
- Website: Official website

The Greek Basketball League Hall of Fame, or Hellenic Basketball Association (HEBA) Hall of Fame (Greek: Ελληνικό Μπάσκετ Λιγκ Χολ οφ Φέιμ), is a Hall of Fame (HOF) that recognizes and honors the best basketball players and head coaches in the history of Greece's top-tier level professional club league, the Greek Basketball League (GBL). Players and head coaches are nominated for the honor, by the governing body of the Greek Basketball League, the Hellenic Basketball Association (HEBA).

The hall's inaugural class, was inducted on 18 December 2022.

== History ==
The Greek Basketball League Hall of Fame's first class was inducted in a ceremony that took place at the Nikos Galis OAKA Indoor Hall, in Marousi, Athens, in December 2022. It took place during the 2022 HEBA Greek All-Star Game weekend. The hall's first class included a total of thirty players and three head coaches.

== Inductees ==
=== Players ===
*	Member of the Naismith Memorial Basketball Hall of Fame
**	Member of the FIBA Hall of Fame
***	Member of both the Naismith and FIBA Halls of Fame

- (Listed by induction year, and in alphabetical order)

Induction Year	Greek Basketball League Hall of Fame Player	Also Member Of / Candidate Of	Ref.
2022
2022	(Greece) Fragiskos Alvertis		
2022	(United States) Mike Batiste		
2022	(United States) Walter Berry		
2022	(Serbia) Dejan Bodiroga	FIBA Hall of Fame Candidate	
2022	(Greece) Nikos Chatzivrettas		
2022	(Greece) Fanis Christodoulou	FIBA Hall of Fame Candidate	
2022	(Greece) Dimitris Diamantidis	EuroLeague Hall of Fame	
2022	(Greece) Dimos Dikoudis		
2022	(Greece) Panos Fasoulas**	FIBA Hall of Fame	
2022	(United States) Alphonso Ford	Basketball Hall of Fame Candidate	
2022	(Greece) Antonis Fotsis		
2022	(Greece) / (United States) Nikos Galis***	Basketball Hall of Fame, FIBA Hall of Fame	
2022	(Greece) Panagiotis Giannakis**	Basketball Hall of Fame Candidate, FIBA Hall of Fame	
2022	(Greece) Angelos Koronios		
2022	(Greece) Nikos Oikonomou		
2022	(Greece) Theo Papaloukas	EuroLeague Hall of Fame	
2022	(Serbia) Žarko Paspalj	FIBA Hall of Fame Candidate	
2022	(Serbia) / (Greece) Bane Prelević		
2022	(Greece) Georgios Printezis		
2022	(Croatia) Dino Rađja*	Basketball Hall of Fame, FIBA Hall of Fame Candidate	
2022	(Greece) Efthymis Rentzias		
2022	(United States) David Rivers		
2022	(Serbia) Zoran Savić		
2022	(Greece) Sofoklis Schortsanitis		
2022	(Greece) Vassilis Spanoulis	EuroLeague Hall of Fame	
2022	(Serbia) / (Greece) Peja Stojaković**	FIBA Hall of Fame	
2022	(United States) Roy Tarpley		
2022	(Croatia) Stojko Vranković		
2022	(United States) Dominique Wilkins*	Basketball Hall of Fame	
2022	(Greece) Nikos Zisis		
2023
2023	(Greece) Ioannis Bourousis		
2023	(Greece) / (United States) Jon Korfas		

=== Head coaches ===
*	Member of the Naismith Memorial Basketball Hall of Fame
**	Member of the FIBA Hall of Fame
***	Member of both the Naismith and FIBA Halls of Fame

- (Listed by induction year, and in alphabetical order)

Induction Year	Greek Basketball League Hall of Fame Coach	Also Member Of / Candidate Of	Ref.
2022
2022	(Greece) Giannis Ioannidis		
2022	(Serbia) Dušan Ivković**	Basketball Hall of Fame Candidate, FIBA Hall of Fame, EuroLeague Hall of Fame	
2022	(Serbia) Željko Obradović	FIBA Hall of Fame Candidate	
2023
2023	(Greece) Soulis Markopoulos		

== See also ==
- College Basketball Hall of Fame
- Basketball Hall of Fame
  - List of members of the Naismith Memorial Basketball Hall of Fame
  - List of players in the Naismith Memorial Basketball Hall of Fame
  - List of coaches in the Naismith Memorial Basketball Hall of Fame
- FIBA Hall of Fame
  - List of members of the FIBA Hall of Fame
- EuroLeague Hall of Fame
- Italian Basketball Hall of Fame
- VTB United League Hall of Fame
- French Basketball Hall of Fame
- Finnish Basketball Hall of Fame
- Australian Basketball Hall of Fame
- Spanish Basketball Hall of Fame
- Philippine Basketball Association Hall of Fame
- Women's Basketball Hall of Fame
