= 1999 Acropolis International Basketball Tournament =

Tournament details
- Arena: SEF; Piraeus, Athens, Greece
- Dates: June 9–11

Final positions
- Champions: Greece (6th title)
- Runners-up: Italy
- Third place: Australia
- Fourth place: Russia

Awards and statistics
- MVP: (Greece) Giorgos Sigalas

The 13. Edition of the Acropolis International Basketball Tournament 1999 found between the 9th and 11th. June 1999 in Piraeus. The six games were played for the last time Stadium of Peace and Friendship. Athens has always hosted the tournament since 2000.

In addition to the host Greek national team the national teams from Australia also took part Russia part. The team completed the field of participants Italy, which took part in the Acropolis tournament for the seventh time and just a few weeks later in the European Championships in France won the gold medal.

As MVP the Greek Georgios Sigalas was honored at the tournament.

== Venues ==
	Greece
Neo Faliro, Piraeus, Greece	1999 Acropolis International Basketball Tournament is located in Greece
SEF; Capacity: 11,640	1999 Acropolis International Basketball Tournament is located in Greece

== Participating teams ==
- Australia
- Greece
- Italy
- Russia

== Standings ==
Team	Pld	W	L	PF	PA	PD	Pts
Greece	3	3	0	216	187	+29	6
Italy	3	2	1	241	244	−3	5
Australia	3	1	2	228	220	+8	4
Russia	3	0	3	214	248	−34	3

== Results ==
June 9

Russia	60–81	Australia

SEF, Neo Faliro, Piraeus

June 9

Greece	77–53	Italy

SEF, Neo Faliro, Piraeus

June 10

Greece	68–64	Australia

SEF, Neo Faliro, Piraeus

June 10

Russia	84–96	Italy

SEF, Neo Faliro, Piraeus

June 11

Italy	92–83	Australia

SEF, Neo Faliro, Piraeus

June 11

Greece	71–70	Russia

SEF, Neo Faliro, Piraeus

== Final standings ==
Rank	Team
1st place, gold medalist(s)	Greece
2nd place, silver medalist(s)	Italy
3rd place, bronze medalist(s)	Australia
4	Russia

1999 Acropolis International Basketball winners

Greece
Sixth title

Most Valuable Player
(Greece) Giorgos Sigalas
