= 1994 Acropolis International Basketball Tournament =

Tournament details
- Arena: SEF; Piraeus, Athens, Greece
- Dates: July 13–17

Final positions
- Champions: FR Yugoslavia (1st title)
- Runners-up: Russia
- Third place: Greece
- Fourth place: Italy

The eleventh edition of the Acropolis International Basketball Tournament 1994 found between the 13th and 17th. June 1994 in Piraeus. The total of ten games were played at Stadium of Peace and Friendship.

In addition to the host Greece also included the national teams FR Yugoslavia, Russia, Argentina as well as Italy. While it was Argentina's first and Russians' second participation in the Acropolis tournament, the Italians took part for the fifth time and the Serbs for the fourth time.

The 1994 Acropolis tournament is the only one so far in which five teams took part instead of the usual four.

== Venues ==
	Greece
Neo Faliro, Piraeus, Greece	1994 Acropolis International Basketball Tournament is located in Greece
SEF; Capacity: 11,640	1994 Acropolis International Basketball Tournament is located in Greece

== Participating teams ==
- Argentina
- Greece
- FR Yugoslavia
- Italy
- Russia

== Standings ==
Team	Pld	W	L	PF	PA	PD	Pts
FR Yugoslavia	4	3	1	360	328	+32	7
Russia	4	3	1	313	299	+14	7
Greece	4	3	1	296	292	+4	7
Italy	4	1	3	293	318	−25	5
Argentina	4	0	4	292	317	−25	4

== Results ==
July 13

Greece	73–70	Russia

SEF, Neo Faliro, Piraeus

July 13

Italy	91–96	FR Yugoslavia

SEF, Neo Faliro, Piraeus

July 14

Greece	78–69	Argentina

SEF, Neo Faliro, Piraeus

July 14

Italy	67–72	Russia

SEF, Neo Faliro, Piraeus

July 15

Russia	92–86	FR Yugoslavia

SEF, Neo Faliro, Piraeus

July 15

Italy	73–70	Argentina

SEF, Neo Faliro, Piraeus

July 16

Greece	80–62	Italy

SEF, Neo Faliro, Piraeus

July 16

Argentina	80–87	FR Yugoslavia

SEF, Neo Faliro, Piraeus

July 17

Greece	65–91	FR Yugoslavia

SEF, Neo Faliro, Piraeus

July 17

Russia	79–73	Argentina

SEF, Neo Faliro, Piraeus

== Final standings ==
Rank	Team
1st place, gold medalist(s)	FR Yugoslavia
2nd place, silver medalist(s)	Russia
3rd place, bronze medalist(s)	Greece
4	Italy
5	Argentina

1994 Acropolis International Basketball winners

FR Yugoslavia
Fourth title
