= 1995 Acropolis International Basketball Tournament =

Tournament details
- Arena: OAKA Olympic Indoor Hall; Piraeus, Athens, Greece
- Dates: June 8–10

Final positions
- Champions: FR Yugoslavia (5th title)
- Runners-up: Greece
- Third place: (United States) College NCAA DI All Stars
- Fourth place: Slovenia

The 10. Edition of the Acropolis International Basketball Tournament 1995 found between the 8th and 10th. June 1995 in the suburb Marousi from Athens. The total of six games were played for the first time in OAKA Olympic Indoor Hall.

In addition to the host Greek national team also take the national teams from Slovenia and a selection from the United States part. The field of participants completed the FR Yugoslavia just weeks later at the 1995 European Championships in Greece was able to achieve the gold medal.

In addition to the Greek, the stars of the 1995 Acropolis tournament included Panagiotis Giannakis and the Yugoslavs Dejan Bodiroga and Predrag Danilović.

== Venues ==
Athens	Greece
Marousi, Athens	1995 Acropolis International Basketball Tournament is located in Greece
Olympic Indoor Hall; Capacity: 18,989	1995 Acropolis International Basketball Tournament is located in Greece

== Participating teams ==
- (United States) College NCAA DI All Stars
- Greece
- FR Yugoslavia
- Slovenia

== Standings ==
Team	Pld	W	L	PF	PA	PD	Pts
FR Yugoslavia	3	3	0	242	200	+42	6
Greece	3	2	1	235	230	+5	5
(United States) NCAA DI All Stars	3	1	2	228	251	−23	4
Slovenia	3	0	3	237	261	−24	3

== Results ==
June 8

Greece	82–73	Slovenia

O.A.C.A. Olympic Hall, Marousi, Athens

June 8

NCAA DI All Stars (United States)	57–77	FR Yugoslavia

O.A.C.A. Olympic Hall, Marousi, Athens

June 9

Greece	91–85	(United States) NCAA DI All Stars

O.A.C.A. Olympic Hall, Marousi, Athens

June 9

Slovenia	81–93	FR Yugoslavia

O.A.C.A. Olympic Hall, Marousi, Athens

June 10

Greece	62– 72	FR Yugoslavia

O.A.C.A. Olympic Hall, Marousi, Athens

June 10

Slovenia	83–86	(United States) NCAA DI All Stars

O.A.C.A. Olympic Hall, Marousi, Athens

== Final standings ==
Rank	Team
1st place, gold medalist(s)	FR Yugoslavia
2nd place, silver medalist(s)	Greece
3rd place, bronze medalist(s)	(United States) College NCAA DI All Stars
4	Slovenia

1995 Acropolis International Basketball winners

FR Yugoslavia
Fifth title
