= Barry Mungar =

Canadian basketball player

Personal information
- Born: November 4, 1961 (age 65) Ottawa, Ontario, Canada
- Listed height: 6 ft 8 in (2.03 m)
- Listed weight: 220 lb (100 kg)

Career information
- High school: Highland (Dundas, Ontario)
- College: St. Bonaventure (1981–1986)
- NBA draft: 1986: 4th round, 82nd overall pick
- Drafted by: Washington Bullets
- Position: Power forward

Career history
- 1986–1987: Livorno

Career highlights
- First-team All-Atlantic 10 (1986)
- Stats at Basketball Reference

Barry Mungar (born November 4, 1961) is a Canadian former professional basketball player. Following his college career at St. Bonaventure, he went on to play professionally in Europe. He was a key member of the Canadian national team in the late 80's, appearing with the team in several major tournaments, including the 1988 Summer Olympics in Seoul.

== Basketball career ==
Born in Ottawa, Ontario, Mungar attended Highland Secondary School in Dundas, Ontario, in the late 1970s where he starred at basketball. In 1981, he joined St. Bonaventure but suffered a back injury early in the season and missed all but two games. During his final season with St. Bonaventure, he averaged 17.1 points and 8.0 rebounds and was named to the All-Atlantic 10 Conference First-Team. Following his college career, he was drafted in the fourth round of the 1986 NBA draft, taken 82nd overall by the Washington Bullets. After not making it to the final roster, Mungar left for Europe where he played professionally in Italy.

=== National team career ===
Mungar participated with the Canadian national team at the 1986 FIBA World Championship, the 1987 Acropolis International Basketball Tournament, the 1988 Tournament of the Americas (FIBA AmeriCup) and in the 1988 Summer Olympics in Seoul.

== Personal life ==
Following his basketball career, Mungar worked as a constable with the Hamilton Police.

His daughter, Reece Mungar, played college basketball for Northern Kentucky University and University of Guelph.
