= 2008 Acropolis International Basketball Tournament =

Basketball tournament

Tournament details
- Arena: OAKA Olympic Indoor Hall; Athens, Greece
- Dates: July 7-9

Final positions
- Champions: Greece (13th title)
- Runners-up: Brazil
- Third place: Croatia
- Fourth place: Australia

Awards and statistics
- MVP: (Greece) Antonis Fotsis
- Top scorer(s): (Greece) Vassilis Spanoulis (15.3 points per game)

The Acropolis International Tournament 2008 was a basketball tournament held in OAKA Indoor Hall in Athens, Greece, from July 7 until July 9, 2008. This was the 22nd edition of the Acropolis International Basketball Tournament. The four participating teams were Greece, Croatia, Brazil and Australia.

== Venues ==
Athens	Greece
Marousi, Athens	2008 Acropolis International Basketball Tournament is located in Greece
Olympic Indoor Hall; Capacity: 18,989	2008 Acropolis International Basketball Tournament is located in Greece

== Participating teams ==
- Australia
- Brazil
- Croatia
- Greece

== Standings ==
Team	Pld	W	L	PF	PA	PD	Pts
Greece	3	3	0	238	198	+40	6
Brazil	3	1	2	235	238	−3	4
Croatia	3	1	2	212	232	−20	4
Australia	3	1	2	227	244	−17	4

== Results ==
July 7

Australia	69–71	Croatia

O.A.C.A. Olympic Hall, Marousi, Athens

July 7

Greece	72–65	Brazil

O.A.C.A. Olympic Hall, Marousi, Athens

July 8

Brazil	86–77	Croatia

O.A.C.A. Olympic Hall, Marousi, Athens

July 8

Australia	69–89	Greece

O.A.C.A. Olympic Hall, Marousi, Athens

July 9

Brazil	84–89	Australia

O.A.C.A. Olympic Hall, Marousi, Athens

July 9

Greece	77–64	Croatia

O.A.C.A. Olympic Hall, Marousi, Athens

== Final standing ==
Rank	Team
1st place, gold medalist(s)	Greece
2nd place, silver medalist(s)	Brazil
3rd place, bronze medalist(s)	Croatia
4	Australia

2008 Acropolis International Basketball winners

Greece
13th title

Most Valuable Player
Antonis Fotsis
