= 1998 Acropolis International Basketball Tournament =

12th edition of the tournament

Tournament details
- Arena: OAKA Olympic Indoor Hall; Piraeus, Athens, Greece
- Dates: July 19–21

Final positions
- Champions: Greece (5th title)
- Runners-up: (United States) College NCAA DI All Stars
- Third place: Poland
- Fourth place: Japan

Awards and statistics
- MVP: (Greece) Efthimios Rentzias

The 12th edition of the Acropolis International Basketball Tournament 1998 was held between the 19 and 21 July 1998 in the suburb Marousi, Athens. The total of six games were played in the Olympic Hall.

In addition to the host Greek national team the national teams from Poland and Japan also took part. The field of participants completed one NCAA-Selection from the United States. For Japan and Poland, the 1998 Acropolis tournament was the first participation in the competition.

== Venues ==
Athens	Greece
Marousi, Athens	1998 Acropolis International Basketball Tournament is located in Greece
Olympic Indoor Hall; Capacity: 18,989	1998 Acropolis International Basketball Tournament is located in Greece

== Participating teams ==
- (United States) College NCAA DI All Stars
- Greece
- Japan
- Poland

== Standings ==
Team	Pld	W	L	PF	PA	PD	Pts
Greece	3	3	0	264	144	+120	6
(United States) NCAA DI All Stars	3	2	1	209	227	−18	5
Poland	3	1	2	175	222	−47	4
Japan	3	0	3	189	244	−55	3

== Results ==
July 19

Greece	98–49	Japan

O.A.C.A. Olympic Hall, Marousi, Athens

July 19

Poland	70–73	(United States) NCAA DI All Stars

O.A.C.A. Olympic Hall, Marousi, Athens

July 20

Greece	88–39	Poland

O.A.C.A. Olympic Hall, Marousi, Athens

July 20

NCAA DI All Stars (United States)	80–79	Japan

O.A.C.A. Olympic Hall, Marousi, Athens

July 21

Greece	78–56	(United States) NCAA DI All Stars

O.A.C.A. Olympic Hall, Marousi, Athens

July 21

Poland	66–61	Japan

O.A.C.A. Olympic Hall, Marousi, Athens

== Final standings ==
Rank	Team
1st place, gold medalist(s)	Greece
2nd place, silver medalist(s)	(United States) College NCAA DI All Stars
3rd place, bronze medalist(s)	Poland
4	Japan

1998 Acropolis International Basketball winners

Greece
Fifth title

Most Valuable Player
(Greece) Efthimios Rentzias
