= 1993 Acropolis International Basketball Tournament =

Tournament details
- Arena: SEF; Piraeus, Athens, Greece
- Dates: June 9–11

Final positions
- Champions: Greece (3rd title)
- Runners-up: Bulgaria
- Third place: Russia
- Fourth place: (United States) College NCAA DI All Stars

The seventh edition of the Acropolis International Basketball Tournament 1993 found between the 9th and 11th. June 1993 in Piraeus. The total of six games were played Stadium of Peace and Friendship.

In addition to the host Greece national team also included the national teams Bulgaria and a selection of college players from the United States. The competition is played under FIBA rules as a round-robin tournament. The field of participants completed the Russia national team just weeks later at the 1993 European Championships in Germany was able to achieve the silver medal.

== Venues ==
	Greece
Neo Faliro, Piraeus, Greece	1993 Acropolis International Basketball Tournament is located in Greece
SEF; Capacity: 11,640	1993 Acropolis International Basketball Tournament is located in Greece

== Participating teams ==
- Bulgaria
- (United States) College NCAA DI All Stars
- Greece
- Russia

== Standings ==
Team	Pld	W	L	PF	PA	PD	Pts
Greece	3	3	0	277	222	+55	6
Bulgaria	3	2	1	253	249	+4	5
Russia	3	1	2	251	277	−26	4
(United States) NCAA DI All Stars	3	0	3	210	243	−33	3

== Results ==
June 9

Greece	95–81	Bulgaria

SEF, Neo Faliro, Piraeus

June 9

Russia	84–82	(United States) NCAA DI All Stars

SEF, Neo Faliro, Piraeus

June 10

Greece	108–89	Russia

SEF, Neo Faliro, Piraeus

June 10

Bulgaria	85–76	(United States) NCAA DI All Stars

SEF, Neo Faliro, Piraeus

June 11

Greece	74–52	(United States) NCAA DI All Stars

SEF, Neo Faliro, Piraeus

June 11

Bulgaria	87–78	Russia

SEF, Neo Faliro, Piraeus

== Final standings ==
Rank	Team
1st place, gold medalist(s)	Greece
2nd place, silver medalist(s)	Bulgaria
3rd place, bronze medalist(s)	Russia
4	(United States) College NCAA DI All Stars

1993 Acropolis International Basketball winners

Greece
Third title
