= 2001 Acropolis International Basketball Tournament =

Tournament details
- Arena: OAKA Olympic Indoor Hall; Piraeus, Athens, Greece
- Dates: August 21–23

Final positions
- Champions: Italy (2nd title)
- Runners-up: Greece
- Third place: FR Yugoslavia
- Fourth place: Lithuania

Awards and statistics
- MVP: (Italy) Gregor Fučka

The 15. Edition of the Acropolis International Basketball Tournament 2001 took place between the 21st and 23rd. August 2001 in the suburb Marousi from Athens. The total of six games were played in the Olympic Hall.

In addition to the host Greek national team also included the national teams Italy and Lithuania part. The field of participants was completed by the national team FR Yugoslavia, which only a few weeks later at the European Championships in Turkey was able to win the gold medal.

In addition to the Greek, the stars of the 2001 Acropolis tournament included Theodoros Papaloukas the Yugoslavs Dejan Bodiroga, Marko Jarić, and Peja Stojaković, Denis Marconato from Italy as well Šarūnas Jasikevičius, Ramūnas Šiškauskas and Darius Songaila from Lithuania.

As MVP the Italian was the tournament Gregor Fučka excellent.

== Venues ==
Athens	Greece
Marousi, Athens	2001 Acropolis International Basketball Tournament is located in Greece
Olympic Indoor Hall; Capacity: 18,989	2001 Acropolis International Basketball Tournament is located in Greece

== Participating teams ==
- Greece
- FR Yugoslavia
- Italy
- Lithuania

== Standings ==
Team	Pld	W	L	PF	PA	PD	Pts
Italy	3	2	1	207	208	−1	5
Greece	3	2	1	212	201	+11	5
FR Yugoslavia	3	1	2	221	220	+1	4
Lithuania	3	1	2	229	240	−11	4

== Results ==
August 21

FR Yugoslavia	96–81	Lithuania

O.A.C.A. Olympic Hall, Marousi, Athens

August 21

Italy	70–66	Greece

O.A.C.A. Olympic Hall, Marousi, Athens

August 22

Lithuania	75–69	Italy

O.A.C.A. Olympic Hall, Marousi, Athens

August 22

Greece	71–58	FR Yugoslavia

O.A.C.A. Olympic Hall, Marousi, Athens

August 23

Italy	68–67	FR Yugoslavia

O.A.C.A. Olympic Hall, Marousi, Athens

August 23

Greece	75–73	Lithuania

O.A.C.A. Olympic Hall, Marousi, Athens

== Final standings ==
Rank	Team
1st place, gold medalist(s)	Italy
2nd place, silver medalist(s)	Greece
3rd place, bronze medalist(s)	FR Yugoslavia
4	Lithuania

2001 Acropolis International Basketball winners

Italy
Second title

Most Valuable Player
(Italy) Gregor Fučka
