= 1997 Acropolis International Basketball Tournament =

Tournament details
- Arena: SEF; Piraeus, Athens, Greece
- Dates: June 12–14

Final positions
- Champions: Italy (1st title)
- Runners-up: Greece
- Third place: France
- Fourth place: Germany

Awards and statistics
- MVP: (Italy) Carlton Myers

The 11. Edition of the Acropolis International Basketball Tournament 1997 found between the 12th and 14th. June 1997 in Piraeus. The total of six games were played Stadium of Peace and Friendship.

In addition to the host Greek national team also excluded the national teams Germany, France as well as Italy part. While it was the second participation in the Acropolis tournament for Germany (after 1996) and France, the Italians took part for the seventh time and won the tournament for the first time.

== Venues ==
	Greece
Neo Faliro, Piraeus, Greece	1997 Acropolis International Basketball Tournament is located in Greece
SEF; Capacity: 11,640	1997 Acropolis International Basketball Tournament is located in Greece

== Participating teams ==
- France
- Germany
- Greece
- Italy

== Standings ==
Team	Pld	W	L	PF	PA	PD	Pts
Italy	3	3	0	224	189	+35	6
Greece	3	2	1	242	219	+23	5
France	3	1	2	211	231	−20	4
Germany	3	0	3	199	237	−38	3

== Results ==
June 12

Italy	71–56	France

SEF, Neo Faliro, Piraeus

June 12

Greece	83–65	Germany

SEF, Neo Faliro, Piraeus

June 13

Italy	69–56	Germany

SEF, Neo Faliro, Piraeus

June 13

Greece	82–70	France

SEF, Neo Faliro, Piraeus

June 14

Germany	78–85	France

SEF, Neo Faliro, Piraeus

June 14

Italy	84–77	Greece

SEF, Neo Faliro, Piraeus

== Final standings ==
Rank	Team
1st place, gold medalist(s)	Italy
2nd place, silver medalist(s)	Greece
3rd place, bronze medalist(s)	France
4	Germany

1997 Acropolis International Basketball winners

Italy
First title

Most Valuable Player
(Italy) Carlton Myers
