= Christos Christodoulou =

Greek basketball player

Personal information
- Born: August 13, 1961 (age 65) Dafni, Athens, Greece
- Listed height: 6 ft 6.75 in (2.00 m)
- Listed weight: 240 lb (109 kg)

Career information
- NBA draft: 1983: undrafted
- Playing career: 1979–2000
- Position: Small forward / power forward
- Number: 12

Career history
- 1979–1994: Panionios
- 1994–2000: Sporting

Career highlights
- As player: Greek Cup winner (1991)

Christos Christodoulou (Greek: Χρήστος "Κρις" Χριστοδούλου; born August 13, 1961) is a Greek former professional basketball player. At a height of 2.00 m (6 ft 6 3/4 in) tall, he played at the small forward and power forward positions.

== Professional career ==
After playing with the youth teams of Dafni, Christodoulou played at the senior level with Panionios, with whom he won the Greek Cup title in 1991. In 1994, he moved to Sporting.

== National team career ==
Christodoulou was a member of the senior men's Greek national basketball team that finished in 10th place at the 1986 FIBA World Championship.

== Post-playing career ==
After he retired from playing professional basketball, Christodoulou worked as the sports manager of the Greek Basket League club Panionios.

== Personal life ==
Christodoulou's younger brother, Fanis, was also a professional basketball player. They played together in the same club team, Panionios. His daughters, Elena and Stella, are professional volleyball players.
