= Panagiotis Karatzas (basketball) =

Greek professional basketball player

Personal information
- Born: June 29, 1965 (age 61) Athens, Greece
- Listed height: 6 ft 8.75 in (2.05 m)
- Listed weight: 245 lb (111 kg)

Career information
- Playing career: 1979–1996
- Position: Power forward / center
- Number: 9

Career history
- 1979–1990: Pagrati
- 1990–1994: Olympiacos
- 1994–1995: Panionios
- 1995–1996: Pagrati

Career highlights
- 2× Greek League champion (1993, 1994); Greek Cup winner (1994)
Medals
Men's basketball
Representing Greece
FIBA EuroBasket
Gold medal – first place	1987 Greece

Panagiotis Karatzas (Greek: Παναγιώτης Καρατζάς; born June 29, 1965) is a Greek former professional basketball player.

== Professional career ==
During his pro club career, Karatzas was an important member of the Greek club Pagrati Athens, where he played from 1979 to 1990. After that, he played with the Greek club Olympiacos Piraeus, from 1990 to 1994. With Olympiacos, he won the Greek League championship in 1993 and 1994, and the Greek Cup title in 1994. He played with the Greek club Panionios Athens, during the 1994–95 season. In 1995, he returned to Pagrati.

== National team career ==
Karatzas was a member of the senio Greek national team. He played with Greece at the 1986 FIBA World Championship. He was also a member of the Greek team that won the gold medal at the 1987 FIBA EuroBasket.
