= Nikos Chatzivrettas =

Greek basketball player (born 1977)

Nikos Chatzivrettas Νίκος Χατζηβρέττας
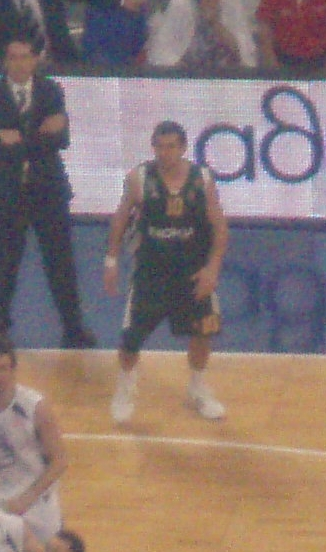
- Chatzivrettas with Panathinaikos.

Personal information
- Born: 26 May 1977 (age 49) Thessaloniki, Greece
- Listed height: 6 ft 5.75 in (1.97 m)
- Listed weight: 210 lb (95 kg)

Career information
- NBA draft: 1999: undrafted
- Playing career: 1997–2011
- Position: Shooting guard / small forward

Career history
- 1997–2002: Iraklis
- 2002–2003: CSKA Moscow
- 2003–2009: Panathinaikos
- 2009–2011: Aris

Career highlights
- 2× EuroLeague champion (2007, 2009); 2× Triple Crown winner (2007, 2009); FIBA EuroStar (2007); 6× Greek League champion (2004, 2005, 2006, 2007, 2008, 2009); 5× Greek Cup winner (2005, 2006, 2007, 2008, 2009); Greek League Finals MVP (2004); Greek League Top Scorer (2002); 3× Greek All-Star (2001, 2002, 2004); Greek League Hall of Fame (2022); Russian Championship champion (2003); 2× Acropolis Tournament MVP (2003, 2004)
Medals
Event	1st	2nd	3rd
FIBA World Cup	0	1	0
FIBA Stanković World Cup	1	0	0
FIBA EuroBasket	1	0	0
Total	2	1	0
Men's basketball
Representing Greece
FIBA World Cup
Silver medal – second place	2006 Japan	
FIBA Stanković World Cup
Gold medal – first place	2006 China	
FIBA EuroBasket
Gold medal – first place	2005 Serbia & Montenegro	

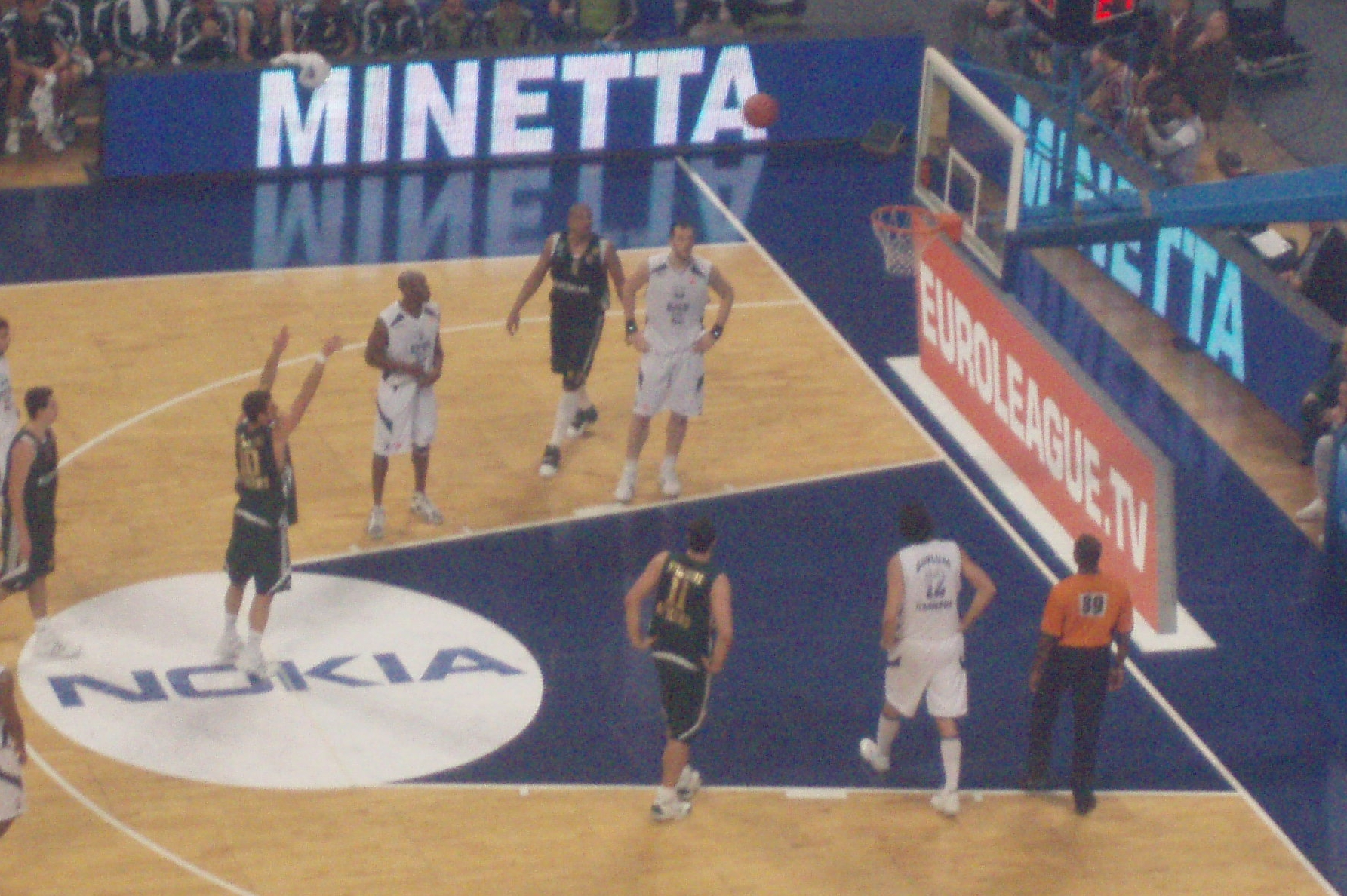
Nikos Chatzivrettas taking a free throw vs. Efes.

Nikolaos (Nikos) Chatzivrettas (alternate spelling: Hatzivrettas) (Greek: Νικόλαος (Νίκος) Χατζηβρέττας; born 26 May 1977) is a retired Greek professional basketball player. At a height of 1.97 m (6 ft 5 3/4 in) tall, he played at the shooting guard and small forward positions. He was inducted into the Greek Basket League Hall of Fame in 2022.

== Professional career ==
Before signing with Aris, Chatzivrettas played with Aias Evosmou, Iraklis, CSKA Moscow, and Panathinaikos. He won the EuroLeague championship with Panathinaikos in 2007 and 2009. In July 2009, he joined "The Emperor" of Greek basketball, Aris Thessaloniki.

He left Aris at the end of 2011, after his contract ended, and he eventually retired from professional club basketball after that.

== National team career ==
Chatzivrettas was a member of the senior Greece men's national basketball team. He played for Greece at the 2001 EuroBasket, the 2003 EuroBasket, and the 2004 Summer Olympic Games. With Greece, he won the gold medal at the 2005 EuroBasket, and the silver medal at the 2006 FIBA World Cup. He also played at the 2007 EuroBasket.

== Awards and accomplishments ==
=== Pro career ===
- 3× Greek League All-Star: (2001, 2002, 2004)
- Greek League Top Scorer: (2002)
- Russian Championship Champion: (2003)
- 6× Greek League Champion: (2004, 2005, 2006, 2007, 2008, 2009)
- Greek League Finals MVP: (2004)
- 5× Greek Cup Winner: (2005, 2006, 2007, 2008, 2009)
- 2× EuroLeague Champion: (2007, 2009)
- 2× Triple Crown Winner: (2007, 2009)
- Greek League Hall of Fame: (2022)

=== Greece national team ===
- 6× Acropolis Tournament Champion: (2000, 2002, 2003, 2005, 2006, 2007)
- 2× Acropolis Tournament MVP: (2003, 2004)
- 2005 EuroBasket: Gold
- 2006 FIBA Stanković World Cup: Gold
- 2006 FIBA World Cup: Silver
- FIBA EuroStar: (2007)

== Career statistics ==
=== EuroLeague ===
†	Denotes seasons in which Chatzivrettas won the EuroLeague

Year	Team	GP	GS	MPG	FG%	3P%	FT%	RPG	APG	SPG	BPG	PPG	PIR
2002–03	CSKA Moscow	22	19	27.0	.464	.376	.842	2.6	1.8	1.0	.1	12.0	11.7
2003–04	Panathinaikos	20	12	30.1	.459	.342	.784	2.9	1.3	.6	.1	12.1	10.5
2004–05	Panathinaikos	21	11	18.5	.471	.381	.750	1.3	0.9	.4	.1	6.6	4.7
2005–06	Panathinaikos	23	22	17.2	.543	.429	.810	1.1	0.6	.3	—	6.5	4.4
2006–07†	Panathinaikos	22	10	23.1	.487	.429	.695	1.6	1.0	.9	.1	7.9	6.5
2007–08	Panathinaikos	18	6	16.2	.588	.519	.722	1.2	0.6	.4	.2	4.8	4.3
2008–09†	Panathinaikos	15	4	8.2	.346	.353	.833	.6	.3	.2	—	1.9	.1
Career		141	84	20.7	.482	.393	.776	1.7	.9	.6	.1	7.7	6.3
