= Fanis Christodoulou =

Greek basketball player (born 1965)

Fanis Christodoulou Φάνης Χριστοδούλου
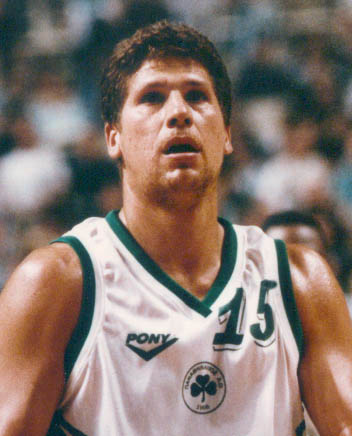
- Christodoulou with Panathinaikos in 1998

Panionios
- Title: General manager

Personal information
- Born: May 22, 1965 (age 61) Athens, Greece
- Listed height: 6 ft 8 in (2.03 m)
- Listed weight: 250 lb (113 kg)

Career information
- NBA draft: 1987: 4th round, 90th overall pick
- Drafted by: Atlanta Hawks
- Playing career: 1983–1998
- Position: Small forward / power forward
- Number: 4, 15

Career history
- 1983–1997: Panionios
- 1997–1998: Panathinaikos

Career highlights
- As a player: FIBA Balkans Selection (1991 I); Greek League champion (1998); Greek Cup winner (1991); Greek League MVP (1993); 2× Greek All-Star (1991, 1994 I); Acropolis Tournament MVP (1996); No. 4 retired by Panionios; Greek League Hall of Fame (2022)
- Stats at Basketball Reference
Medals
Event	1st	2nd	3rd
FIBA EuroBasket	1	1	0
Balkan Championship	1	1	2
Total	2	2	2
Men's basketball
Representing Greece
FIBA EuroBasket
Gold medal – first place	1987 Greece	
Silver medal – second place	1989 Yugoslavia	
Balkan Championship
Gold medal – first place	1986 Bulgaria	
Silver medal – second place	1983 Yugoslavia	
Bronze medal – third place	1984 Greece	
Bronze medal – third place	1985 Romania	

Theofanis "Fanis" Christodoulou (Greek: Θεοφάνης "Φάνης" Χριστοδούλου; born May 22, 1965) is a Greek former professional basketball player. He played mainly at the small forward position, but his complete all-around skills allowed him to play at all five basketball positions. During his playing career, many sports journalists called him "The European Charles Barkley". While his nickname among his teammates was "Bembis" ("Baby Boy").

Christodoulou's number 4 jersey was retired by Panionios. Christodoulou was inducted into the Greek League Hall of Fame in 2022. A FIBA Balkans Selection member, in 1991, and a two-time FIBA EuroBasket All-Tournament Team selection, in 1993 and 1995, Christodoulou is also a candidate for the FIBA Hall of Fame.

== Professional career ==
Christodoulou started his playing career with the youth teams of the Greek club Dafni. In 1983, he was transferred from Dafni, to the Greek club Panionios. In exchange for the player rights to Christodoulou, Dafni received a transfer fee in the amount of 3 million Greek Drachmas, and six players. He ended up spending most of his pro club career with Panionios, where he played from 1983 to 1997. With Panionios, he won the Greek Cup title in the year 1991. With Panionios, he was also a member of the FIBA Balkans Selection team in 1991, and the Greek League MVP in 1993.

Christodoulou spent the last year of his club career playing with the Greek club Panathinaikos, after he signed a $1.6 million contract with the club in 1997. With Panathinaikos, he won the Greek League championship, in the 1997–98 season. After that, he retired from playing pro club basketball.

=== NBA draft rights ===
Christodoulou was drafted by the Atlanta Hawks in the 1987 NBA draft as the 90th pick overall, but decided to stay in Greece and didn't join the NBA.

== National team career ==
Christodoulou was a member of the senior men's Greek national team that competed at the 1986 FIBA World Championship. With Greece, he won the gold medal at the 1987 FIBA EuroBasket. He also represented Greece at the 1988 FIBA European Olympic Qualifying Tournament.

After that, he won a silver medal at the 1989 FIBA EuroBasket. Christodoulou was also a member of the Greek national teams at the following major FIBA tournaments: the 1990 FIBA World Championship, the 1992 FIBA European Olympic Qualifying Tournament, the 1993 FIBA EuroBasket, the 1994 FIBA World Championship, the 1995 FIBA EuroBasket, the 1996 Summer Olympic Games, and the 1997 FIBA EuroBasket.

Christodoulou also represented Greece at the 1983 Mediterranean Games, and at several Balkan Championships, where he won several medals. On an individual level, Christodoulou was named to the FIBA EuroBasket All-Tournament Team at both the 1993 FIBA EuroBasket and the 1995 FIBA EuroBasket. He was also named the Acropolis Tournament's MVP in 1996.

== Executive career ==
In 2022, Christodoulou became the general manager of the Greek Basketball League club Panionios.

== Personal life ==
Christodoulou's older brother, Christos, was also a professional basketball player. They played together in the same club team, Panionios. His niece, Stella, is a professional volleyball player. He owns an OPAP betting shop in Paros, Greece. His family's hails is from Rozena Corinthia

== Awards and accomplishments ==
=== Pro clubs ===
- Greek League Champion: 1 (with Panathinaikos: 1997–98)
- Greek Cup Winner: 1 (with Panionios: 1990–91)

=== Greek senior national team ===
- 1983 Balkan Championship: Silver
- 1984 Balkan Championship: Bronze
- 1985 Balkan Championship: Bronze
- 1986 Balkan Championship: Gold
- 1987 FIBA EuroBasket: Gold
- 1989 FIBA EuroBasket: Silver

=== Clubs ===
- FIBA Balkans Selection: (1991 I)
- 2× Greek League All-Star: (1991, 1994 I)
- Greek League MVP: (1993)
- Number 4 jersey retired by Panionios
- Greek League Hall of Fame: (2022)

=== Greek senior national team ===
- FIBA EuroBasket All-Tournament Team: 2 (1993, 1995)
- Acropolis Tournament MVP: (1996)
- FIBA Hall of Fame Candidate
