= 2017 Acropolis International Basketball Tournament =

Tournament details
- Arena: OAKA Olympic Indoor Hall; Athens, Greece
- Dates: August 23–25

Final positions
- Champions: Georgia (1st title)
- Runners-up: Serbia
- Third place: Greece
- Fourth place: Italy

The Acropolis International Tournament 2017 was a basketball tournament held in OAKA Indoor Hall in Athens, Greece, from August 23 until August 25, 2017. It was the 28th edition of the Acropolis International Basketball Tournament. The four participating teams were Greece, Georgia, Italy, and Serbia.

== Venues ==
| Athens | Greece |
|---|---|
| Marousi, Athens | 2017 Acropolis International Basketball Tournament is located in Greece |
| Olympic Indoor Hall; Capacity: 18,989 | 2017 Acropolis International Basketball Tournament is located in Greece |

== Participating teams ==
- Greece
- Georgia
- Italy
- Serbia

== Standings ==
| Team | Pld | W | L | PF | PA | PD | Pts | Tie |
|---|---|---|---|---|---|---|---|---|
| Georgia | 3 | 2 | 1 | 205 | 210 | −5 | 5 | 1–0 |
| Serbia | 3 | 2 | 1 | 208 | 200 | +8 | 5 | 0–1 |
| Greece | 3 | 1 | 2 | 211 | 211 | 0 | 4 | 1–0 |
| Italy | 3 | 1 | 2 | 208 | 211 | −3 | 4 | 0–1 |

== Results ==
All times are local Central European Summer Time (UTC+2).

August 23
17:45

| Serbia | 73–65 | Italy |
Scoring by quarter: 22–24, 18–14, 19–18, 14–9

O.A.C.A. Olympic Hall, Marousi, Athens

August 23
20:00

| Greece | 71–72 | Georgia |
Scoring by quarter: 18–8, 19–25, 15–20, 19–19

O.A.C.A. Olympic Hall, Marousi, Athens

August 24
17:45

| Georgia | 68–66 | Serbia |
Scoring by quarter: 15–20, 21–16, 14–19, 18–11

O.A.C.A. Olympic Hall, Marousi, Athens

August 24
20:00

| Greece | 73–70 (OT) | Italy |
Scoring by quarter: 20–16, 13–15, 17–14, 14–19, Overtime: 9–6

O.A.C.A. Olympic Hall, Marousi, Athens

August 25
17:45

| Italy | 73–65 | Georgia |
Scoring by quarter: 26–17, 15–14, 17–24, 15–10

O.A.C.A. Olympic Hall, Marousi, Athens

August 25
20:00

| Greece | 67–69 | Serbia |
Scoring by quarter: 18–21, 17–17, 9–16, 23–15

O.A.C.A. Olympic Hall, Marousi, Athens

== Final standing ==
| Rank | Team |
|---|---|
| 1st place, gold medalist(s) | Georgia |
| 2nd place, silver medalist(s) | Serbia |
| 3rd place, bronze medalist(s) | Greece |
| 4 | Italy |

2017 Acropolis International Basketball winners

Georgia
First title
