= 2011 Acropolis International Basketball Tournament =

Basketball event

Tournament details
- Arena: OAKA Olympic Indoor Hall; Athens, Greece
- Dates: August 23–25

Final positions
- Champions: Italy
- Runners-up: Greece
- Third place: Bulgaria
- Fourth place: (United States) Brigham Young University

Awards and statistics
- MVP: (Greece) Antonis Fotsis
- Top scorer(s): (Italy) Danilo Gallinari (18.7 points per game)

The Acropolis International Tournament 2011 was a basketball tournament held in OAKA Indoor Hall in Athens, Greece, from August 23 until August 25, 2011. This was the 25th edition of the Acropolis International Basketball Tournament. The four participating teams were Greece, Brigham Young University, Bulgaria and Italy.

== Venues ==
Athens	Greece
Marousi, Athens	2011 Acropolis International Basketball Tournament is located in Greece
Olympic Indoor Hall; Capacity: 18,989	2011 Acropolis International Basketball Tournament is located in Greece

== Participating teams ==
- Greece
- (United States) BYU Cougars
- Bulgaria
- Italy

== Standings ==
Team	Pld	W	L	PF	PA	PD	Pts
Italy	3	3	0	258	215	+43	6
Greece	3	2	1	265	203	+62	5
Bulgaria	2	0	2	138	175	−37	2
(United States) BYU Cougars	2	0	2	117	185	−68	2

== Results ==
All times are local Central European Summer Time (UTC+2).

August 23
17:45

Italy	74–71	Bulgaria
Scoring by quarter: 21-16, 19-26, 18-19, 16-20

O.A.C.A. Olympic Hall, Marousi, Athens

August 23
20:15

Greece	83–54	(United States) BYU Cougars
Scoring by quarter: 28-12, 24-14, 7-12, 24-16

O.A.C.A. Olympic Hall, Marousi, Athens

August 24
17:45

(United States) BYU Cougars	63–102	Italy
Scoring by quarter: 14-23, 22-20, 9-34, 18-25

O.A.C.A. Olympic Hall, Marousi, Athens

August 24
20:15

Greece	101–67	Bulgaria
Scoring by quarter: 31-13, 25-19, 18-24, 27-11

O.A.C.A. Olympic Hall, Marousi, Athens

August 24
17:45

Bulgaria	Not–played	(United States) BYU Cougars

O.A.C.A. Olympic Hall, Marousi, Athens

August 24
20:15

Greece	81–82 (OT)	Italy
Scoring by quarter: 11-20, 20-8, 16-15, 15-19, Overtime: 19-20

O.A.C.A. Olympic Hall, Marousi, Athens

== Final standing ==
Rank	Team
1st place, gold medalist(s)	Italy
2nd place, silver medalist(s)	Greece
3rd place, bronze medalist(s)	Bulgaria
4	(United States) BYU Cougars

2011 Acropolis International Basketball winners

Italy
3rd title

Most Valuable Player
(Greece) Antonis Fotsis
