= National Athletic Center Glyfada Makis Liougas =

Sports arean in Glyfada, Athens, Greece

Glyfada Makis Liougas Sportshall
- Glyfada Indoor Hall
- Interactive map of Glyfada Makis Liougas Sportshall
- Full name: National Athletic Center Glyfada Makis Liougas
- Address: Fivis 14 & Ioannou Metaxa 16674 Glyfada - Athens
- Location: Glyfada, Athens, Greece
- Coordinates: 37°51′33.39″N 23°45′19.20″E
- Owner: General Secretariat of Sports
- Capacity: Basketball, Volleyball, Handball: 2,272 (permanent seats); 3,500 (with collapsible seats)
- Surface: Parquet

Construction
- Opened: 1970
- Renovated: 2004, 2022

National Athletic Center Glyfada Makis Liougas, commonly known as Glyfada Indoor Hall (Greek: Εθνικό Αθλητικό Κέντρου Γλυφάδας Ματθαίος Λιούγκας) is an indoor arena that is located in Glyfada, Athens, Greece. Its current total seating capacity is 3,500 people, of which 2,270 seats are permanent, and 1,228 are collapsible. The arena is mainly used to host volleyball, handball, and basketball games.

== History ==
Glyfada Indoor Hall opened in 1970. It was the largest indoor arena in Athens until 1985, when the Peace and Friendship Stadium was inaugurated. Over the years, the arena has been used by: Panathinaikos B.C., Panathinaikos V.C., Olympiacos B.C., Panionios B.C., Ikaros Kallitheas B.C., Olympiacos Women's Basketball, the Greek women's national basketball team, and the Greek women's national volleyball team.

The arena was completely renovated and remodeled in 2022.
