= 2015 Acropolis International Basketball Tournament =

Tournament details
- Arena: OAKA Olympic Indoor Hall; Athens, Greece
- Dates: August 27–29

Final positions
- Champions: Greece (17th title)
- Runners-up: Turkey
- Third place: Lithuania
- Fourth place: Netherlands

The Acropolis International Tournament 2015 was a basketball tournament held in OAKA Indoor Hall in Athens, Greece, from August 27 until August 29, 2015. It was the 27th edition of the Acropolis International Basketball Tournament. The four participating teams were Greece, Turkey, Lithuania, and Netherlands.

== Venues ==
Athens	Greece
Marousi, Athens	2015 Acropolis International Basketball Tournament is located in Greece
Olympic Indoor Hall; Capacity: 18,989	2015 Acropolis International Basketball Tournament is located in Greece

== Participating teams ==
- Greece
- Lithuania
- Netherlands
- Turkey

== Standings ==
Team	Pld	W	L	PF	PA	PD	Pts
Greece	3	3	0	221	200	+21	6
Turkey	3	2	1	224	209	+15	5
Lithuania	3	1	2	209	210	−1	4
Netherlands	3	0	3	246	281	−35	3

== Results ==
All times are local Central European Summer Time (UTC+2).

August 27
18:00

Turkey	71–53	Lithuania
Scoring by quarter: 15–15, 9–15, 25–21, 4–20

O.A.C.A. Olympic Hall, Marousi, Athens

August 27
20:15

Greece	92–80	Netherlands
Scoring by quarter: 25–18, 23–22, 23–16, 18–25

O.A.C.A. Olympic Hall, Marousi, Athens

August 28
18:00

Lithuania	94–72	Netherlands
Scoring by quarter: 26–18, 24–16, 23–19, 21–19

O.A.C.A. Olympic Hall, Marousi, Athens

August 28
20:15

Greece	62–58	Turkey
Scoring by quarter: 29–19, 8–16, 11–9, 14–14

O.A.C.A. Olympic Hall, Marousi, Athens

August 29
18:00

Turkey	95–94 (OT)	Netherlands
Scoring by quarter: 31–11, 22–24, 14–19, 7–20, Overtime: 21–20

O.A.C.A. Olympic Hall, Marousi, Athens

August 29
20:15

Greece	67–62	Lithuania
Scoring by quarter: 16–15, 15–16, 18–15, 18–16

O.A.C.A. Olympic Hall, Marousi, Athens

== Final standing ==
Rank	Team
1st place, gold medalist(s)	Greece
2nd place, silver medalist(s)	Turkey
3rd place, bronze medalist(s)	Lithuania
4	Netherlands

2015 Acropolis International Basketball winners

Greece
17th title
