= 2010 Acropolis International Basketball Tournament =

Tournament details
- Arena: OAKA Olympic Indoor Hall; Athens, Greece
- Dates: August 17–19

Final positions
- Champions: Greece (15th title)
- Runners-up: Slovenia
- Third place: Serbia
- Fourth place: Canada

Awards and statistics
- MVP: (Greece) Sofoklis Schortsanitis

The Acropolis International Tournament 2010 was a basketball tournament held in OAKA Indoor Hall in Athens, Greece, from August 17 until August 19, 2010. This was the 24th edition of the Acropolis International Basketball Tournament. The four participating teams were Greece, Serbia, Canada, and Slovenia.

== Venues ==
Athens	Greece
Marousi, Athens	2010 Acropolis International Basketball Tournament is located in Greece
Olympic Indoor Hall; Capacity: 18,989	2010 Acropolis International Basketball Tournament is located in Greece

== Participating teams ==
- Greece
- Canada
- Serbia
- Slovenia

== Standings ==
Team	Pld	W	L	PF	PA	PD	Pts	Tie
Greece	3	3	0	293	194	+99	6	
Slovenia	3	1	2	239	249	−10	4	1–1, +14
Serbia	3	1	2	213	217	−4	4	1–1, -3
Canada	3	1	2	182	267	−85	4	1–1, -11

=== Tiebreaker ===
Slovenia, Serbia and Canada all had 1 win and 2 losses. Since each team had won one of the two games with the other teams (excluding Greece, who had a 3–0 record), a second tiebreaker was used to determine the second, third, and fourth place. Compared among the other tied teams, Slovenia had an overall 14 point difference, Serbia had a -3 point difference and Canada had a -11 point difference. The teams were ranked by the point difference from highest to lowest. Thus, Slovenia won the silver medal, Serbia won the bronze, and Canada was left with fourth place.

== Results ==
August 17

Greece	123–49	Canada
Scoring by quarter: 27-6, 31-14, 26-12, 39-17

O.A.C.A. Olympic Hall, Marousi, Athens

August 17

Serbia	82–81	Slovenia
Scoring by quarter: 21-27, 17-24, 23-14, 21-16

O.A.C.A. Olympic Hall, Marousi, Athens

August 18

Greece	96–72	Slovenia
Scoring by quarter: 27-19, 31-7, 21-22, 17-24

O.A.C.A. Olympic Hall, Marousi, Athens

August 18

Serbia	58–62	Canada
Scoring by quarter: 12-10, 7-22, 11-22, 20-6

O.A.C.A. Olympic Hall, Marousi, Athens

August 19

Greece	74–73	Serbia
Scoring by quarter: 23-24, 19-17, 16-13, 16-19

O.A.C.A. Olympic Hall, Marousi, Athens

August 19

Canada	71–86	Slovenia
Scoring by quarter: 14-21, 18-22, 15-23, 24-20

O.A.C.A. Olympic Hall, Marousi, Athens

== Final standing ==
Rank	Team
1st place, gold medalist(s)	Greece
2nd place, silver medalist(s)	Slovenia
3rd place, bronze medalist(s)	Serbia
4	Canada

2010 Acropolis International Basketball winners

Greece
15th title

Most Valuable Player
(Greece) Sofoklis Schortsanitis

== Games ==
=== Greece vs. Canada ===
The Greek national team completely thrashed Canada in game one of the Acropolis tournament, winning their game by a score of 123–49. The Greek team set a new record for the highest point differential in an Acropolis tournament, at 74 points. Canada's head coach blamed the long trip from Canada to Greece, and a lack of energy as a result. The Greeks' Schortsanitis put in 24 points, before sustaining an injury late in the third quarter, while Greece's Calathes had 10 assists.

=== Greece vs. Serbia ===
The head coach of Serbia, Dušan Ivković, was ejected with 6:00 remaining in the fourth quarter of the game, after receiving his second technical foul of the game.

==== Greece vs. Serbia bench clearing brawl ====
With 2:40 left in the game, and Greece up by one point, Greece, which was the home team, had possession of the ball. After receiving a back-door pass from Greece's point forward Dimitris Diamantidis, who drew a double team, the wide-open Greek power forward Antonis Fotsis, attempted a three-point shot, while Serbia's point guard Miloš Teodosić, ran over to cover him and got called for a foul in the process.

Within seconds, as Teodosić began to complain to the referee over the call, an agitated Fotsis came over and interrupted Teodosić's attempt at talking to the ref, by getting in Teodosić's face with a raised hand and a pointed finger, seemingly lecturing and/or threatening him, over what had just occurred. Due to a considerable size advantage, the 2.09 m (6'10¼") tall and 113 kg (249 lb) Fotsis, easily imposed himself onto the 1.96 m (6 ft 5 in) tall and 95 kg (209 lb) Teodosić, and pushed him back, as Diamantidis and Serbia's small forward Novica Veličković, as well as one of the referees, quickly joined in an attempt to separate Fotsis and Teodosić from each other. With three people then holding Fotsis and Teodosić apart, Fotsis managed to grab a hold of both of Teodosić's arms, to which Teodosić reacted, by trying to free himself, as he moved his hand towards Fotsis' face. Already well agitated, Fotsis reacted by spitting in Teodosić's face, as Serbia's small forward Marko Kešelj, then also joined the group that was holding Fotsis and Teodosić away from each other. Fotsis followed up by grabbing the back of Teodosić's head with his left hand, and he then attempted to punch him with his right hand. However, he was unable to throw the punch, because he was held back by the people around him. Fotsis' spitting at and attempted punching of Teodosić, drew more players into the fight, as the Serbian national team's center and captain, Nenad Krstić, jumped into the scuffle from the back, and grabbed Fotsis' face with an open hand, while Veličković then also proceeded to do the same, and managed to wrestle Fotsis away from Teodosić.

Mayhem then engulfed the entire court, as both squads - including the benches and team officials - became involved. The pack moved to the bench, where Krstić threw a chair that hit Greek center Ioannis Bourousis in the head; Bourousis was not scheduled to appear on the court in the game, due to an injury, and he was watching the game on the bench. After the brawl, for safety reasons, the game was prematurely ended, with the final score standing at 74–73 in favor of Greece. Krstić was arrested and held overnight, for assaulting Bourousis.

For their involvement in the brawl, Krstić was suspended for the first three games of the 2010 FIBA World Championship tournament, and he was fined CHF45,000 (€42,800/ US$46,000); while Teodosić, Fotsis and Greek center Sofoklis Schortsanitis, were suspended for the first two games of the 2010 World Championship. Both teams were also fined CHF20,000 (€19,000/ US$20,500) by FIBA.
