= 2013 Acropolis International Basketball Tournament =

Tournament details
- Arena: OAKA Olympic Indoor Hall; Athens, Greece
- Dates: August 27–29

Final positions
- Champions: Greece (16th title)
- Runners-up: Lithuania
- Third place: Italy
- Fourth place: Bosnia and Herzegovina

Awards and statistics
- MVP: (Greece) Nikos Zisis

The Acropolis International Tournament 2013 was a basketball tournament held in OAKA Indoor Hall in Athens, Greece, from August 27 until August 29, 2013. It was the 26th edition of the Acropolis International Basketball Tournament. The four participating teams were Greece, Italy, Lithuania, and Bosnia and Herzegovina.

== Venues ==
Athens	Greece
Marousi, Athens	2013 Acropolis International Basketball Tournament is located in Greece
Olympic Indoor Hall; Capacity: 18,989	2013 Acropolis International Basketball Tournament is located in Greece

== Participating teams ==
- Greece
- Bosnia and Herzegovina
- Italy
- Lithuania

== Standings ==
Team	Pld	W	L	PF	PA	PD	Pts
Greece	3	3	0	247	198	+49	6
Lithuania	3	2	1	235	216	+19	5
Italy	3	1	2	201	220	−19	4
Bosnia and Herzegovina	3	0	3	206	255	−49	3

== Results ==
All times are local Central European Summer Time (UTC+2).

August 27
17:30

Italy	63–79	Lithuania
Scoring by quarter: 16–17, 16–21, 17–22, 14–19

O.A.C.A. Olympic Hall, Marousi, Athens

August 27
20:00

Greece	88–71	Bosnia and Herzegovina
Scoring by quarter: 19–15, 25–16, 23–20, 21–20

O.A.C.A. Olympic Hall, Marousi, Athens

August 28
18:00

Greece	80–62	Lithuania
Scoring by quarter: 20–13, 19–18, 21–20, 20–11

O.A.C.A. Olympic Hall, Marousi, Athens

August 28
20:30

Bosnia and Herzegovina	62–73	Italy
Scoring by quarter: 14–18, 15–17, 26–19, 7–19

O.A.C.A. Olympic Hall, Marousi, Athens

August 29
17:30

Lithuania	94–73	Bosnia and Herzegovina
Scoring by quarter: 27–24, 25–16, 20–13, 22–20

O.A.C.A. Olympic Hall, Marousi, Athens

August 29
20:00

Greece	79–65	Italy
Scoring by quarter: 24–17, 22–13, 13–17, 20–18

O.A.C.A. Olympic Hall, Marousi, Athens

== Final standing ==
Rank	Team
1st place, gold medalist(s)	Greece
2nd place, silver medalist(s)	Lithuania
3rd place, bronze medalist(s)	Italy
4	Bosnia and Herzegovina

2013 Acropolis International Basketball winners

Greece
16th title

Most Valuable Player
(Greece) Nikos Zisis

== Statistics ==
Points

Rank	Name	G	Pts	PPG
1	(Greece) Georgios Printezis	2	32	16.0
2	(Italy) Pietro Aradori	2	30	15.0
3–4	(Italy) Marco Belinelli	2	29	14.5
3–4	(Bosnia and Herzegovina) Zack Wright	2	29	14.5
5	(Italy) Andrea Cinciarini	2	28	14.0

Rebounds

Rank	Name	G	Reb	RPG
1	(Italy) Marco Cusin	2	14	7.0
2	(Greece) Kostas Papanikolaou	2	13	6.5
3	(Lithuania) Jonas Valančiūnas	2	11	5.5
-	(Italy) Pietro Aradori	2	11	5.5
5	(Bosnia and Herzegovina) Zack Wright	2	10	5.0

Assists

Rank	Name	G	Ast	APG
1	(Greece) Vassilis Spanoulis	2	16	8.0
2	(Lithuania) Mantas Kalnietis	2	12	6.0
3	(Greece) Nikos Zisis	2	6	3.0
-	(Italy) Marco Belinelli	2	6	3.0
5	(Lithuania) Jonas Mačiulis	2	5	2.5
