= March 2007 in sports =

<<	March 2007					>>
Su	Mo	Tu	We	Th	Fr	Sa
				1	2	3
4	5	6	7	8	9	10
11	12	13	14	15	16	17
18	19	20	21	22	23	24
25	26	27	28	29	30	31
Canada; India; Sports

This list shows notable sports-related deaths, events, and notable outcomes that occurred in March of 2007.

== Deaths ==
- 23: Ed Bailey
- 24: Jun Bernardino
- 18: Bob Woolmer
- 16: Manjural Islam Rana
- 15: Bowie Kuhn
- 11: Cec Anstey
- 2: Clem Labine

== Sporting seasons ==
- Auto racing 2007:
  - Formula One
  - A1 Grand Prix
  - NASCAR NEXTEL Cup
  - NASCAR Busch Series
  - NASCAR Craftsman Truck Series
  - World Rally Championship
  - IRL
  - V8 Supercar
  - Rolex Sports Car Series
  - American Le Mans Series
  - FIA GT
  - Le Mans Series
- Baseball 2007
  - Chinese Professional Baseball League (Taiwan)
- Basketball 2007:
  - Australian National Basketball League
  - Euroleague
  - National Basketball Association
  - NCAA Men's Basketball
    - NCAA men's tournament
  - NCAA women's basketball tournament
  - PBA Fiesta Conference
  - ULEB Cup
- Cricket 2006–07:
  - Australia
  - South Africa
- Cycling
  - UCI ProTour
- Football (soccer) 2006–07:
  - 2006–07 UEFA Champions League
  - 2006–07 UEFA Cup
  - England (general)
    - Premier League 2006-07
  - Scotland (general)
    - Scottish Premier League 2006-07
  - Argentina
- Golf:
  - 2007 PGA Tour
  - 2007 European Tour
  - 2007 LPGA Tour
- Ice hockey 2006–07:
  - National Hockey League
- Lacrosse 2007:
  - National Lacrosse League
- Motorcycle racing 2007:
  - Motorcycle GP
- Rugby league 2007:
  - Super League XII
- Rugby union 2007:
  - 2007 Super 14 season
  - 2006–07 Heineken Cup
  - English Premiership
  - 2006–07 Top 14
  - 2006–07 Celtic League
  - 2007 Rugby World Cup qualifying
  - 2006–07 IRB Sevens
- Speedway:
  - Speedway Grand Prix
- Volleyball 2007:
  - Men's CEV Champions League 2006-07
  - Women's CEV Champions League 2006-07

== 31 March 2007 (Saturday) ==
- Baseball Spring training finale
  - "Civil Rights Game": St. Louis Cardinals 5, Cleveland Indians 1, AutoZone Park, Memphis, Tennessee.
- Basketball:
  - NCAA Final Four at the Georgia Dome, Atlanta, Georgia:
    - National Semifinals:
      - (South #1) Ohio State 67, (East #2) Georgetown 60
      - (Midwest #1) Florida 76, (West #2) UCLA 66
- Cricket
  - 2007 Cricket World Cup Super Eights
    - Australia 106/0 (13.5/22 ov.) beat Bangladesh 104/6 (22/22 ov.) by 10 wickets (D/L)

== 30 March 2007 (Friday) ==
- Cricket:
  - 2007 Cricket World Cup Super Eights
    - England 266/7 (50 ov.) beat Ireland 218 (48.1 ov.) by 48 runs

== 29 March 2007 (Thursday) ==
- Basketball:
  - NCAA NIT Final at Madison Square Garden: West Virginia 78, Clemson 73
- Football (soccer): Former Argentina striker Diego Maradona was rushed to the hospital due to alcohol and cigarette abuse.
- Cricket:
  - 2007 Cricket World Cup Super Eights
    - New Zealand 179/3 (39.2 ov.) beat West Indies 177 (44.4 ov.) by 7 wickets

== 28 March 2007 (Wednesday) ==
- Football (soccer) 2008 UEFA European Football Championship qualifying
  - Group A: Azerbaijan 1–0 Finland
  - Group A: Poland 1–0 Armenia
  - Group A: Serbia 1–1 Portugal
  - Group B: Georgia 3–1 Faroe Islands
  - Group B: Italy 2–0 Scotland
  - Group B: Ukraine 1–0 Lithuania
  - Group C: Hungary 2–0 Moldova
  - Group C: Malta 0–1 Greece
  - Group C: Turkey 2–2 Norway
  - Group D: Czech Republic 1–0 Cyprus
  - Group D: Republic of Ireland 1–0 Slovakia
  - Group D: Wales 3–0 San Marino
  - Group E: Andorra 0–3 England
  - Group E: Israel 4–0 Estonia
  - Group F: Liechtenstein 1–0 Latvia
  - Group F: Northern Ireland 2–1 Sweden
  - Group F: Spain 1–0 Iceland
  - Group G: Bulgaria 0–0 Albania
  - Group G: Romania 3–0 Luxembourg
  - Group G: Slovenia 0–1 Netherlands
- Former Major League Baseball pitcher Ugueth Urbina was sentenced by a Venezuelan court to 14 years in prison for the attempted murders of five workers on his family farm in 2005. www.usatoday.com
- Cricket:
  - 2007 Cricket World Cup Super Eights
    - South Africa 212/9 (48.2 ov.) beat Sri Lanka 209 (49.3 ov.) by 1 wicket.
      - Sri Lankan bowler Lasith Malinga becomes the first player to take four wickets in four balls in an ODI.
    - Australia 322/6 (50 ov.) beat West Indies 219 (45.3 ov) by 103 runs.
- Basketball: Chinese Basketball Association 2006–07 Finals:
  - The Bayi Rockets defeat the Guangdong Southern Tigers 88–83 to win the best-of-seven championship series, 4–1.

== 27 March 2007 (Tuesday) ==
- Basketball:
  - NCAA women's tournament Elite Eight:
    - Dayton Final:
      - (1) Tennessee 98, (7) Mississippi 62
      The 36-point margin of victory is the largest in a Regional Finals in Women's tournament history.
    - Dallas Final:
      - (1) North Carolina 84, (2) Purdue 72

== 26 March 2007 (Monday) ==
- Basketball:
  - NCAA women's tournament Elite Eight:
    - Greensboro Final:
      - (4) Rutgers 64, (3) Arizona State 45
    - Fresno Final:
      - (3) LSU 73, (1) Connecticut 50

== 25 March 2007 (Sunday) ==
- Auto racing:
  - NASCAR NEXTEL Cup:
    - Food City 500 at Bristol, Tennessee:
    (1) Kyle Busch (2) Jeff Burton (3) Jeff Gordon
    Race extended by four laps because of green-white-checkers finish in the first Car of Tomorrow race. Kyle Busch's win gives Chevrolet their 600th Cup victory.
- Basketball:
  - NCAA women's tournament Sweet 16:
    - Dayton Regional:
      - (1) Tennessee 65, (13) Marist 46
      - (7) Mississippi 90, (3) Oklahoma 82
    - Dallas Regional:
      - (2) Purdue 78, (3) Georgia 65
      - (1) North Carolina 70, (5) George Washington 56
  - NCAA men's tournament Regional Finals:
    - Midwest Regional Final at St. Louis, Missouri:
      - (1) Florida 85, (3) Oregon 77
      Lee Humphrey sinks seven three-pointers and frustrates his Oregon counterpart Tajuan Porter all game. The Gators become the first defending champion to reach the Final Four since Michigan State in 2001.
    - East Regional Final at East Rutherford, New Jersey:
      - (2) Georgetown 96, (1) North Carolina 84 (OT)
      North Carolina takes a 10-point lead with 6 minutes left in regulation. But the Tar Heels go stone cold shooting just as Jeff Green and the Hoyas catch fire. UNC goes 1-for-23 from the floor over a nearly 15-minute period that ends in the closing seconds of overtime, when the team hits its only basket of the extra period.
- Cricket:
  - 2007 Cricket World Cup Group Stage
    - Group B: Bangladesh Bangladesh defeated Bermuda Bermuda by 7 wickets (D/L Method) to qualify for the Super Eights and knock India out of the World Cup

== 24 March 2007 (Saturday) ==
- Football (soccer) 2008 UEFA European Football Championship qualifying
  - Group A: Kazakhstan 2–1 Serbia
  - Group A: Poland 5–0 Azerbaijan
  - Group A: Portugal 4–0 Belgium
  - Group B: Lithuania 0–1 France
  - Group B: Faroe Islands 0–2 Ukraine
  - Group B: Scotland 2–1 Georgia
  - Group C: Greece 1–4 Turkey
  - Group C: Moldova 1–1 Malta
  - Group C: Norway 1–2 Bosnia and Herzegovina
  - Group D: Czech Republic 1–2 Germany
  - Group D: Cyprus 1–3 Slovakia
  - Group D: Republic of Ireland 1–0 Wales
  - Group E: Croatia 2–1 North Macedonia
  - Group E: Estonia 0–2 Russia
  - Group E: Israel 0–0 England
  - Group F: Liechtenstein 1–4 Northern Ireland
  - Group F: Spain 2–1 Denmark
  - Group G: Albania 0–0 Slovenia
  - Group G: Luxembourg 1–2 Belarus
  - Group G: Netherlands 0–0 Romania
- US College basketball:
  - NCAA women's tournament Sweet 16
    - Greensboro Regional:
      - (3) Arizona State 67, (7) Bowling Green 49
      - (4) Rutgers 53, (1) Duke 52
      Lindsay Harding missed two free throws with :00.1 remaining to allow the Scarlet Knights to meet Arizona State in Monday's regional final.
    - Fresno Regional:
      - (1) Connecticut 78, (4) North Carolina State 71
      - (3) LSU 55, (10) Florida State 43
  - NCAA men's tournament Regional Finals:
    - South Regional Final at San Antonio, Texas:
      - (1) Ohio State 92, (2) Memphis 76
      Ohio State falls behind after center Greg Oden is forced to the bench after picking up his third foul early in the second half. Oden's return to the floor sparks the Buckeyes to a 20–8 run that puts them ahead for good. The Tigers' winning streak ends at 25 games; the Buckeyes' 21-game streak is now the nation's longest.
    - West Regional Final at San Jose, California:
      - (2) UCLA 68, (1) Kansas 55
      The Bruins advance to the Final Four for the 17th time. Arron Afflalo leads UCLA with 24 points, while Darren Collison adds another 14, including a key three-pointer to beat the shotclock late in the game. The two defensive powers combine for a tournament-record 32 steals.
  - In the NCAA Men's Division II Basketball Championship Final in Springfield, Massachusetts, Barton (North Carolina) stuns defending champions Winona State (Minnesota), which had been on a Division II-record 57-game winning streak, 77–75. After Winona State had taken a 74–67 lead with 45 seconds left, Barton's Anthony Atkinson scores 10 points in the last 39 seconds, including the game-winning layup at the buzzer. (AP via Sports Illustrated)
- Cricket:
  - 2007 Cricket World Cup Group Stage
    - Group A: Australia 377/6 (50 ov.) beat South Africa 294 (48 ov.) by 83 runs
    - Group C: England 178/3 (33/43 ov.) beat Kenya 177 (43/43 ov.) by 7 wickets
- Rugby union:
  - 2007 Rugby World Cup qualifying:
    - Portugal qualify for the 2007 World Cup in France later this year after winning a two-match series against Uruguay. Despite losing 18–12 in Montevideo, Portugal win on a 25–24 aggregate thanks to their win in Lisbon two weeks earlier. Qualifying first started in September 2004 with over 90 nations, Portugal's entry completes the 2007 World Cup pools – 4 groups of 5. This ends Uruguay's streak at the World Cup since 1999. It marks Portugal's debut.

== 23 March 2007 (Friday) ==
- US Men's College basketball:
  - NCAA men's tournament Sweet 16:
    - Midwest Regional in St. Louis, Missouri:
      - (1) Florida 65, (5) Butler 57
      - (3) Oregon 76, (7) UNLV 72
    - East Regional in East Rutherford, New Jersey:
      - (2) Georgetown 66, (6) Vanderbilt 65
      - (1) North Carolina 74, (5) Southern California 64
- Cricket:
  - 2007 Cricket World Cup Group Stage
    - Group B: Sri Lanka 254/6 (50 ov.) beat India 185 (43.3 ov.) by 69 runs
    - Group D: West Indies 190/2 (38.1/48 ov.) beat Ireland 183/8 (48 ov.) by 8 wickets under D/L method

== 22 March 2007 (Thursday) ==
- Basketball:
  - US Men's college basketball:
    - NCAA men's tournament Sweet 16:
      - West Regional in San Jose, California:
        - (1) Kansas 61, (4) Southern Illinois 58
        - (2) UCLA 64, (3) Pittsburgh 55
      - South Regional in San Antonio, Texas:
        - (2) Memphis 65, (3) Texas A&M 64
        - (1) Ohio State 85, (5) Tennessee 84
    - Away from the Madness of March, Tubby Smith resigns as head coach at Kentucky and accepts the same job at Minnesota.
  - NBA: Kobe Bryant of the Los Angeles Lakers scored 60 points against the Memphis Grizzlies away from home. Scoring 50 or more for three consecutive games, Bryant tied the record set by Wilt Chamberlain, Elgin Baylor and Michael Jordan.
  - Euroleague: Final day of Top 16 play in Group D and Group E. Teams qualifying for the quarterfinals are in **bold**.
    - Group D:
      - **TAU Cerámica** (Spain) , which had clinched first place in the group two weeks ago, complete an unbeaten Top 16 phase by defeating Pau-Orthez (France) 93–74 at home. (Euroleague)
      - **Maccabi Tel Aviv** (Israel) , already assured of second place, defeat Lottomatica Roma (Italy) 79–72 at home. (Euroleague)
    - Group E:
      - **Olympiacos** (Greece) secure second place and a quarterfinal berth by defeating DKV Joventut (Spain) 81–65 at home. (Euroleague)
      - **CSKA Moscow** (Russia) , already assured of topping the group, complete an unbeaten Top 16 phase with an 86–55 road annihilation of Partizan (Serbia) . (Euroleague)
- Cricket:
  - 2007 Cricket World Cup Group Stage
    - Group A: Netherlands 140/2 (23.5 ov.) beat Scotland 136 (34.1 ov.) by 8 wickets
    - Group C: New Zealand 363/5 (50 ov.) beat Canada 249 (49.2 ov.) by 114 runs
    - The death of Pakistani coach Bob Woolmer has been ruled as "asphyxia as a result of manual strangulation" by Jamaican police.

== 21 March 2007 (Wednesday) ==
- European Basketball:
  - Euroleague: Final day of Top 16 play in Group F and Group G. Teams qualifying for the quarterfinals are in **bold**.
    - Group F:
      - **Winterthur FCB** (Spain) defeat **Panathinaikos** (Greece) 87–66 at home. Panathinaikos went into the game assured of first place in the group, and Barça entered assured of second. (Euroleague)
      - Efes Pilsen (Turkey) defeat Prokom Trefl Sopot (Poland) 72–64 away. (Euroleague)
    - Group G:
      - In a winner-take-all showdown in Moscow for second place in the group and a quarterfinal berth, **Dynamo Moscow** (Russia) defeat Benetton Treviso 68–65 in overtime. For Dynamo, Antonis Fotsis has 22 points and a Euroleague-record 24 rebounds, and Lazaros Papadopoulos adds 24 points and 11 rebounds. (Euroleague)
      - Aris TT Bank (Greece) win their first game of the Top 16 phase 83–65 at home over group winners **Unicaja Málaga** (Spain) . (Euroleague)
- Cricket
  - 2007 Cricket World Cup Group Stage
    - Group B: Sri Lanka 318/4 (50 ov.) beat Bangladesh 112 (37/46 ov.) by 198 runs under D/L method
    - Group D: Pakistan 349 (49.5 ov.) beat Zimbabwe 99 (19.1/20 ov.) by 93 runs under D/L method

== 20 March 2007 (Tuesday) ==
- Basketball:
  - The completion of the second round of the NCAA women's tournament.
    - Greensboro 7th seed Bowling Green stunned the second seed in that region, Vanderbilt, 60–59, to advance to the Sweet Sixteen.
    - Dayton 7th seed Ole Miss eliminated defending champions Maryland in another major upset, 89–78.
- Cricket:
  - 2007 Cricket World Cup Group Stage
    - Group A: South Africa 188/3 (23.2 ov.) beat Scotland 186/8 (50 ov.) by 7 wickets
    - Group C: New Zealand 331/7 (50 ov.) beat Kenya 183 (49.2 ov.) by 148 runs

== 19 March 2007 (Monday) ==
- Basketball:
  - Second round of NCAA women's tournament begins.
    - Marist continued their Cinderella story as the 13 seed in the Dayton Region, upsetting fifth seed Middle Tennessee, 73–59. The Red Foxes tied Liberty (2005) and Texas A&M (1994) as the lowest seed to go into the "Sweet Sixteen".
    - Tenth-seeded Florida State upset second-seed Stanford on their home floor, 68–63 in the Fresno Region.
  - In an NAIA Semi-Final game in Kansas City, Concordia (Cal.) ended the quest for Robert Morris (Ill.) and their unbeaten season, 124–119 in quadruple overtime. The combined score of 243 points by both teams is an all-time NAIA Tournament record.
- Football (soccer):
  - 2006–07 FA Cup, sixth round proper (quarterfinal) replays:
    - Tottenham Hotspur 1–2 Chelsea
    - Manchester United 1–0 Middlesbrough
- Cricket:
  - 2007 Cricket World Cup Group Stage
    - Group B: India 413/5 beat Bermuda 156 (43.1 ov.) by 257 runs
      - It is the largest win margin in the World Cup
      - Bermuda's 156 is their largest score in the World Cup
      - India's 413/5 is the largest score any team has achieved in the World Cup
    - Group D: West Indies 204/4 (47.5 ov.) beat Zimbabwe 202/5 (50 ov.) by 6 wickets

== 18 March 2007 (Sunday) ==
- Auto racing:
  - Formula One
    - 2007 Australian Grand Prix
    (1) Kimi Räikkönen (Finland) (2) Fernando Alonso (Spain) (3) Lewis Hamilton (United Kingdom)
    Ferrari's Räikkönen wins the first race of the season. McLaren-Mercedes teammates Alonso and rookie F1-driver Hamilton take the next two spots.
  - NASCAR Nextel Cup:
    - Kobalt Tools 500 in Hampton, Georgia:
    (1) Jimmie Johnson (2) Tony Stewart (3) Matt Kenseth
- Basketball:
  - Final day of second round play in the NCAA men's tournament
    - The day's biggest surprise came when UNLV, the #7 seed in the Midwest Regional, upset #2 seed Wisconsin, 74–68.
    - In the East Regional, #5 Southern California whips #4 Texas, 87–68, potentially ending Kevin Durant's collegiate career.
    - Other winners were Florida, Oregon, Kansas, Southern Illinois, Tennessee and Memphis.
  - Completion of the first round of the NCAA women's tournament
- Cricket
  - 2007 Cricket World Cup Group Stage
    - Group A: Australia 358/5 (50 ov.) beat Netherlands 129 (26.5 ov.) by 229 runs
    - Group C: England 279/6 (50 ov.) beat Canada 228/7 (50 ov.) by 51 runs
      - Andrew Flintoff was left out of the England's team for this match and stripped of his vice-captaincy for breaching team discipline, after being caught heavy drinking and needed rescuing when he fell off a pedalo.
  - Bob Woolmer, Pakistan's coach died in the team hotel hours after Pakistan's elimination from the World Cup at the age of 58.

== 17 March 2007 (Saturday) ==
- Auto racing:
  - American Le Mans Series
    - 2007 12 Hours of Sebring – Audi takes their 8th straight overall victory for Marco Werner, Frank Biela, and Emanuele Pirro. Acura takes victory in the LMP2 class in their debut with Andretti Green Racing, while Corvette Racing takes GT1. Risi Competizione's Ferrari takes GT2 victory by .202 seconds over Flying Lizard's Porsche.
- Basketball:
  - Second round of NCAA men's basketball tournament:
    - In the East Region, sixth seed Vanderbilt tops third seed Washington State, 78–74, in double overtime; Derrick Byars sinks five three-pointers and scores 27 points for the Commodores.
    - Virginia Commonwealth, seeded 11th in the West Region, erases a 19-point deficit against third seed Pittsburgh but falls in overtime, 84–79.
    - Midwest Region fifth seed Butler beats fourth seed Maryland, 62–59, thanks to tight defense that forces 17 turnovers.
    - South Region No. 9 Xavier nearly knocks off regional and national No. 1 Ohio State, which requires a three-pointer from Ron Lewis to send the game into overtime. The Buckeyes win the battle of Ohio, 78–71.
    - UCLA, Georgetown, North Carolina and Texas A&M also advance to the Sweet 16.
  - Opening round of the NCAA women's basketball tournament
    - The biggest upset of Day One saw Marist, the 13th seed in the Dayton Region, shock 4th-seeded Ohio State in a subregional at Palo Alto, California, 67–63. The Red Foxes, a member of the MAAC, gave their conference their first tourney win in 22 attempts.
- Boxing – at Mandalay Bay, Las Vegas:
  - WBC Super-Featherweight Championship: (Mexico) Juan Manuel Márquez def. (Mexico) Marco Antonio Barrera (C) via unanimous decision.
  - USBA Junior Welterweight Championship: (United States) Demetrius Hopkins def. (United States) Steve Forbes (C) via unanimous decision.
  - WBO and IBA Junior Featherweight Championship: (Mexico) Daniel Ponce de León (C) def. (Philippines) Gerry Peñalosa via unanimous decision.
- Cricket:
  - 2007 Cricket World Cup Group Stage
    - Group B: Bangladesh 192/5 (48.3 ov.) beat India 191 (49.3 ov.) by 5 wickets
    - Group D: Ireland 133/7 (revised total (D/L):128 from 47 ov.)(41.4 0v.) beat Pakistan 132 (45.4 ov.) by 3 wickets.
      Pakistan are out of the tournament and Ireland is almost assured a place in the super eights. This is the first world cup victory for Ireland.
- Football (soccer):
  - In a historic first, Tottenham Hotspur goalkeeper Paul Robinson scored a goal in a Premier League match against Watford on an 80-yard free kick, as the ball took a bad hop past Ben Foster, the Hornets' keeper and Robinson's English national teammate as the Spurs won the match, 3–1. The other goalkeepers who scored in a Premier League game – Peter Schmeichel for Aston Villa in 2001 and Brad Friedel for Blackburn Rovers in 2004 – lost their matches.
- Rugby union:
  - 2007 Six Nations
    - Italy 24 – 51 Ireland
    - France 46 – 19 Scotland
    - Wales 27 – 18 England
      The 2007 Six Nations Championship is settled by extra-time tries by Italy and France, which deprived Ireland of the title in favour of France because of points difference. England could still have won the title if they had beaten Wales by 57 clear points – but Wales were determined not to be whitewashed for the second time in three years.
- Tennis
  - 2007 WTA Tour:
    - Pacific Life Open in Indian Wells, California:
      Final: (14) Daniela Hantuchová (Slovakia) d. (2) Svetlana Kuznetsova (Russia) 6–3 6–4.

== 16 March 2007 (Friday) ==
- Basketball:
  - The completion of the NCAA men's tournament first round.
    - In what many considered an upset, Winthrop, the 11th seed in the Midwest region, defeated sixth-seeded Notre Dame 74–64 in Spokane, Washington.
  - NBA:
    - Kobe Bryant scores 61 points, the third time he has scored 60 points or more in a game, as the Los Angeles Lakers defeat the Portland Trail Blazers, 116–111 in overtime.
- Cricket
  - 2007 Cricket World Cup Group Stage
    - Group C: England209/7(50 ov.)lost to New Zealand210/4(41 ov.)by 4 wickets
    - Group A: South Africa353/3(40/40 ov.)beat Netherlands132/9(40/40 ov.)by 221 runs
      - South Africa has the record for the most sixes in an innings with 18
      - Herschelle Gibbs is the first ever batsman to hit six sixes in an over in International Cricket
      - Mark Boucher hit the fastest fifty in World Cup history in 21 balls
  - Bangladesh's Manjural Islam dies at 22 in a road accident in Bangladesh after the end of a days play at a first class match. He is now the youngest Test cricketer to die. He is also the first Bangladeshi bowler to take a wicket in his first international over by getting the wicket of Michael Vaughan with his 3rd ball.

== 15 March 2007 (Thursday) ==
- Baseball:
  - Bowie Kuhn, commissioner of baseball from 1969 to 1984, died from complications of pneumonia at age 80.
- Basketball:
  - College Basketball: 2007 NCAA men's tournament begins.
    - In the first upset of the tournament, Virginia Commonwealth, seeded 11th in the West Region, beats sixth-seeded Duke, 79–77, on Eric Maynor's last-second shot. It is the Blue Devils' earliest exit since 1996.
- Football (soccer):
  - 2006–07 UEFA Cup Round of 16, second leg (aggregate score in parentheses, winners in bold).
    - (Netherlands) **AZ Alkmaar** 2–0 Newcastle (England) (4–4; AZ Alkmaar advances on away goals)
    - (Spain) **Espanyol** 4–0 Maccabi Haifa (Israel) (0–0) (aggregate: 4–0)
    - (Ukraine) Shakhtar Donetsk 2–3 (aet) **Sevilla (Spain)** (2–2) (aggregate: 4–5)
    - (Portugal) **Benfica** 3–1 Paris Saint-Germain (France) (1–2) (aggregate: 4–3)
- Cricket
  - 2007 Cricket World Cup Group Stage
    - Group B: Sri Lanka 321/6 (50 ov.) beat Bermuda 78 (24.4 ov.) by 243 runs. 4th time in World Cup history that a team has lost by a margin of more than 200 runs. Scotland lost to Australia by 203 runs earlier in the tournament.
    - Group D: Ireland 221/9 (50 ov.) tied Zimbabwe 221 all out (50 ov.). Only the 3rd time in World Cup history that a match has been tied.

== 14 March 2007 (Wednesday) ==
- Basketball:
  - The NBA's Milwaukee Bucks fired coach Terry Stotts and replaced him for the remainder of the season with assistant coach Larry Krystkowiak, known as "Special K" in his playing days at the University of Montana, effective with the March 15 contest against the San Antonio Spurs.
- Football (Soccer)
  - 2006–07 UEFA Cup Round of 16, second leg (first leg in parentheses, winners in bold).
    - (Germany) **Werder Bremen** 2–0 Celta Vigo (Spain) (1–0) (aggregate: 3–0)
    - (England) **Tottenham** 3–2 Sporting Braga (Portugal) (3–2) (aggregate: 6–4)
    - (Spain) **Osasuna** 1–0 Rangers (Scotland) (1–1) (aggregate: 2–1)
    - (Germany) **Bayer Leverkusen** 3–0 Lens (France) (1–2) (aggregate: 4–2)
  - Valenica and Inter Milan were fined €106,000 for their fracas following their second leg in the Champions League match. Valencia's David Navarro, whose punch started the brawl, was suspended for seven months, which could also include La Liga and FIFA matches as well. Three others from Valencia and two from Inter Milan were also suspended from between two and six UEFA sanctioned matches.
- Cricket
  - 2007 Cricket World Cup Group Stage
    - Group A: Australia 334/6(50 ov.) beat Scotland 131(40.1 ov.) by 203 runs.
      - It is the third time in world cup history that a team has won by a margin of 200+ runs. First was England beating India in 1975 and then Australia beating Namibia in 2003.
    - Group C: Kenya 203/3(43.2 ov.) beat Canada 199(50 ov.) by 7 wickets
    - James Anderson of the English cricket team has injured his pinky finger on his left hand two days before England's first match. Actions by the ECB will be decided later in the week.

== 13 March 2007 (Tuesday) ==
- Ice hockey:
  - The Dallas Stars' Mike Modano scores his 500th NHL goal against the Philadelphia Flyers in a 3–2 win.
  - The Commonwealth of Pennsylvania and the Pittsburgh Penguins agree to build a new arena in Pittsburgh with $270 million (US) from casino revenues, thus ending speculation of the franchise leaving following the season.
- Basketball:
  - NCAA men's tournament Play-in Game:
    - Niagara 77, Florida A&M 69 (at Dayton, Ohio)
  - NBA:
    - The Charlotte Bobcats announce that Bernie Bickerstaff will be relieved of head coaching duties following this season.
- Cricket:
  - 2007 Cricket World Cup Group Stage
    - Group D: West Indies 241/9(50 ov.) beat Pakistan 187 (47.2 ov.) by 54 runs.
- Dogsled racing:
  - Iditarod XXXV:
    - (United States) Lance Mackey wins the Iditarod at 8:08:41 pm AKDT (UTC−8) with time of 9 days, 5 hours, 8 minutes, and 41 seconds. He is the first musher to win the 1,000 mile (1,609 km) Yukon Quest and the Iditarod in the same year.

== 12 March 2007 (Monday) ==
- College Basketball:
  - The top seeds for the NCAA women's basketball tournament are Duke (Greensboro), Connecticut (Fresno), North Carolina (Dallas) and Tennessee (Dayton).

== 11 March 2007 (Sunday) ==
- Football (soccer):
  - 2006–07 FA Cup, quarterfinals:
    - Chelsea 3–3 Tottenham Hotspur
    - Blackburn Rovers 2–0 Manchester City
    - Plymouth Argyle 0–1 Watford
- Rugby union:
  - 2007 Six Nations:
    - England 26 – 18 France
      A first loss for France in the 2007 Six Nations tournament throws the championship race wide open, with France, Ireland, England and Italy all entering the final week with mathematical chances of an overall win. (BBC)
- Auto racing:
  - NASCAR NEXTEL Cup:
    - UAW-DaimlerChrysler 400 at Las Vegas, Nevada:
      (1) Jimmie Johnson (2) Jeff Gordon (3) Denny Hamlin
- Basketball:
  - College Basketball:
    - The top seeds for the NCAA men's basketball tournament are defending champion Florida (Midwest), North Carolina (East), Ohio State (South) and Kansas (West).
    - NCAA men's conference finals:
      (home teams listed in italics, tournament winning teams in **boldface**)
      - ACC: (8) **North Carolina** 89, NC State 80 at Tampa, Florida
      - Big 10: (1) **Ohio State** 66, (3) Wisconsin 49 at Chicago, Illinois
      - Big 12: (2) **Kansas** 88, (15) Texas 84 (OT) at Oklahoma City, Oklahoma
      - SEC: (6) **Florida** 77, Arkansas 56 at Atlanta, Georgia
      - Southland: **Texas A&M-CC** 81, Northwestern State 78 at Houston, Texas
    - NCAA women's conference finals:
      - America East: **UMBC** 48, Hartford 46 at Vestal, New York
      - Colonial: **Old Dominion** 78, James Madison 70 at Newark, Delaware
      - Horizon: (22) **Wisconsin–Green Bay** 91, Butler 64
      - Missouri Valley: **Drake** 65, Creighton 64 (OT)

== 10 March 2007 (Saturday) ==
- Football (soccer):
  - 2006–07 FA Cup, quarterfinals:
    - Middlesbrough 2–2 Manchester United
- Rugby union:
  - 2007 Six Nations
    - Scotland 18 – 19 Ireland
      Ireland win their second consecutive Triple Crown and third in four years. (BBC)
    - Italy 23 – 20 Wales
      The Azzurri win consecutive Six Nations matches for the first time. (BBC)
- Basketball:
  - NCAA men's college basketball
    - Conference tournament finals:
      (home teams listed in italics, tournament winning teams in **boldface**)
      - America East: **Albany** 60, Vermont 59
      - Atlantic 10: **George Washington** 78, Rhode Island 69 at Atlantic City, New Jersey
      - Big East: (9) **Georgetown** 65, (13) Pittsburgh 42 at New York City
      - Big West: **Long Beach State** 94, Cal Poly 83 at Anaheim, California
      - Conference USA: (5) **Memphis** 71, Houston 59
      - MAC: **Miami (OH)** 53, Akron 52 at Cleveland, Ohio
      - MEAC: **Florida A&M** 58, Delaware State 56 at Raleigh, North Carolina
      - Mountain West: (25) **UNLV** 78, (23) Brigham Young 70
      - Pacific-10: (16) **Oregon** 81, Southern California 57 at Los Angeles, California
      - SWAC: **Jackson State** 81, Mississippi Valley State 71 at Birmingham, Alabama
      - WAC: **New Mexico State** 72, Utah State 70
    - Conference Tournament Semis:
      - ACC at Tampa, Florida:
        - (8) North Carolina 71, Boston College 56
        - NC State 72, Virginia Tech 64
      - Big 10 at Chicago:
        - (1) Ohio State 63, Purdue 52
        - (3) Wisconsin 53, Illinois 41
      - Big 12 Tournament at Oklahoma City:
        - (2) Kansas 67, Kansas State 61
        - (15) Texas 69, Oklahoma State 64
      - SEC at Atlanta:
        - (6) Florida 80 Mississippi 59
        - Arkansas 81, Mississippi State 72
    - Winona State sets an all-time record for NCAA Division II with its 53rd straight win, a 100–73 rout of St. Cloud State in the first round of the Division II national tournament. (AP via ESPN)
  - NCAA women's college basketball
    - Conference tournament finals:
      - Atlantic Sun: **Belmont** 69, East Tennessee State 57 at Dothan, Alabama
      - Big 12: (11) **Oklahoma** 67, Iowa State 60 at Oklahoma City, Oklahoma
      - Big Sky: **Idaho State** 84, Northern Arizona 78 at Missoula, Montana
      - Big South: **UNC Asheville** 67, Radford 57
      - Big West: **UC Riverside** 70, UCSB 67 at Anaheim, California
      - MAC: (20) **Bowling Green** 67, Ball State 53 at Cleveland, Ohio
      - MEAC: **Delaware State** 55, Morgan State 42 at Raleigh, North Carolina
      - Mountain West: **New Mexico** 63, Brigham Young 49 at Las Vegas, Nevada
      - Northeast: **Robert Morris** 68, Sacred Heart 66
      - Southland: **UT Arlington** 68, Stephen F. Austin 47 at Houston, Texas
      - SWAC: **Prairie View A&M** 68, Jackson State 62 at Birmingham, Alabama
      - WAC: **Boise State** 49, New Mexico State 46

== 9 March 2007 (Friday) ==
- Basketball:
  - NCAA men's conference tournaments:
    (home teams listed in italics, tournament winning teams in **boldface**)
    - Patriot League, Final at Worcester, Massachusetts:
      - **Holy Cross** 74, Bucknell 66.
    - Big 10, quarterfinals at Chicago:
      - (1) Ohio State 72, Michigan 62
      - (3) Wisconsin 70, Michigan State 57
    - Big 12, quarterfinals at Oklahoma City:
      - (2) Kansas 64, Oklahoma 47
      - Oklahoma State 57, (7) Texas A&M 56
      - (15) Texas 74, Baylor 69
    - Conference USA, semifinals at Memphis:
      - (5) Memphis 71, Tulsa 49
    - SEC, quarterfinals at Atlanta:
      - (6) Florida 74, Georgia 57
    - ACC, quarterfinals at Tampa, Florida:
      - (8) North Carolina 73, Florida State 58
    - Big East, semifinals at New York City:
      - (9) Georgetown 84, (20) Notre Dame 82
      - (13) Pittsburgh 65, (12) Louisville 59
    - WAC, semifinals at Las Cruces, New Mexico:
      - Utah State 79, (10) Nevada 77
    - Pacific-10, semifinals at Los Angeles:
      - Southern California 70, (11) Washington State 61
      - (16) Oregon 81, California 63
    - Mountain West, semifinals at Las Vegas, Nevada:
      - (23) Brigham Young 96, Wyoming 84
      - (25) UNLV 88, Colorado State 72
- Ice hockey:
  - The National Hockey League suspends Chris Simon of the New York Islanders indefinitely for a violent hit on Ryan Hollweg of the New York Rangers. Two days later, the suspension became 25 games (in essence, the remainder of the Islanders' regular season games). (New York Times)
- Cricket:
  - World Cup warm-up matches:
    - India 86/1 (18.3 ov.) beat West Indies 85 (25.5 ov.) by 9 wickets.
    - Australia 200/5 (40.5 ov.) beat England 197 (48.3 ov.) by 5 wickets
    - Pakistan 200/3 (44.3 ov.) beat South Africa 199 (48.3 ov.) by 7 wickets
    - New Zealand 285/8 (50 ov.) beat Sri Lanka 267 (50.2 ov.) by 18 runs

== 8 March 2007 (Thursday) ==
- Football (soccer):
  - 2006–07 UEFA Cup Round of 16, first leg.
    - (England) Newcastle 4–2 AZ Alkmaar (Netherlands)
    - (Israel) Maccabi Haifa 0–0 Espanyol (Spain)
    - (Scotland) Rangers 1–1 Osasuna (Spain)
    - (Portugal) Sporting Braga 2–3 Tottenham (England)
    - (Spain) Sevilla 2–2 Shakhtar Donetsk (Ukraine)
    - (France) Lens 2–1 Bayer Leverkusen (Germany)
    - (France) Paris Saint-Germain 2–1 Benfica (Portugal)
    - (Spain) Celta Vigo 0–1 Werder Bremen (Germany)
- Cricket:
  - World Cup warm-up matches:
    - Ireland 116/3 (26.5 ov.) beat Canada 115 (32.5 ov.) by 7 wickets.
    - Kenya 274/8 (50 ov.) beat Netherlands 265/9 (50 ov.) by 9 runs.
    - Bangladesh 156/3 (34.1 ov.) beat Scotland 152/9 (50 ov.) by 7 wickets.
    - Zimbabwe 137/7 (29 ov.) beat Bermuda 136 (50 ov.) by 3 wickets.
- Basketball:
  - Euroleague:
    - In Top 16 Group F, Panathinaikos (Greece) defeat Efes Pilsen (Turkey) 79–65 away. Winterthur FCB (Spain) defeat Prokom Trefl Sopot (Poland) 77–59 away. Panathinaikos and Barcelona clinch quarterfinal berths, Efes and Prokom are eliminated from quarterfinal contention. (Euroleague) (Euroleague)
    - In Top 16 Group G, Dynamo Moscow (Russia) eliminate Aris TT Bank (Greece) with a 71–69 home win, though they do not clinch a quarterfinal berth. (Euroleague)
  - Israel women's state cup final:
    - Elitzur Ramla 73, Anda Ramat Hasharon 68.
  - NCAA men's conference tournaments:
    (home teams listed in italics, tournament winning teams in **boldface**)
    - Pacific-10, quarterfinals at Los Angeles:
      - California 76, (4) UCLA 69 (OT).
      - (11) Washington State 74, Washington 64.
      - (16) Oregon 69, Arizona 50.
    - Conference USA, quarterfinals at Memphis:
      - (5) Memphis 92, Marshall 71.
    - Big East, quarterfinals at Madison Square Garden, New York City:
      - (9) Georgetown 62, Villanova 57.
      - (12) Louisville 82, West Virginia 71 (2 OT).
      - (13) Pittsburgh 89, (18) Marquette 79
      - (20) Notre Dame 89, Syracuse 83.
    - WAC, quarterfinals at Las Cruces, New Mexico:
      - (10) Nevada 88, Idaho 56.
    - ACC, 1st round at Tampa, Florida:
      - Miami (Florida) 67, (17) Maryland 62.
      - North Carolina State 85, (21) Duke 80.
    - SEC, 1st round at Atlanta:
      - LSU 76, (22) Tennessee 67 (OT)
    - Mountain West, quarterfinals at Las Vegas:
      - (23) Brigham Young 77, TCU 64.
      - (25) UNLV 80, Utah 54.
- Dogsled racing
  - Iditarod XXXV:
    - (United States) Lance Mackey arrives at the halfway point in the ghost town of Iditarod in first place at 00:11 AKST.

== 7 March 2007 (Wednesday) ==
- Football (soccer):
  - 2006–07 UEFA Champions League, Last-16 stage, second leg:
    (aggregate score in parentheses)
    - **A.C. Milan** (Italy) 1–0 (aet) Celtic (Scotland) (1–0)
    - Arsenal (England) 1–1 **PSV Eindhoven** (Netherlands) (1–2)
    - **Manchester United** (England) 1–0 Lille (France) (2–0)
    - **Bayern Munich** (Germany) 2–1 Real Madrid (Spain) (4–4; Bayern Munich wins on away goals.)

Bayern Munich's Roy Makaay scores the fastest UCL goal in history – 11 seconds into the match – leading the way into the quarterfinals.

  - AFC Champions League 2007, Group stage, round 1:
    - Group A: Al Rayyan (Qatar) 0–1 Al Wahda (United Arab Emirates)
    - Group A: Al Arabi Kuwait 0–1 Al Zawraa (Iraq)
    - Group B: Al-Hilal (Saudi Arabia) 1–1 Al Kuwait Kaifan
    - Group C: Al Najaf (Iraq) 0–1 Neftchi Farg'ona (Uzbekistan)
    - Group C: Al Karama (Syria) 2–1 Al Saad (Qatar)
    - Group D: Sepahan (Iran) 2–1 Al Ittihad (Syria)
    - Group D: Al Ain FC (United Arab Emirates) 0–2 Al-Shabab (Saudi Arabia)
    - Group E: Urawa Reds (Japan) 3–0 Persik Kediri (Indonesia)
    - Group E: Shanghai Shenhua (China) 1–2 Sydney FC (Australia)
    - Group F: Bangkok University FC (Thailand) 0–0Chunnam Dragons (South Korea)
    - Group F: Arema Malang (Indonesia) 1–3 Kawasaki Frontale (Japan)
    - Group G: Adelaide United (Australia) 0–1 Shandong Luneng (China)
    - Group G: Ilhwa Chunma (South Korea) 4–1 Gach Dong Tam Long An (Vietnam)
- Basketball:
  - NCAA men's college basketball:
    - Conference tournament finals:
      (home teams listed in italics, tournament winning teams in **boldface**)
      - Big Sky: **Weber State** 88, Northern Arizona 80.
      - Northeast: **Central Connecticut** 74, Sacred Heart 70.
    - (18) Marquette 76, St. John's 67 (Big East tournament 1st round at New York City).
  - NCAA women's college basketball:
    - Pokey Chatman resigns unexpectedly as head coach at LSU. Allegations later surface of an inappropriate sexual relationship between her and a former player. The resignation had originally been effective upon the conclusion of the NCAA tournament, but instead took effect on March 8.(ESPN)
    - Conference Tournament Final:
      - Patriot League: **Holy Cross** 56, American 48.
  - Euroleague:
    - TAU Cerámica (Spain) defeat Maccabi Tel Aviv (Israel) 94–73. Combined with Pau-Orthez' (France) 74–69 win over Lottomatica Roma (Italy) , this assures TAU a place in the quarterfinals, and makes TAU the first club to clinch top spot in their group. (Euroleague)
    - CSKA Moscow (Russia) also clinch a quarterfinal berth by defeating DKV Joventut (Spain) 73–65. (Euroleague)

== 6 March 2007 (Tuesday) ==
- Football (soccer):
  - 2006–07 UEFA Champions League, Last-16 stage, second leg:
    (aggregate score in parentheses)
    - **Chelsea** (England) 2 – 1 Porto (Portugal) (3–2)
    - Lyon (France) 0 – 2 **Roma** (Italy) (0–2)
    - **Liverpool** (England) 0 – 1 Barcelona (Spain) (2–2, Liverpool win on away goals)
    - **Valencia** (Spain) 0 – 0 Inter Milan (Italy) (2–2, Valencia win on away goals).

Following the match, both teams rioted on the pitch. UEFA will investigate into this.

- Basketball:
  - 2006-07 NBA season: The Dallas Mavericks, with a 51–9 record, become the first team to qualify for the 2007 NBA Playoffs with a 102–89 win over the New Jersey Nets.
  - NCAA men's college basketball:
    - Conference tournament finals:
      (home teams listed in italics, tournament winning teams in **boldface**)
      - Horizon: **Wright State** 60, (19) Butler 55.
      - Mid-Continent: **Oral Roberts** 71, Oakland 67.
      - Sun Belt: **North Texas** 83, Arkansas State 75, at Lafayette, Louisiana
  - NCAA women's college basketball:
    - Conference tournament finals:
      - Big East: (19) **Rutgers** 55, (2) UConn 47 at Hartford, Connecticut
      - Mid-Continent: **Oral Roberts** 72, Oakland 55.
      - Sun Belt: (16) **Middle Tennessee** 77, Louisiana-Lafayette 67.
    - Texas coach Jody Conradt became the second women's coach to win 900 games (joining Tennessee's Pat Summitt) as her Longhorns beat Missouri, 70–53 in the opening round of the Big 12 Women's Basketball Tournament in Oklahoma City.
- Cricket:
  - World Cup warm-up matches:
    - India 300/9 (50 ov) beat Netherlands 118 (37.5 ov) by 182 runs at Trelawny, Jamaica.
    - Australia 290/7 (50 ov) beat Zimbabwe 184/7 (50 ov) by 106 runs at Kingstown, Saint Vincent and the Grenadines.
    - Pakistan 273/8 (48/48 ov) beat Canada Canada 196 (46.4/48 ov) by 77 runs at Saint Augustine, Trinidad and Tobago.
    - Bangladesh 230/8 (49 ov) beat New Zealand 226 (47.2 ov) by 2 wickets (with 6 balls remaining) at Bridgetown, Barbados.

== 5 March 2007 (Monday) ==
- Basketball:
  - NBA: Sacramento Kings star Ron Artest is arrested on domestic violence charges. The Kings respond immediately, suspending Artest indefinitely. (ESPN)
  - NCAA men's college basketball:
    - Conference tournament finals:
      (home teams listed in italics, tournament winning teams in **boldface**)
      - MAAC: **Niagara** 83, Siena 79 at Bridgeport, Connecticut
      - CAA: **Virginia Commonwealth** 65, George Mason 59, at Richmond, Virginia
      - West Coast: **Gonzaga** 77, Santa Clara 68 at Portland, Oregon
    - Winthrop enters the AP Poll Top-25 for the first time at #24.
  - NCAA women's college basketball:
    - Conference tournament finals:
      - Atlantic 10: **Xavier** 65, Saint Joseph's 59.
      - Big 10: (12) **Purdue** 64, (5) Ohio State 52, at Indianapolis.
      - Pacific-10: (6) **Stanford** 62, (8) Arizona State 55 at San Jose, California.
    - (2) UConn 76, (23) Louisville 50.
    - (19) Rutgers 63, (21) Marquette 55
- Cricket:
  - World Cup warm-up matches:
    - England 286/8 (50 ov.) beat Bermuda 45 (22.2 ov.) by 241 runs at Kingstown, Saint Vincent.
    - South Africa 192 (50 ov) beat Ireland 157 (44.2 ov) by 35 runs at Saint Augustine, Trinidad and Tobago.
    - Sri Lanka 294/7 (50 ov) beat Scotland 124 (41.2 ov) by 159 runs at Bridgetown, Barbados.
    - West Indies 268/5 (50 ov) beat Kenya 247/7 (50.0 ov) by 21 runs at Trelawny, Jamaica.

== 4 March 2007 (Sunday) ==
- Auto racing:
  - Colombia-born Juan Pablo Montoya becomes the first driver not born in North America to win a NASCAR Busch Series race winning the Telcel Motorola 200 at Autodromo Hermanos Rodriguez in Mexico City.
- Basketball:
  - NCAA Men's college basketball:
    - Conference tournament finals:
      (home teams listed in italics, tournament winning teams in **boldface**)
      - Missouri Valley: **Creighton** 67, (11) Southern Illinois 61 at St. Louis, Missouri
    - (5) Florida 85, Kentucky 72. Florida becomes the first SEC team ever to win six consecutive games against the Wildcats, the conference's traditional basketball superpower.
    - (8) North Carolina 86, (14) Duke 72
    - Clemson 75, (21) Virginia Tech 74. The Hokies loss, combined with the Tar Heels victory, clinches the ACC regular season title for North Carolina.
  - NCAA Women's college basketball:
    - Conference tournament finals:
      - ACC: (4) **North Carolina** 60, (24) NC State 54, at Greensboro, North Carolina.
      - SEC: (13) **Vanderbilt** 51, (11) LSU 45, at Duluth, Georgia.
      - Conference USA: **East Carolina** 79, Rice 70, at Tulsa, Oklahoma.
      - MAAC: **Marist** 64, Iona 57 (OT) at Bridgeport, Connecticut.
      - WCC: **Gonzaga** 64, Loyola Marymount 47 at Portland, Oregon.
    - (3) UConn 74, South Florida 54.
    - (5) Ohio State 73, Penn State 71 (OT).
    - (7) Stanford 67, Southern California 52.
    - Saint Joseph's 57, (8) George Washington 55.
    - (9) Arizona State 60, (25) Cal 53.
  - Philippine Basketball Association 2007 Fiesta Conference Opening Day at the Cuneta Astrodome
    - Red Bull Barako 98, Purefoods Tender Juicy Giants 88
    - Coca-Cola Tigers 81, Welcoat Dragons 79
- Tennis:
  - 2007 ATP Tour:
    - Tennis Channel Open in Las Vegas, Nevada:
      Final: (2) Lleyton Hewitt (Australia) def (4) Jürgen Melzer (Austria) 6–4 7–6(10).
- Dogsled racing: The Iditarod XXXV restarts in Willow. This marks the beginning of the competitive portion of the race.

== 3 March 2007 (Saturday) ==
- Basketball:
  - NCAA men's college basketball:
    - Conference tournament finals:
      (home teams listed in italics, tournament winning teams in **boldface**)
      - Atlantic Sun: **Belmont** 92, East Tennessee State 67.
      - Big South: **Winthrop** 84, VMI 81.
      - Ohio Valley: **Eastern Kentucky** 63, Austin Peay 62 at Nashville, Tennessee.
      - Southern: **Davidson** 72, College of Charleston 65 at North Charleston, South Carolina.
    - (1) Ohio State 65, Michigan 61.
    - Washington 61, (2) UCLA 51.
    - (3) Kansas 90, (15) Texas 86
    - (4) Wisconsin 52, Michigan State 50.
    - (6) Memphis 64, SMU 61.
    - (7) Texas A&M 94, Missouri 78.
    - (9) Georgetown 59, Connecticut 46.
    - (10) Nevada 69, New Mexico State 63.
    - (11) Southern Illinois 53, Bradley 51.
    - (20) Marquette 75, (12) Pittsburgh 71.
    - (13) Washington State 88, (23) Southern California 86 (2 OT).
    - (18) Butler 67, Loyola Chicago 61 (OT).
    - Arkansas 82, (19) Vanderbilt 67.
  - NCAA women's college basketball:
    - The top two teams in the AP poll fell in their conference tournaments. Top-ranked Duke lost for the first time this season, going down 70–65 to NC State in the ACC tournament semifinals, while second-ranked Tennessee fell in the SEC semis to LSU 63–54.
    - (4) North Carolina 78, (6) Maryland 72.
    - (7) Stanford 65, Arizona 55.
    - (8) George Washington 61, Dayton 45.
    - (9) Arizona State 74, UCLA 64.
    - (13) Vanderbilt 81, (10) Georgia 56.
    - Conference tournament finals:
      - Ohio Valley: **Southeast Missouri** 62, Murray State 60 at Nashville, Tennessee.
      - Southern: **Chattanooga** 84, Western Carolina 66 at North Charleston, South Carolina.
- Tennis:
  - 2007 ATP Tour:
    - Dubai Tennis Championships in Dubai, UAE:
      Final: (1) Roger Federer (Switzerland) def Mikhail Youzhny (Russia) 6–4 6–3.
    - Abierto Mexicano TELCEL in Acapulco, Mexico:
      Final: (4) Juan Ignacio Chela (Argentina) def (8) Carlos Moyá (Spain) 6–3 7–6.
  - 2007 WTA Tour:
    - Qatar Total Open in Doha, Qatar:
      Final: (1) Justine Henin (Belgium) def (2) Svetlana Kuznetsova (Russia) 6–4 6–2.
    - Abierto Mexicano TELCEL in Acapulco, Mexico:
      Final: Émilie Loit (France) def (5)Flavia Pennetta (Italy) 7–6 6–4.
- Cycling:
  - Omloop "Het Volk":
    - Filippo Pozzato (Italy) wins the sprint of a 5-man group in front of Juan Antonio Flecha (Spain) , Tom Boonen (Belgium) , Nick Nuyens (Belgium) and Stuart O'Grady (Australia) .
- Dogsled racing: The ceremonial start the Iditarod XXXV begins in Anchorage, Alaska. Eighty-two mushers and their teams of dogs are competing. The race runs more than 1,049 mi (1,600+ km) to Nome, across the United States state of Alaska.

== 2 March 2007 (Friday) ==
- Football (soccer):
  - FIFA announces that the following national federations have officially expressed an interest in hosting the FIFA Women's World Cup 2011: Australia, Canada, France, Germany, Peru, and Switzerland. The host country will be announced on 31 August 2007. (FIFA)
- Basketball:
  - Men's college basketball:
    - Penn 86, Yale 58. The Quakers officially clinch the first berth in the NCAA men's tournament clinching the Ivy League championship, the only conference without a season-ending conference tournament.
    - (11) Southern Illinois 71, Drake 59.
  - Women's college basketball:
    - Harvard 64, Cornell 48. The Crimson clinch the Ivy League championship and clinch the first berth in the NCAA women's tournament.
- Ice hockey:
  - NHL: Sidney Crosby of the Pittsburgh Penguins scores a goal against the Carolina Hurricanes to become the youngest player to record 200 points. (Yahoo sports)

== 1 March 2007 (Thursday) ==
- Basketball
  - NBA: Steve Patterson resigns as president of the Portland Trail Blazers. He will be replaced temporarily by Seattle Seahawks CEO Tod Leiweke. Both franchises are owned by Paul Allen.
  - US men's college basketball:
    - (2) UCLA 53, (13) Washington State 45
    - (6) Memphis 78, UTEP 76
    - Georgia Tech 84, (8) North Carolina 77
    - Utah State 79, (10) Nevada 77 (OT)
    - Virginia 69, (21) Virginia Tech 56
    - Washington 85, (23) Southern California 70
