= 2006–07 Euroleague quarterfinals =

The quarterfinals of the 2006-07 Euroleague were the third of four stages of the annual Europe-wide club basketball competition.

Each quarterfinal was a best-of-three series between a first-place team in the Top 16 and a second-place team from a different group, with the first-place team receiving home advantage. Quarterfinals were played on April 3 and April 5, 2007, with third games played April 12 if necessary.

The winning teams advanced to the Final Four, held May 4 through May 6, 2007 at the Olympic Indoor Hall in Athens.

Group D 1st	Group E 2nd
Group E 1st	Group D 2nd
Group F 1st	Group G 2nd
Group G 1st	Group F 2nd
Team on left holds the home advantage

== Quarterfinal 1 ==
=== Results ===
First Game
TAU Cerámica (Spain)	84-59	Olympiacos (Greece)
Venue: Fernando Buesa Arena, Vitoria-Gasteiz, April 3
Points:	24 - Igor Rakočević (Serbia)	TAU Cerámica
Rebounds:	9 - Luis Scola (Argentina) (DEF - 7, OFF - 2)	TAU Cerámica
Assists:	4 - Zoran Planinić (Croatia)	TAU Cerámica

Second Game
Olympiacos (Greece)	89-95	TAU Cerámica (Spain)
Venue: Peace and Friendship Stadium, Athens, April 5
Points:	20 - Luis Scola (Argentina)	TAU Cerámica
Rebounds:	13 - Ioannis Bourousis (Greece) (DEF - 9, OFF - 4)	Olympiacos
Assists:	5 - Scoonie Penn (United States)	Olympiacos

=== Statistics ===
Total score: TAU Cerámica 179–148 Olympiacos.

Leading scorer: 41 points - Igor Rakočević (Serbia) , TAU Cerámica (1st game - 24 po., 2nd game - 17 po.)

Leading rebounder: 19 rebounds (DEF - 14, OFF - 5) - Luis Scola (Argentina) , TAU Cerámica (1st game - 9 reb., 2nd game - 10 reb.)

Assists leader: 8 assists - Scoonie Penn (United States) , Olympiacos (1st game - 3 ass., 2nd game - 5 ass.)

Leading shot blocker: 3 blocks - Luis Scola (Argentina) , TAU Cerámica (2nd game - 3 blocks).

Steals leader: 5 steals - 5 players.

== Quarterfinal 2 ==
=== Results ===
First Game
CSKA Moscow (Russia)	80-58	Maccabi Tel Aviv (Israel)
Venue: CSKA Universal Sports Hall, Moscow, April 3
Points:	16 - Trajan Langdon (United States)	CSKA Moscow
Rebounds:	10 - Oscar Torres (Venezuela) (DEF - 8, OFF - 2)	CSKA Moscow
Assists:	8 - Theodoros Papaloukas (Greece)	CSKA Moscow

Second Game
Maccabi Tel Aviv (Israel)	68-56	CSKA Moscow (Russia)
Venue: Nokia Arena, Tel Aviv, April 5
Points:	15 - Nikola Vujčić (Croatia)	Maccabi Tel Aviv
Rebounds:	10 - Lior Eliyahu (Israel) (DEF - 6, OFF - 4)	Maccabi Tel Aviv
Assists:	5 - Will Bynum (United States)	Maccabi Tel Aviv

Third Game
CSKA Moscow (Russia)	92-71	Maccabi Tel Aviv (Israel)
Venue: CSKA Universal Sports Hall, Moscow, April 12
Points:	20 - Trajan Langdon (United States)	CSKA Moscow
Rebounds:	6 - Aleksey Savrasenko (Russia) (DEF - 4, OFF - 2)	CSKA Moscow
Assists:	10 - Theodoros Papaloukas (Greece)	CSKA Moscow

=== Statistics ===
Total score: CSKA Moscow 228–197 Maccabi Tel Aviv.

Leading scorer: 47 points - Trajan Langdon (United States) , CSKA Moscow (1st game - 16 po. 2nd game - 11 po. 3rd game - 20 po.)

Leading rebounder: 23 rebounds (DEF - 18, OFF - 4) - Nikola Vujčić (Croatia) , Maccabi Tel Aviv (1st game - 9 reb. 2nd game - 9 reb. 3rd game - 4 reb.)

Assists leader: 21 assists - Theodoros Papaloukas (Greece) , CSKA Moscow (1st game - 8 ass. 2nd game - 3 ass. 3rd game - 10 ass.)

Leading shot blocker: 4 blocks - Thomas van den Spiegel (Belgium) , CSKA Moscow (1st game - 2 blocks, 3rd game - 2 blocks).

Steals leader: 6 steals - 2 players.

== Quarterfinal 3 ==
=== Results ===
First Game
Panathinaikos (Greece)	80-58	Dynamo Moscow (Russia)
Venue: Olympic Indoor Hall, Athens, April 3
Points:	17 - Sani Bečirovič (Slovenia)	Panathinaikos
Rebounds:	7 - Lazaros Papadopoulos (Greece) (DEF - 5, OFF - 2)	Dynamo Moscow
Assists:	6 - Dimitris Diamantidis (Greece)	Panathinaikos

Second Game
Dynamo Moscow (Russia)	65-73	Panathinaikos (Greece)
Venue: Krylatskoe Sport Palace, Moscow, April 5
Points:	19 - Ramūnas Šiškauskas (Lithuania)	Panathinaikos
Rebounds:	6 - Ramūnas Šiškauskas (Lithuania) (DEF - 5, OFF - 1); 6 - Lazaros Papadopoulos (Greece) (DEF - 2, OFF - 4)	Panathinaikos Dynamo Moscow.
Assists:	5 - Dmitry Domani (Russia)	Dynamo Moscow.

=== Statistics ===
Total score: Panathinaikos 153–123 Dynamo Moscow.

Leading scorer: 35 points - Ramūnas Šiškauskas (Lithuania) , Panathinaikos (1st game - 16 po. 2nd game - 19 po.)

Leading rebounder: 13 rebounds (DEF - 7, OFF - 6) - Lazaros Papadopoulos (Greece) , Dynamo Moscow (1st game - 7 reb. 2nd game - 6 reb.)

Assists leader: 7 assists - Dimitris Diamantidis (Greece) , Panathinaikos (1st game - 6 ass. 2nd game - 1 ass.)

Leading shot blocker: 4 blocks - Dimitris Diamantidis (Greece) , Panathinaikos (1st game - 3 blocks, 2nd game - 1 block).

Steals leader: 3 steals - 2 players.

== Quarterfinal 4 ==
=== Results ===
First Game
Unicaja Málaga (Spain)	91-75	Winterthur FCB (Spain)
Venue: José María Martín Carpena Arena, Málaga, April 3
Points:	17 - Marcus Faison (United States)	Unicaja Málaga
Rebounds:	8 - Denis Marconato (Italy) (DEF - 4, OFF - 4)	Winterthur FCB
Assists:	7 - Pepe Sánchez (Argentina)	Unicaja Málaga

Second Game
Winterthur FCB (Spain)	80-58	Unicaja Málaga (Spain)
Venue: Palau Blaugrana, Barcelona, April 5
Points:	25 - Juan Carlos Navarro (Spain)	Winterthur FCB
Rebounds:	7 - Roger Grimau (Spain) (DEF - 5, OFF - 2)	Winterthur FCB
Assists:	4 - Juan Carlos Navarro (Spain)	Winterthur FCB

Third Game
Unicaja Málaga (Spain)	67-64	Winterthur FCB (Spain)
Venue: José María Martín Carpena Arena, Málaga, April 12
Points:	15 - Marko Tušek (Slovenia)	Unicaja Málaga
Rebounds:	9 - Jordi Trias (Spain) (DEF - 9)	Winterthur FCB
Assists:	4 - Roko Ukić (Croatia); 4 - Jaka Lakovič (Slovenia)	Winterthur FCB; Winterthur FCB

=== Statistics ===
Total score: Unicaja Málaga 216–219 Winterthur FCB.

Leading scorer: 49 points - Juan Carlos Navarro (Spain) , Winterthur FCB (1st game - 15 po. 2nd game - 25 po. 3rd game - 9 po.)

Leading rebounder: 20 rebounds (DEF - 15, OFF - 5) - Jordi Trias (Spain) , Winterthur FCB (1st game - 5 reb. 2nd game - 6 reb. 3rd - 9 reb.)

Assists leader: 10 assists - 2 players.

Leading shot blocker: 4 blocks - Iñaki de Miguel (Spain) , Unicaja Málaga (2nd game - 1 block, 3rd game - 3 blocks).

Steals leader: 4 steals - 2 players.
