= Bojan Popović =

Serbian basketball player

Personal information
- Born: February 13, 1983 (age 43) Belgrade, SR Serbia, SFR Yugoslavia
- Listed height: 6 ft 3 in (1.91 m)
- Listed weight: 190 lb (86 kg)

Career information
- NBA draft: 2005: undrafted
- Playing career: 2001–2015
- Position: Point guard

Career history
- 2001–2005: FMP Železnik
- 2005–2007: Dynamo Moscow
- 2007–2008: Unicaja Malaga
- 2008–2009: San Sebastian Bruesa
- 2009–2010: Lietuvos rytas
- 2010: Efes Pilsen
- 2010–2011: Cajasol Sevilla
- 2011: Meridiano Alicante
- 2011–2012: Crvena zvezda
- 2013: Lukoil Academic
- 2014: CSU Asesoft Ploieşti
- 2015: Trefl Sopot

Career highlights
- ULEB Cup champion (2006); Bulgarian League champion (2013); Adriatic League champion (2004); 2× Radivoj Korać Cup champion (2003, 2005)
Medals
Representing Serbia and Montenegro
Universiade
Gold medal – first place	2003 Daegu	Team competition
Representing Serbia
FIBA European Championship
Silver medal – second place	2009 Poland	National Team

Bojan Popović (Serbian: Бојан Поповић; born February 13, 1983) is a Serbian former professional basketball player. He also represented the Serbian national basketball team internationally. He is a 1.91 m (6 ft 3 in) tall point guard.

== Professional career ==
Popović is a product of the FMP's youth system. After spending four years as a professional at the club from Belgrade's suburb of Železnik, winning one Serbian Cup and Adriatic League trophy, he signed a contract with Russian PBL team Dynamo Moscow. His good performances led the team to the Euroleague quarterfinals, where they lost to Panathinaikos, which eventually won the cup.

Next season Bojan signed with ACB and Euroleague team Unicaja Malaga and a season later he stayed in Spain, playing for San Sebastian Bruesa.

In summer 2009, Popović signed with Lithuanian club Lietuvos rytas. On November 2, 2009, Popovic won the Euroleague MVP of the Month award for the month of October. Despite his good performances, Lietuvos rytas failed to qualify to the Top 16 and was eliminated from the Euroleague for that season. Nonetheless his abilities earned him a contract with Regular Season Group B rivals Efes Pilsen, but he failed to accomplish his early year performance at the Top 16.

On 25 August 2010, Popovic signed a one-year contract with KK Partizan. However, Partizan broke the contract only 20 days after signing it, because "he did not fit in the concept of playing". On November 22, 2010 he signed a three-month contract with Cajasol Sevilla in Spain. In March 2011 he signed with Meridiano Alicante until the end of the season.

On October 12, 2011 he signed a one-year contract with Crvena zvezda. He finished the year with averages of 7 points and 3.5 assists in the Adriatic league.

In January 2013 he signed with Bulgarian team PBC Lukoil Academic until the end of season. In January 2014, he signed with the Romanian team CSU Asesoft Ploieşti for the rest of the season.

In February 2015, he signed with Trefl Sopot of the Polish Basketball League.

== Serbian national team ==
Popović has also been a member of the senior men's Serbian national team. He played at the EuroBasket 2009, where he won the silver medal.

== Euroleague career statistics ==
Legend
GP	Games played	GS	Games started	MPG	Minutes per game
FG%	Field-goal percentage	3P%	3-point field-goal percentage	FT%	Free-throw percentage
RPG	Rebounds per game	APG	Assists per game	SPG	Steals per game
BPG	Blocks per game	PPG	Points per game	PIR	Performance index rating
**Bold**	Career high

Year	Team	GP	GS	MPG	FG%	3P%	FT%	RPG	APG	SPG	BPG	PPG	PIR
2006–07	Dynamo Moscow	**22**	**22**	25.5	.444	.271	.839	**2.9**	1.9	1.7	.0	10.7	12.8
2007–08	Unicaja Málaga	20	5	15.4	.275	**.303**	.863	1.7	1.5	.5	.0	3.6	3.5
2009–10	Lietuvos rytas	10	9	**32.0**	.353	.265	.833	2.4	**5.4**	**2.4**	**.2**	**11.2**	**13.6**
2009–10	Efes Pilsen	6	0	13.1	**.500**	.000	**.889**	2	1.3	.6	.0	3.3	4.8

== See also ==
- List of Serbia men's national basketball team players
