= Antonis Fotsis =

Greek basketball player (born 1981)

Antonis Fotsis Αντώνης Φώτσης
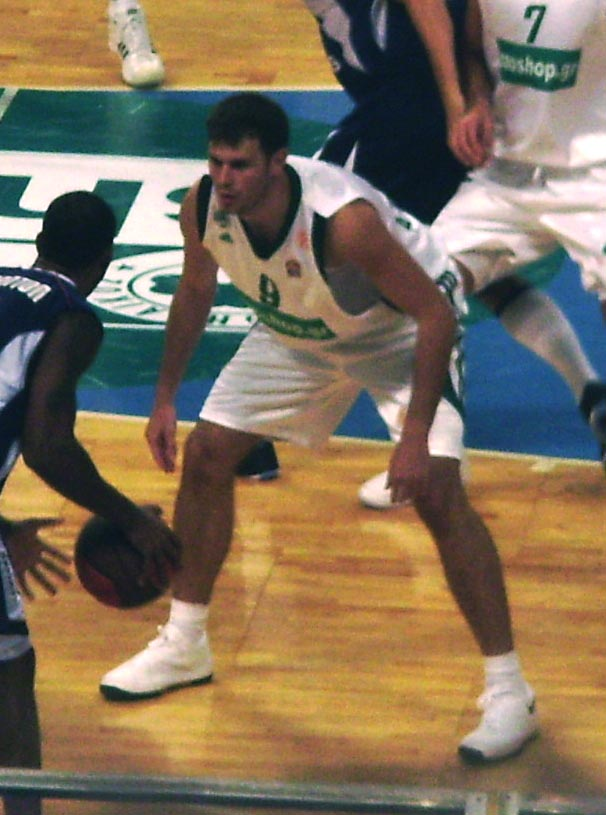
- Fotsis, as a Panathinaikos player, in 2008

No. 6 – Ilysiakos
- Position: Power forward
- League: Greek C League

Personal information
- Born: 1 April 1981 (age 45) Maroussi, Greece
- Listed height: 6 ft 10.25 in (2.09 m)
- Listed weight: 250 lb (113 kg)

Career information
- NBA draft: 2001: 2nd round, 48th overall pick
- Drafted by: Vancouver Grizzlies
- Playing career: 1996–present

Career history
- 1996–1997: Ilysiakos
- 1997–2001: Panathinaikos
- 2001–2002: Memphis Grizzlies
- 2002–2003: Panathinaikos
- 2003–2005: Real Madrid
- 2005–2008: Dynamo Moscow
- 2008–2011: Panathinaikos
- 2011–2013: Olimpia Milano
- 2013–2017: Panathinaikos
- 2017–present: Ilysiakos

Career highlights
- 3× EuroLeague champion (2000, 2009, 2011); FIBA EuroStar (2007); EuroCup champion (2006); Liga ACB champion (2005); LBA All-Star (2012); 10× Greek League champion (1998–2001, 2003, 2009–2011, 2014, 2017); 6× Greek Cup winner (2003, 2009, 2014–2017); Greek All-Star Game MVP (2011); 6× Greek All-Star (2001, 2003, 2009–2011, 2014); Greek League Best Young Player (2001); Greek League Hall of Fame (2022); 3× Acropolis Tournament MVP (2002, 2008, 2011); EuroLeague records since the 2000–01 season: Most rebounds in a game
- Stats at NBA.com
- Stats at Basketball Reference
Medals
Event	1st	2nd	3rd
FIBA World Cup	0	1	0
FIBA Stanković World Cup	1	0	0
FIBA EuroBasket	1	0	1
FIBA U-18 European Championship	0	0	1
Total	2	1	2
Men's basketball
Representing Greece
FIBA World Cup
Silver medal – second place	2006 Japan	
FIBA Stanković World Cup
Gold medal – first place	2006 China	
FIBA EuroBasket
Gold medal – first place	2005 Serbia & Montenegro	
Bronze medal – third place	2009 Poland	
FIBA Europe Under-18 Championship
Bronze medal – third place	1998 Bulgaria	U-18 Team

Antonis Fotsis (alternate spellings: Adonis, Antonios, Greek: Αντώνης Φώτσης; born 1 or 2 April 1981) is a Greek professional basketball player for Ilysiakos. His height is of 2.09-metre (6 ft 10 1/4 in) tall. During his professional career he was also the captain of the senior Greek national team. In most of his playing career, he played primarily as a power forward, but he could also sometimes be used as a small ball center, or even as a small forward, if needed. Fotsis was inducted into the Greek Basket League Hall of Fame in 2022.

== Professional career ==
=== Europe ===
Born in Maroussi, Athens, Fotsis began his career as one of the biggest European prospects. Fotsis began his professional career in 1996, with the Greek League club Ilysiakos. He quickly earned a reputation as a very talented young player when playing in the club's senior team. He then transferred to the Greek club Panathinaikos (PAO) in 1997, just at the age of sixteen. It is a fact of significant importance that he started his career as a point guard, and later moved to the small forward, and then power forward positions. Due to his early guard playing status, he was later always recognized as one of the best power forwards in Europe, regarding basketball technique. While being the most dominant-youth aged talent in Greece at the time, he twice participated in the Nike Hoop Summit All-World Team (1998, 1999). He got little playing time in his first two seasons with Panathinaikos, but he managed to become one of the team's key players during the 1999–00 season. With Panathinaikos, he won the EuroLeague championship that same season, while being barely nineteen. One year later, he became a starter on the Panathinaikos team that made it to the FIBA SuproLeague's Finals.

=== NBA ===
Fotsis was selected by the Vancouver Grizzlies (who were relocated to Memphis right after the draft) in the 2nd round (48th overall) of the 2001 NBA draft. In his one and only season in the NBA, he appeared in 28 games for the Grizzlies during the 2001–02 NBA season, averaging 3.9 points and 2.2 rebounds per game. He scored a career high 21 points against the Orlando Magic on January 19, 2002. His final NBA game was on April 17, 2002, in a 94–109 loss to the Seattle SuperSonics, in which he recorded 10 points and 6 rebounds.

=== Return to Europe ===
After spending the 2001–02 season in the NBA with the Memphis Grizzlies, he returned to Panathinaikos for the 2002–03 season, and became one of the team's leaders, while scoring an average of 14.5 points per game in EuroLeague. With PAO, he won both the Greek Cup and the Greek League championship that year. In 2003, he moved to the Spanish League club Real Madrid.

With Real Madrid, he was one of the key contributors on the teams that made it to the EuroCup Finals in 2004, and won the Spanish League championship in 2005. In 2005, he then transferred to the Russian Superleague club Dynamo Moscow. With Dynamo Moscow, Fotsis was one of the two leaders of the Russian team, along with fellow Greek player Lazaros Papadopoulos.

Fotsis won the EuroCup championship in 2006 with Dynamo. One year later, he reached the EuroLeague quarterfinals with Dynamo, where his team lost to Panathinaikos. On March 21, 2007, in a winner-take-all EuroLeague 2006–07 season showdown with Italian League power Benetton Treviso, for second place in their Top 16 group, and a place in the quarterfinals, Fotsis scored 22 points, and set a single-game EuroLeague post year 2000 record with 24 rebounds, helping Dynamo score a 68-65 overtime win.

In 2008, he returned to Panathinaikos. It was his second return to the club, and he was in the starting lineup for the team, as they won the coveted Triple Crown during the 2008–09 season. Fotsis was a key contributor to the Triple Crown winners, with his good defensive play and clutch baskets. He also played more minutes than any other "Greens" player in the 2009 EuroLeague Final Four. In the 2009–10 season, Panathinaikos again won the Greek League championship. That same season, Fotsis was named the Greek League MVP for the month of April. He played more minutes than any other "Greens" player in the EuroLeague that season, showing his defensive skills as well.

In July 2011, he signed with Olimpia Milano of the Italian League, for two seasons. On July 2, 2013, Panathinaikos announced that they had signed Fotsis for three seasons. In 2016, Fotsis signed a new two-year contract with Panathinaikos. On July 25, 2017, he parted ways with Panathinaikos.

In August 2017, he announced his return to Ilysiakos, the first team of his professional career back in 1996.

== National team career ==
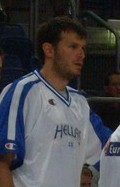
Fotsis, as a member of the senior Greece men's national basketball team.

With the junior national team of Greece, Fotsis won the bronze medal at the 1998 FIBA Europe Under-18 Championship. He played with the senior men's Greek national team at the 2009 EuroBasket, and the 2004 Summer Olympics. He was also a member of the Greek men's national teams that won the gold medal at the 2005 EuroBasket and the silver medal at the 2006 FIBA World Championship.

He also played at the 2008 Summer Olympics, and he became the captain of Greece's senior national team before the 2009 EuroBasket tournament, where Greece won the bronze medal. He was also a member of the Greek men's national teams that played at the 2010 FIBA World Championship, the 2011 EuroBasket, the 2012 FIBA World Olympic Qualifying Tournament, and the 2013 EuroBasket.

He is the 7th all-time leading scorer of the Greek senior men's national team, with 1,734 points scored in his career (9.4 points per game).

== Personal life ==
Fotsis has had the nickname of "Batman" since his adolescent years, when his teammates in the Greek junior national teams named him after the well-known comic-strip figure, because of his ability at that age to be an overwhelmingly gliding presence above the basketball rim.

In his prime, Fotsis was a shot blocker, an offensive rebounder, and an excellent 3-point shooter, especially for a power forward. He was also physical on the defensive end of the court, thanks to his athleticism.

He also holds Turkish citizenship.

== Career statistics ==
Legend
GP	Games played	GS	Games started	MPG	Minutes per game
FG%	Field-goal percentage	3P%	3-point field-goal percentage	FT%	Free-throw percentage
RPG	Rebounds per game	APG	Assists per game	SPG	Steals per game
BPG	Blocks per game	PPG	Points per game	PIR	Performance index rating
**Bold**	Career high

=== NBA ===
==== Regular season ====
Year	Team	GP	GS	MPG	FG%	3P%	FT%	RPG	APG	SPG	BPG	PPG
2001–02	Memphis	28	1	11.4	.404	.304	.850	2.2	.4	.3	.4	3.9
Career		28	1	11.4	.404	.304	.850	2.2	.4	.3	.4	3.9

=== EuroLeague ===
†	Denotes seasons in which Fotsis won the EuroLeague

Year	Team	GP	GS	MPG	FG%	3P%	FT%	RPG	APG	SPG	BPG	PPG	PIR
2002–03	Panathinaikos	20	15	28.2	.510	.467	.885	5.7	**1.1**	**1.3**	.6	**14.4**	16.1
2004–05	Real Madrid	16	6	19.0	.460	.364	.649	3.6	.5	.6	.5	7.3	6.6
2006–07	Dynamo Moscow	22	**22**	**30.5**	.483	.443	.847	**7.0**	.7	1.0	.6	13.8	**17.2**
2008–09†	Panathinaikos	22	9	23.9	.509	.433	.714	4.7	.7	.8	.6	7.2	9.1
2009–10	Panathinaikos	16	13	23.3	.507	.313	.826	5.5	.6	.4	**.7**	6.2	10.7
2010–11†	Panathinaikos	22	16	24.2	.530	.380	.647	5.1	.8	.8	**.7**	8.4	11.6
2011–12	Milano	16	15	24.4	.471	.362	.737	4.9	.9	.6	.4	8.4	9.9
2012–13	Milano	10	10	25.4	.429	.415	**1.000**	4.2	1.0	.6	.1	7.5	8.1
2013–14	Panathinaikos	**29**	12	23.4	.413	.358	.793	4.3	.7	.3	.2	6.0	7.4
2014–15	Panathinaikos	27	11	23.5	**.563**	**.506**	.733	4.1	.8	.4	.2	7.7	9.6
2015–16	Panathinaikos	26	1	16.3	.455	.403	.750	3.0	.3	.6	.1	4.8	6.0
2016–17	Panathinaikos	24	4	12.3	.391	.323	.800	2.4	.2	.1	.1	2.1	3.0
Career		250	134	22.6	.485	.408	.777	4.5	.7	.6	.4	7.7	9.5

== Awards and accomplishments ==
=== Club titles ===
- 3× EuroLeague Champion: (2000, 2009, 2011)
- 10× Greek League Champion: (1998, 1999, 2000, 2001, 2003, 2009, 2010, 2011, 2014, 2017)
- 6× Greek Cup Winner: (2003, 2009, 2014, 2015, 2016, 2017)
  - Triple Crown Winner: (2009)
- Spanish League Champion: (2005)
- EuroCup Champion: (2006)

=== Individual awards ===
- 2× Nike Hoop Summit All-World Team: (1998, 1999)
- Greek League Best Young Player: (2001)
- 4× EuroLeague Player of the Week
- 6× Greek League All-Star: (2001, 2003, 2009, 2010, 2011, 2014)
- FIBA EuroStar: (2007)
- FIBA EuroStars Top Scorer: (2007)
- Greek League All-Star Game MVP: (2011)
- Italian League All-Star: (2012)
- Greek League Hall of Fame: (2022)
- Holds the Euroleague Basketball Company era Single Game Rebounding Record: (24) (only counts games played since the 2000–01 season)

=== Greek junior national team ===
- 1998 FIBA Europe Under-18 Championship: Bronze

=== Greek senior national team ===
- 9× Acropolis Tournament Champion: (2002, 2003, 2005, 2006, 2007, 2008, 2009, 2010, 2013)
- 3× Acropolis Tournament MVP: (2002, 2008, 2011)
- 2005 EuroBasket: Gold
- 2006 Stanković World Cup: Gold
- 2006 FIBA World Championship: Silver
- 2009 EuroBasket: Bronze
