= April 2007 in sports =

| << | April 2007 | | | | | >> |
| Su | Mo | Tu | We | Th | Fr | Sa |
| 1 | 2 | 3 | 4 | 5 | 6 | 7 |
| 8 | 9 | 10 | 11 | 12 | 13 | 14 |
| 15 | 16 | 17 | 18 | 19 | 20 | 21 |
| 22 | 23 | 24 | 25 | 26 | 27 | 28 |
| 29 | 30 |
India; Sports

This list shows notable sports-related deaths, events, and notable outcomes that occurred in April of 2007.

== Deaths ==
- 29: Kevin Mitchell
- 29: Josh Hancock
- 25: Alan Ball
- 23: David Halberstam
- 21: Parry O'Brien
- 5: Darryl Stingley
- 3: Eddie Robinson
- 1: Herb Carneal

== Sporting seasons ==
- Auto racing 2007:
  - Formula One
  - A1 Grand Prix
  - Champ Car
  - NASCAR NEXTEL Cup
  - NASCAR Busch Series
  - NASCAR Craftsman Truck Series
  - World Rally Championship
  - IRL
  - GP2
  - V8 Supercar
  - Rolex Sports Car Series
  - American Le Mans Series
  - FIA GT
  - Le Mans Series
- Baseball 2007
  - Chinese Professional Baseball League (Taiwan)
  - Major League Baseball
- Basketball 2007:
  - Australian National Basketball League
  - Euroleague
  - National Basketball Association
    - NBA Playoffs
  - PBA Fiesta Conference
  - ULEB Cup
- Cricket 2006–07:
  - Australia
  - South Africa
- Cycling
  - UCI ProTour
- Football (soccer) 2006–07:
  - 2006–07 UEFA Champions League
  - 2006–07 UEFA Cup
  - England (general)
    - Premier League 2006-07
  - Scotland (general)
    - Scottish Premier League 2006-07
  - Argentina
- Golf:
  - 2007 PGA Tour
  - 2007 European Tour
  - 2007 LPGA Tour
- Ice hockey 2006–07:
  - National Hockey League
    - Stanley Cup playoffs
- Lacrosse 2007:
  - National Lacrosse League
- Motorcycle racing 2007:
  - Motorcycle GP
- Rugby league 2007:
  - Super League XII
- Rugby union 2007:
  - 2007 Super 14 season
  - 2006–07 Heineken Cup
  - English Premiership
  - 2006–07 Top 14
  - 2006–07 Celtic League
  - 2007 Rugby World Cup qualifying
  - 2006–07 IRB Sevens
- Shooting 2007:
  - 2007 ISSF World Cup
- Speedway:
  - Speedway Grand Prix
- Volleyball 2007:
  - Men's CEV Champions League 2006-07
  - Women's CEV Champions League 2006-07

== 30 April 2007 (Monday) ==
- Basketball:
  - 2007 NBA Playoffs: First Round
    - Cleveland Cavaliers 97, Washington Wizards 90, Cavaliers win series 4–0
- Ice hockey:
  - Stanley Cup playoffs: Conference Semi Finals:
    - Ottawa Senators 2, New Jersey Devils 0, Senators lead series 2–1
    - San Jose Sharks 2, Detroit Red Wings 1, Sharks lead series 2–1

== 29 April 2007 (Sunday) ==
- American football
  - The New England Patriots trade their fourth round pick in the 2007 NFL draft to the Oakland Raiders for Randy Moss.
- Baseball
  - St. Louis Cardinals relief pitcher Josh Hancock dies in a traffic accident in St. Louis, Missouri. He was 29. The Cardinals' night game with the Chicago Cubs, which was to be televised nationally on ESPN, is postponed.
  - Troy Tulowitzki of the Colorado Rockies performs the 13th unassisted triple play in MLB history, catching a Chipper Jones line drive, tagging second base to force Kelly Johnson out off the bag, then tagging out Édgar Rentería in the 7th inning. Tulowitzki also had a two-RBI triple and scored a run in the 11-inning 9–7 Rockies victory over the Atlanta Braves.
- Basketball: 2007 NBA Playoffs First Round
  - Eastern Conference
    - The Chicago Bulls defeat the defending world champions Miami Heat 92–79 to sweep their first round series 4 games to none, assuring the NBA of a new owner of the championship trophy for the 2006–07 season.
- Football (soccer):
  - OFC Champions League 2007 Final, second leg.
    - (New Zealand) Waitakere United 1–0 4R Electrical Ba (Fiji) (aggregate: 2–2, wins on away goals)
    Waitakere United advances to FIFA Club World Cup 2007.
  - Dutch Eredivisie: The season entered its final day with three teams level on points.
    - Excelsior 3–2 AZ — The visitors, with a 6-goal edge in goal difference over their nearest competition, would have essentially secured the title with a win, but lost after being reduced to 10 men.
    - Willem II 0–2 Ajax — Ajax, in second entering the final day, take their goal difference to +49.
    - PSV 5–1 Vitesse — PSV's rout takes their goal difference to +50, pipping Ajax for the title.
  - Football League Championship:
    - Third-place Derby County lose 2–0 at Crystal Palace, thereby assuring first-place Birmingham City and second-place Sunderland of automatic promotion to the 2007–08 Premiership.
- Auto racing:
  - NASCAR NEXTEL Cup: Aaron's 499 at Talladega, Alabama
  (1) Jeff Gordon (2) Jimmie Johnson (3) Kurt Busch
  - IRL: Kansas Lottery Indy 300 in Kansas City, Kansas
  (1) Dan Wheldon (England) (2) Dario Franchitti (Scotland) (3) Hélio Castroneves (Brazil)
- Ice hockey
  - Stanley Cup playoffs: Conference Semi Finals:
    - New York Rangers 2, Buffalo Sabres 1, 2OT, Sabres lead series 2–1
    - Anaheim Ducks 3, Vancouver Canucks 2, Ducks lead series 2–1

== 28 April 2007 (Saturday) ==
- American football:
  - 2007 NFL draft:
    - The Oakland Raiders select Louisiana State University quarterback JaMarcus Russell with the first overall pick.
    - The big surprise of the first round comes when the Cleveland Browns, who had selected offensive tackle Joe Thomas with the third overall pick, make a trade with the Dallas Cowboys for the 22nd pick and choose Ohio-born quarterback Brady Quinn. The Notre Dame star had been widely expected to go much earlier in the draft. (AP via Yahoo)
- Cricket:
  - 2007 Cricket World Cup Finals
    - Australia 281/4 (38 ov.) vs.Sri Lanka 215/8 (36 ov.) by 53 runs (D/L)
- Football (soccer):
  - FA Premier League 2006–07:
    - Manchester United 4–2 Everton
    - Chelsea 2–2 Bolton Wanderers
    Kevin Davies' equalizer for Bolton denies Chelsea the full three points as the Red Devils erect a 5-point lead for the championship with their come-from-behind win away from home.
- Ice hockey:
  - Stanley Cup playoffs: Conference Semi Finals:
    - Detroit Red Wings 3, San Jose Sharks 2, Series tied 1–1
    - New Jersey Devils 3, Ottawa Senators 2, 2OT, Series tied 1–1
- Basketball: 2007 NBA Playoffs First Round
  - Eastern Conference
    - Detroit Pistons 97, Orlando Magic 93. Pistons win series, 4–0
    - Cleveland Cavaliers 98, Washington Wizards 92. Cavaliers lead series, 3–0
  - Western Conference
    - San Antonio Spurs 96, Denver Nuggets 91. Spurs lead series, 2–1
    - Utah Jazz 98, Houston Rockets 85. Series tied, 2–2

== 27 April 2007 (Friday) ==
- Football (soccer):
  - The FA Premier League fines West Ham a record £5.5 million (US $11 million) for irregularities in the registration of Carlos Tevez and Javier Mascherano earlier this season, but does not impose a points deduction. (BBC)
- Ice hockey
  - Stanley Cup playoffs: Conference Semi Finals:
    - Buffalo Sabres 3, New York Rangers 2 – Sabres lead series 2–0
    - Vancouver Canucks 2, Anaheim Ducks 1 2OT – Series tied 1–1

== 26 April 2007 (Thursday) ==
- Football (soccer):
  - 2006–07 UEFA Cup Semi Finals, first leg.
    - (Spain) Espanyol 3–0 Werder Bremen (Germany)
    - (Spain) Osasuna 1–0 Sevilla (Spain)
- Ice hockey:
  - Stanley Cup playoffs: Conference Semi Finals:
    - Ottawa Senators 5, New Jersey Devils 4 – Senators lead series 1–0
    - San Jose Sharks 2, Detroit Red Wings 0 – Sharks lead series 1–0

== 25 April 2007 (Wednesday) ==
- Baseball:
  - The Pittsburgh Pirates beat the Houston Astros 4–3 after 16 innings in the 3rd game that the teams have played at PNC Park in the last year which has gone 15 or more innings. (AP via Yahoo)
- Football (soccer):
  - 2006–07 UEFA Champions League Semi Finals, first leg.
    - (England) Chelsea 1 – 0 Liverpool (England)
  - CONCACAF Champions' Cup 2007 Final leg:
    - (Mexico) Pachuca 0–0 Guadalajara (Mexico)
    Pachuca win 2007 CONCACAF Champions' Cup 2–2 (aet) on aggregate, 7–6 on penalties, advance to 2007 FIFA Club World Cup.
- Cricket:
  - 2007 Cricket World Cup Semi-Finals
    - Australia 153/3 (31.3 ov.) beat South Africa 149 all out (43.5 ov.) by 7 wickets
      - Australia will be facing Sri Lanka in the final on Saturday aiming for their third successive title.
- Ice hockey:
  - Stanley Cup playoffs: Conference Semi Finals:
    - Buffalo Sabres 5, New York Rangers 2 – Sabres lead series 1–0
    - Anaheim Ducks 5, Vancouver Canucks 1 – Ducks lead series 1–0

== 24 April 2007 (Tuesday) ==
- Football (soccer):
  - 2006–07 UEFA Champions League Semi Finals, first leg.
    - (England) Manchester United 3–2 A.C. Milan (Italy)
    Cristiano Ronaldo gives United the lead in the 5th minute, before Kaká scores in the 22nd and 37th minutes to give Milan the half-time lead. Wayne Rooney scores in the 59th minute and 1st minute of added time to give United the lead before the second leg.
- Cricket:
  - 2007 Cricket World Cup Semi-Finals
    - Sri Lanka 289/5 (50 ov.) beat New Zealand 208 (41.4 ov.) by 81 runs

== 23 April 2007 (Monday) ==
- Baseball:
  - Alex Rodriguez hits his 13th and 14th home runs of the season in the New York Yankees' 10–8 loss to the Tampa Bay Devil Rays. The 14th homer ties the record Albert Pujols set last year for home runs in the month of April. A-Rod has six more games this month to try to reach the major-league record of home runs in any month, set by Sammy Sosa with 20 homers in May 1998. (AP via Yahoo)
- Figure Skating:
  - After 43 years on ABC Sports/ESPN on ABC, US Figure Skating will begin broadcasting their championship events on NBC starting with the 2007 Skate America event at Reading, Pennsylvania in October.
- Ice hockey:
  - Stanley Cup playoffs:
    - Vancouver Canucks 4, Dallas Stars 1. Canucks win series, 4–3

== 22 April 2007 (Sunday) ==
- Baseball:
  - Manny Ramírez, J. D. Drew, Mike Lowell and Jason Varitek of the Boston Red Sox hit four consecutive home runs against New York Yankees rookie Chase Wright in the third inning of the Sox' 7–6 win. The four players are the fifth quartet in Major League history to hit consecutive homers (AP via Yahoo).
- Athletics: 2007 London Marathon
  - Men's race:
  (1) (Kenya) Martin Lel, 2:07:41 (2) (Morocco) Abderrahim Goumri, 2:07:44 (3) (Kenya) Felix Limo, 2:07:47
  - Women's race:
  (1) (China) Zhou Chunxiu, 2:20:38 (2) (Ethiopia) Gete Wami, 2:21:45 (3) (Romania) Constantina Tomescu, 2:23:55
  - Men's wheelchair race:
  (1) (United Kingdom) David Weir, 1:30:51
  - Women's wheelchair race:
  (1) (United Kingdom) Shelly Woods, 1:50:41
- Auto racing:
  - Champ Car: Grand Prix of Houston in Houston, Texas, USA.
  (1) Sébastien Bourdais (France) (2) Graham Rahal (United States) (3) Robert Doornbos (Netherlands)
- Football (soccer):
  - FA Premier League 2006–07:
    - Chelsea 0–0 Newcastle United
    Chelsea restores Manchester United's 3-point lead.
    - Aston Villa 0–0 Portsmouth
    Portsmouth retains the UEFA Intertoto Cup berth over Tottenham Hotspur via goal difference.
  - Spanish La Liga 2006–07:
    - Barcelona 0–2 Villarreal
    - Athletic Bilbao 1–4 Sevilla
    Barcelona's loss and Sevilla's win closes the gap between Barca and Sevilla into a point.
    - Celta de Vigo 0–2 Real Zaragoza
    Zaragoza's win puts Celta level with Levante for the final relegation berth. Although Celta currently lead on goal difference, Celta and Levante have a match remaining at Celta—and in Spain, the first tiebreaker is head-to-head result, not goal difference (Celta and Levante drew previously).
  - Italian Serie A
    - Inter Milan 2–1 Siena
    - Atalanta 2–1 Roma
    With Roma losing coupled with an Inter win, Inter Milan wins their second successive scudetto.
  - Dutch Eredivisie
    - Ajax 5–2 Sparta
    - AZ 3–1 Heerenveen
    - FC Utrecht 1–1 PSV
    After previous leaders PSV fail to win, the Eredivisie enters its final weekend with Ajax, AZ and PSV level on points atop the league. AZ are first on goal difference (+53), with Ajax second (+47) and PSV third (+46).
- Ice hockey:
  - Stanley Cup playoffs:
    - Detroit Red Wings 2, Calgary Flames 1, 2 OT. Red Wings win series, 4–2
  - Flames goaltender Jamie McLennan was suspended for five games, coach Jim Playfair fined $25,000 (US) and the team fined $100,000 (US) after an incident where McLennan slashed the Red Wings' Johan Franzén late in Game Five of their series. With the Flames' elimination, McLennan's suspension will extend into the Flames' first four games of the 2007–08 season.
    - New Jersey Devils 3, Tampa Bay Lightning 2. Devils win series, 4–2

== 21 April 2007 (Saturday) ==
- Auto racing:
  - NASCAR: Subway Fresh Fit 500 in Avondale, Arizona, USA.
  (1) Jeff Gordon (2) Tony Stewart (3) Denny Hamlin
  Jeff Gordon's win ties him with Dale Earnhardt for seventh in all-time NASCAR Wins.
  - IRL: Indy Japan 300 in Motegi, Japan.
  (1) Tony Kanaan (Brazil) (2) Dan Wheldon (England) (3) Dario Franchitti (Scotland)
- Cricket:
  - 2007 Cricket World Cup Super Eights
    - England 301/9 (49.5 ov.) beat West Indies 300 (49.5 ov.) by 1 wicket
  - West Indies captain Brian Lara retires from all international cricket, effective after the match against England.
- Rugby:
  - 2006–07 Heineken Cup
    - (England) Leicester Tigers defeat (Wales) Llanelli Scarlets 33–17 in the first semi-final at Walkers Stadium.
- Football (soccer):
  - OFC Champions League 2007 Final, first leg.
    - (Fiji) 4R Electrical Ba 2–1 Waitakere United (New Zealand)

== 20 April 2007 (Friday) ==
- Cricket:
  - 2007 Cricket World Cup Super Eights
    - Australia 348/6 (50 ov.) beat New Zealand 133 (25.5 ov.) by 215 runs
- Ice hockey:
  - Stanley Cup playoffs:
    - Buffalo Sabres 5, New York Islanders 4. Sabres win series, 4–1
    The Presidents' Trophy winning Sabres eliminate the Islanders.
    - San José Sharks 3, Nashville Predators 2. Sharks win series, 4–1
    Patrick Marleau scores with 4:21 left in regulation as the Sharks knock the Predators out for the second time in as many years in five games.

== 19 April 2007 (Thursday) ==
- Ice hockey:
  - Stanley Cup playoffs
    - Ottawa Senators 3, Pittsburgh Penguins 0. Senators win series, 4–1
    The Sens advance past the Pens to the Eastern Conference semi-finals.
    - Anaheim Ducks 4, Minnesota Wild 1. Ducks win series, 4–1
    The Ducks eliminate the Wild in the Western Conference for the second time in three seasons.
- Cricket:
  - 2007 Cricket World Cup Super Eights
    - West Indies 230/5 (50 ov.) beat Bangladesh 131 (43.5 ov.) by 99 runs
  - West Indies captain Brian Lara announces his retirement from all international cricket, effective Saturday, after the match against England.

== 18 April 2007 (Wednesday) ==
- Baseball:
  - MLB: Mark Buehrle became the first Chicago White Sox pitcher in sixteen seasons to throw a no-hitter as the Pale Hose defeated the Texas Rangers, 6–0. Only a walk of Sammy Sosa in the fifth inning, who was immediately thrown out when caught off of first base, kept Buehrle from a perfect game, as he faced the minimum of 27 batters. He also got eight strikeouts.
- Ice hockey:
  - Stanley Cup playoffs:
    - New York Rangers 4, Atlanta Thrashers 2. Rangers win series, 4–0
    In a surprising upset, the Eastern Conference sixth seeded Rangers sweep the third seeded Southeast Division champions from Georgia.
- Basketball:
  - Joanne P. McCallie has been named the new head coach of the Duke University women's basketball team, replacing Gail Goestenkors.
  - On the final night of the NBA regular season, the Golden State Warriors advanced to their first playoff appearance in 12 seasons as they defeated the Portland Trail Blazers, 120–98, which led to the Los Angeles Clippers–New Orleans/Oklahoma City Hornets game become non-bearing as the Clippers were eliminated.
- Cricket:
  - 2007 Cricket World Cup Super Eights
    - Sri Lanka 81/2 (10.0 ov.) beat Ireland 77 all out (27.4 ov.) by 8 wickets
- Football (soccer):
  - FA Premier League 2006–07:
    - Chelsea 4–1 Watford
    Chelsea cuts Manchester United's lead back into three points for the race to the championship.
    - Liverpool 2–0 Middlesbrough
    The Merseysiders restored their two-point lead over Arsenal to remain ahead at third place.
  - Italian Serie A 2006–07:
    - AS Roma 3–1 Inter Milan
    AS Roma stalled Inter Milan's championship hopes on the San Siro, although Inter still leads by 13 points over second-place Roma.
    - Reggina 3–1 Messina
    Reggina stayed out of the relegation zone as fellow strugglers Messina sink further.
  - CONCACAF Champions' Cup 2007 Final, 1st leg:
    - (Mexico) Guadalajara 2–2 Pachuca (Mexico)

== 17 April 2007 (Tuesday) ==
- Cricket:
  - 2007 Cricket World Cup Super Eights
    - South Africa 157/1 (19.2 ov.) beat England 154 (48 ov.) by 9 wickets
- Football (soccer): FA Premier League 2006–07
  - Manchester United 2–0 Sheffield United
  The Red Devils erect a six-point lead ahead of Chelsea for the race for the title, but Sheffield United doesn't increase their lead against Charlton Athletic avoiding the relegation zone, which remained at 2 points.
  - Arsenal 3–1 Manchester City
  The Gunners pull ahead of Liverpool by a point for the third UEFA Champions League qualifying berth.
- Basketball:
  - NBA commissioner David Stern suspends referee Joey Crawford indefinitely after Crawford ejects San Antonio Spurs player Tim Duncan for laughing on the bench; Duncan himself was fined $25,000 for verbally abusing Crawford.

== 16 April 2007 (Monday) ==
- Athletics: 2007 Boston Marathon
  - Men's race:
  (1) (Kenya) Robert Kipkoech Cheruiyot, 2:14:13 (2) (Kenya) James Kwambai, 2:14:33 (3) (Kenya) Stephen Kiogora, 2:14:47
  - Women's race:
  (1) (Russia) Lidiya Grigoryeva, 2:29:18 (2) (Latvia) Jeļena Prokopčuka, 2:29:58 (3) (Mexico) Madai Pérez, 2:30:16
  - Men's wheelchair race:
  (1) (Japan) Masazumi Soejima, 1:29:16
  - Women's wheelchair race:
  (1) (Japan) Wakako Tsuchida, 1:53:30
- Cricket:
  - 2007 Cricket World Cup Super Eights
    - Australia 232/3 (42.4 ov.) beat Sri Lanka 226 (49.4 ov.) by 7 wickets

== 15 April 2007 (Sunday) ==
- Major League Baseball:
  - Jackie Robinson Day: To honor Jackie Robinson on the 60th anniversary of his first appearance with the Brooklyn Dodgers, many Major League players, and several entire teams, wear Robinson's number 42. No player had worn the number since it was retired league-wide in 1997. The number-42 jerseys worn today will be auctioned off to benefit the Jackie Robinson Foundation. (mlb.com)
- Auto racing:
  - Formula One: 2007 Bahrain Grand Prix
  (1) Felipe Massa (Brazil) (2) Lewis Hamilton (United Kingdom) (3) Kimi Räikkönen (Finland)
  - NASCAR: Samsung 500 in Fort Worth, Texas, USA.
  (1) Jeff Burton (2) Matt Kenseth (3) Mark Martin
  Jeff Burton uses a last-lap pass on Matt Kenseth to become the first two-time winner at Texas Motor Speedway.
  - Champ Car: Toyota Grand Prix of Long Beach in Long Beach, California, USA.
  (1) Sébastien Bourdais (France) (2) Oriol Servià (Spain) (3) Will Power (Australia)
- Football (soccer):
  - FA Cup Semi-final at Old Trafford:
    - Blackburn Rovers 1–2 Chelsea (aet)
- Cricket:
  - 2007 Cricket World Cup Super Eights
    - Ireland 243/7 (50 ov.) beat Bangladesh 169 (41.2 ov.) by 74 runs

== 14 April 2007 (Saturday) ==
- Football (soccer):
  - FA Cup Semi-final at Villa Park:
    - Watford 1–4 Manchester United
    Wayne Rooney scores twice to lead the Red Devils to Wembley on May 19.
- Boxing: "Blaze of Glory" pay-per-view at the Alamodome, San Antonio, Texas, United States:
  - (Philippines) Manny Pacquiao knocked out (Mexico) Jorge Solís at the eighth round to retain the WBC international super featherweight championship. Solis was knocked down thrice.
  - (Mexico) Cristian Mijares defeated (Mexico) Jorge Arce via unanimous decision to keep the WBC super flyweight championship.
  - (Mexico) Edgar Soza defeated (United States) Brian Viloria via majority decision to win the vacant WBC light flyweight championship.
  - (Mexico) Julio César Chávez, Jr. defeated (United States) Anthony Shuler when the referee stopped the fight. Chavez remained unbeaten.
- Cricket:
  - 2007 Cricket World Cup Super Eights
    - New Zealand 196/5 (48.2 ov.) beat South Africa 193/7 (50 ov.) by 5 wickets
- Olympic Games:
  - Chicago is selected by the United States Olympic Committee as the U.S. bid city for the 2016 Summer Olympics.
- Basketball: Southeast Asia Basketball Association Champions Cup Championship Game at Jakarta:
  - (Philippines) Harbour Centre 85–67 SM Britama (Indonesia) . Harbour Centre qualifies for the 2007 FIBA Asia Champions Cup

== 13 April 2007 (Friday) ==
- Cricket:
  - 2007 Cricket World Cup Super Eights
    - Australia 92/1 (12.2 ov.) beat Ireland 91 (30 ov.) by 9 wickets
    With two matches left for all teams, Australia are now sure of progressing to the knockout stage, while Ireland are sure of being eliminated after the Super Eights stage.

== 12 April 2007 (Thursday) ==
- Football (soccer):
  - 2006–07 UEFA Cup Quarter Finals, second leg (aggregate in parentheses).
    - (Portugal) Benfica 0–0 Espanyol (Spain) (2–3)
    - (Spain) Osasuna 1–0 Bayer Leverkusen (Germany) (4–0)
    - (England) Tottenham Hotspur 2–2 Sevilla (Spain) (3–4)
    - (Germany) Werder Bremen 4–1 AZ Alkmaar (Netherlands) (4–1)
- Basketball: Euroleague quarterfinals, Game 3 of 3
  - (Russia) CSKA Moscow 92–71 Maccabi Tel Aviv (Israel)
  - (Spain) Unicaja Málaga 67–64 Winterthur FCB (Spain)
  - These clubs join (Greece) Panathinaikos and (Spain) TAU Cerámica in the Final Four, to be held May 4 through May 6 at Panathinaikos' home court, the Olympic Indoor Hall in Athens.
- Cricket:
  - 2007 Cricket World Cup Super Eights
    - Sri Lanka 222/4 (45.1 ov.) beat New Zealand 219/7 (50 ov.) by 6 wickets

== 11 April 2007 (Wednesday) ==
- Ice hockey:
  - Stanley Cup playoffs:
  The Vancouver Canucks defeat the Dallas Stars, 5–4 in four overtimes in the first game of their best-of-seven Western Conference quarter-final series at Vancouver, British Columbia.
- Major League Baseball:
  - In his first appearance at Fenway Park, new Boston Red Sox pitcher Daisuke Matsuzaka gives up eight hits and three runs to the Seattle Mariners in seven innings and holds fellow countryman Ichiro Suzuki hitless. But Seattle starter Félix Hernández steals the show with a one-hit shutout, and the Mariners win, 3–0. (AP via Yahoo)
  - In the first game affected by Major League Baseball's new ban on tie games, the Milwaukee Brewers defeat the Florida Marlins, 3–2, in 13 innings. The game had been suspended due to rain Tuesday night in the 10th inning and resumed Wednesday. Under the old rules, Tuesday's game would have been declared a tie, wiped from the standings and replayed in its entirety. (AP via Yahoo).
- Cricket:
  - 2007 Cricket World Cup Super Eights
    - England 147/6 (44.5 ov.) beat Bangladesh 143 (37.2 ov.) by 4 wickets
- Football (soccer):
  - 2006–07 UEFA Champions League Quarter Finals, second leg (aggregate in parentheses).
    - (Germany) Bayern Munich 0–2 AC Milan (Italy) (2–4)
    - (England) Liverpool 1–0 PSV Eindhoven (Netherlands) (4–0)
- Free-diving
  - New Zealand freediver William Trubridge breaks his own world record in unassisted freediving in Dean's Blue Hole Bahamas. In a time of 3:09 he dove to 82 m (269 ft), breaking the old record of 81m set on 9 April. (Vertical Blue)

== 10 April 2007 (Tuesday) ==
- American football:
  - Adam "Pacman" Jones of the Tennessee Titans has been suspended for the 2007 NFL season for conduct off the playing field, while Cincinnati Bengals wide receiver Chris Henry has been suspended for the season's first eight games.
- Cricket:
  - 2007 Cricket World Cup Super Eights
    - South Africa 356/4 (50 ov.) beat West Indies 289/9 (50 ov.) by 67 runs
- Football (soccer):
  - 2006–07 UEFA Champions League Quarter Finals, second leg (aggregate in parentheses).
    - (England) Manchester United 7–1 Roma (Italy) (8–3)
    This marks the first time Manchester United have ever scored more than 5 goals in a European match, and the highest score in a quarter-final or later stage European Cup or Champions League match since the 1960 final.
    - (Spain) Valencia 1–2 Chelsea (England) (2–3)
    This is the first time Valencia have lost at home to an English team in 40 years.
- Ice hockey:
  - 2007 Women's World Ice Hockey Championships Championship
    - Team Canada defeats (United States) Team USA 5–1 reclaiming the championship after a 1–0 shootout loss at the 2005 Championship to Team USA. This marks Team Canada's 9th gold medal in 10 tournaments.
- Rugby league: Andrew Johns of the Newcastle Knights announces his retirement from the game. (Sydney Morning Herald)

== 9 April 2007 (Monday) ==
- Baseball
  - MLB: After all four of their scheduled home games with the Seattle Mariners were postponed due to snow in Cleveland, the Cleveland Indians announce that their upcoming three-game series against the Los Angeles Angels of Anaheim will be played at Miller Park in Milwaukee. (Yahoo! Sports)
- Cricket:
  - 2007 Cricket World Cup Super Eights
    - New Zealand 263/8 (50 ov.) beat Ireland 134 (37.4 ov.) by 129 runs
- Free-diving
  - New Zealand freediver William Trubridge breaks world record in unassisted freediving in Dean's Blue Hole Bahamas. In a time of 3:02 he dove to 81 m (265 ft), breaking the old record of 80m set exactly 2 years ago. (Dominion Post)

== 8 April 2007 (Sunday) ==
- Auto racing:
  - Formula One: 2007 Bahrain Grand Prix
  (1) Fernando Alonso (Spain) (2) Lewis Hamilton (United Kingdom) (3) Kimi Räikkönen (Finland)
- Cricket:
  - 2007 Cricket World Cup Super Eights
    - Australia 248/3 (47.2 ov.) beat England 247 (49.5 ov.) by 7 wickets
- Golf:
  - The Masters in Augusta, Georgia
  American Zach Johnson (+1) wins by 2 strokes over Rory Sabbatini, Retief Goosen and Tiger Woods. It is the first time in 50 years, and the third time ever, that a golfer has won The Masters with an over-par score.

== 7 April 2007 (Saturday) ==
- Ice hockey: 2007 Frozen Four in St. Louis, Missouri
  - Michigan State 3, Boston College 1 — The Spartans break a 1–1 tie with 18.9 seconds left, and seal the win and the national title with an empty-net goal.
- Baseball
  - MLB: Sammy Sosa, who is playing for the Texas Rangers after sitting out the 2006 season, hit his first home run since 2005 in an 8–4 victory over the Boston Red Sox. He now has 589 career home runs.
- The Oxford-Cambridge Boat Race:
  - Cambridge University win the 173rd Boat Race
- Cricket:
  - 2007 Cricket World Cup Super Eights
    - Bangladesh 251/8 (50 ov.) beat South Africa 184 (48.4 ov.) by 67 runs

== 6 April 2007 (Friday) ==
- Basketball
  - A day after rumored leading candidate Billy Donovan announced he was staying at Florida, the University of Kentucky name Texas A&M head coach Billy Gillispie as their new college basketball head coach. (ESPN)

== 5 April 2007 (Thursday) ==
- Football (soccer):
  - 2006–07 UEFA Cup quarter-finals, first leg:
    - (Netherlands) AZ Alkmaar 0 – 0 Werder Bremen (Germany)
    - (Germany) Bayer Leverkusen 0 – 3 Osasuna (Spain)
    - (Spain) Sevilla 2 – 1 Tottenham Hotspur (England)
    - (Spain) Espanyol 3 – 2 Benfica (Portugal)
- Rugby union:
  - The clubs in the Guinness Premiership, the top level of the sport in England, announce that they will join in the boycott of the 2007–08 Heineken Cup and European Challenge Cup previously announced by French clubs. This move places the future of both competitions in serious doubt. (BBC)

== 4 April 2007 (Wednesday) ==
- Basketball:
  - NBA:
    - Washington Wizards guard Gilbert Arenas will be lost for the rest of the season and playoffs (two to three months) with a sprained left knee suffered in a 108–100 loss to the Charlotte Bobcats.
  - Israel premier league:
    - In one of the longest matches in the history of professional basketball, Hapoel Jerusalem B.C. beat Ironi Ashkelon 151–146 after 6 overtime periods.
- Football (soccer):
  - 2006–07 UEFA Champions League quarter-finals, first leg:
    - Roma 2 – 1 Manchester United
    Violence erupts during match.
    - Chelsea 1 – 1 Valencia
- Cricket:
  - 2007 Cricket World Cup Super Eights
    - Sri Lanka 235 (50 ov.) beat England 233/8 (50 ov.) by 2 runs

== 3 April 2007 (Tuesday) ==
- Ice hockey:
  - The Carolina Hurricanes were mathematically eliminated from the Stanley Cup Playoffs, losing to the Tampa Bay Lightning 3–2. The Canes become the first team since the New Jersey Devils (in 1996) to fail to make the Stanley Cup playoffs in the season after winning the Cup. This also marks the first time in NHL history that both Stanley Cup finalists from the previous season, the Hurricanes and the Edmonton Oilers, were unable to make the playoffs the following year.
- College football:
  - Former Grambling coach Eddie Robinson, the first college football coach with 400 victories in his career, dies at the age of 88 due to complications from Alzheimer's disease in Grambling, Louisiana.
- Baseball:
  - 2007 MLB Opening Day:
    - San Diego Padres 7, San Francisco Giants 0
- Basketball:
  - 2007 Women's National Championship Game at Cleveland, Ohio:
    - (Dayton #1) Tennessee 59, (Greensboro #4) Rutgers 46
    The Lady Vols win their seventh NCAA championship with Candace Parker named the Most Outstanding Player of the tournament.
  - Gail Goestenkors leaves Duke to become the head women's basketball coach at Texas, replacing Jody Conradt.
- Cricket:
  - 2007 Cricket World Cup Super Eights
    - South Africa 165/3 (31.4/35 ov.) beat Ireland 152/8 (35/35 ov.) by 7 wickets (D/L)
- Football (soccer):
  - 2006–07 UEFA Champions League quarter-finals, first leg:
    - A.C. Milan 2 – 2 Bayern Munich
    - PSV Eindhoven 0 – 3 Liverpool

== 2 April 2007 (Monday) ==
- Baseball:
  - 2007 MLB Opening Day:
    - American League:
    New York Yankees 9, Tampa Bay Devil Rays 5
    Toronto Blue Jays 5, Detroit Tigers 3 (10 innings)
    Cleveland Indians 12, Chicago White Sox 5
    Kansas City Royals 7, Boston Red Sox 1
    Seattle Mariners 4, Oakland Athletics 0
    Minnesota Twins 7, Baltimore Orioles 2
    Los Angeles Angels 4, Texas Rangers 1
    - National League:
    Atlanta Braves 5, Philadelphia Phillies 3 (10 innings)
    Florida Marlins 9, Washington Nationals 2
    Milwaukee Brewers 7, Los Angeles Dodgers 1
    Cincinnati Reds 5, Chicago Cubs 1
    Arizona Diamondbacks 8, Colorado Rockies 6
    Pittsburgh Pirates 4, Houston Astros 2 (10 innings)
  - After accepting an $8.2 billion (US) offer by real estate magnate Sam Zell, The Tribune Company announces that the Chicago Cubs will be sold following the 2007 season.
- Basketball:
  - 2007 NCAA Men's Championship Game at Atlanta, Georgia:
  (Midwest #1) Florida 84, (South #1) Ohio State 75
  The basketball Gators repeat their football team's performance in the BCS Title Game thirteen weeks earlier, and in the process, became the first back-to-back national champions since Duke won in 1991 and 1992, and also the first Division I men's team in history to repeat as national champions with the same starting lineup. Corey Brewer is named the tournament's Most Outstanding Player for his performance. (ESPN)
- Cricket:
  - 2007 Cricket World Cup Super Eights
    - New Zealand 178/1 (29.2 ov.) beat Bangladesh 174 (48.3 ov.) by 9 wickets

== 1 April 2007 (Sunday) ==
- Golf
  - 2007 LPGA Tour
    - Morgan Pressel wins the 2007 Kraft Nabisco Championship for her first career victory and becomes the youngest woman to win an LPGA major event at 18 years, 313 days. The previous mark was held by Sandra Post who, at 20 years, 19 days, won the 1968 LPGA Championship. Suzann Pettersen dropped four strokes over three holes to finish one stroke behind Pressel.
- Auto racing:
  - IRL: Honda Grand Prix of St. Petersburg in St. Petersburg, Florida
  (1) Hélio Castroneves (2) Scott Dixon (3) Tony Kanaan
  - NASCAR Nextel Cup Goody's Cool Orange 500 at Martinsville, Virginia
  (1) Jimmie Johnson (2) Jeff Gordon (3) Denny Hamlin
- Baseball:
  - 2007 MLB Opening Night
    - New York Mets 6, St. Louis Cardinals 1
    In the 2007 season opener, the Mets turned four double plays behind Tom Glavine to defeat the team that denied them the National League pennant one year earlier.
- Basketball
  - NCAA Women's Final Four at Cleveland, Ohio:
    (#4 Greensboro) Rutgers 59, (#3 Fresno) Louisiana State 35
    (#1 Dayton) Tennessee 56, (#1 Dallas) North Carolina 50
    The Lady Vols outscored the Tar Heels 20–2 points in the final 8:08 of the game to advance to the title matchup.
- Cricket:
  - 2007 Cricket World Cup Super Eights
    - Sri Lanka 303/5 (50 ov.) beat West Indies 190 (44.3 ov.) by 113 runs
- Swimming:
  - Michael Phelps (United States) wins his seventh gold medal at the 2007 FINA World Aquatics Championships in Melbourne, Australia in the 400 meter individual medley race, in the process, setting his fifth world record. The seven gold medals ties Mark Spitz' total at the 1972 Summer Olympics in Münich, West Germany.
