= 2006–07 Euroleague Top 16 Group G =

Standings and results for Group G of the Top 16 phase of the 2006-07 Euroleague basketball tournament.

Key to colors
Top two places in each group advance to quarterfinals
Eliminated from contention

== Standings ==
	Team	Pld	W	L	PF	PA	Diff
1.	(Spain) Unicaja	6	4	2	448	442	+6
2.	(Russia) Dynamo Moscow	6	4	2	428	435	−7
3.	(Italy) Benetton Treviso	6	3	3	439	428	+11
4.	(Greece) Aris TT Bank	6	1	5	451	461	−10

== Fixtures and results ==
* = Overtime (one star per overtime period)

Game 1, February 14–15, 2007

Aris TT Bank (Greece)	74 – 86	(Russia) Dynamo Moscow	February 15, 2007
Unicaja (Spain)	75 – 61	(Italy) Benetton Treviso	February 15, 2007

Game 2, February 21–22, 2007

Benetton Treviso (Italy)	74 – 55	(Russia) Dynamo Moscow	February 21, 2007
Unicaja (Spain)	76 – 74	(Greece) Aris TT Bank	February 21, 2007

Game 3, February 28 - March 1, 2007

Dynamo Moscow (Russia)	86 – 80	(Spain) Unicaja	February 28, 2007
Aris TT Bank (Greece)	79 – 80	(Italy) Benetton Treviso	March 1, 2007

Game 4, March 7–8, 2007

Dynamo Moscow (Russia)	71 – 69	(Greece) Aris TT Bank	March 8, 2007
Benetton Treviso (Italy)	76 – 79	(Spain) Unicaja	March 8, 2007

Game 5, March 14–15, 2007

Benetton Treviso (Italy)	83 – 72	(Greece) Aris TT Bank	March 14, 2007
Unicaja (Spain)	73 – 62	(Russia) Dynamo Moscow	March 15, 2007

Game 6, March 21–22, 2007

Dynamo Moscow (Russia)	68* – 65	(Italy) Benetton Treviso	March 21, 2007
Aris TT Bank (Greece)	83 – 65	(Spain) Unicaja	March 21, 2007
