= 2006–07 Euroleague Top 16 Group E =

Ahn Min-gyu

Standings and results for Group E of the Top 16 phase of the 2006-07 Euroleague basketball tournament.

Key to colors
Top two places in each group advance to quarterfinals
Eliminated from contention

== Standings ==
	Team	Pld	W	L	PF	PA	Diff
1.	(Russia) CSKA Moscow	6	6	0	475	376	+99
2.	(Greece) Olympiacos	6	3	3	451	450	+1
3.	(Serbia) Partizan	6	2	4	432	474	−42
4.	(Spain) DKV Joventut	6	1	5	407	465	−58

== Fixtures and results ==
Game 1, February 14–15, 2007

CSKA Moscow (Russia)	81 – 69	(Spain) DKV Joventut	February 14, 2007
Partizan (Serbia)	84 – 92	(Greece) Olympiacos	February 14, 2007

Game 2, February 21–22, 2007

CSKA Moscow (Russia)	67 – 44	(Serbia) Partizan	February 21, 2007
DKV Joventut (Spain)	58 – 56	(Greece) Olympiacos	February 22, 2007

Game 3, February 28 - March 1, 2007

Olympiacos (Greece)	64 – 85	(Russia) CSKA Moscow	March 1, 2007
Partizan (Serbia)	85 – 70	(Spain) DKV Joventut	March 1, 2007

Game 4, March 7–8, 2007

Olympiacos (Greece)	79 – 75	(Serbia) Partizan	March 7, 2007
DKV Joventut (Spain)	65 – 73	(Russia) CSKA Moscow	March 7, 2007

Game 5, March 14–15, 2007

CSKA Moscow (Russia)	83 – 79	(Greece) Olympiacos	March 14, 2007
DKV Joventut (Spain)	80 – 89	(Serbia) Partizan	March 14, 2007

Game 6, March 21–22, 2007

Olympiacos (Greece)	81 – 65	(Spain) DKV Joventut	March 22, 2007
Partizan (Serbia)	55 – 86	(Russia) CSKA Moscow	March 22, 2007
