= 2006–07 Euroleague Top 16 Group D =

Standings and results for Group D of the Top 16 phase of the 2006-07 Euroleague basketball tournament.

Key to colors
| Top two places in each group advance to quarterfinals |
| Eliminated from contention |

== Standings ==
| | Team | Pld | W | L | PF | PA | Diff |
|---|---|---|---|---|---|---|---|
| 1. | (Spain) TAU Cerámica | 6 | 6 | 0 | 541 | 432 | +109 |
| 2. | (Israel) Maccabi Tel Aviv | 6 | 4 | 2 | 463 | 478 | −15 |
| 3. | (Italy) Lottomatica Roma | 6 | 1 | 5 | 416 | 468 | −52 |
| 4. | (France) Pau-Orthez | 6 | 1 | 5 | 469 | 511 | −42 |

== Fixtures and results ==
Game 1, February 14–15, 2007

| Lottomatica Roma (Italy) | 78 – 68 | (France) Pau-Orthez | February 14, 2007 |
| Maccabi Tel Aviv (Israel) | 68 – 79 | (Spain) TAU Cerámica | February 15, 2007 |

Game 2, February 21–22, 2007

| Pau-Orthez (France) | 89 – 99 | (Spain) TAU Cerámica | February 22, 2007 |
| Lottomatica Roma (Italy) | 69 – 71 | (Israel) Maccabi Tel Aviv | February 22, 2007 |

Game 3, February 28 - March 1, 2007

| TAU Cerámica (Spain) | 99 – 56 | (Italy) Lottomatica Roma | February 28, 2007 |
| Maccabi Tel Aviv (Israel) | 74 – 70 | (France) Pau-Orthez | March 1, 2007 |

Game 4, March 7–8, 2007

| Pau-Orthez (France) | 74 – 69 | (Italy) Lottomatica Roma | March 7, 2007 |
| TAU Cerámica (Spain) | 94 – 73 | (Israel) Maccabi Tel Aviv | March 7, 2007 |

Game 5, March 14–15, 2007

| Pau-Orthez (France) | 94 – 98 | (Israel) Maccabi Tel Aviv | March 15, 2007 |
| Lottomatica Roma (Italy) | 72 – 77 | (Spain) TAU Cerámica | March 15, 2007 |

Game 6, March 21–22, 2007

| TAU Cerámica (Spain) | 93 – 74 | (France) Pau-Orthez | March 22, 2007 |
| Maccabi Tel Aviv (Israel) | 79 – 72 | (Italy) Lottomatica Roma | March 22, 2007 |
