= Lazaros Papadopoulos =

Greek basketball player (born 1980)

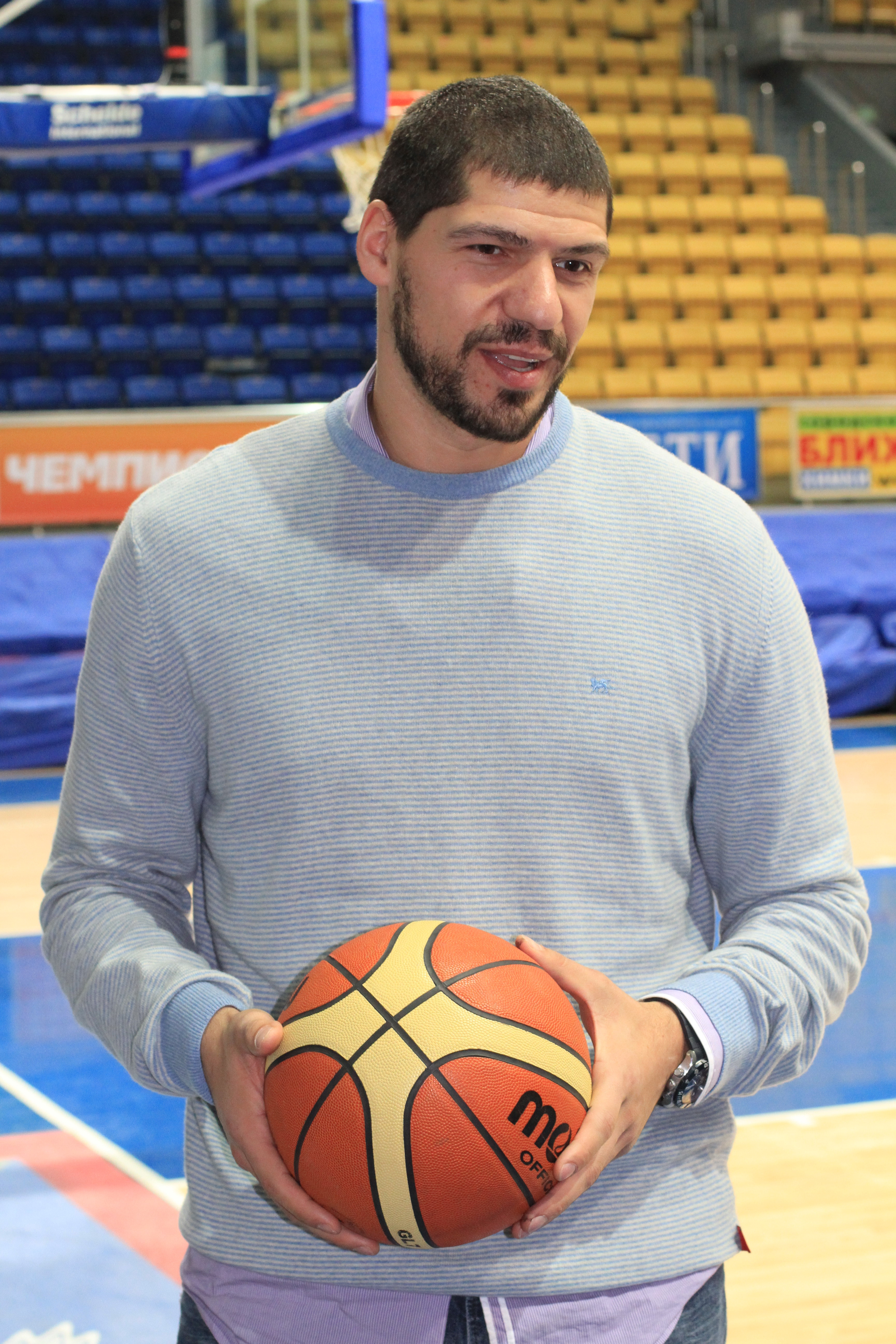
- Papadopoulos in 2011

Personal information
- Born: 3 June 1980 (age 46) Krasnodar, USSR
- Listed height: 7 ft 0 in (2.13 m)
- Listed weight: 265 lb (120 kg)

Career information
- NBA draft: 2002: undrafted
- Playing career: 1996–2014
- Position: Center
- Number: 6, 12, 14, 8

Career history
- 1996–2001: Iraklis
- 2001–2003: Panathinaikos
- 2003–2004: Iraklis
- 2004–2007: Dynamo Moscow
- 2007–2008: Real Madrid
- 2008–2009: Fortitudo Bologna
- 2009–2011: PAOK
- 2011: Khimki
- 2011–2012: Olympiacos
- 2012–2013: PAOK
- 2014: Canarias

Career highlights
- 2× EuroLeague champion (2002, 2012); All-EuroLeague Second Team (2007); FIBA EuroStar (2007); EuroCup Champion (2006); 2× Greek League champion (2003, 2012); Greek Cup Winner (2003); All-Greek League Team (2004); 6× Greek League All-Star (2001–2004, 2010, 2013); VTB United League champion (2011); Greek Under-18 Championship champion (1998)
Medals
Event	1st	2nd	3rd
FIBA World Cup	0	1	0
FIBA Stanković World Cup	1	0	0
FIBA EuroBasket	1	0	0
FIBA Under-18 EuroBasket	0	0	1
Total	2	1	1
Men's basketball
Representing Greece
FIBA World Cup
Silver medal – second place	2006 Japan	
FIBA Stanković World Cup
Gold medal – first place	2006 China	
FIBA EuroBasket
Gold medal – first place	2005 Serbia & Montenegro	
FIBA Under-18 EuroBasket
Bronze medal – third place	1998 Bulgaria	Under-18

Lazaros Papadopoulos (Greek: Λάζαρος Παπαδόπουλος; born 3 June 1980) is a Greek former professional basketball player. He was listed at 7 ft (2.13 m) 265 lbs (120 kg), and he played the center position. During his playing career, he was best known for his signature skyhook move.

Papadopoulos played with several teams in Europe throughout his professional club career, and he most notably won the EuroLeague twice, in 2002 with Panathinaikos Athens and in 2012 with Olympiacos Piraeus. He was an All-EuroLeague Second Team selection in 2007. He represented the senior Greece national team and won the gold medal at the 2005 FIBA EuroBasket and the silver medal at the 2006 FIBA World Championship.

== Early years and youth career ==
As a youth, Papadopoulos took up the sports of judo and basketball. He played basketball in the youth system of the Greek club Iraklis Thessaloniki. With Iraklis' junior club, along with his teammate Charis Markopoulos, Papadopoulos won the Greek Under-18 Championship in 1998.

== Professional career ==
Papadopoulos began his professional career playing with the Greek club Iraklis, in the 1996–97 season. After five years with Iraklis, he signed to play with the Greek League powerhouse Panathinaikos in 2001, and he stayed there until 2003. He then returned to Iraklis the following season, and stayed there for only one year, before next signing with the Russian club Dynamo Moscow, in the year 2004. In 2007, he joined the Spanish ACB League club Real Madrid. In 2008, he joined Fortitudo Bologna of the Italian League.

He won the EuroLeague championship during the EuroLeague 2001–02 season, while he was with Panathinaikos, and also the EuroCup championship, while he was with Dynamo Moscow, in the year 2006. In 2007, his performance with Dynamo Moscow during the EuroLeague 2006–07 season, earned him a selection to the All-EuroLeague Second Team. He joined the Greek club PAOK Thessaloniki for the 2009–10 season, and donated his salary to charity.

In February 2011, he joined the Russian club Khimky Moscow Region. In August 2011, he signed a one-year deal with Olympiacos. With Olympiacos, he won the EuroLeague championship in 2012. On 5 September 2012, he returned after few seasons to his former club PAOK. On 6 February 2014, Papadopoulos went back to Spain, after signing with 1939 Canarias. After only one game played, he parted ways with them.

== National team career ==
=== Greek junior national team ===
As a member in the junior Greece national team, Papadopoulos won the bronze medal at the 1998 FIBA Under-18 EuroBasket. He also competed with the Greek junior team at the 1999 FIBA Under-19 World Cup.

=== Greek senior national team ===
With the senior Greece national team, Papadopoulos won the gold medal at the 2005 FIBA EuroBasket. With Greece, he also won the silver medal at the 2006 FIBA World Championship. Papadopulos was also a member of the Greek teams that competed at the 2001 FIBA EuroBasket and the 2007 FIBA EuroBasket. He was also a part of Greece's 2004 Summer Olympic Games team. He played in a total of 103 games for Greece at the senior men's level, averaging 8.2 points per game. While playing with Greek the national team, Papadopoulos also won the Acropolis Tournament five times: in 2000, 2003, 2005, 2006, and 2007.

== Career statistics ==
Legend
GP	Games played	GS	Games started	MPG	Minutes per game
FG%	Field-goal percentage	3P%	3-point field-goal percentage	FT%	Free-throw percentage
RPG	Rebounds per game	APG	Assists per game	SPG	Steals per game
BPG	Blocks per game	PPG	Points per game	PIR	Performance index rating
**Bold**	Career high

=== EuroLeague ===
†	Denotes seasons in which Papadopoulos won the EuroLeague

Year	Team	GP	GS	MPG	FG%	3P%	FT%	RPG	APG	SPG	BPG	PPG	PIR
2001–02	Panathinaikos	**19**	6	15.4	**.638**	—	**.774**	4.1	.9	.4	.5	6.6	8.3
2002–03	Panathinaikos	**19**	5	11.8	.636	—	.677	2.7	.4	.4	.2	4.1	5.2
2006–07	Dynamo Moscow	17	**16**	**29.5**	.531	—	.667	**7.2**	1.8	**1.3**	**.9**	**14.8**	**20.3**
2007–08	Real Madrid	18	13	21.3	.484	—	.571	3.2	1.5	.8	.3	6.9	7.8
2008–09	Real Madrid	4	1	13.8	.412	.000	.500	2.3	—	.3	—	4.0	3.3
2011–12†	Olympiacos	13	8	13.8	.542	—	.176	2.8	**2.0**	.2	.4	4.2	5.0
Career		90	49	18.2	.547	.000	.621	3.9	1.2	.6	.4	7.2	9.1

== Personal life ==
Papadopoulos was born in Krasnodar, then-USSR, on 3 June 1980, as Lazar Popandopulo (Russian: Лазарь Попандопуло) to a Greek father and a Russian mother. In 1990, he came to Thessaloniki, Greece with his parents, Theodore and Marina, and younger sister Agapi.

He was married in August 2002, and he has two daughters, Danaie and Nefeli.
