= MBC Dynamo Moscow =

Former Russian basketball team

BC Dynamo Moscow
- Leagues: Moscow Basketball League
- Founded: 1923
- History: MBC Dynamo Moscow (1923–2016); BC Dynamo Moscow (2018–)
- Arena: RGU-MSHA Timiryazev
- Capacity: 500
- Location: Moscow, Russia
- Head coach: Aleksander Titeev
- Championships: 1 Eurocup; 2 USSR Championships
Home	Away

MBC Dynamo Moscow (Russian: МБК Динамо Москва) was a Russian basketball team from Moscow. It was active for 93 years (from 1923 until 2016) as professional club, before being dissolved due to financial problems. The club had several successful years in the highest division in Russian basketball. In 2006, Dynamo won a continental trophy in the Eurocup.

== History ==
=== Early years ===
Created in 1923 when Russia was part of the Soviet Union, Dynamo was among the oldest sports clubs in the country. Its name was chosen because Dynamo means 'power in motion'. The club was backed by the State Political Directorate (GPU), a police apparatus of the USSR. That is why the team has always been thought of as the police club, while cross-town rival CSKA Moscow was the army club. Dynamo earned a reputation outside the Soviet Union borders due to its success in sports such as football, handball, ice hockey and basketball. Dynamo Moscow won the USSR League championship in 1937 and 1948 and also made it to the final in 1944 and 1990.

=== 1960s and 1970s ===
Dynamo finished third in the Soviet Union League standings in 1946, 1957 and 1958, as well as making it to the 1952 USSR Cup final. Years of domestic obscurity followed in which the team could not achieve any remarkable domestic success. Aleksandr Boloshev was a member of the Olympic Team that won the gold medal in Munich 1972. Furthermore, Vladimir Zhigili was World Champion in Puerto Rico in 1974.

=== Modern era ===
The team found new success outside its domestic borders in the mid-1990s. Dynamo made it all the way to the Cup Winners' Cup semi-final in 1991, losing to eventual champ PAOK Thessaloniki. The team also qualified for the Korać Cup in 1992. 1994 and 1995 without much success. Things changed in 1996, however, as Dynamo shone in the 1996 Saporta Cup. Dynamo went all the way from the previous round, survived the group stage and made it to the best-of-three semi-finals playoffs. TAU Cerámica swept the series with an 87-98 road win in Moscow and a 104–93 home triumph in Vitoria, and it went on to win the title against PAOK Thessaloniki. The club could not live up to the expectations and one year after that, in 1997, Dynamo Moscow disappeared due to financial reasons despite having played the Euroleague for the first time in club history.

It was not until 2001 when Dynamo reappeared in the Russian basketball scene. MBC Dynamo Moscow was created under the support of the Dynamo society and its chairman Vladimir Pronichev. Dynamo entered the Russian League second division in the 2001–02 season and won the title that very same year, returning to the elite of Russian basketball. The club had to face new financial problems but once again the Dynamo organization stepped up to solve all troubles. MBC Dynamo Moscow joined the Dynamo organization in Moscow City and found a new president in his ex-coach Evgeny Gomelsky, brother of the coach and former CSKA president, the late Alexander Gomelsky. Dynamo finished sixth in the 2002-03 Russian League. Dynamo did even better in the 2003–04 season, in which players like Nikos Oikonomou, Jimmy Oliver, Nikolay Padius, Damir Mršić and the late Kenyon Jones helped the team to make it to the Russian League semi-finals.

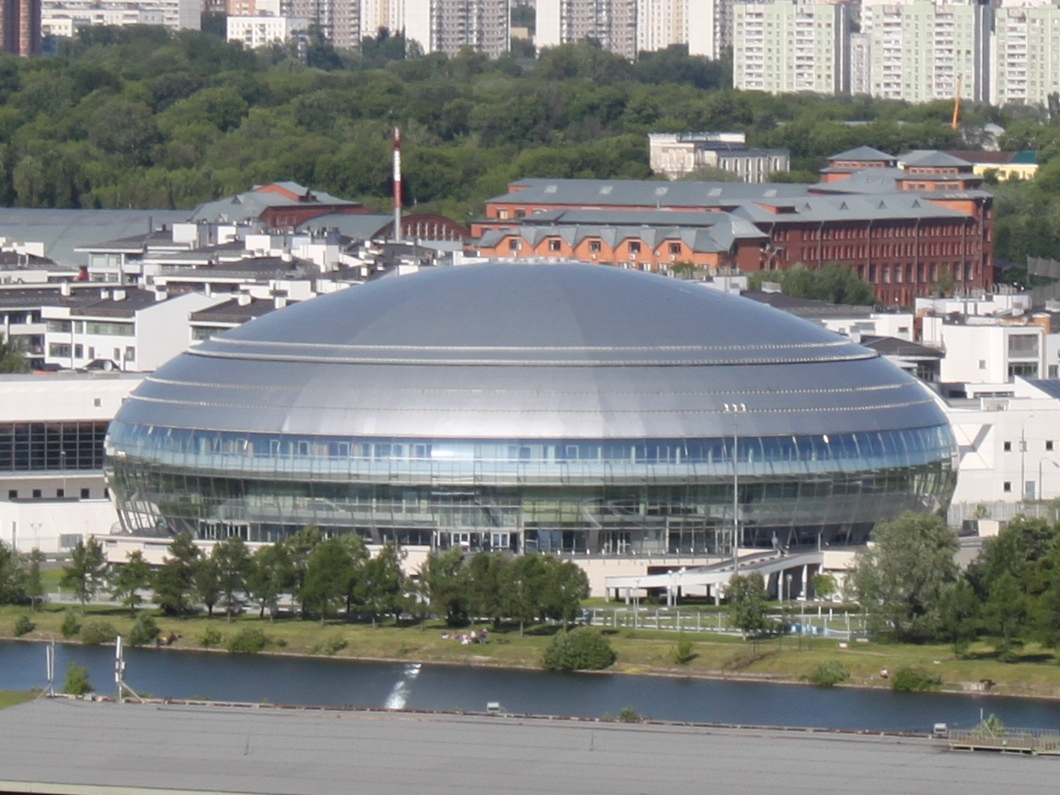
The Krylatskoe Sports Center, which Dynamo started playing in from 2006

Dynamo continues taking steps forward and making a big financial effort to incorporate some of the best European players in the market. As such, for 2004–05, Dynamo signed the Euroleague all-time top rebounder, Mirsad Türkcan, the 2003-04 Euroleague regular season top scorer Lynn Greer, center Lazaros Papadopoulos and veterans such as Ariel McDonald, Trajan Langdon, Kšyštof Lavrinovič and Andrei Fetisov. Dynamo won Group D in the ULEB Cup regular season and was considered a top candidate to go far in the elimination rounds, especially when the team won the first leg of the two-way eighth-finals series on the road against Hemofarm, 81–84, but lost 96–75 on their own home court. In 2006 the team won the ULEB Cup. In 2006 the club moved to its new arena in the Krylatskoe Sports Center. In the 2006–2007 season, Dynamo competed in the ULEB Euroleague, reaching the quarterfinals. They lost to Panathinaikos B.C. 0:2. A poor finish in domestic competition (4th place) lead the team returning to the ULEB Cup. Before the 2007–2008 season, coach Ivković was replaced by Svetislav Pešić. Heavy favorites to win, Dynamo struggled - they made the ULEB Cup Final Eight, but lost in the semifinals to CB Girona 78:81 in a huge shock, which lead to the firing of Pešić. He was replaced by Sergei Bazarevich. Dynamo finished in 3rd place in the PBL.

In the 2008–2009 season, David Blatt became head coach, and solid NBA players like Jannero Pargo and Boštjan Nachbar were signed, along with stars in Europe like Hollis Price and Darjuš Lavrinovič. Dynamo was a heavy favorite to win the EuroCup Basketball tournament, formerly the ULEB Cup. Despite playing solidly most of the way, Dynamo was plagued by financial problems - Price and Pargo left the team in January, with Brian Chase signing to replace Price. Still a favorite to win the EuroCup, Dynamo suffered a fiasco in the Final Eight tournament, losing to Hemofarm 85:93 in the quarterfinals. In the PBL, Dynamo finished in a disastrous 6th place. The next two seasons, 2009-2010 and 2010–2011, Dynamo didn't have any success in European competition, never reaching the playoffs in either the EuroCup and the FIBA EuroChallenge tournaments. In the PBL, Dynamo finished in 4th place in 2009–2010. In 2010–2011, in the PBL, Dynamo finished only in 9th place.

On June 18, 2011 the club was expelled from the PBL. From then the club was playing in the second division, the Super League 1. Dynamo also briefly played in the BBL, but left early due to financial difficulties. The team left the Super League in 2015 and was dissolved a year later.

=== Since 2018 ===
In April 2018 the club was reestablished as amateur club and is participating in the Moscow Basketball League.

== Honours ==
Total titles: 3

=== Domestic competitions ===
- USSR Championship
  - Winners (2): 1937, 1948

=== European competitions ===
- Eurocup
  - Winners (1): 2006

== Notable players ==
Note: Flags indicate national team eligibility at FIBA-sanctioned events. Players may hold other non-FIBA nationalities not displayed.

Criteria

To appear in this section a player must have either:

- Set a club record or won an individual award while at the club
- Played at least one official international match for their national team at any time
- Played at least one official NBA match at any time.

- (Soviet Union) - (Estonia) Tiit Sokk
- (Soviet Union) - (Russia) Sergei Bazarevich
- (Soviet Union) - (Russia) Aleksandr Boloshev
- (Soviet Union) - (Russia) Yuri Ozerov
- (Soviet Union) - (Russia) Viktor Vlasov
- (Russia) Nikolay Padius
- (Russia) Evgeniy Pashutin
- (Russia) Petr Samoylenko
- (Russia) Andrei Fetisov
- (Russia) Ivan Chiriaev
- (Russia) Ruslan Avleev
- (Russia) Nikita Morgunov
- (Russia) Dmitri Domani
- (Russia) Vitaly Nosov
- (Russia) Sergei Bykov
- (Russia) Sergei Monia
- (Russia) Yaroslav Korolev
- (Russia) Dmitri Khvostov
- (Panama) Ruben Douglas
- (Nigeria) Obinna Ekezie
- (Estonia) Martin Müürsepp
- (Slovenia) Boštjan Nachbar
- (Lithuania) Kšyštof Lavrinovič
- (Lithuania) Darjuš Lavrinovič
- (Lithuania) Robertas Javtokas
- (Finland) Hanno Möttölä
- (Georgia (country)) Giorgi Tsintsadze
- (Bosnia and Herzegovina) Damir Mršić
- (Turkey) Asım Pars
- (Turkey) Mirsad Türkcan
- (Greece) Nikos Oikonomou
- (Greece) Antonis Fotsis
- (Greece) Lazaros Papadopoulos
- (Croatia) Nikola Prkačin
- (Croatia) Marino Baždarić
- (Serbia) Miroslav Raičević
- (Serbia) Miloš Vujanić
- (Serbia) Bojan Popović
- (Serbia) Nenad Mišanović
- (United States) - (Russia) Travis Hansen
- (United States) - (Philippines) Jason Brickman
- (United States) Ariel McDonald
- (United States) Taquan Dean
- (United States) Henry Domercant
- (United States) Eddie Gill
- (United States) Lynn Greer
- (United States) Derrick Hamilton
- (United States) Trajan Langdon
- (United States) Pete Mickeal
- (United States) Jimmy Oliver
- (United States) Mire Chatman
- (United States) Brian Chase
- (United States) Hollis Price
- (United States) Roderick Blakney
- (United States) Jannero Pargo

== Head coaches ==
- (Soviet Union) - (Armenia) Stepan Spandaryan
- (Soviet Union) - (Russia) Evgeny Alekseev
- (Soviet Union) - (Russia) Evgeny Gomelsky
- (Russia) Sergei Bazarevich
- (Lithuania) Valdemaras Chomičius
- (Israel) Zvi Sherf
- (Russia) Valeri Tikhonenko
- (Serbia) Dušan Ivković
- (Serbia) Svetislav Pešić
- (United States) (Israel) David Blatt
