= 2006–07 Euroleague Top 16 Group F =

Standings and results for Group F of the Top 16 phase of the 2006-07 Euroleague basketball tournament.

Key to colors
Top two places in each group advance to quarterfinals
Eliminated from contention

== Standings ==
	Team	Pld	W	L	PF	PA	Diff
1.	(Greece) Panathinaikos	6	5	1	501	428	+73
2.	(Spain) Winterthur FCB	6	4	2	498	455	+43
3.	(Turkey) Efes Pilsen	6	2	4	416	458	−42
4.	(Poland) Prokom Trefl	6	1	5	404	478	−74

== Fixtures and results ==
* = Overtime (one star per overtime period)

Game 1, February 14–15, 2007

Panathinaikos (Greece)	84 – 57	(Turkey) Efes Pilsen	February 15, 2007
Winterthur FCB (Spain)	92 – 73	(Poland) Prokom Trefl	February 15, 2007

Game 2, February 21–22, 2007

Panathinaikos (Greece)	102 – 82	(Spain) Winterthur FCB	February 21, 2007
Efes Pilsen (Turkey)	67 – 71*	(Poland) Prokom Trefl	February 22, 2007

Game 3, February 28 - March 1, 2007

Prokom Trefl (Poland)	69 – 75	(Greece) Panathinaikos	February 28, 2007
Winterthur FCB (Spain)	82 – 73	(Turkey) Efes Pilsen	March 1, 2007

Game 4, March 7–8, 2007

Efes Pilsen (Turkey)	65 – 79	(Greece) Panathinaikos	March 8, 2007
Prokom Trefl (Poland)	59 – 77	(Spain) Winterthur FCB	March 8, 2007

Game 5, March 14–15, 2007

Efes Pilsen (Turkey)	82 – 78	(Spain) Winterthur FCB	March 14, 2007
Panathinaikos (Greece)	95 – 68	(Poland) Prokom Trefl	March 15, 2007

Game 6, March 21–22, 2007

Prokom Trefl (Poland)	64 – 72	(Turkey) Efes Pilsen	March 21, 2007
Winterthur FCB (Spain)	87 – 66	(Greece) Panathinaikos	March 21, 2007
