= Greek Basketball League Best Young Player =

The Greek Basket League Best Young Player or Greek League Best Young Player is an annual award for the best under-22 aged player of each season of Greece's top-tier level professional basketball club league, the Greek Basket League (GBL).

== Winners ==
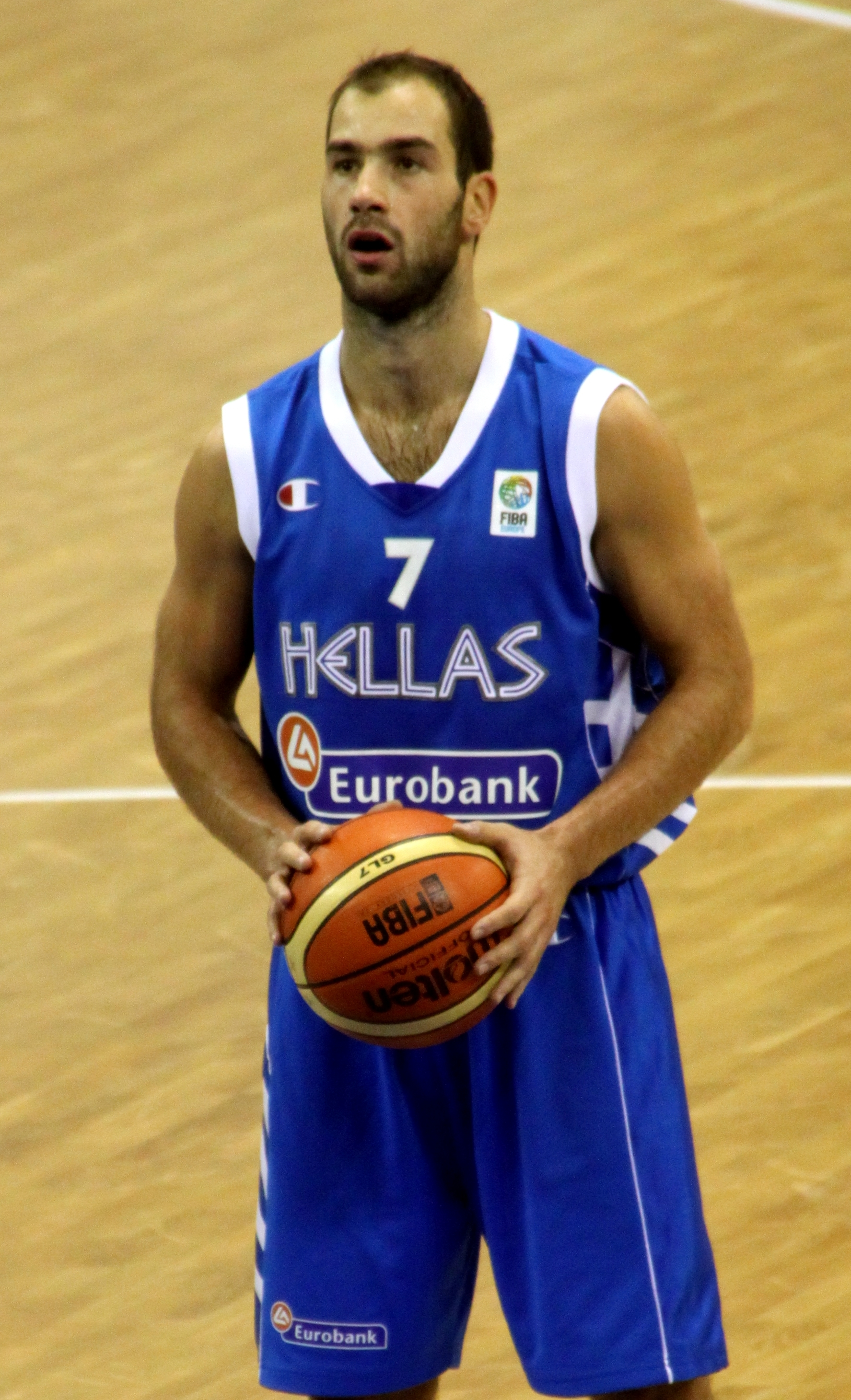
Vassilis Spanoulis was the Greek League Best Young Player in 2003.

| Season | Best Young Player | Club | Ref. |
|---|---|---|---|
| 1998–99 | (Greece) Kostas Tsartsaris | Near East | |
| 1999–00 | (Greece) Dimos Dikoudis | AEK | |
| 2000–01 | (Greece) Antonis Fotsis | Panathinaikos | |
| 2001–02 | (Greece) Nikos Zisis | AEK | |
| 2002–03 | (Greece) Vassilis Spanoulis | Maroussi | |
| 2003–04 | Not awarded | | |
| 2004–05 | Not awarded | | |
| 2005–06 | (Greece) Dimitrios Tsaldaris | Aris | |
| 2006–07 | (Greece) Giorgos Printezis | Olympia Larissa | |
| 2007–08 | (Greece) Ian Vougioukas | Rethymno | |
| 2008–09 | (Greece) Kostas Papanikolaou | Aris | |
| 2009–10 | (Greece) (Cyprus) Nikos Pappas | Kolossos Rodou | |
| 2010–11 | (Greece) Kostas Sloukas | Aris | |
| 2011–12 | (Greece) Kostas Papanikolaou (2×) | Olympiacos | |
| 2012–13 | (Bulgaria) (Greece) Sasha Vezenkov | Aris | |
| 2013–14 | (Bulgaria) (Greece) Sasha Vezenkov (2×) | Aris | |
| 2014–15 | (Bulgaria) (Greece) Sasha Vezenkov (3×) | Aris | |
| 2015–16 | (Greece) Ioannis Papapetrou | Olympiacos | |
| 2016–17 | (Greece) Antonis Koniaris | PAOK | |
| 2017–18 | (Greece) Antonis Koniaris (2×) | PAOK | |
| 2018–19 | (Greece) Zois Karampelas | Peristeri | |
| 2019–20 | Not awarded ^{1} | | |
| 2020–21 | (Greece) Nikos Chougkaz | Ionikos Nikaias | |
| 2021–22 | (Greece) Omiros Netzipoglou | Aris | |
| 2022–23 | (Greece) Lefteris Mantzoukas | Panathinaikos | |
| 2023–24 | (Greece) Neoklis Avdalas | Karditsa | |
| 2024–25 | (Greece) Neoklis Avdalas (2×) | Peristeri | |
| 2025–26 | (Greece) Nikos Plotas | Promitheas Patras | |

Notes:

^1 There was no awarding in the 2019–20, due to the coronavirus pandemic in Europe.
