= 2011–12 Greek Basket League =

2011–12 Greek Basket League season
- League: Greek Basket League
- Sport: Basketball
- Duration: 22 October 2011 – 2 June 2012
- Teams: 13
- TV partner(s): SKAI TV, ERT, Nova Sports

Regular Season
- Season champions: Olympiacos
- Season MVP: (Greece) Vassilis Spanoulis
- Top scorer: (United States) Dionte Christmas 437 Points (18.2 PPG)

Playoffs

Finals
- Champions: Olympiacos
- Runners-up: Panathinaikos
- Finals MVP: (Greece) Giorgos Printezis

Greek Basket League seasons
- ← 2010–11 2012–13 →

The 2011–12 Greek Basket League was the 72nd season of the Greek Basket League, the highest tier professional basketball league in Greece. The 156-game regular season (24 games for each of the 13 teams) began on Saturday, October 22, 2011, and ended on Wednesday, April 11, 2012. The playoffs ended on June 2, 2012. The championship was held without the presence of Panellinios that withdrew because of economic problems. So the championship was held with only 13 teams.

== Teams ==
Location of teams in Greek Basket League 2011–12

Club	Home city
Aris	Thessaloniki
Ikaros Kallitheas	Kallithea, Athens
Ilysiakos	Ilisia, Athens
KAOD	Drama, Greece
Kavala	Kavala
Kolossos Rodou	Rhodes
Maroussi	Maroussi, Athens
Olympiacos	Piraeus
Panathinaikos	Athens
Panionios	Nea Smyrni, Athens
PAOK	Thessaloniki
Peristeri	Peristeri, Athens
Rethymno	Rethymno

== Regular season ==
=== Standings ===
As of matchday 26th (final) on April 11, 2012

Pos	Team	Total							Home		Away	
		Pts	Pld	W	L	F	A	D	W	L	W	L
1.	Olympiacos	47	24	23	1	2025	1600	+425	12	0	11	1
2.	Panathinaikos	46	24	22	2	2114	1650	+464	12	0	10	2
3.	Kolossos Rodou	40	24	16	8	1787	1696	+91	10	2	6	6
4.	Rethymno Aegean	39	24	15	9	1881	1779	+82	9	3	6	6
5.	Panionios	38	24	14	10	1745	1630	+115	9	3	5	7
6.	Kavala	37	24	13	11	1708	1764	-56	10	2	3	9
7.	Aris	35	24	11	13	1770	1748	22	8	4	3	9
8.	PAOK	34	24	10	14	1658	1784	-126	9	3	1	11
9.	KAOD	33	24	9	15	1787	1900	-113	8	4	1	11
10.	Ikaros Kallitheas	32	24	8	16	1723	1892	-169	6	6	2	10
11.	Ilysiakos	31	24	7	17	1639	1802	-163	5	7	2	10
12.	Peristeri	31	24	7	17	1529	1742	-213	5	7	2	10
13.	Maroussi	25	24	1	23	1631	1990	-359	0	12	1	11

Pts=Points, Pld=Matches played, W=Matches won, L=Matches lost, F=Points for, A=Points against, D=Points difference

Qualified to League Playoffs
Relegated to HEBA A2 2012–13

== Playoffs ==
Teams in bold won the playoff series. Numbers to the left of each team indicate the team's original playoff seeding. Numbers to the right indicate the score of each playoff game.

=== Bracket ===
Quarterfinals
1	**Olympiacos**	**81**	**68**	-
8	PAOK	53	61	-
4	Rethymno Aegean	71	67	-
5	**Panionios**	**83**	**74**	-
2	**Panathinaikos**	**83**	**88**	-
7	Aris	68	65	-
3	**Kolossos Rodou**	**82**	**73**	-
6	Kavala	61	67	-

Semifinals
1	**Olympiacos**	**83**	**90**	**87**	-	-
5	Panionios	67	65	66	-	-
2	**Panathinaikos**	**103**	**102**	68	**74**	-
3	Kolossos Rodou	67	71	**73**	66	-

Finals
1	**Olympiacos**	**84**	79	**84**	74	**82**
2	Panathinaikos	78	**81**	72	**84**	76
3rd Place
3	Kolossos Rodou	**71**	64	**70**	71	63
5	**Panionios**	68	**81**	66	**88**	**73**

=== Quarterfinal 1 ===
Game 1

19 April 2012
19:00 EEST

Report

**Olympiacos**	**81**–53	PAOK
Scoring by quarter: **34**-6, **23**-15, 15-**16**, 9-**16**
Pts: Antić 18; Rebs: Antić 9 Asts: Sloukas 7		Pts: Dikoudis 10; Rebs: Aleksić 6 Asts: Pappas 4

Peace and Friendship Stadium, Piraeus
Referees: Kyriakos Tavoulareas, Athanasios Deslis, Kyriakos Pantelidis

Game 2

21 April 2012
18:00 EEST

Report

PAOK	61–**68**	**Olympiacos**
Scoring by quarter: 20-20, 11-**17**, 15-**18**, **15**-13
Pts: Pappas 15; Rebs: Aleksić, Pettway 8 Asts: Pappas 5		Pts: Spanoulis 15; Rebs: Dorsey 8 Asts: Spanoulis 4

PAOK Sports Arena, Thessaloniki
Referees: Nikos Somos, Dimitris Pafilis, Georgios Poursanidis

=== Quarterfinal 2 ===
Game 1

18 April 2012
16:00 EEST

Report

Rethymno Aegean	71–**83**	**Panionios**
Scoring by quarter: 16-**19**, 37-**43**, 50-**63**, 71-**83**
Pts: Christmas 17; Rebs: Petway 9 Asts: Tsochlas 4		Pts: Barlos 19; Rebs: Stepheson 11; Asts: Xanthopoulos 9

Rethymno Indoor Hall, Rethymno
Referees: Georgios Tanatzis, Charalambos Karakatsounis, Georgios Andrikopoulos

Game 2

20 April 2012
19:00 EEST

Report

**Panionios**	**74**–67	Rethymno Aegean
Scoring by quarter: 12-**24**, **14**-11, **28**-13, **20**-19
Pts: Xanthopoulos 21; Rebs: Stepheson, Xanthopoulos 7 Asts: Xanthopoulos 5		Pts: Christmas 30; Rebs: Latovic 6 Asts: Christmas 3

Nea Smyrni Indoor Hall, Athens
Attendance: in camera
Referees: Anastasios Poloïdis, Petros Papapetrou, Christos Panagiotou

=== Quarterfinal 3 ===
Game 1

19 April 2012
19:00 EEST

Report

**Panathinaikos**	**83**–68	Aris
Scoring by quarter: **20**-18, 18-**25**, **26**-5, 19-**20**
Pts: Logan 14; Rebs: Smith 7 Asts: Jasikevičius 5		Pts: Verginis 18; Rebs: Kerusch 7 Asts: Verginis 4

Olympic Indoor Hall, Athens
Referees: Christos Christodoulou, Stefanos Magglogiannis, Vasilis Mpikas

Game 2

21 April 2012
16:00 EEST

Report

Aris	65–**88**	**Panathinaikos**
Scoring by quarter: 18-**21**, 18-**25**, 17-**22**, 12-**20**
Pts: Bogris 16; Rebs: Bogris 8 Asts: Verginis 5		Pts: Logan 13; Rebs: Smith 8 Asts: Jasikevičius 9

Alexandreio Melathron, Thessaloniki
Referees: Ilias Koromilas, Konstantinos Xenikakis, Argyrios Kaldiris

=== Quarterfinal 4 ===
Game 1

18 April 2012
16:00 EEST

Report

**Kolossos Rodou**	**82**–61	Kavala
Scoring by quarter: **20**-15, 21-**23**, **17**-7, **24**-16
Pts: Hatten 23; Rebs: two players 6 Asts: five players 2		Pts: Angelopoulos 13; Rebs: Simtsak 6 Asts: Stefanidis 3

Venetoklio Indoor Hall, Rhodes
Referees: V. Afentoulidis, D. Mpitis, G. Georgiadis

Game 2

21 April 2012
16:00 EEST

Report

Kavala	67–**73**	**Kolossos Rodou**
Scoring by quarter: 18-**20**, 10-**21**, **21**-13, 18-**19**
Pts: Angelopoulos 23; Rebs: Simtsak 11; Asts: Pašalić 3		Pts: Tsamis, Hopson 14; Rebs: Tsamis 5 Asts: Hatten 7

Kalamitsa Sports Center, Kavala
Referees: Panagiotis Anastopoulos, Panagiotis Diamantis, Andreas Vardalos

=== Semi-finals 1 ===
Game 1

24 April 2012
19:00 EEST

Report

**Olympiacos**	**83**–67	Panionios
Scoring by quarter: 23-23, **19**-15, **25**-16, **16**-13
Pts: Dorsey, Spanoulis 13; Rebs: Dorsey 7 Asts: Sloukas 4		Pts: Diebler 17; Rebs: Diebler 6 Asts: Xanthopoulos 6

Peace and Friendship Stadium
Referees: Ioannis Foufis, Charalambos Karakatsounis, Christos Panagiotou

Game 2

26 April 2012
17:00 EEST

Report

**Olympiacos**	**90**–65	Panionios
Scoring by quarter: **27**-6, 22-**24**, **24**-18, 17-17
Pts: Spanoulis 21; Rebs: Dorsey 8 Asts: Spanoulis 7		Pts: Nađfeji, Keys 13; Rebs: four players 5 Asts: five players 2

Peace and Friendship Stadium
Referees: Georgios Tanatzis, Kyriakos Tavoulareas, Georgios Andrikopoulos

Game 3

28 April 2012
19:00 EEST

Report

Panionios	66–**87**	**Olympiacos**
Scoring by quarter: 18-**22**, 14-**23**, 21-21, 13-**21**
Pts: Keys 18; Rebs: Sarikopoulos 9 Asts: Xanthopoulos 5		Pts: Printezis 17; Rebs: Dorsey 6 Asts: Spanoulis 10

Nea Smyrni Indoor Hall, Athens
Attendance: in camera
Referees: Chrysostomos Schinas, Alexandros Psarianos, Konstantinos Mitsopoulos

=== Semi-finals 2 ===
Game 1

24 April 2012
17:00 EEST

Report

**Panathinaikos**	**103**–67	Kolossos Rodou
Scoring by quarter: **23**-20, **30**-12, **29**-18, **21**-17
Pts: Kaimakoglou, Vougioukas 13; Rebs: Vougioukas 5 Asts: Diamantidis 8		Pts: Hopson 19; Rebs: Boykin, Panos 5 Asts: Liakopoulos, Hatten 3

Olympic Indoor Hall
Referees: Spyridon Gontas, Nikos Somos, Konstantinos Mitsopoulos

Game 2

26 April 2012
19:00 EEST

Report

**Panathinaikos**	**102**–71	Kolossos Rodou
Scoring by quarter: **28**-20, **23**-13, **21**-13, **30**-25
Pts: Marić 16; Rebs: four players 6 Asts: Jasikevičius 7		Pts: Hatten 17; Rebs: Asimakopoulos 9 Asts: Kalaitzis 5

Olympic Indoor Hall
Referees: Ioannis Koromilas, Konstantinos Stamatopoulos, Kyriakos Poursanidis

Game 3

28 April 2012
17:00 EEST

Report

**Kolossos Rodou**	**73**–68	Panathinaikos
Scoring by quarter: 20-20, 13-**14**, 17-**18**, **23**-16
Pts: Liakopoulos 17; Rebs: four players 5 Asts: Liakopoulos, Kalaitzis 2		Pts: Vougioukas 14; Rebs: Smith 6 Asts: Diamantidis 3

Venetoklio Indoor Hall, Rhodes
Referees: Panagiotis Anastopoulos, Dimitris Bitis, Asterios Goumas

Game 4

30 April 2012
17:00 EEST

Report

Kolossos Rodou	66–**74**	**Panathinaikos**
Scoring by quarter: 14-**16**, 13-**17**, 18-**24**, **21**-17
Pts: Liakopoulos 20; Rebs: Asimakopoulos 8 Asts: Tsamis 3		Pts: Vougioukas 17; Rebs: Kaimakoglou 6 Asts: Jasikevičius, Logan 3

Venetoklio Indoor Hall, Rhodes
Referees: Christos Christodoulou, Vasilis Afentoulidis, Georgios Andrikopoulos

=== 3rd Place play-offs ===
Game 1

9 May 2012
17:00 EEST

Report

**Kolossos Rodou**	**71**–68	Panionios
Scoring by quarter: 14-**18**, 12-**19**, **23**-20, **22**-11
Pts: Hatten 15; Rebs: Tsamis, Asmimakopoulos 7 Asts: Hatten 5		Pts: Barlos 19; Rebs: Diebler 8 Asts: Xanthopoulos 7

Venetoklio Indoor Hall, Rhodes
Referees: Spyridon Gontas, Petros Papapetrou, Kyriakos Tavoulareas

Game 2

12 May 2012
17:30 EEST

Report

**Panionios**	**81**–64	Kolossos Rodou
Scoring by quarter: **28**-25, **18**-11, **24**-8, 11-**20**
Pts: Keys 16; Rebs: Athanasoulas 5 Asts: Xanthopoulos 5		Pts: Hopson, Liakopoulos 10; Rebs: Harissis 8 Asts: Liakopoulos 4

Nea Smyrni Indoor Hall, Athens
Referees: Georgios Tanatzis, Ilias Koromilas, Dimitris Bitis

Game 3

16 May 2012
16:00 EEST

Report

**Kolossos Rodou**	**70**–66	Panionios
Scoring by quarter: **20**-19, **17**-16, **16**-10, 17-**21**
Pts: Hatten 13; Rebs: Tsamis 6 Asts: Harissis 4		Pts: Keys 20; Rebs: Barlos 6 Asts: three players 3

Venetoklio Indoor Hall, Rhodes
Referees: Anastasios Piloïdis, Charalabos Karakatsounis, Alexandros Psarianos

Game 4

19 May 2012
16:00 EEST

Report

**Panionios**	**88**–71	Kolossos Rodou
Scoring by quarter: **19**-11, **25**-24, **24**-19, **20**-17
Pts: Nađfeji 15; Rebs: Barlos 8 Asts: Xanthopoulos 8		Pts: Liakopoulos 19; Rebs: Boykin 7 Asts: Harissis 3

Nea Smyrni Indoor Hall, Athens
Referees: Chrisostomos Schinas, Ioannis Foufis, Asterios Goumas

Game 5

22 May 2012
17:00 EEST

[Report]

Kolossos Rodou	63–**73**	**Panionios**
Scoring by quarter: 18-18, 18-**21**, 14-**16**, 13-**18**
Pts: Asimakopoulos 16; Rebs: Asimakopoulos 6 Asts: Liakopoulos 5		Pts: Diebler 20; Rebs: Kavvadas 7 Asts: Xanthopoulos 7

Venetoklio Indoor Hall, Rhodes
Referees: Georgios Tanatzis, Spyridon Gontas, Panagiotis Anastopoulos

== Finals ==
Game 1

21 May 2012
19:00 EEST

Report

Olympiacos
84–78
Panathinaikos
Scoring by quarter: 15-20, 26-13, 17-19, 26-26
Pts: Printezis 18,

Papanikolaou 16, Hines 13,
Rebs: Papanikolaou 8,

Antic 6
Asts: Spanoulis 5

Pts: Vougioukas 20
Rebs: four players 5
Asts: Diamantidis 6

Peace and Friendship Stadium, Piraeus
Referees: Panagiotis Anastopoulos, Ioannis Foufis, Vassilis Afedoulidis

Game 2

24 May 2012
19:00 EEST

Report

Panathinaikos
81–79
Olympiacos
Scoring by quarter: 20-19, 18-22, 29-18, 14-20
Pts: Diamantidis 23
Rebs: Kaimakoglou 10
Asts: Diamantidis 4

Pts: Hines 18,

Papanikolaou 11, Spanoulis, Printezis 10
Rebs: Papanikolaou 9
Asts: Spanoulis 5,

Mantzaris 4

Olympic Indoor Hall, Athens
Referees: Georgios Tanatzis, Spyridon Godas, Anastasios Piloïdis

Game 3

27 May 2012
19:00 EEST

Report

Olympiacos	84–72	Panathinaikos
Scoring by quarter: 29-18, 24-17, 16-16, 15-21
Pts: Printezis 16, Spanoulis 15, Rebs: Dorsey 9, Papanikolaou 5 Asts: Spanoulis 4		Pts: Batiste, Diamantidis 12; Rebs: Kaimakoglou 7 Asts: Calathes 6

Peace and Friendship Stadium, Piraeus
Referees: Christos Christodoulou, Charalambos Karakatsounis, Ilias Koromilas

Game 4

30 May 2012
19:00 EEST

Report

Panathinaikos
84–74
Olympiacos
Scoring by quarter: 14-19, 22-19, 19-20, 29-16
Pts: Diamantidis 15
Rebs: Batiste 11
Asts: Jasikevičius 7

Pts: Law 16,

Printezis 9, Papanikolaou, Spanoulis 8
Rebs: Dorsey 8,

Spanoulis 5
Asts: Spanoulis 8

Olympic Indoor Hall, Athens
Referees: Chrysostomos Shinas, Panagiotis Anastopoulos, Dimitris Mpitis

Game 5

2 June 2012
19:00 EEST

Report

Olympiacos	82–76	Panathinaikos
Scoring by quarter: 24-20, 24-16, 22-20, 12-20
Pts: Spanoulis 24, Printezis 14; Rebs: Printezis, Papanikolaou 7 Asts: Law, Spanoulis, Mantzaris 2		Pts: Calathes 17; Rebs: Perperoglou 8 Asts: Diamantidis 5

Peace and Friendship Stadium, Piraeus
Attendance: 16500
Referees: Chrysostomos Shinas, Spyridon Godas, Panagiotis Anastopoulos

== Final league standings ==
Position	Team	Overall Record		
		Games	Wins	Losses
1.	Olympiacos	34	31	3
2.	Panathinaikos	35	29	6
3.	Panionios	34	19	15
4.	Kolossos	35	21	14
5.	Rethymno Aegean	26	15	11
6.	Kavala	26	13	13
7.	Aris	26	11	15
8.	PAOK	26	10	16
9.	KAOD	24	9	15
10.	Ikaros Kallitheas	24	8	16
11.	Ilysiakos	24	7	17
12.	Peristeri	24	7	17
13.	Maroussi	24	1	23

2012–13 Euroleague Regular Season
Eurocup 2012–13 Regular Season
Relegation to HEBA A2 2012–13

- Kolossos and Rethymno forfeited their places in the Eurocup 2012–13 Regular Season.

Greek Basket League 2011–12
Champions
Olympiacos
10th Title

== Awards ==
=== Greek League MVP ===
- (Greece) Vassilis Spanoulis – Olympiacos

=== Greek League Finals MVP ===
- (Greece) Giorgos Printezis – Olympiacos

=== All-Greek League Team ===
- (Greece) Dimitris Diamantidis – Panathinaikos
- (Greece) Vassilis Spanoulis – Olympiacos
- (Greece) Kostas Papanikolaou – Olympiacos
- (Greece) Giorgos Printezis – Olympiacos
- (United States) Mike Batiste – Panathinaikos

=== Best Coach ===
- (Serbia) Dusan Ivkovic – Olympiacos

=== Defensive Player of Year ===
- (United States) Joey Dorsey – Olympiacos

=== Best Young Player ===
- (Greece) Kostas Papanikolaou – Olympiacos

=== Most Improved Player ===
- (Greece) Giorgos Printezis – Olympiacos

== Statistical leaders ==
Greek Basket League stats leaders are counted by totals, rather than averages, and include both regular season.

=== Points ===
Pos.	Player	Club	Total points
1.	(United States) Dionte Christmas	Rethymno	437
2.	(Greece) Dimos Dikoudis	PAOK	361
3.	(Greece) Kostas Charalampidis	K.A.O.D.	344
4.	(Greece) Christos Tapoutos	Aris	329
5.	(Greece) Nestoras Kommatos	Maroussi	326

=== Rebounds ===
Pos	Player	Club	Total Rebounds
1.	(Australia) Aron Baynes	Ikaros	199
2.	(Cameroon) Harding Nana	Ilysiakos	164
3.	(Greece) Vassilis Symtsak	Kavala	149
4.	(Greece) Christos Tapoutos	Aris	143
5.	(Croatia) Dragan Ćeranić	K.A.O.D.	137

=== Assists ===
Pos	Player	Club	Total Assists
1.	(Greece) Vassilis Spanoulis	Olympiacos	103
2.	(Greece) Dimitris Diamantidis	Panathinaikos	102
3.	(Greece) Vassilis Xanthopoulos	Panionios	98
4.	(Greece) Ioannis Gagaloudis	Maroussi	96
5.	(Greece) Kostas Charalampidis	K.A.O.D.	95

=== Steals ===
Pos.	Player	Club	Total Steals
1.	(United States) Zack Wright	Rethymno	54
2.	(Greece) Nick Calathes	Panathinaikos	42
3.	(United States) Daril Thompson	Ilysiakos	41
4.	(United States) David Logan	Panathinaikos	38
5.	(United States) Dionte Christmas	Rethymno	38

=== Blocks ===
Pos.	Player	Club	Total Blocks
1.	(United States) Sam Muldrow	Aris	33
2.	(United States) Brent Petway	Rethymno	31
3.	(United States) Patrick O'Bryant	Kavala	29
4.	(United States) Kyle Hines	Olympiacos	23
5.	(Greece) Ian Vougioukas	Panathinaikos	20

== Clubs in international competitions ==
Team	Competition	Result
Olympiacos	EuroLeague	Final-4, 1st place
Panathinaikos	EuroLeague	Final-4, 4th place
PAOK	EuroLeague	Qualifying rounds, Bracket A, First qualifying round
Aris	EuroCup	Last 16, 4th place
PAOK	EuroCup	Regular season, 4th place
