= Dionte Christmas =

American basketball player (born 1986)

Personal information
- Born: September 15, 1986 (age 39) Philadelphia, Pennsylvania, U.S.
- Listed height: 6 ft 5 in (1.96 m)
- Listed weight: 205 lb (93 kg)

Career information
- High school: Samuel Fels (Philadelphia, Pennsylvania); Lutheran Christian Academy (Philadelphia, Pennsylvania)
- College: Temple (2005–2009)
- NBA draft: 2009: undrafted
- Playing career: 2009–2018
- Position: Small forward

Career history
- 2010: Hapoel Afula
- 2010–2011: Mersin Büyükşehir Belediyesi
- 2011: ČEZ Nymburk
- 2011: PAOK
- 2011–2012: Rethymno Aegean
- 2012–2013: CSKA Moscow
- 2013: Montepaschi Siena
- 2013–2014: Phoenix Suns
- 2014–2015: Paris-Levallois
- 2015–2016: Hapoel Holon
- 2016: AEK Athens
- 2016: Torku Konyaspor
- 2016–2017: Delaware 87ers
- 2018: Ciclista Olímpico

Career highlights
- LBA champion (2013); Greek League Top Scorer (2012); All-Greek League Second Team (2012); 2× First-team All-Atlantic 10 (2008, 2009); Second-team All-Atlantic 10 (2007); Atlantic 10 Most Improved Player (2007); 2× Atlantic 10 tournament MVP (2008, 2009)
- Stats at NBA.com
- Stats at Basketball Reference

Dionte Lamont Christmas (born September 15, 1986) is an American former professional basketball player. He played college basketball for the Temple Owls.

== High school career ==
Christmas attended Samuel S. Fels High School in Philadelphia, Pennsylvania. As a junior in 2002–03, he averaged 17.7 points per game, earning honorable mention all-Public honors. As a senior in 2003–04, he averaged 26.5 points per game, earning first team all-Public League and third team all-City honors.

After completing his education at Samuel Fels, Christmas prepped for a year at Lutheran Christian Academy in 2004–05. He ranked among the Top 40 prep school players in the nation by Hoop Scoop's Clark Francis after averaging 18 points per game while leading his team to a 35–3 record. He was also an all-tournament selection at the 2005 National Prep Invitational held at the University of Rhode Island.

== Collegiate career ==
In his freshman season at Temple, Christmas played in all 32 games, making lone start in final game of season against Akron. He averaged 3.5 points per game, sixth best on squad and tops among reserves.

In his sophomore season, he played in all 30 games, starting 29, as he earned second team All-District and All-Atlantic 10 honors, and was named the Atlantic 10's Most Improved Player. He also earned first team All-Philadelphia Big 5, Big 5 Most Improved Player, and picked up Cy Kaselman and Palumbo awards as city-league's top free throw percentage leader and scoring champion, respectively. In 30 games, he averaged 20.0 points, 4.2 rebounds, 2.1 assists and 1.4 steals per game.

In his junior season, he started all 34 games averaging 37.2 minutes per game. He was named the Most Outstanding Player of the Atlantic 10 Tournament, and earned first team All-Atlantic 10 and first team Big 5 honors. He also earned USBWA first team All-District and NABC second team All-District honors. He became just the third person to win back to back A-10 scoring titles, averaging 19.7 points per game. He also averaged 5.9 rebounds, 2.5 assists and 1.4 steals per game.

In his senior season, he was named to the All-Atlantic 10 first team and the Atlantic 10 Tournament Most Outstanding Player for the second straight year. In 34 games, he averaged 19.5 points, 5.8 rebounds, 2.9 assists and 1.5 steals per game.

Christmas finished his Temple career with 2,043 points, becoming only the fourth player in school history to eclipse the 2000-point mark. During his senior season, he set school records for most three-pointers in a season (107) and career (317). He ranks in Temple's all-time top ten in three-pointers attempted and three-point field goal percentage. He is also the first player to lead the Atlantic 10 in scoring for three consecutive seasons.

=== College statistics ===
Season Averages
Season	Team	G	PTS	REB	AST	STL	BLK	FG%	3P%	FT%	MIN
2005–06	Temple	32	3.5	1.6	0.5	0.5	0.2	.281	.250	.587	11.3
2006–07	Temple	30	20.0	4.2	2.1	1.4	0.4	.466	.400	.871	34.3
2007–08	Temple	34	19.7	5.9	2.5	1.4	0.2	.439	.369	.772	37.2
2008–09	Temple	34	19.5	5.8	2.9	1.5	0.1	.414	.352	.753	35.0
Totals:		130	15.7	4.4	2.0	1.2	0.2	.425	.360	.777	29.6

== Professional career ==
=== 2009–10 season ===
After going undrafted in the 2009 NBA draft, Christmas joined the Philadelphia 76ers/New Jersey Nets combined team for the Orlando Summer League and the Los Angeles Clippers for the Las Vegas Summer League. On September 28, 2009, he signed with the 76ers. However, he was later waived by the 76ers on October 21, 2009.

On January 4, 2010, he signed with Hapoel Afula of Israel for the rest of the 2009–10 season.

=== 2010–11 season ===
In July 2010, Christmas joined the Sacramento Kings for the 2010 NBA Summer League. On August 4, 2010, he signed with Mersin of Turkey for the 2010–11 season. On January 28, 2011, he parted ways with Mersin.

On February 15, 2011, he signed with ČEZ Basketball Nymburk of the Czech Republic for the rest of the season. In April 2011, he left ČEZ Nymburk and joined P.A.O.K. B.C. of Greece for the rest of the season.

=== 2011–12 season ===
On October 18, 2011, Christmas signed with Rethymno Aegean B.C. of Greece for the 2011–12 season. In 26 games, he averaged 18.6 points, 4.4 rebounds, 3.0 assists and 1.6 steals per game.

=== 2012–13 season ===
In July 2012, Christmas joined the Boston Celtics for the 2012 NBA Summer League. On July 31, 2012, he signed with the Celtics. However, he was later waived by the Celtics on October 16, 2012.

On October 31, 2012, he signed with CSKA Moscow of Russia for the 2012–13 season. On February 21, 2013, he was waived by CSKA. On April 10, 2013, he signed with Montepaschi Siena of Italy for the rest of the season.

=== 2013–14 season ===
In July 2013, Christmas joined the Utah Jazz for the Orlando Summer League and the Phoenix Suns for the Las Vegas Summer League. On September 13, 2013, he signed with the Suns. On November 1, 2013, he made his NBA debut, recording 9 points and 4 rebounds in an 87–84 victory over the Utah Jazz.

=== 2014–15 season ===
In July 2014, Christmas re-joined the Phoenix Suns for the 2014 NBA Summer League. On July 24, 2014, he was waived by the Suns. On September 26, 2014, he signed with the New Orleans Pelicans. However, he was later waived by the Pelicans on October 17, 2014.

On November 12, 2014, Christmas signed with Paris-Levallois for the rest of the 2014–15 LNB Pro A season.

=== 2015–16 season ===
On October 10, 2015, Christmas signed with the Cleveland Cavaliers. However, he was waived on October 23 after appearing in four preseason games. On December 1, he signed with Hapoel Holon of the Israeli Basketball Premier League. On January 7, 2016, he was released by Holon in order for him to sign with AEK Athens of Greece for the rest of the season. On February 9, he parted ways with AEK after appearing in just four games. On March 27, he signed with Torku Konyaspor of Turkey for the rest of the 2015–16 BSL season.

=== 2016–17 season ===
On October 24, 2016, Christmas signed with the Philadelphia 76ers, but was waived the same day. Five days later, he was acquired by the Delaware 87ers of the NBA Development League as an affiliate of the 76ers. On February 7, 2017, Christmas suffered a right Achilles tendon rupture and was subsequently ruled out for the season. He was waived later that day. In 31 games with the Sevens, he averaged 14.9 points, 3.5 rebounds and 3.2 assists in 31.6 minutes.

=== 2017–18 season ===
On January 25, 2018, Christmas signed with Ciclista Olímpico of the Liga Nacional de Básquet.

== Career statistics ==
Legend
GP	Games played	GS	Games started	MPG	Minutes per game
FG%	Field-goal percentage	3P%	3-point field-goal percentage	FT%	Free-throw percentage
RPG	Rebounds per game	APG	Assists per game	SPG	Steals per game
BPG	Blocks per game	PPG	Points per game	PIR	Performance index rating
**Bold**	Career high

=== NBA ===
==== Regular season ====
Year	Team	GP	GS	MPG	FG%	3P%	FT%	RPG	APG	SPG	BPG	PPG
2013–14	Phoenix	31	0	6.4	.355	.290	.750	1.2	.3	.1	.1	2.3
**Career**		31	0	6.4	.355	.290	.750	1.2	.3	.1	.1	2.3

=== EuroLeague ===
Year	Team	GP	GS	MPG	FG%	3P%	FT%	RPG	APG	SPG	BPG	PPG	PIR
2012–13	CSKA Moscow	13	6	15.2	.483	.556	.727	1.1	.7	.4	.1	6.5	4.2
**Career**		13	6	15.2	.483	.556	.727	1.1	.7	.4	.1	6.5	4.2

== See also ==
- 2009 NCAA Men's Basketball All-Americans
