= Georgios Printezis =

Greek professional basketball player (born 1985)

Georgios Printezis Γεώργιος Πρίντεζης
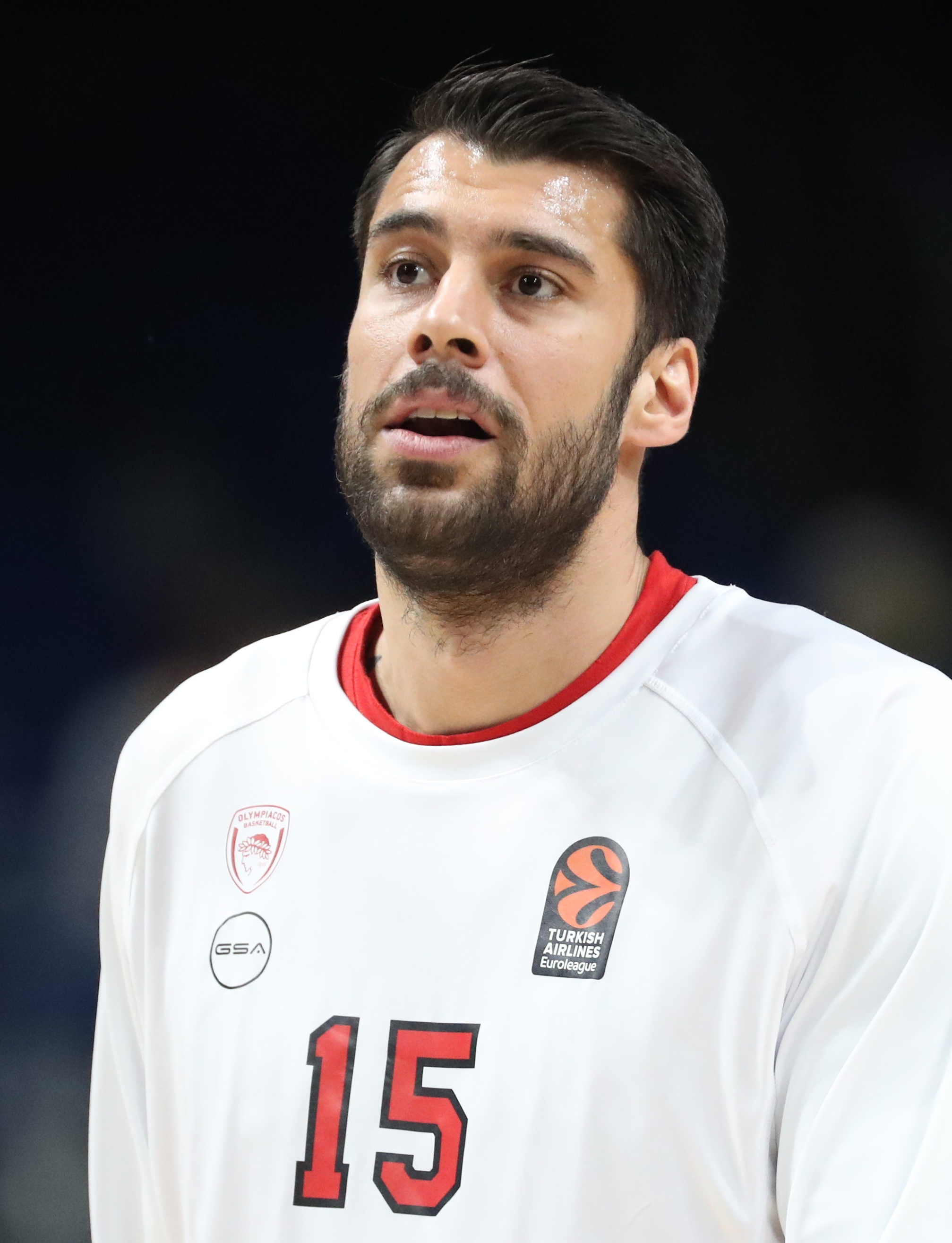
- Printezis with Olympiacos, in 2022

Personal information
- Born: 22 February 1985 (age 41) Syros, Greece
- Listed height: 2.05 m (6 ft 9 in)
- Listed weight: 105 kg (231 lb)

Career information
- NBA draft: 2007: 2nd round, 58th overall pick
- Drafted by: San Antonio Spurs
- Playing career: 2001–2022
- Position: Power forward
- Number: 16, 7, 8, 15

Career history
- 2001–2009: Olympiacos
- 2006–2007: →Olympia Larissa
- 2009–2011: Unicaja Malaga
- 2011–2022: Olympiacos

Career highlights
- 2× EuroLeague champion (2012, 2013); All-EuroLeague First Team (2017); EuroLeague 2010–2020 All-Decade Team (2020); EuroLeague 25th Anniversary Team (2025); FIBA Intercontinental Cup champion (2013); 4× Greek League champion (2012, 2015, 2016, 2022); 3× Greek Cup winner (2002, 2011, 2022); No. 15 retired by Olympiacos (2024); Greek League Hall of Fame (2022); 2× Greek League Finals MVP (2012, 2015); 5× All-Greek League Team (2012, 2014–2017); 6× Greek All-Star (2007, 2008, 2013, 2014, 2018, 2019); Greek League Most Improved Player (2012); Greek League Best Young Player (2007); Greek All-Star Game Slam Dunk champion (2007); Greek Youth All-Star Game MVP (2006); Acropolis Tournament Top Scorer (2013)
- Stats at Basketball Reference
Medals
Men's basketball
Representing Greece
FIBA EuroBasket
Bronze medal – third place	2009 Poland

Georgios Printezis (alternate spelling: Giorgos) Greek: Γεώργιος Πρίντεζης; born 22 February 1985, (a.k.a. the Saint), is a Greek former professional basketball player, who spent the majority of his pro club career with Olympiacos Piraeus of the Greek Basket League and the EuroLeague. Printezis won back-to-back EuroLeague titles with Olympiacos in 2012 and 2013. His game-winning shot against the Russian club CSKA Moscow, at the end of the 2012 EuroLeague Final, off an assist from Vassilis Spanoulis, is one of the all-time highlights in the history of the EuroLeague.

Printezis earned an All-EuroLeague First Team selection in 2017. While representing the senior Greek national team, Printezis was instrumental in Greece's bronze medal run at the 2009 EuroBasket.

== Professional career ==
=== Early years ===
For the 2006–07 season, Printezis was loaned by Olympiacos to Olympia Larissa, of the Greek League. With Olympia Larissa, he averaged 11.5 points and 3.9 rebounds per game. At the Greek All-Star Game weekend that season, he won the slam dunk competition. At the end of that season, he was also voted the Greek League Best Young Player. Following that success, he returned to Olympiacos.

=== Málaga ===
In 2009, Printezis signed a three-year contract with an NBA escape clause after the second year, worth €3.6 million net income, with the Spanish ACB League club Unicaja Málaga.

=== Return to Olympiacos ===
On April 27, 2011, Printezis returned to his previous club, Olympiacos Piraeus, after being transferred from Málaga. In the EuroLeague's 2011–12 season's Final, Printezis hit a game-winning shot, off an assist from Vassilis Spanoulis, with 0.7 seconds remaining on the game clock, to give Olympiacos the EuroLeague championship, with a victory over the Russian VTB United League club CSKA Moscow.

On 12 July 2012, Printezis signed a new three-year contract with Olympiacos. Prior to signing that contract, he had considered signing a three-year, US$4.5 million net income contract offer from the Turkish Super League club Fenerbahçe Ülker, but he chose to stay with Olympiacos instead. With Olympiacos, he also won the 2012–13 season championship of the EuroLeague. On 8 July 2014, he extended his contract with Olympiacos until 2017.

On 14 June 2017, Printezis signed a three-year contract extension with Olympiacos. He signed a one-year extension with the team on 16 June 2020. On 15 July 2021, Olympiacos announced that Printezis had agreed to another one-year contract extension with the club.

On June 17, 2022, Printezis officially announced his retirement from playing professional club basketball, after winning the Greek Basket League championship of the 2021–22 season with Olympiacos. During his final season with the Reds, he served as the team's captain.

=== NBA draft rights ===
Printezis was selected by the San Antonio Spurs, in the second round, with the 58th selection overall of the 2007 NBA draft. The draft rights to Printezis were then acquired by the Toronto Raptors, in exchange for their second-round draft pick in the 2008 NBA draft (the Spurs used that pick to draft Goran Dragić, and immediately traded Dragić to the Phoenix Suns, in order to acquire the draft pick they used in 2009 to draft future NBA All-Rookie Second Team member DeJuan Blair). On 20 January 2011, the Toronto Raptors traded Printezis' draft rights to the Dallas Mavericks, in exchange for Alexis Ajinça, a conditional 2013 second-round draft pick, and cash.

On 10 December 2011, the draft rights to Printezis were traded to the New York Knicks, along with Tyson Chandler, and the draft rights to Ahmad Nivins, in a three-way trade. The Mavericks received Andy Rautins from the Knicks, and a second-round pick from the Washington Wizards. The Wizards received Ronny Turiaf from the Knicks, in addition to a Dallas 2012 second-round draft pick, a 2013 Knicks second-round draft pick, and cash considerations.

In the summer of 2012, Printezis turned down a one-year contract offer from the Knicks, that reportedly was for slightly more than the minimum NBA salary. On 16 July 2012, his and Kostas Papanikolaou's draft rights were traded to the Portland Trail Blazers, in a deal that sent Raymond Felton to New York. On 21 February 2013, the draft rights to Printezis were subsequently traded to the Oklahoma City Thunder, in a deal that sent Eric Maynor to the Portland Trail Blazers. On 15 July 2014, Printezis' draft rights and Thabo Sefolosha, were traded to the Atlanta Hawks, in exchange for the draft rights to Sofoklis Schortsanitis, cash considerations, and a trade exception. On 9 July 2015, the draft rights to Printezis, alongside a 2017 second-round draft pick, were traded to the Spurs, in exchange for Tiago Splitter.

== National team career ==
=== Greek junior national team ===
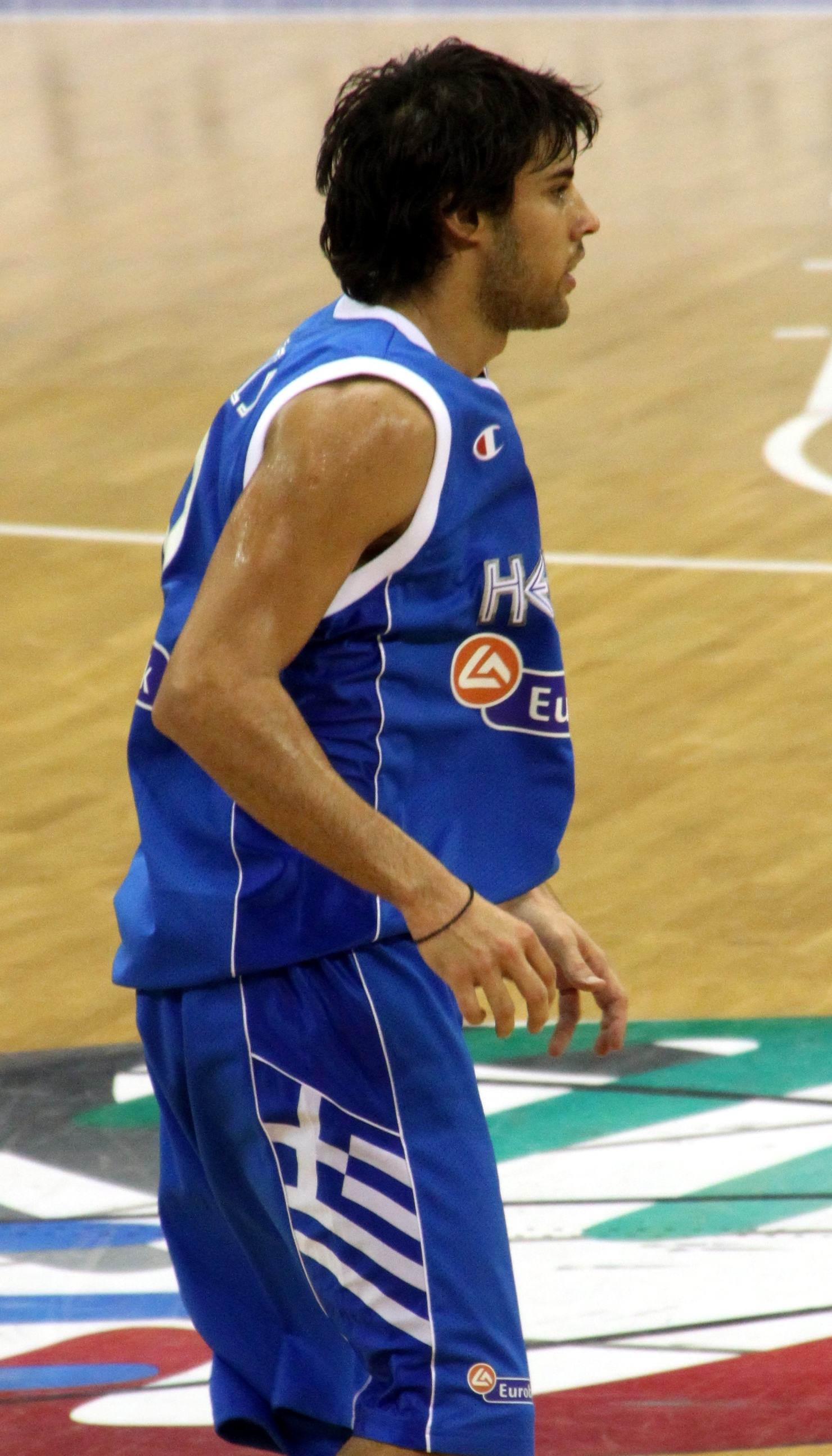
Printezis playing with the senior Greek national team, at the 2009 EuroBasket

With the junior national teams of Greece, Printezis played at the 2001 FIBA Europe Under-16 Championship, the 2004 FIBA Europe Under-20 Championship, and the 2005 FIBA Europe Under-20 Championship.

=== Greek senior national team ===
Printezis was selected to the senior Greek national team that played at the 2008 Summer Olympics. With Greece, he won the bronze medal at the 2009 EuroBasket.

In addition to that, Printezis was on Greece's national teams that played at the following major tournaments: the 2008 FIBA World Olympic Qualifying Tournament, the 2010 FIBA World Championship, the 2012 FIBA World Olympic Qualifying Tournament, the 2013 EuroBasket, the 2014 FIBA World Cup, the 2015 EuroBasket, the 2017 EuroBasket, and the 2019 FIBA World Cup.

== Club career statistics ==
Legend
GP	Games played	GS	Games started	MPG	Minutes per game
FG%	Field-goal percentage	3P%	3-point field-goal percentage	FT%	Free-throw percentage
RPG	Rebounds per game	APG	Assists per game	SPG	Steals per game
BPG	Blocks per game	PPG	Points per game	PIR	Performance index rating
**Bold**	Career high

=== EuroLeague ===
†	Denotes seasons in which Printezis won the EuroLeague

Year	Team	GP	GS	MPG	FG%	3P%	FT%	RPG	APG	SPG	BPG	PPG	PIR
2002–03	Olympiacos	3	0	2.0	—	—	—	.3	—	—	—	0.0	0.0
2003–04	Olympiacos	3	0	.9	**1.000**	—	—	.3	—	—	—	.7	.7
2004–05	Olympiacos	1	0	5.2	—	—	—	—	—	—	—	0.0	-1.0
2005–06	Olympiacos	8	0	8.9	.611	**.500**	.500	1.1	.1	.3	—	3.8	2.4
2007–08	Olympiacos	21	10	19.0	.513	.238	.609	3.2	.6	.3	.2	6.7	6.2
2008–09	Olympiacos	20	15	18.7	.636	**.500**	.517	3.3	.6	.4	.1	8.8	8.5
2009–10	Málaga	12	6	24.2	.517	.421	.750	4.3	.8	**.7**	.2	11.7	11.2
2010–11	Málaga	14	8	15.6	.386	.182	.688	2.7	.3	.2	.1	5.6	3.7
2011–12†	Olympiacos	21	4	21.8	.500	.310	**.864**	4.1	1.2	.3	**.3**	10.6	11.3
2012–13†	Olympiacos	29	27	20.9	.465	.312	.750	4.0	1.0	.2	.1	10.5	10.1
2013–14	Olympiacos	21	14	21.2	.443	.273	.659	4.7	1.0	.4	.2	10.2	10.3
2014–15	Olympiacos	20	13	25.1	.486	.300	.696	4.8	1.0	.4	.2	12.2	13.2
2015–16	Olympiacos	21	20	25.3	.561	.364	.698	**5.5**	1.3	.2	.1	**14.1**	**15.4**
2016–17	Olympiacos	32	**32**	25.4	.468	.403	.700	5.1	1.0	**.7**	.2	12.8	14.9
2017–18	Olympiacos	28	27	**25.6**	.466	.343	.691	**5.5**	**1.4**	.5	**.3**	12.0	13.7
2018–19	Olympiacos	30	26	25.6	.480	.308	.621	5.2	1.3	.4	.2	10.6	12.6
2019–20	Olympiacos	25	21	25.0	.526	.371	.690	4.3	1.2	.4	.2	11.8	13.8
2020–21	Olympiacos	31	14	18.2	.561	.436	.569	2.7	1.0	.3	.1	8.5	8.9
2021–22	Olympiacos	**35**	0	9.3	.485	.375	.846	1.2	.3	.1	.0	3.6	3.3
Career		375	237	20.3	.543	.340	.685	3.9	.9	.3	.2	9.6	10.2

=== Domestic leagues ===
†	Denotes season in which Printezis won the Greek Basket League championship

*	Led the Domestic league

Year	Team	League	GP	MPG	FG%	3P%	FT%	RPG	APG	SPG	BPG	PPG
2002-03	(Greece) Olympiacos	HEBA A1	11	6.5	.461	–	.562	1.8	.0	.0	.0	1.9
2003-04	(Greece) Olympiacos	HEBA A1	4	5.4	.666	–	.666	1.7	.0	.0	.0	3
2004-05	(Greece) Olympiacos	HEBA A1	1	8.4	.750	–	–	.0	.0	.0	.0	6
2005-06	(Greece) Olympiacos	HEBA A1	23	14.1	.636	.230	.692	3.1	.5	.4	.3	6.2
2006-07	(Greece) Olympia Larissas	HEBA A1	26	21.1	.577	.396	.711	4.0	.8	.4	.3	11.5
2007-08	(Greece) Olympiacos	HEBA A1	**36**	20.0	.478	269	.743	4.9	1.4	.7	.0	8.6
2008-09	(Greece) Olympiacos	HEBA A1	30	18.4	.463	363	.704	3.9	.8	.5	.0	9.6
2009-10	(Spain) Unicaja Malaga	ACB	33	21.4	.496	.267	.813	3.2	.9	.7	**.4**	9.8
2010-11	(Spain) Unicaja Malaga	ACB	19	13.5	.447	.233	**.826**	2.7	.7	.5	.1	6.2
2010-11	(Greece) Olympiacos	HEBA A1	8	10.0	**.692**	**.545**	.723	1.6	.0	.0	.0	5.5
2011-12†	(Greece) Olympiacos	HEBA A1	34	21.1	.607*	.380	.759	3.9	1.1	**.9**	.1	12.6
2012-13	(Greece) Olympiacos	GBL	32	**22.5**	.542	.314	.766	4.7	1.3	.6	.1	**12.8**
2013-14	(Greece) Olympiacos	GBL	31	20.2	.511	.292	.737	4.6	1.0	.5	.2	11.3
2014-15†	(Greece) Olympiacos	GBL	24	20.5	.509	.341	.670	3.3	1.0	.5	.2	11.0
2015-16†	(Greece) Olympiacos	GBL	25	20.6	.557	.317	.584	4.4	1.2	.3	.0	9.7
2016-17	(Greece) Olympiacos	GBL	31	21.0	.440	.327	.569	4.1	1.3	.6	.2	9.1
2017-18	(Greece) Olympiacos	GBL	25	20.0	.465	.295	.766	**5.4**	**1.6**	.4	**.4**	8.8
2018-19	(Greece) Olympiacos	GBL	20	20.0	.570	.193	.553	4.7	1.2	.1	.1	10.4
2021-22†	(Greece) Olympiacos	GBL	29	11.5	.671	.324	.730	2.3	0.9	.2	.0	5.3

== Greece national team career statistics ==
=== National team ===
Year	National Team	Tournament	GP	PPG	RPG	APG
2008	Greece Men	Olympic Qualifying Tournament	4	4.5	1.8	.8
2008	Greece Men	Summer Olympics	4	5.0	0.8	.3
2009	Greece Men	EuroBasket	9	5.4	2.4	.9
2010	Greece Men	World Cup	5	3.8	1.6	.4
2012	Greece Men	World Cup qualification	3	14.0	4.7	2.0
2013	Greece Men	EuroBasket	8	4.4	2.6	.6
2014	Greece Men	World Cup	6	11.7	3.7	1.2
2015	Greece Men	EuroBasket	8	10.6	2.6	1.9
2017	Greece Men	EuroBasket	7	13.9	4.6	1.7
2019	Greece Men	World Cup qualification	1	15.0	4.0	1.0
2019	Greece Men	World Cup	5	12.2	2.2	2.0
2023	Greece Men	World Cup qualification	1	7.0	5.0	—

.

== Awards and accomplishments ==
=== Titles won ===
- 2× EuroLeague Champion: 2012, 2013 (with Olympiacos Piraeus)
- FIBA Intercontinental Cup Champion: 2013 (with Olympiacos Piraeus)
- 4× Greek League Champion: 2012, 2015, 2016, 2022 (with Olympiacos Piraeus)
- 3× Greek Cup Winner: 2002, 2011, 2022 (with Olympiacos Piraeus)

=== Other honors ===
- 2× EuroLeague Finals Finalist: 2015, 2017 (with Olympiacos Piraeus)
- 6× EuroLeague Final Four Participation: 2009, 2012, 2013, 2015, 2017, 2022 (with Olympiacos Piraeus)
- 7× Greek League Finalist: 2008, 2009, 2011, 2013, 2014, 2017, 2018 (with Olympiacos Piraeus)
- 5× Greek Cup Finalist: 2008, 2009, 2012, 2013, 2018 (with Olympiacos Piraeus)

=== Greek senior national team ===
- 2009 EuroBasket: Bronze
- 3× Acropolis Tournament Champion: 2013, 2015, 2017

=== Individual awards and accomplishments ===
==== European awards ====
- EuroLeague 25th Anniversary Team: 2025
- EuroLeague 2010–2020 All-Decade Team: 2020
- All-EuroLeague First Team: 2017
- EuroLeague MVP of the Month: April 2015
- 3× EuroLeague MVP of the Round:
- Eurobasket.com's All-Europe First Team: 2017

==== Domestic awards ====
- Greek League Hall of Fame: 2022
- 2× Greek League Finals MVP: 2012, 2015
- 5× All-Greek League Team: 2012, 2014, 2015, 2016, 2017
- Greek All-Star Game Slam Dunk Champion: 2007
- 6× Greek League All-Star: 2007, 2008, 2013, 2014, 2018, 2019
- Greek Youth All-Star Game MVP: 2006
- Greek League Best Young Player: 2007
- Greek League Most Improved Player: 2012
- Greek Cup Finals Top Scorer: 2012

==== Club team awards ====
- No. 15 retired by Olympiacos Piraeus (2024)
- Olympiacos Piraeus 2010–20 Team of Decade
- Olympiacos Piraeus' All-Time Greek League Top Scorer

==== National team awards ====
- Acropolis Tournament Top Scorer: 2013
