= 2011–12 Aris B.C. season =

Aris B.C.
2011–12 season
- Head coach: Vangelis Alexandris
- Greek Basket League: Regular Season
- Greek Cup: Last 8
- EuroCup: Last 16

Aris B.C. competed in Greek Basket League. They started their Greek League season campaign, after finishing in fourth place in the previous season's playoffs.

== Competitions ==
=== League ===
==== Matches ====
Panathinaikos	vs.	Aris

Olympic Indoor Hall, Athens
