= Kostas Papanikolaou =

Greek basketball player (born 1990)

Kostas Papanikolaou Κώστας Παπανικολάου
- Papanikolaou with Olympiacos in 2026

No. 16 – Olympiacos
- Position: Small forward
- League: GBL; EuroLeague

Personal information
- Born: 31 July 1990 (age 36) Trikala, Greece
- Listed height: 2.04 m (6 ft 8 in)
- Listed weight: 107 kg (236 lb)

Career information
- NBA draft: 2012: 2nd round, 48th overall pick
- Drafted by: New York Knicks
- Playing career: 2008–present

Career history
- 2008–2009: Aris Thessaloniki
- 2009–2013: Olympiacos
- 2013–2014: FC Barcelona
- 2014–2015: Houston Rockets
- 2015–2016: Denver Nuggets
- 2016–present: Olympiacos

Career highlights
- 3× EuroLeague champion (2012, 2013, 2026); EuroLeague Rising Star (2013); Liga ACB champion (2014); 6× Greek League champion (2012, 2016, 2022, 2023, 2025, 2026); 5× Greek Cup winner (2010, 2011, 2022–2024); 5× Greek Super Cup winner (2022–2026); 5× All-Greek League Team (2012, 2013, 2017, 2023, 2024); 5× Greek All-Star (2013, 2018, 2019, 2022, 2023); 2× Greek League Best Young Player (2009, 2012); FIBA U20 EuroBasket MVP (2009)
- Stats at NBA.com
- Stats at Basketball Reference
Medals
Men's basketball
Representing Greece
EuroBasket
Bronze medal – third place	2025 Cyprus–Finland–Poland–Latvia
FIBA U19 World Cup
Silver medal – second place	2009 New Zealand	Under-19
FIBA U20 EuroBasket
Gold medal – first place	2009 Greece	Under-20
Silver medal – second place	2010 Croatia	Under-20
FIBA U18 EuroBasket
Gold medal – first place	2008 Greece	Under-18
Silver medal – second place	2007 Spain	Under-18

Konstantinos "Kostas" Papanikolaou (Greek: Κωνσταντίνος "Κώστας" Παπανικολάου; born 31 July 1990), nicknamed "Air Pap", is a Greek professional basketball player and the team captain for Olympiacos of the Greek Basket League (GBL) and the EuroLeague. Standing at 2.04 m (6'8 1/2"), he plays at the small forward position. He is widely considered among the best defensive players in European basketball.

A back-to-back EuroLeague champion with Olympiacos in 2012 and 2013, Papanikolaou was the EuroLeague Finals Top Scorer in 2012 and won the EuroLeague Rising Star award in 2013. He has reached another two finals with the Reds in 2017 and 2023. He is also the first player in EuroLeague history to record 2.000 points, 1.000 rebounds, 400 assists, 300 three-pointers made, 200 steals and 100 blocks.

Since very early in his career, Papanikolaou has been a regular member of the Hellenic national team. After winning five medals at the youth level, he helped Greece capture the bronze medal at EuroBasket 2025.

== Professional career ==
=== Aris (2008–2009) ===
Papanikolaou began playing basketball with the youth teams of Proteas Grevenon and Aris, and he made his pro debut in the Greek League, with Aris, during the 2008–09 season. He was named the MVP of the Greek Youth All-Star Game in 2009. He was also named the Greek League's Best Young Player in 2009.

=== Olympiacos (2009–2013) ===
On 14 September 2009, Papanikolaou signed a five-year, €1.3 million net income deal with Olympiacos, after Olympiacos paid a €950,000 buyout fee to Aris, to secure his player rights. Papanikolaou's contract with Olympiacos had an NBA buyout clause worth €1 million.

With Olympiacos, he won the EuroLeague and Greek League championships in 2012. Papanikolaou was voted the EuroLeague Rising Star for the EuroLeague 2012–13 season. With Olympiacos, he also won the 2012–13 season EuroLeague championship.

=== FC Barcelona (2013–2014) ===
On 20 July 2013, Papanikolaou signed a four-year deal with Spanish League club FC Barcelona, after Barcelona bought Papanikolaou out of his contract with Olympiacos, paying a transfer buyout fee of €1.5 million to Olympiacos, and giving Papanikolaou a contract worth €5.5 million net income, during the contract's first three years (the 4th optional year would be at an additional salary). The contract included NBA buyout clauses in the amounts of €1.1 million for 2014, and €750,000 for 2015.

Barcelona went on to win the 2013–14 Spanish Liga ACB championship.

=== Houston Rockets (2014–2015) ===
On 28 June 2012, Papanikolaou was selected with the 48th overall pick in the 2012 NBA draft by the New York Knicks. On July 16, 2012, his draft rights were acquired by the Portland Trail Blazers, via a trade that sent Raymond Felton to the Knicks.

On 10 July 2013, Papanikolaou's rights were acquired by the Houston Rockets, via a trade that sent Thomas Robinson to the Trail Blazers.

On 23 September 2014, Papanikolaou signed with the Houston Rockets. On 13 February 2015, he took part in the Rising Stars Challenge of the NBA All-Star Game; in spite of an injury-plagued rookie season, during which he averaged 4.2 points and 2.7 rebounds per game, while coming off the bench, the Rockets decided to pick up his team option for the 2015–16 season.

=== Denver Nuggets (2015–2016) ===
On 20 July 2015, the Rockets traded Papanikolaou, Joey Dorsey, Nick Johnson, Pablo Prigioni, a 2016 first-round draft pick, and cash considerations to the Denver Nuggets, in exchange for Ty Lawson and a 2017 second-round draft pick. On 25 September 2015, he was waived by the Nuggets. He later re-signed with Denver on November 5, 2015, and made his debut for the team that night. He was waived again by the Nuggets on 7 January 2016, before his salary became fully guaranteed.

=== Return to Olympiacos (2016–present) ===
On 20 January 2016, Papanikolaou signed a two-and-a-half-year deal with Olympiacos, returning to the club for a second stint. On 5 July 2018, Papanikolaou and Olympiacos officially agreed on a new three-year contract extension. He signed another three-year extension on 22 September 2020. On July 6, 2023, Papanikolaou renewed his contract with the Greek club through 2026. On July 10, 2026, he received a new two-year contract through the 2027–2028 season.

== National team career ==
=== Greek junior national ===
As a member of the junior national basketball teams of Greece, Papanikolaou won the silver medal at the 2007 FIBA Europe Under-18 Championship and the gold medal at the 2008 FIBA Europe Under-18 Championship. He also won the silver medal at the 2009 FIBA Under-19 World Cup. Papanikolaou also won the gold medal at the 2009 FIBA Europe Under-20 Championship, where he was also named to the All-Tournament Team and won the MVP award. He then won the silver medal at the 2010 FIBA Europe Under-20 Championship with Greece's junior national team, where he was also named to the All-Tournament Team.

=== Greek senior national team ===
In August 2009, Papanikolaou made his debut with the senior men's Greek national basketball team, in a friendly game. With Greece's senior national team, he then played at EuroBasket 2011, the 2012 FIBA World Olympic Qualifying Tournament, the EuroBasket 2013, the 2014 FIBA World Cup, the EuroBasket 2015, the EuroBasket 2017, the 2019 FIBA World Cup, and the EuroBasket 2022. He has appeared in 134 games for the senior national side and has scored a total of 842 points.

== Player profile ==
An off-ball player, Papanikolaou can play the positions 2-4 comfortably. He is considered to be an effective shooter from 3-point range, and also often attacks close-outs and finishes strong at the rim. On the other side of the ball, Papanikolaou is widely considered to be an elite defender, he was the 2017 Greek League Best Defender, winning the same honor in the Spanish ACB League in the 2014 season. He has also been recognized as a leader, captaining Olympiacos to the Euroleague Championship Game in 2023 & 2026.

== Awards and accomplishments ==
=== Titles won and Other honors ===
- EuroLeague
  - Champion (3×): 2012, 2013, 2026 (with Olympiacos Piraeus)
  - Finalist (3×): 2010, 2017, 2023 (with Olympiacos Piraeus)
  - Final Four Participation (10×): 2010, 2012, 2013, 2017, 2022, 2023, 2024, 2025, 2026 (with Olympiacos Piraeus), 2014 (with FC Barcelona)
- EuroLeague SuperCup
  - Finalist: 2026 (with Olympiacos Piraeus)
- Liga ACB
  - Champion: 2014 (with FC Barcelona)
- Catalan League
  - Champion: 2013 (with FC Barcelona)
- Greek League
  - Champion (6×): 2012, 2016, 2022, 2023, 2025, 2026 (with Olympiacos Piraeus)
  - Finalist (6×): 2010, 2011, 2013, 2017, 2018, 2024 (with Olympiacos Piraeus)
- Greek Cup
  - Winner (5×): 2010, 2011, 2022, 2023, 2024 (with Olympiacos Piraeus)
  - Finalist (5×): 2012, 2013, 2018, 2025, 2026 (with Olympiacos Piraeus)
- Greek Super Cup
  - Winner (5×): 2022, 2023, 2024, 2025, 2026 (with Olympiacos Piraeus)
- Spanish Cup
  - Finalist: 2014 (with FC Barcelona)
- Spanish Supercup
  - Finalist: 2013 (with FC Barcelona)

=== Greek national team ===
- 2025 EuroBasket: Bronze

=== Greek junior national team ===
- 2007 FIBA Europe Under-18 Championship: Silver
- 2008 Albert Schweitzer Tournament: Gold
- 2008 FIBA Europe Under-18 Championship: Gold
- 2009 FIBA Under-19 World Cup: Silver
- 2010 FIBA Europe Under-20 Championship: Silver

=== Individual awards and accomplishments ===
==== European awards ====
- EuroLeague Rising Star: (2013)
- EuroLeague Finals Top Scorer: (2012)
- 2× EuroLeague MVP of the Round
- Eurohoops.com's EuroLeague Best Defender: (2018)
- 5× Euroleague Best Defensive Players: (2017, 2018, 2019, 2022, 2023)
- Brainbasketball.com's All-Euroleague Defensive Team: (2020)

==== Domestic awards ====
- 5× All-Greek League Team: (2012, 2013, 2017, 2023, 2024)
- 5× Greek League All-Star: (2013, 2018, 2019, 2022, 2023)
- 2× Greek League Best Young Player: (2009, 2012)
- Eurobasket.com's All-Greek League Player of the Year (2012)
- 6× Eurobasket.com's All-Greek League Domestic Team: (2012, 2013, 2017, 2023, 2024, 2025)

==== Club team awards ====
- Olympiacos Piraeus' All-Time EuroLeague Rebounding Leader
- Olympiacos Piraeus' All-Time EuroLeague Steals Leader
- Olympiacos Piraeus' All-Time Greek League Steals Leader
- Olympiacos Small Forward of the Decade: 2010–20

==== Youth club awards ====
- Greek Youth All-Star Game MVP: (2009)
- Panhellenic Youth Championship MVP: (2009)
- All-Panhellenic Youth Championship Team Team: (2009)
- Panhellenic Youth Championship Best Defender: (2009)

==== Greek Youth national team awards ====
- FIBA U20 EuroBasket MVP: 2009
- All-FIBA U20 EuroBasket Team: 2009
- All-FIBA U20 EuroBasket Team: 2010

== Club career statistics ==
Legend
GP	Games played	GS	Games started	MPG	Minutes per game
FG%	Field-goal percentage	3P%	3-point field-goal percentage	FT%	Free-throw percentage
RPG	Rebounds per game	APG	Assists per game	SPG	Steals per game
BPG	Blocks per game	PPG	Points per game	PIR	Performance index rating
**Bold**	Career high

=== NBA ===
==== Regular season ====
Year	Team	GP	GS	MPG	FG%	3P%	FT%	RPG	APG	SPG	BPG	PPG
2014–15	Houston	**43**	1	**18.5**	.350	.292	**.722**	**2.7**	**2.0**	**.7**	**.3**	**4.2**
2015–16	Denver	26	**6**	11.3	**.364**	**.313**	.643	1.5	.6	.5	.2	2.6
Career		69	7	15.8	.354	.297	.688	2.3	1.5	.6	.3	3.6

==== Playoffs ====
Year	Team	GP	GS	MPG	FG%	3P%	FT%	RPG	APG	SPG	BPG	PPG
2015	Houston	8	0	2.6	.250	.000	.500	.3	—	—	—	0.4
Career		8	0	2.6	.250	.000	.500	.3	—	—	—	0.4

=== EuroLeague ===
†	Denotes season in which Papanikolaou won the EuroLeague
*	Led the league

Year	Team	GP	GS	MPG	FG%	3P%	FT%	RPG	APG	SPG	BPG	PPG	PIR
2009–10	Olympiacos	6	1	6.4	.250	.000	.500	1.2	.8	.5	—	.8	2.0
2010–11	Olympiacos	16	14	13.7	.447	.435	.647	3.1	.3	.6	.1	3.9	4.6
2011–12†	Olympiacos	22	13	19.8	.490	.333	.688	3.4	.6	.5	.3	6.1	7.4
2012–13†	Olympiacos	31*	30	23.8	.497	**.521***	.723	4.4	1.4	.9	**.7**	**8.7**	**11.7**
2013–14	Barcelona	28	27	25.0	.507	.361	.500	3.4	2.2	.8	.5	6.9	8.5
2015–16	Olympiacos	7	5	18.9	.410	.118	.583	4.3	1.0	.6	.4	5.9	5.9
2016–17	Olympiacos	37*	32	23.3	.422	.316	.826	**4.8**	1.5	1.2	.4	8.1	9.7
2017–18	Olympiacos	28	23	24.0	.469	.373	.775	4.3	2.1	1.0	.4	8.3	11.3
2018–19	Olympiacos	30	23	23.4	.431	.371	.738	3.9	1.6	.8	.3	6.9	8.1
2019–20	Olympiacos	26	21	23.9	.481	.391	.708	3.6	1.5	**1.4**	.3	8.5	9.4
2020–21	Olympiacos	14	13	21.7	.365	.370	**.895**	2.2	2.0	.6	.5	5.7	5.9
2021–22	Olympiacos	37	37	23.4	.408	.331	.758	2.5	1.6	.9	.2	6.6	6.6
2022–23	Olympiacos	**38**	**38**	**25.3**	**.526**	.429	.729	3.8	2.0	.7	.2	**8.7**	10.3
2023–24	Olympiacos	**38**	33	25.1	.435	.362	.652	3.6	**2.7**	.8	.1	7.4	9.3
2024–25	Olympiacos	**38**	29	18.4	.446	.340	.692	2.8	2.1	.6	.3	4.8	6.2
2025–26†	Olympiacos	36	21	14.3	.356	.311	.286	1.8	1.6	.4	.1	2.9	2.3
Career		432	360	21.9	.450	.367	.717	3.5	1.7	.8	.3	6.7	8.0

=== EuroCup ===
Year	Team	GP	GS	MPG	FG%	3P%	FT%	RPG	APG	SPG	BPG	PPG	PIR
2008–09	Aris Thessaloniki	2	0	2.0	.333	.000	—	—	—	—	.5	1.0	0.5
Career		2	0	2.0	.333	.000	—	—	—	—	.5	1.0	0.5

=== Domestic leagues ===
†	Denotes season in which Papanikolaou won a league title

Year	Team	League	GP	MPG	FG%	3P%	FT%	RPG	APG	SPG	BPG	PPG
2008–09	(Greece) Aris Thessaloniki	HEBA A1	12	4.6	.250	.200	1.000	.4	.3	.4	.1	0.8
2009–10	(Greece) Olympiacos	HEBA A1	19	11.3	.439	.250	.727	1.4	.7	.5	.4	2.6
2010–11	(Greece) Olympiacos	HEBA A1	31	16.8	.500	.208	.651	3.5	.9	1.0	.3	5.9
2011–12†	(Greece) Olympiacos	HEBA A1	32	20.8	.497	.348	.684	4.6	.7	1.1	.3	7.7
2012–13	(Greece) Olympiacos	GBL	34	22.3	.569	.400	.635	4.1	1.7	1.1	.6	9.2
2013–14†	(Spain) Barcelona	ACB	40	23.7	.448	.333	.787	4.0	1.0	.8	.3	6.6
2015–16†	(Greece) Olympiacos	GBL	19	20.0	.524	.345	.683	4.3	1.6	1.1	.2	9.4
2016–17	(Greece) Olympiacos	GBL	29	21.7	.487	.371	.763	4.6	1.3	.9	.2	9.3
2017–18	(Greece) Olympiacos	GBL	30	22.8	.506	.316	.738	4.9	2.0	.8	.5	8.3
2018–19	(Greece) Olympiacos	GBL	22	23.4	.444	.328	.730	3.1	2.4	1.1	.2	7.3
2021–22†	(Greece) Olympiacos	GBL	29	21.6	.477	.400	.688	3.1	2.3	1.0	.2	7.0
2022–23†	(Greece) Olympiacos	GBL	28	22.3	.470	.347	.667	3.0	3.2	.8	.4	7.8
2023–24	(Greece) Olympiacos	GBL	33	23.3	.474	.367	.694	4.0	2.8	.7	.2	8.4
2024–25†	(Greece) Olympiacos	GBL	28	18.5	.493	.322	.645	3.3	1.9	.7	.1	6.3
2025–26†	(Greece) Olympiacos	GBL	29	20.0	.525	.404	.474	2.2	2.7	.6	.1	5.9

== Greece national team career statistics ==
*	Denotes tournaments in which Papanikolaou won a Gold medal (first place)
***	Denotes tournaments in which Papanikolaou won a Bronze medal (third place)

Year	Tournament	National Team	GP	GS	MPG	FG%	3P%	FT%	RPG	APG	SPG	BPG	PPG
2011	EuroBasket	Greece Men	11	0	18.7	.419	.286	.688	3.3	1.1	.6	.2	3.7
2012	World OQT	Greece Men	3	3	25.7	.619	.455	.714	3.3	2.7	.0	.0	12.0
2013	EuroBasket	Greece Men	7	4	19.9	.607	.500	.500	2.3	.9	1.0	.3	6.3
2014	World Cup	Greece Men	6	6	22.0	.457	.110	.545	3.2	1.7	.8	1.2	6.5
2015	EuroBasket	Greece Men	5	0	10.0	.444	.000	.500	1.4	.8	.8	.2	1.8
2017	EuroBasket	Greece Men	7	3	26.3	.516	.333	.632	4.7	1.9	1.6	.7	6.7
2019	World Cup QT	Greece Men	2	2	31.0	.529	.500	.500	4.5	.5	.5	.0	11.5
2019	World Cup	Greece Men	5	2	22.8	.200	.143	1.000	4.0	1.4	.6	1.0	3.8
2022	EuroBasket	Greece Men	7	7	25.6	.417	.333	.714	5.4	1.9	1.6	.3	7.0
2023	World Cup QT	Greece Men	3	3	32.0	.455	.286	1.000	4.3	2.0	1.7	1.0	8.7
2023	World Cup	Greece Men	5	3	25.6	.389	.182	1.000	3.6	2.0	1.0	.5	7.0
2024	EuroBasket QT	Greece Men	2	2	32.5	.500	.118	.833	9.0	4.5	1.5	.5	15.0
2024	World OQT	Greece Men	4	4	24.8	.481	.250	.667	2.3	2.0	.8	.3	7.8
2024	Summer Olympics	Greece Men	4	4	32.0	.414	.400	.714	5.8	2.3	1.0	.5	9.3
2025	EuroBasket	Greece Men	9	9	26.3	.422	.364	.700	4.8	2.4	.7	.4	6.3
