= Olympias Patras B.C. =

A.E.P. Olympias Patras
- Founded: 1961; 65 years ago
- History: Olympiada Patras B.C. (1961–present)
- Arena: Dimitris Tofalos Arena; Olympiada Indoor Hall
- Capacity: 4,150; 2,500
- Location: Patras, Greece
- Team colors: Orange and White
- President: Nikolaos Bogonikolos
- Head coach: Takis Kalatzis
- Championships: 1 Greek A2 Championship
- Website: olympiasclub.org
Home	Away

A.E.P. Olympias Patras B.C. (Greek: Α.Ε.Π. Ολυμπιάς), is a Greek professional basketball club that is located in Patras, Greece. The club is also known as Olimpiada Patron B.C.

== Logos ==
(The former official logo of the club.)

(The current official logo of the club.)

== History ==
The basketball team participated in the Greek A2 League from 1977 until 1981. The club competed in the top Greek League in the 2006–07 season and the 2007–08 season. Olympias Patras' basketball club also participated in the FIBA EuroCup during the 2007–08 season.

== Arenas ==
Olympias' home arena is the 2,500 seat Olympiada Indoor Hall. The club has also used the 4,150 seat Dimitris Tofalos Arena, to host home games.

== Titles ==
- Greek A2 League
  - Champions (1): 2005–06
- Greek C League
  - Champions (1): 2002–03
- Achaea Regional Champion
  - Champions (4): 1965, 1967, 1968, 1998

== Season by season ==
Season	Tier	League	Pos.	Greek Cup	European competitions		
2004–05	3	B League	1st				
2005–06	2	A2 League	1st				
2006–07	1	A1 League	10th				
2007–08	1	A1 League	14th		3 FIBA EuroCup	QR2	3–1
2008–09	2	A2 League	12th				
2009–10	2	A2 League	5th				
2010–11	2	A2 League	14th				
2011–12	4	C League	11th				
2012–	Lower divisions						

== Notable players ==
Note: Flags indicate national team eligibility at FIBA-sanctioned events. Players may hold other non-FIBA nationalities not displayed.

Criteria

To appear in this section a player must have either:

- Set a club record or won an individual award while at the club
- Played at least one official international match for their national team at any time
- Played at least one official NBA match at any time.

- (Greece) Ilias Tomaras
- (Greece) Vassilis Malakis
- (Greece) Dimitris Spanoulis
- (Greece) Kostas Charissis
- (Greece) Antonis Asimakopoulos
- (Greece) Ioannis Gagaloudis
- (Greece) Nikos Kourtis
- (Greece) Giorgos Theodorakos
- (Greece) Angelos Tsamis
- (Greece) Kostas Kakaroudis
- (Slovenia) Simon Petrov
- (Bosnia and Herzegovina) Aleksej Nešović
- (Serbia) Branko Jorović
- (Czech Republic) / (United States) Maurice Whitfield
- (United States) Steve Burtt, Jr.
- (United States) Rod Brown
- (United States) Derrick Dial
- (Puerto Rico) Guillermo Diaz

== Head coaches ==
- (Greece) Dimitris Tsolakis
- (Greece) Yannis Christopoulos
- (Greece) Nikos Oikonomou
