= EuroLeague 25th Anniversary Team =

Basketball team

The EuroLeague 25th Anniversary Team, also referred to as the All-25 EuroLeague Team, was chosen in 2025 to honor the 25th anniversary of the founding of the EuroLeague.

There were 100 players nominated for the 25 spots on All-25 EuroLeague Team. Voting included votes from selected media members (contributing 10%) and fans (also 10%), as well as from EuroLeague-winning head coaches (contributing 40%) and players who had either won the MVP award or had been selected to an All-EuroLeague Team (accounting for 40%).

== The EuroLeague 25th Anniversary Team ==
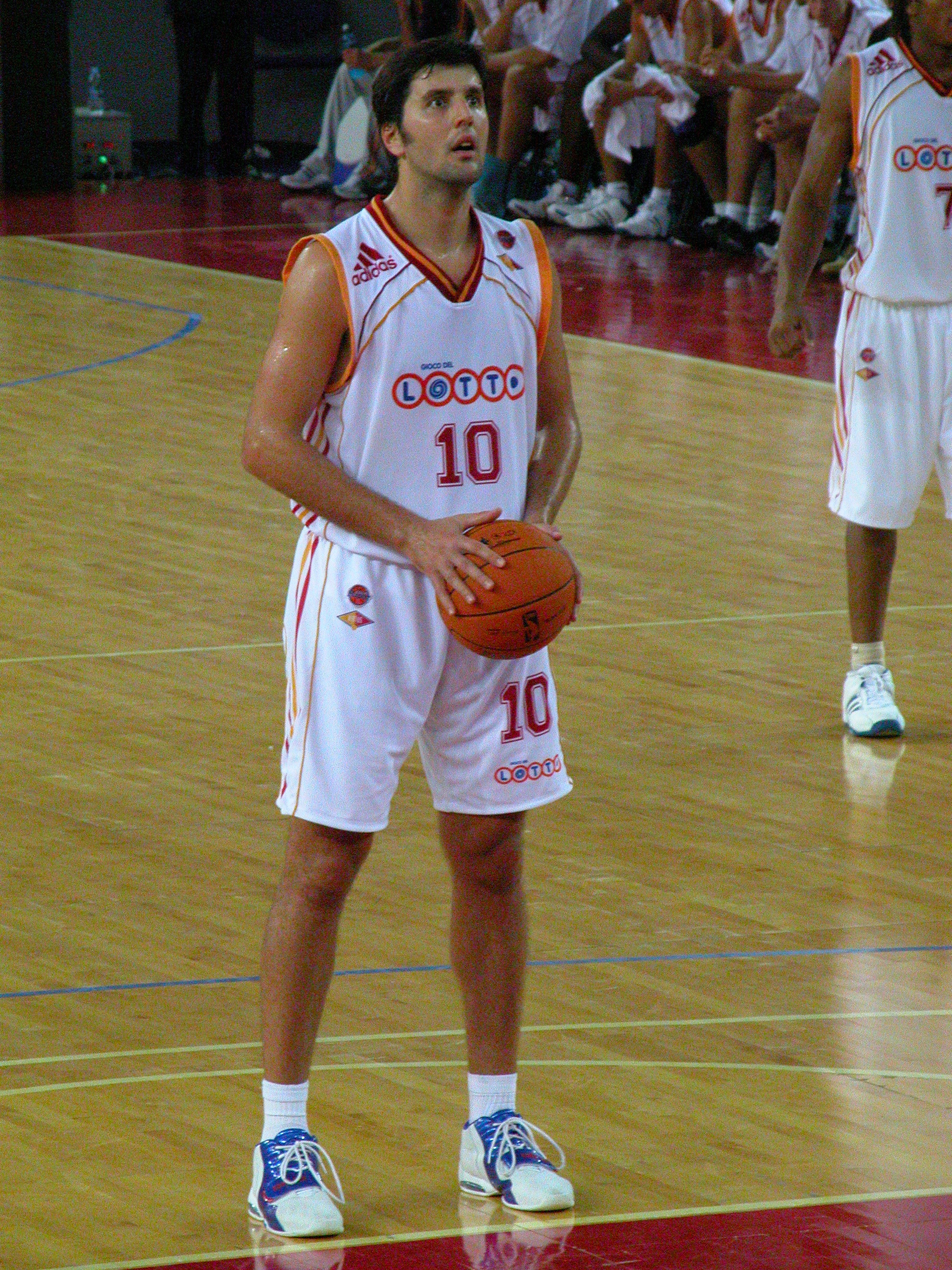
Dejan Bodiroga named EuroLeague 2000–2010 Player of the Decade

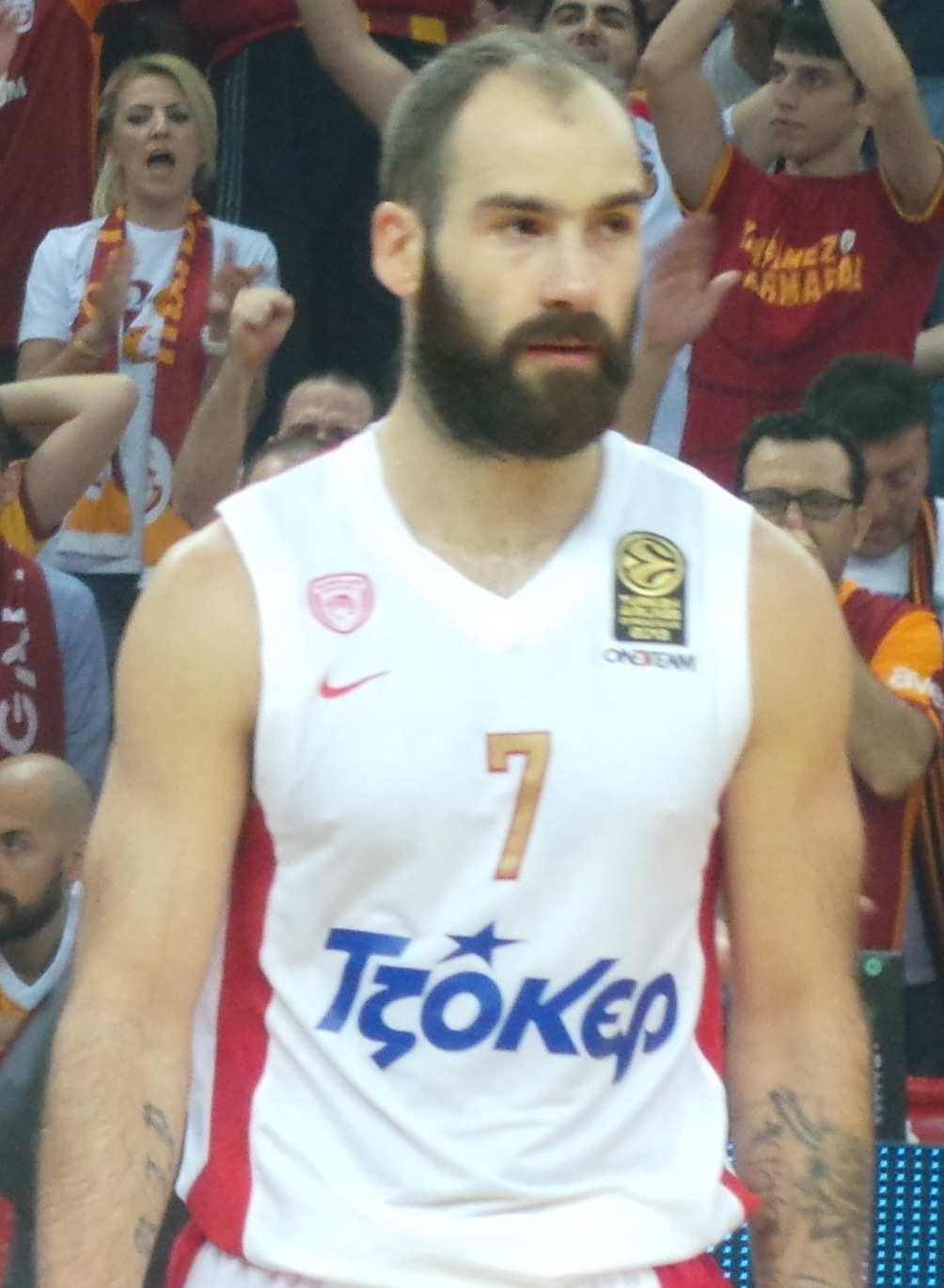
Vassilis Spanoulis named EuroLeague 2010–2020 Player of the Decade

EuroLeague 25th Anniversary Team
Player (Alphabetical Order)	Position	Ref.
(United States) Michael Batiste	PF/C	
(Serbia) Dejan Bodiroga	SF	
(Serbia) Bogdan Bogdanović	SG	
(France) Nando de Colo	SG/PG	
(Greece) Dimitris Diamantidis	PG	
(Slovenia) Luka Dončić	PG/SG	
(Spain) Rudy Fernández	SF/SG	
(Argentina) Manu Ginóbili	SG	
(United States) Kyle Hines	C	
(United States) Mike James	SG	
(Lithuania) Šarūnas Jasikevičius	PG	
(Turkey) Shane Larkin	PG/SG	
(Spain) Sergio Llull	SG/PG	
(Serbia) Vasilije Micić	PG	
(Spain) Juan Carlos Navarro	SG	
(Greece) Theodoros Papaloukas	PG	
(United States) Anthony Parker	SG/SF	
(Greece) Georgios Printezis	PF	
(Spain) Sergio Rodríguez	PG	
(Greece) Kostas Sloukas	PG/SG	
(Greece) Vassilis Spanoulis	PG	
(Lithuania) Ramūnas Šiškauskas	SG/SF	
(Cape Verde) Walter Tavares	C	
(Serbia) Miloš Teodosić	PG	
(Croatia) Nikola Vujčić	C	

=== Players by country ===
Country	#	Players
Greece	5	Diamantidis, Papaloukas, Printezis, Sloukas, Spanoulis
Serbia	4	Bodiroga, Bogdanović, Micić, Teodosić
Spain	4	Fernández, Llull, Navarro, Rodríguez
(United States) USA	4	Batiste, Hines, James, Parker
Lithuania	2	Jasikevičius, Šiškauskas
Argentina	1	Ginóbili
Cape Verde	1	Tavares
Croatia	1	Vujčić
France	1	De Colo
Slovenia	1	Dončić
Turkey	1	Larkin

== The fan's 25th Anniversary Team vote ==
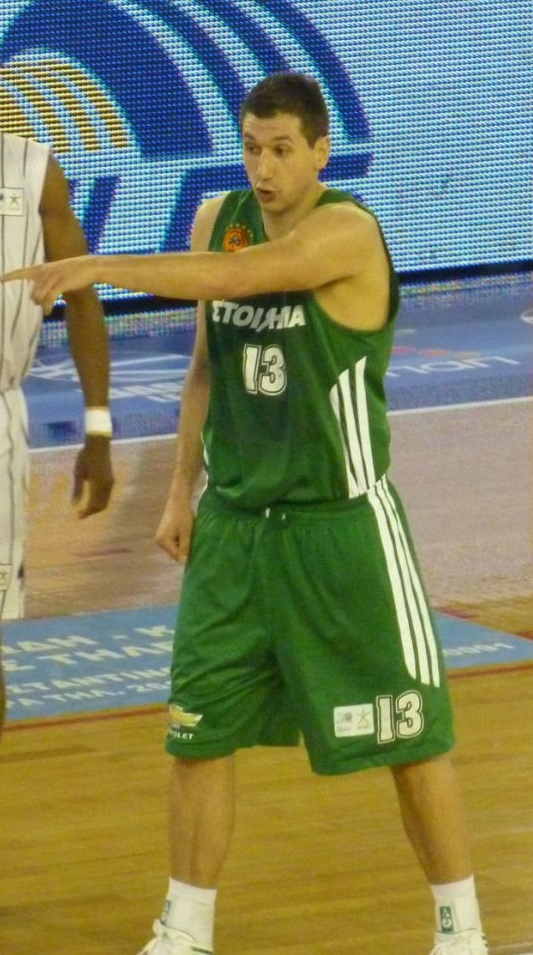
Dimitris Diamantidis voted best player in EuroLeague history by fans

The results of the fan voting were as follows:

- (Players listed in **bold** were selected to the 25th Anniversary Team)

Dimitris Diamantidis was voted the best player of the EuroLeague's first 25 years.

EuroLeague 25th Anniversary Team Vote
Player	Finish in the Voting
(Greece) **Dimitris Diamantidis**	#1
(Lithuania) **Šarūnas Jasikevičius**	#2
(Greece) **Vassilis Spanoulis**	#3
(Serbia) **Dejan Bodiroga**	#4
(Greece) **Theodoros Papaloukas**	#5
(Greece) **Kostas Sloukas**	#6
(Spain) **Juan Carlos Navarro**	#7
(United States) **Mike Batiste**	#8
(Greece) **Georgios Printezis**	#9
(United States) **Kyle Hines**	#10
(United States) **Mike James**	#11
(Spain) **Sergio Llull**	#12
(Serbia) **Vasilije Micić**	#13
(Turkey) **Shane Larkin**	#14
(Slovenia) **Luka Dončić**	#15
(Spain) **Sergio Rodriguez**	#16
(France) **Nando de Colo**	#17
(Greece) Antonis Fotsis	#18
(Greece) Nick Calathes	#19
(Greece) Fragiskos Alvertis	#20
(Serbia) **Miloš Teodosić**	#21
(Serbia) **Bogdan Bogdanović**	#22
(Cape Verde) **Walter Tavares**	#23
(Lithuania) **Ramūnas Šiškauskas**	#24
(Spain) **Rudy Fernández**	#25

=== Players by country ===
Country	#	Players
Greece	8	Alvertis, Calathes, **Diamantidis**, Fotsis, **Papaloukas**, **Printezis**, **Sloukas**, **Spanoulis**
Serbia	4	**Bodiroga**, **Bogdanović**, **Micić**, **Teodosić**
Spain	4	**Fernández**, **Llull**, **Navarro**, **Rodriguez**
(United States) USA	3	**Batiste**, **Hines**, **James**
Lithuania	2	**Jasikevičius**, **Šiškauskas**
Cape Verde	1	**Tavares**
France	1	**De Colo**
Slovenia	1	**Dončić**
Turkey	1	**Larkin**

== See also ==
- EuroLeague 2000–2010 All-Decade Team
- EuroLeague 2010–2020 All-Decade Team
- 50 Greatest EuroLeague Contributors (2008)
- EuroLeague Legend
- Olympic Order
- FIBA's 50 Greatest Players (1991)
- FIBA Order of Merit
- FIBA Hall of Fame
