= 2009–10 Greek Basket League =

2009–10 Greek Basket League season
- League: Greek Basket League
- Sport: Basketball
- Duration: 24 October 2009 – 8 June 2010
- Teams: 14
- TV partner(s): SKAI TV, ERT, Nova Sports

Regular Season
- Season champions: Panathinaikos
- Season MVP: (United States) Mike Batiste
- Top scorer: (United States) Josh Childress 391 Points (16.2 PPG)

Playoffs

Finals
- Champions: Panathinaikos
- Runners-up: Olympiacos
- Finals MVP: (United States) Mike Batiste

Greek Basket League seasons
- ← 2008–09 2010–11 →

The 2009–10 Greek Basket League season was the 70th season of the Greek Basket League, the highest tier professional basketball league in Greece. The winner was Panathinaikos that won Olympiacos in the finals of the championship.

== Teams ==
Location of teams in Greek Basket League 2009–10

Club	Home city
AEK Athens	Athens
Aris	Thessaloniki
Ilysiakos	Ilisia, Athens
Kavala	Kavala
Kolossos Rodou	Rhodes
Maroussi	Maroussi, Athens
Olympia Larissa	Larissa
Olympiacos	Piraeus
Panathinaikos	Athens
Panellinios	Athens
Panionios	Nea Smyrni, Athens
PAOK	Thessaloniki
Peristeri	Peristeri, Athens
Trikala 2000	Trikala

== Regular season ==
=== Standings ===
Position	Team	Total							Home		Away	
		Pts	Pld	W	L	F	A	D	W	L	W	L
1.	Panathinaikos	51	26	25	1	2297	1748	+549	13	0	12	1
2.	Olympiacos	49	26	23	3	2355	1925	+430	13	0	10	3
3.	Maroussi	45	26	19	7	2002	1823	+179	10	3	9	4
4.	Panellinios	41	26	15	11	2022	1935	+87	9	4	6	7
5.	PAOK	41	26	15	11	1999	1883	+116	10	3	5	8
6.	Kolossos	40	26	14	12	1877	1907	-40	9	4	5	8
7.	Aris	38	26	12	14	1887	1886	+1	9	4	3	10
8.	Panionios	38	26	12	14	1930	1959	-29	9	4	3	10
9.	Peristeri	38	26	12	14	1957	2036	-79	10	3	2	11
10.	AEK	35	26	9	17	1836	2032	-196	6	7	3	10
11.	Kavala	34	26	8	18	1888	2021	-133	7	6	1	12
12.	Ilysiakos	33	26	7	19	1843	2018	-175	6	7	1	12
13.	Trikala	33	26	7	19	1916	2137	-221	6	7	1	12
14.	Olympia	30	26	4	22	1745	2137	-402	4	9	0	13

Pts=Points, Pld=Matches played, W=Matches won, L=Matches lost, F=Points for, A=Points against, D=Points difference

Qualification to League Playoffs
Relegation to HEBA A2

== Playoffs ==
Teams in italics had home advantage. Teams in bold won the playoff series. Numbers to the left of each team indicate the team's original playoff seeding. Numbers to the right indicate the score of each playoff game.

Quarterfinals
**1**	**Panathinaikos**	**92**	**107**	–
8	Panionios	57	59	–
**4**	**Panellinios**	**71**	**80**	–
5	PAOK	69	66	–
**2**	**Olympiacos**	**75**	**85**	–
7	Aris	63	75	–
**3**	**Maroussi**	**87**	**87**	–
6	Kolossos	68	72	–

Semifinals
**1**	**Panathinaikos**	**88**	**75**	**75**	–	–
4	Panellinios	58	73	65	–	–
**2**	**Olympiacos**	**69**	**73**	**89**	–	–
3	Maroussi	53	72	77	–	–

Finals
1	**Panathinaikos**	**73**	72	**79**	**76**	–
**2**	Olympiacos	54	**79**	70	69	–
EuroLeague Qualification Rounds Match
3	**Maroussi**	**75**	**90**	78	79	**70**
4	Panellinios	70	72	**97**	**86**	60

== Final league standings ==
Position	Team	Overall Record		
		**Games**	**Wins**	**Losses**
1.	Panathinaikos	35	33	2
2.	Olympiacos	35	29	6
3.	Maroussi	36	24	12
4.	Panellinios	36	19	17
5.	PAOK	28	15	13
6.	Kolossos	28	14	14
7.	Aris	28	12	16
8.	Panionios	28	12	16
9.	Peristeri	26	12	14
10.	AEK	26	9	17
11.	Kavala	26	8	18
12.	Ilysiakos	26	7	19
13.	Trikala	26	7	19
14.	Olympia	26	4	22

2010–11 Euroleague Regular Season
2010–11 Euroleague Qualification Round
Eurocup 2010–11 Regular Season
Eurocup 2010–11 Qualification Round
Relegation to HEBA A2 2010–11

- Maroussi forfeited their place in the 2010–11 Euroleague Qualification Round.
- Aris took the place of Kolossos in the Eurocup 2010–11 Qualification Round.

Greek Basket League 2009–10
Champions
**Panathinaikos**
**31st Title**

== Awards ==
=== Greek League MVP ===
- (United States) Mike Batiste – Panathinaikos

=== Greek League Finals MVP ===
- (United States) Mike Batiste – Panathinaikos

=== All-Greek League Team ===
- (Greece) Dimitris Diamantidis – Panathinaikos
- (United States) Drew Nicholas – Panathinaikos
- (United States) Josh Childress – Olympiacos
- (Greece) Kostas Kaimakoglou – Maroussi
- (United States) Mike Batiste – Panathinaikos

=== Best Coach ===
- (Greece) Giorgos Bartzokas – Maroussi

=== Best Young Player ===
- (Greece) Nikos Pappas – Kolossos

=== Most Improved Player ===
- (Greece) Kostas Kaimakoglou – Marousi

== Statistical leaders ==
Greek Basket League stats leaders are counted by totals, rather than averages, and include both regular season.

=== Points ===
Pos.	Player	Club	Total points
**1.**	(United States) **Josh Childress**	Olympiacos	**391**
2.	(United States) Lance Harris	Kolossos	374
3.	(United States) Taurean Green	AEK	366
4.	(Greece) Lazaros Papadopoulos	PAOK	363
5.	(United States) Chris Monroe	PAOK	363

Rebounds

Pos	Player	Club	Total Rebounds
**1.**	(United States) **Jeremiah Massey**	Olympia Larissa	**192**
2.	(United States) Torin Francis	AEK	181
3.	(United States) Robert Dozier	Kolossos	168
4.	(Greece) Lazaros Papadopoulos	PAOK	168
5.	(United States) Warren Carter	Ilysiakos	166

=== Assists ===
Pos.	Player	Club	Total Assists
**1.**	(United States) **Jamon Gordon**	Maroussi	**108**
2.	(Greece) Sakis Karidas	Ilysiakos	104
3.	(Serbia) Miloš Teodosić	Olympiacos	102
4.	(Greece) Dimitris Diamantidis	Panathinaikos	102
5.	(United States) Cliff Hammonds	Peristeri	97

=== Steals ===
Pos.	Player	Club	Total Steals
**1.**	(United States) **Vonteego Cummings**	Ilysiakos	**54**
2.	(United States) Jamon Gordon	Maroussi	47
3.	(Greece) Nikos Katsares	Trikala	45
4.	(United States) Cliff Hammonds	Peristeri	39
5.	(Greece) Makis Nikolaidis	AEK	39

=== Blocks ===
Pos.	Player	Club	Total Blocks
**1.**	(Greece) **Ian Vougioukas**	Panellinios	**37**
2.	(Greece) Kostas Charissis	Kolossos	27
3.	(United States) Jared Homan	Maroussi	22
4.	(Greece) Antonis Fotsis	Panathinaikos	21
5.	(Greece) Dimitrios Mavroeidis	Maroussi	20

== Clubs in international competitions ==
Team	Competition	Result
Olympiacos	EuroLeague	Final Four, 2nd place
Panathinaikos	EuroLeague	Top 16, 3rd place
Maroussi	EuroLeague	Top 16, 4th place
Aris	EuroLeague	Qualifying rounds, First preliminary round
Panellinios	EuroCup	Final-4, 3rd place
Aris	EuroCup	Playoffs, Quarterfinals
