= Dimos Dikoudis =

Greek basketball player

Dimos Dikoudis Δήμος Ντικούδης
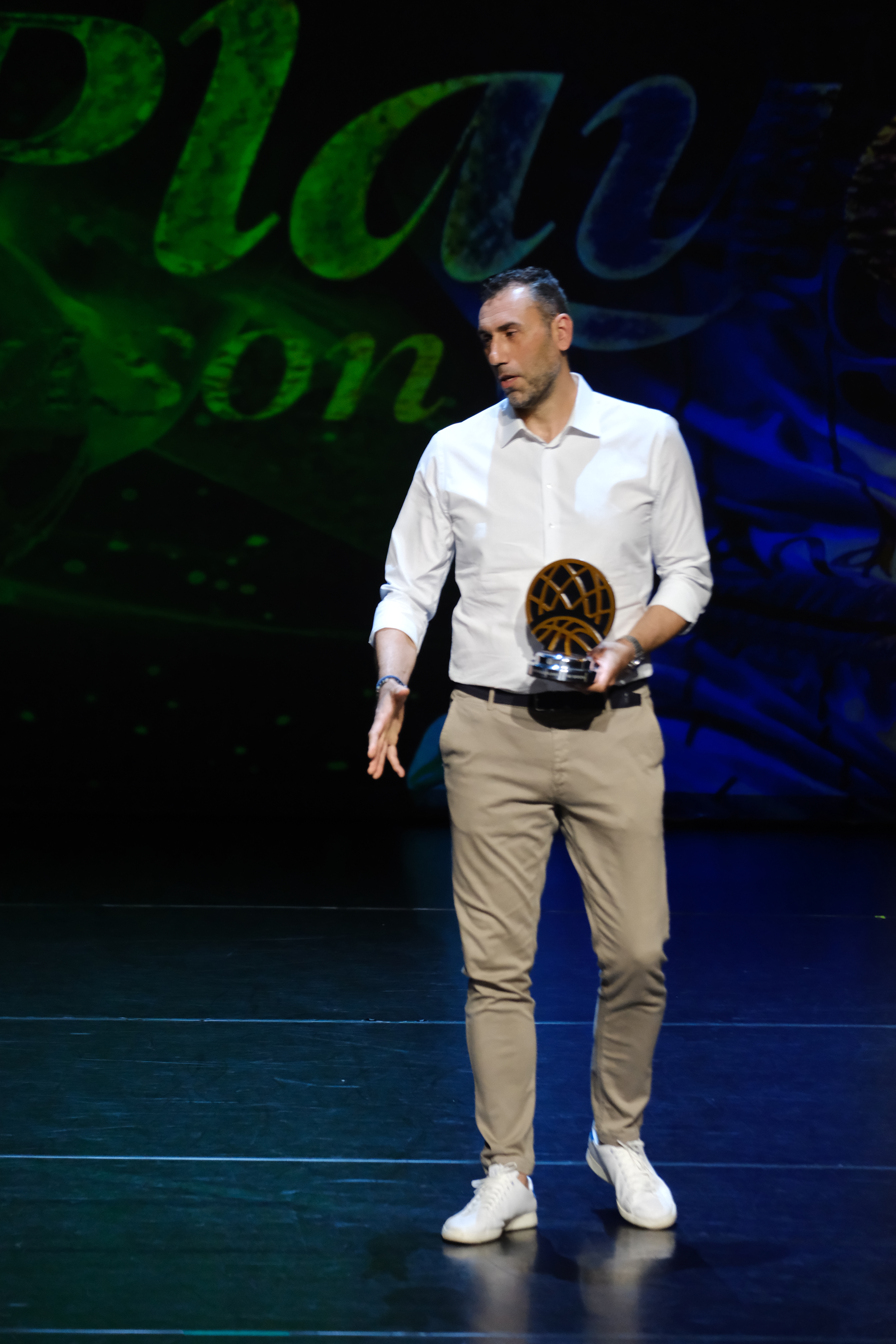

Personal information
- Born: June 24, 1977 (age 49) Larissa, Greece
- Listed height: 6 ft 10 in (2.08 m)
- Listed weight: 250 lb (113 kg)

Career information
- NBA draft: 1999: undrafted
- Playing career: 1995–2012
- Position: Power forward / center

Career history
- 1995–1998: Olympia Larissa
- 1998–2003: AEK Athens
- 2003–2004: Valencia
- 2004–2005: CSKA Moscow
- 2005–2006: Valencia
- 2006–2008: Panathinaikos
- 2008: Valencia
- 2008–2009: Panionios
- 2009–2010: Aris
- 2010–2011: AEK Athens
- 2011–2012: PAOK

Career highlights
- EuroLeague champion (2007); Triple Crown winner (2007); FIBA EuroStar (2007); FIBA Saporta Cup champion (2000); 3× Greek League champion (2002, 2007, 2008); 4× Greek Cup winner (2000, 2001, 2007, 2008); Greek League MVP (2002); Greek League Finals MVP (2002); Greek League Best Young Player (2000); 6× Greek League All-Star (1999, 2001–2003, 2007, 2008); Greek League Hall of Fame (2022); Russian Championship champion (2005); Russian Cup winner (2005); Greek 2nd Division MVP (1998); 2× Greek 2nd Division Top Scorer (1997, 1998)
Medals
Event	1st	2nd	3rd
FIBA World Cup	0	1	0
FIBA Stanković World Cup	1	0	0
FIBA EuroBasket	1	0	0
Total	2	1	0
Men's basketball
Representing Greece
FIBA World Cup
Silver medal – second place	2006 Japan	
FIBA Stanković World Cup
Gold medal – first place	2006 China	
FIBA EuroBasket
Gold medal – first place	2005 Serbia & Montenegro	

Dimosthenis "Dimos" Dikoudis (alternate spellings include: Demosthenis, Demos, Ntikoudis) (Greek: Δημοσθένης "Δήμος" Ντικούδης; born June 24, 1977, in Larissa, Greece), is a former Greek professional basketball player and basketball executive. He is 2.08 m (6 ft 10 in) tall, and he played as a power forward-center. Dikoudis was inducted into the Greek Basket League Hall of Fame in 2022.

== Early years ==
Dikoudis started playing football at the age of 10, and later he was involved in Taekwondo. After two years of martial arts, he started playing basketball in his school team. With his school, he won the city championship, which was his first title, and right after that, he joined his first club, Perseas of Larissa. He played there until age 18, and he won four city and state championships there. With this club, he also won a national title, and was a member of the all state team.

== Professional career ==
In 1995, Dikoudis signed his first contract with Olympia Larissas. He played there for three seasons, one in the semi-professional level Greek National B League, and two in the professional level Greek 2nd Division. He was the leading scorer and leading rebounder in the Greek 2nd Division in both seasons, and the MVP of the Greek 2nd Division in the last season. He was also a member of the Greek Under-21 national team at that time.

In 1998, he signed a contract with the top-tier level Greek League club AEK Athens, and he played there for five seasons. As a member of AEK, he won the FIBA Saporta Cup, the Greek League championship, and two Greek Cups. He was voted the Greek League Best Young Player for the 1999–00 season, and the Greek League MVP for the 2001–02 season.

In 2003, he decided to leave Greece, and he signed with the Spanish League club Valencia. He played there for a year, and after that, he moved to CSKA Moscow, where he won the Russian Championship and the Russian Cup (the first in the history of the club). With CSKA that season, he played at the Final Four of the EuroLeague, which was held at Moscow, and was won by Maccabi Tel Aviv, which featured another player from Larissa, Nestoras Kommatos (he was a co-player with Dikoudis in Perseas).

In 2005, he returned to Valencia, and he played in the finals of the Spanish Cup. In the summer of 2006, he returned to Greece, and signed with Panathinaikos. With Panathinaikos, he won the Triple Crown in the 2006–07 season.

In December 2008, he joined Panionios. After joining Panionios, he became one of only two Greek players in history, along with Ioannis Giannoulis, to compete in the EuroLeague with 4 different teams. In July 2009, he moved to Aris Thessaloniki. After seven years, he returned to AEK Athens. In September 2011, he signed a one-year deal with PAOK.

== National team career ==
With the senior Greece national team, Dikoudis made his debut on November 24, 1999, against the Estonian National Team. As a member of the Greece national team, he played at the 2001 EuroBasket at Turkey, the 2003 EuroBasket at Sweden, and at the 2004 Summer Olympic Games of Athens. On September 25, 2005, he won the gold medal at the 2005 EuroBasket, with the Greece national team.

On September 3, 2006, he won the silver medal at the 2006 FIBA World Championship. He played at the 2007 EuroBasket.

== Managerial career ==
Dikoudis was appointed President of the Panhellenic Association of Paid Basketball Players (P.S.A.K.) in September 2006, with his term of office expiring in October 2010. Dikoudis became the Sports Director of the Greek League club AEK, in 2013. In 2021, he became the Administrative Manager of the senior Greece national team.

== Career statistics ==
Legend
GP	Games played	GS	Games started	MPG	Minutes per game
FG%	Field-goal percentage	3P%	3-point field-goal percentage	FT%	Free-throw percentage
RPG	Rebounds per game	APG	Assists per game	SPG	Steals per game
BPG	Blocks per game	PPG	Points per game	PIR	Performance index rating
**Bold**	Career high

=== EuroLeague ===
Year	Team	GP	GS	MPG	FG%	3P%	FT%	RPG	APG	SPG	BPG	PPG	PIR
2000–01	AEK	17	3	22.3	.460	.250	.617	5.4	.5	.7	.3	8.6	8.2
2001–02	AEK	19	16	29.5	.611	.393	.640	7.1	.7	.8	**.5**	**16.3**	**19.0**
2002–03	AEK	8	8	**32.5**	.506	.143	.771	**7.3**	.9	.9	.3	15.0	14.4
2003–04	Valencia	17	5	22.1	.548	.348	.573	5.0	.8	.7	.2	11.4	11.8
2004–05	CSKA Moscow	22	**18**	21.5	.592	.350	.682	5.2	**1.0**	**1.1**	.4	10.0	12.4
2006–07†	Panathinaikos	**23**	9	15.0	.624	**.435**	.610	3.7	.4	.3	.0	7.9	8.3
2007–08	Panathinaikos	20	10	14.3	**.631**	.412	.500	2.5	.2	.6	.0	6.0	5.1
2008–09	Panionios	4	2	21.2	.500	.250	**.800**	2.3	.0	.0	.0	6.3	3.5
Career		130	71	?	.566	.362	.629	4.8	.6	.7	.2	10.1	?

== Awards and accomplishments ==
=== Pro career ===
- 2× Eurobasket.com's Greek 2nd Division Player of the Year: (1997, 1998)
- 2× Greek 2nd Division Top Rebounder: (1997, 1998)
- 2× Greek 2nd Division Top Scorer: (1997, 1998)
- Greek 2nd Division MVP: (1998)
- Greek League Best Young Player: (2000)
- 4× Greek Cup Winner: (2000, 2001, 2007, 2008)
- FIBA Saporta Cup Champion: (2000)
- 6× Greek League All-Star: (1999, 2001, 2002, 2003, 2007, 2008)
- EuroLeague MVP of the Round: 2001–02 Regular season Round 7
- 3× Greek League Champion: (2002, 2007, 2008)
- Greek League MVP: (2002)
- Greek League Finals MVP: (2002)
- Russian Cup Winner: (2005)
- Russian Championship Champion: (2005)
- EuroLeague Champion: (2007)
- Triple Crown Winner: (2007)
- Greek League Hall of Fame: (2022)

=== Greece national team ===
- 5× Acropolis Tournament Champion: (2000, 2003, 2005, 2007, 2008)
- 2005 EuroBasket: Gold
- 2006 Stanković World Cup: Gold
- 2006 FIBA World Championship: Silver
- FIBA EuroStar: (2007)
