= Angelos Tsamis =

Greek basketball player

Angelos Tsamis Άγγελος Τσάμης
Personal information
- Born: October 2, 1981 (age 45) Kato Achaia, Greece
- Listed height: 6 ft 3.75 in (1.92 m)
- Listed weight: 215 lb (98 kg)

Career information
- Playing career: 2005–2023
- Position: Shooting guard

Career history
- 2005–2007: Olympiada Patras
- 2007–2008: AEK Athens
- 2008–2012: Kolossos Rodou
- 2012–2013: Limoges
- 2013–2015: Kolossos Rodou
- 2015–2017: Promitheas Patras
- 2017–2018: Holargos
- 2018–2019: Achayia '82
- 2019–2020: Apollon Patras
- 2020–2023: Mykonos

Career highlights
- French Super Cup winner (2012); Greek 2nd Division champion (2006); Greek 4th Division champion (2022)

Angelos Tsamis (alternate spelling: Aggelos) (Greek: Άγγελος Τσάμης; born October 2, 1981) is a Greek former professional basketball player. Born in Kato Achaia, Greece, he is a 1.92 m (6 ft 3 3/4 in) tall shooting guard.

== Professional career ==
Tsamis won the Greek 2nd Division championship with Olympias Patras in 2006. He also won the French Super Cup title with Limoges in 2012.

== Awards and accomplishments ==
- Greek 2nd Division: Champion (2006)
- French Super Cup: Winner (2012)
