= Antonios Asimakopoulos =

Greek professional basketball player

Antonios Asimakopoulos Αντώνης Ασημακόπουλος
No. 10 – Anatolia
- Position: Power forward

Personal information
- Born: July 24, 1976 (age 50) Athens, Greece
- Listed height: 6 ft 8.5 in (2.04 m)
- Listed weight: 245 lb (111 kg)

Career information
- Playing career: 1997–present

Career history
- 1997–1998: Panionios
- 1998–1999: Dafni
- 1999–2000: Papagou
- 2000–2002: Near East
- 2002–2003: Panellinios
- 2003–2004: Ionikos N.F.
- 2004–2006: Aris
- 2006–2007: Olympias Patras
- 2007–2012: Kolossos
- 2012–2014: Aris
- 2014–2019: Ippokratis Kos
- 2019–present: Anatolia
Medals
Men's basketball
Representing Greece
Mediterranean Games
Silver medal – second place	2001 Tunis	Under-26

Antonios Asimakopoulos (alternate spelling: Antonis; Greek: Αντώνης Ασημακόπουλος; born July 24, 1976) is a Greek professional basketball player. He is a 2.04 m (6 ft 8 1/2 in) tall power forward.

== Professional career ==
In his professional career, Asimakopoulos has played in the top Greek League with: Near East, Panellinios, Ionikos N.F., Aris, Olympias Patras, and Kolossos Rodou. In 2012, he returned to play with his former club Aris, after spending 5 seasons with Kolossos. In 2014, he signed with Ippokratis Kos.

== National team career ==
Asimakopoulos played with Greece's under-26 selection at the 2001 Mediterranean Games, where he won a silver medal.
