= Samuel S. Fels High School =

Coordinates: 40.0364°N 75.0925°W

Location
- 5500 Langdon Street; Philadelphia, Pennsylvania 19124; United States

Information
- Type: Public high school
- School district: The School District of Philadelphia
- Principal: Melissa Rasper
- Teaching staff: 83.40 (FTE)
- Grades: 9–12
- Enrollment: 1,235 (2023–2024)
- Student to teacher ratio: 14.81
- Website: Samuel S. Fels High School

The Samuel S. Fels High School (commonly referred to as Fels High School) is a district-run high school in Philadelphia. The school is named after Samuel Simeon Fels. It was founded in 1989 when the Samuel S. Fels Junior High School was restructured to have seventh through tenth grades, with the eleventh and twelfth grades to be added in 1990 and 1991. Melvin K. McMaster was the first principal of the high school. An $80 million building replaced the old facility in 2009.
