= Kostas Kaimakoglou =

Greek basketball player

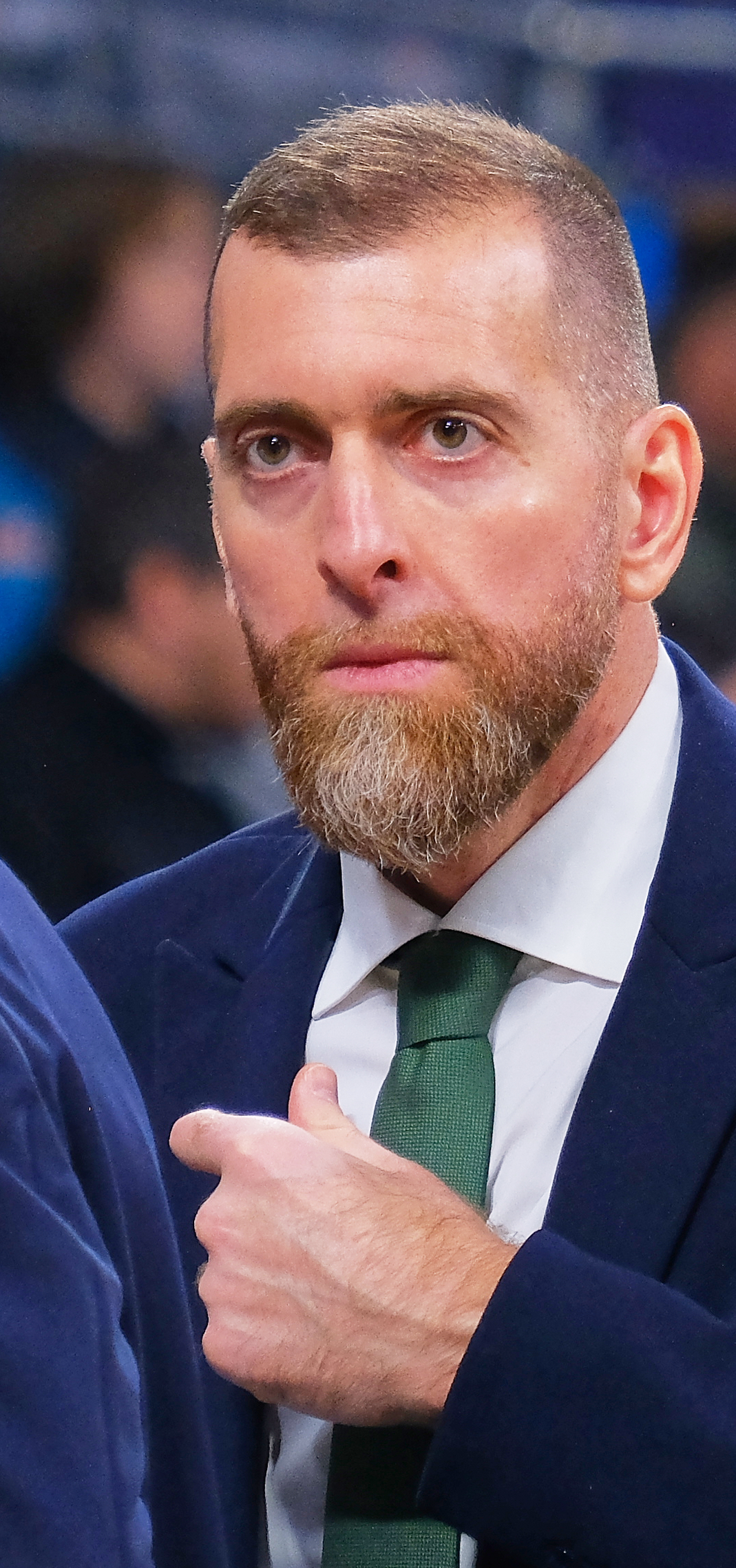
- Kaimakoglou celebrating Greece's win against Turkey (76–74), at EuroBasket 2009.

UNICS Kazan
- Title: Assistant coach
- League: VTB United League

Personal information
- Born: March 15, 1983 (age 43) Korydallos, Piraeus, Athens, Greece
- Listed height: 6 ft 9 in (2.06 m)
- Listed weight: 250 lb (113 kg)

Career information
- NBA draft: 2005: undrafted
- Playing career: 2002–2021
- Position: Power forward
- Number: 12, 15, 18, 21, 88
- Coaching career: 2021–present

Career history

Playing
- 2002–2004: Near East
- 2004–2010: Maroussi
- 2010–2012: Panathinaikos
- 2012–2021: UNICS Kazan

Coaching
- 2021–present: UNICS Kazan (assistant)

Career highlights
- EuroLeague champion (2011); All-Greek League Team (2010); Greek League Most Improved Player (2010); VTB United League Hall of Fame (2022)
Medals
Men's basketball
Representing Greece
EuroBasket
Bronze medal – third place	2009 Poland	{{{2}}}
FIBA Europe Under-20 Championship
Gold medal – first place	2002 Lithuania	Under-20

Konstantinos "Kostas" Kaimakoglou (Greek: Κωνσταντίνος "Κώστας" Καϊμακόγλου; born March 15, 1983) is a Greek former professional basketball player who last played for UNICS Kazan of the VTB United League and the EuroCup. He is 2.05 m (6 ft 9 in) tall, and his main position is power forward, but he can also play as a small ball center if needed.

== Professional career ==
Kaimakoglou began his professional career with the Greek League club Near East during the 2002–03 season. In 2004, he moved to the Greek club Maroussi. He was named to the Greek League Best Five in 2010. He joined the Greek club Panathinaikos in July 2010. With Panathinaikos, Kaimakoglou won the EuroLeague and Greek League championships in 2011. He also won the Greek Cup title with Panathinaikos in 2012.

In July 2012, he signed a two-year contract with the Russian VTB United League club UNICS Kazan, at an amount of €2.4 million net income. In July 2014, he extended his contract with UNICS for two more years. On June 12, 2016, he re-signed with UNICS for one more season. Kaimakoglu averaged 4.6 points, 3.3 rebounds and 1.5 assists per game during the 2019–20 season. He re-signed with the team on September 19, 2020. On September 10, 2021, Kaimakoglou announced his retirement from professional basketball.

== National team career ==
Kaimakoglou won the gold medal at the 2002 FIBA Europe Under-20 Championship as a member of the Greek Under-20 junior national team. He also played at the 2005 World University Games with Greece's junior national team. He also played with the senior men's Greek national team.

He won the bronze medal at the 2009 EuroBasket, and he also played with Greece at the 2010 FIBA World Championship, the 2011 EuroBasket, the 2012 FIBA World Olympic Qualifying Tournament, the 2013 EuroBasket, the 2014 FIBA World Cup, and the 2015 EuroBasket.

== Career statistics ==
Legend
GP	Games played	GS	Games started	MPG	Minutes per game
FG%	Field-goal percentage	3P%	3-point field-goal percentage	FT%	Free-throw percentage
RPG	Rebounds per game	APG	Assists per game	SPG	Steals per game
BPG	Blocks per game	PPG	Points per game	PIR	Performance index rating
**Bold**	Career high

=== EuroLeague ===
†	Denotes season in which Kaimakoglou won the EuroLeague champion
*	Led the league

Year	Team	GP	GS	MPG	FG%	3P%	FT%	RPG	APG	SPG	BPG	PPG	PIR
2009–10	Maroussi	15	12	24.0	**.471**	.326	.711	2.9	1.5	.5	.2	**9.6**	8.5
2010–11†	Panathinaikos	18	4	10.3	.371	.353	**.893**	2.4	.6	.6	.1	3.2	4.8
2011–12	Panathinaikos	**23***	5	22.6	.450	**.441**	.723	4.1	1.3	.9	.2	7.9	9.6
2014–15	UNICS	10	10	**30.9**	.411	.344	.667	**5.1**	**3.6**	**1.5**	**.3**	7.9	**11.4**
2016–17	UNICS	19	**17**	23.1	.388	.286	.786	3.4	1.5	.5	.2	4.7	4.6
Career		85	48	21.3	.430	.361	.753	3.5	1.5	.7	.2	6.5	7.5

== Awards and accomplishments ==
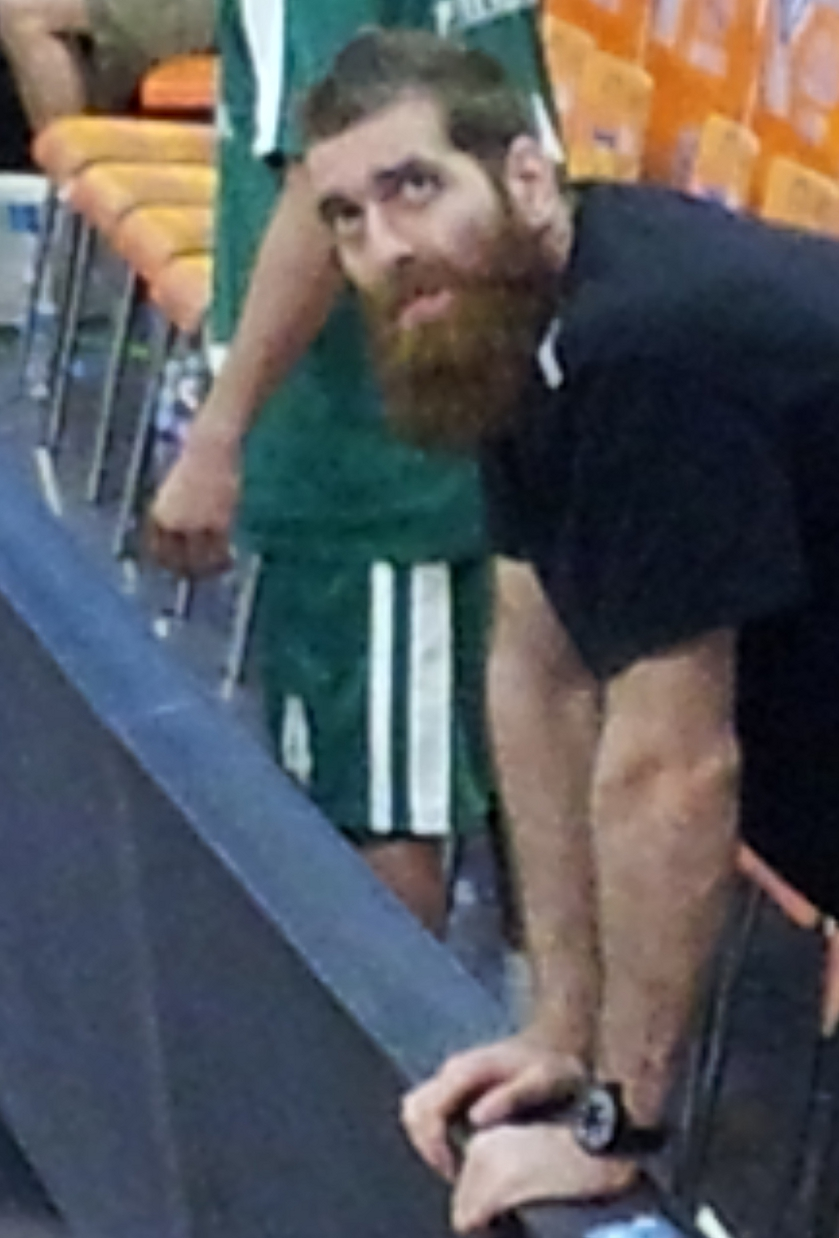
Kaimakoglou, on UNICS Kazan's bench, in the first game of the 2014 EuroCup Finals.

=== Pro career ===
- 2x Greek League All-Star: (2010, 2011)
- Greek League Best: (2010)
- EuroLeague Champion: (2011)
- Greek League Champion: (2011)
- Greek Cup Winner: (2012)
- Russian Cup Winner: (2014)

=== Greek senior national team ===
- 2002 FIBA Europe Under-20 Championship: Gold
- 2009 EuroBasket: Bronze
