= Kostas Charissis =

Greek professional basketball player

Personal information
- Born: November 12, 1979 (age 47) Athens, Greece
- Listed height: 6 ft 11.5 in (2.12 m)
- Listed weight: 275 lb (125 kg)

Career information
- High school: 1998 Bachiltzanaki (Piraeus, Greece)
- College: USC (1999–2003)
- NBA draft: 2003: undrafted
- Playing career: 1998–present
- Position: Center
- Number: 12, 13, 14, 15

Career history
- 1998–1999: Papagou
- 2003–2004: Olympiacos
- 2004–2005: Ilysiakos
- 2005–2007: Olympias Patras
- 2007–2008: AEK Athens
- 2008–2012: Kolossos Rodou
- 2012–2015: Aris
- 2015–present: Ippokratis Kos

Konstantinos "Kostas" Charissis (alternate spellings: Constantinos, Costas, Charisis, Harissis, Harisis) (Greek: Κωνσταντίνος "Κώστας" Χαρίσης; born November 12, 1979) is a Greek professional basketball player. He is a 2.12 m (6 ft 11 1/2 in) tall center.

== College career ==
Charissis played NCAA Division I college basketball at USC, with the USC Trojans, from 1999 to 2003.

== Professional career ==
Charissis started playing basketball in 1995, becoming a member of the junior team of Panellinios. In order to get more playing time, he moved to Psychiko, in 1996, where he stayed for two years, competing at the junior and the men's amateur levels. He continued his career by moving to Papagou, during the 1998–99 season, where he made his debut in the top-tier level Greek Basket League.

In 1999, Charissis moved to Los Angeles, to play NCAA Division I college basketball, at the USC. After playing 4 years of college basketball years with the USC Trojans, (1999–2003), he joined the Greek club Olympiacos Piraeus, for the 2003–04 season. The very next season, he moved to the Greek club Ilysiakos (Greek 2nd Division).

He then spent the next two seasons with Olympias Patras, the first in the Greek 2nd Division, where he won the league's championship, and the second season in the Greek First Division. Then, for the 2007–08 season, he joined AEK Athens, where he stayed only one year. For the next four seasons, he was a part of Kolossos Rodou, from 2008 to 2012. At the age of 33, he decided to move to Aris Thessaloniki in 2012, where he played for three seasons.

In 2015, he moved to Kos island and joined Ippokratis Kos.

== Awards and accomplishments ==
- 1999–00

USC Trojans "Best Newcomer" award

- 2000–01

Reached the NCAA Division I "Elite" 8

- 2001–02

2nd in Pac-10 Conference Tournament
Reached the NCAA Division I Top 64

- 2002–03

USC Trojans Co-captain
USC Trojans "110% Effort" award

- 2003–04

Reached Greek Cup Final

- 2005–06

Greek 2nd Division Champion
1st Blocks Greek 2nd Division
6th Rebounds Greek 2nd Division
7th 2ts % Greek 2nd Division

- 2006–07

1st Blocks Greek Basket League
7th Rebounds Greek Basket League

- 2008–09

Greek Basket League
3rd Blocks
Greek League All-Star

- 2009–10

Greek Basket League
2nd Blocks

- 2010–11

Greek Basket League
5th Blocks
11th Rebounds
Greek League All-Star

- 2011–12

Greek Basket League
11th Rebounds
11th Blocks

- 2012–13

Greek Basket League
11th Rebounds
8th Blocks

- 2013–14

Greek Basket League
11th Rebounds
10th Blocks
