= 2010–11 Greek Basket League =

2010–11 Greek Basket League season
- League: Greek Basket League
- Sport: Basketball
- Duration: 4 October 2010 – 8 June 2011
- Teams: 14
- TV partner(s): SKAI TV, ERT, Nova Sports

Regular Season
- Season champions: Olympiacos
- Season MVP: (Greece) Dimitris Diamantidis
- Top scorer: (Guyana) Rawle Marshall 448 Points (17.2 PPG)

Playoffs

Finals
- Champions: Panathinaikos
- Runners-up: Olympiacos
- Finals MVP: (Greece) Dimitris Diamantidis & (United States) Mike Batiste

Greek Basket League seasons
- ← 2009–10 2011–12 →

The 2010–11 Greek Basket League was the 71st season of the Greek Basket League, the highest tier professional basketball league in Greece. The 182-game regular season (26 games for each of the 14 teams) began on Saturday, October 4, 2010, and ended on Wednesday, April 20, 2011. The league's playoffs ended on June 8, 2011.

== Teams ==
Location of teams in Greek Basket League 2010–11

| Club | Home city |
|---|---|
| AEK Athens | Athens |
| Aris | Thessaloniki |
| Ikaros Kallitheas | Kallithea, Athens |
| Ilysiakos | Ilisia, Athens |
| Iraklis | Thessaloniki |
| Kavala | Kavala |
| Kolossos Rodou | Rhodes |
| Maroussi | Maroussi, Athens |
| Olympiacos | Piraeus |
| Panathinaikos | Athens |
| Panellinios | Lamia (temporarily) |
| Panionios | Nea Smyrni, Athens |
| PAOK | Thessaloniki |
| Peristeri | Peristeri, Athens |

== Regular season ==
=== Standings ===
| Pos | Team | Total | | | | | | | Home | | Away | |
|---|---|---|---|---|---|---|---|---|---|---|---|---|
| | | Pts | Pld | W | L | F | A | D | W | L | W | L |
| 1. | Olympiacos | 52 | 26 | 26 | 0 | 2221 | 1699 | +552 | 13 | 0 | 13 | 0 |
| 2. | Panathinaikos | 50 | 26 | 24 | 2 | 2368 | 1658 | +710 | 12 | 1 | 12 | 1 |
| 3. | PAOK | 42 | 26 | 16 | 10 | 1900 | 1846 | +54 | 10 | 3 | 6 | 7 |
| 4. | Aris | 40 | 26 | 14 | 12 | 2006 | 2001 | +5 | 9 | 4 | 5 | 8 |
| 5. | Maroussi | 39 | 26 | 13 | 13 | 1871 | 2035 | −164 | 9 | 4 | 4 | 9 |
| 6. | Kavala | 38 | 26 | 12 | 14 | 1889 | 1986 | −97 | 9 | 4 | 3 | 10 |
| 7. | Peristeri | 38 | 26 | 12 | 14 | 1755 | 1813 | −58 | 9 | 4 | 3 | 10 |
| 8. | Kolossos Rodou | 38 | 26 | 12 | 14 | 1798 | 1834 | −36 | 8 | 5 | 4 | 9 |
| 9. | Panionios | 38 | 26 | 12 | 14 | 1866 | 1947 | −81 | 7 | 6 | 5 | 8 |
| 10. | Ikaros Kallitheas | 36 | 26 | 10 | 16 | 1807 | 2013 | −206 | 8 | 5 | 2 | 11 |
| 11. | Ilysiakos | 35 | 26 | 9 | 17 | 1882 | 1934 | −52 | 7 | 6 | 2 | 11 |
| 12. | Panellinios | 35 | 26 | 9 | 17 | 1822 | 1976 | −154 | 6 | 7 | 3 | 9 |
| 13. | AEK Athens | 34 | 26 | 8 | 18 | 1888 | 2035 | −147 | 6 | 7 | 2 | 11 |
| 14. | Iraklis | 31 | 26 | 5 | 21 | 1737 | 2063 | −326 | 4 | 9 | 1 | 12 |

Pts=Points, Pld=Matches played, W=Matches won, L=Matches lost, F=Points for, A=Points against, D=Points difference

| Qualification to League Playoffs |
| Relegation to HEBA A2 2011−12 |

== Playoffs ==
Teams in italics had home advantage. Teams in bold won the playoff series. Numbers to the left of each team indicate the team's original playoff seeding. Numbers to the right indicate the score of each playoff game.

Quarterfinals
1 | **Olympiacos** | **90** | **83**
8 | Kolossos Rodou | 55 | 67
4 | **Aris** | 72 | **62** | **69**
5 | Maroussi | **86** | 51 | 45
2 | **Panathinaikos** | **88** | **74**
7 | Peristeri | 60 | 72
3 | **PAOK** | **65** | **64**
6 | Kavala | 61 | 62

Semifinals
1 | **Olympiacos** | **95** | **102** | **87**
4 | Aris | 63 | 76 | 64
2 | **Panathinaikos** | **95** | **75** | **105**
3 | PAOK | 52 | 69 | 65

Finals
1 | Olympiacos | 70 | 66 | **76** | 94 | -
2 | **Panathinaikos** | **75** | **78** | 68 | **101** | -
Euroleague Qualification Rounds Match
3 | **PAOK** | **76** | 70 | 59 | **91** | **63**
4 | Aris | 74 | **73** | **67** | 80 | 56

== Final league standings ==
| Position | Team | Overall Record | | |
|---|---|---|---|---|
| | | **Games** | **Wins** | **Losses** |
| 1. | Panathinaikos | 35 | 32 | 3 |
| 2. | Olympiacos | 35 | 32 | 3 |
| 3. | PAOK | 36 | 21 | 15 |
| 4. | Aris | 37 | 18 | 19 |
| 5. | Maroussi | 29 | 14 | 15 |
| 6. | Kavala | 28 | 12 | 16 |
| 7. | Peristeri | 28 | 12 | 16 |
| 8. | Kolossos Rodou | 28 | 12 | 16 |
| 9. | Panionios | 26 | 12 | 14 |
| 10. | Ikaros Kallitheas | 26 | 10 | 16 |
| 11. | Ilysiakos | 26 | 9 | 17 |
| 12. | Panellinios | 26 | 9 | 17 |
| 13. | AEK Athens | 26 | 8 | 18 |
| 14. | Iraklis | 26 | 5 | 21 |

| Euroleague 2011−12 Regular Season |
| Euroleague 2011−12 Qualification Rounds |
| Eurocup 2011−12 Regular Season |
| Relegation to HEBA A2 2011−12 |

- Maroussi forfeited its place in the Eurocup 2011−12 Regular Season.

Greek Basket League 2010−11
Champions
**Panathinaikos**
**32nd Title**

== Awards ==
=== Greek League MVP ===
- (Greece) Dimitris Diamantidis – Panathinaikos

=== Greek League Finals MVP ===
- (Greece) Dimitris Diamantidis &
- (United States) Mike Batiste – Panathinaikos

=== All-Greek League Team ===
- (Greece) Dimitris Diamantidis – Panathinaikos
- (Greece) Vassilis Spanoulis – Olympiacos
- (Guyana) Rawle Marshall – PAOK
- (United States) Mike Batiste – Panathinaikos
- (Greece) Ioannis Bourousis – Olympiacos

=== Best Coach ===
- (Serbia) Željko Obradović – Panathinaikos

=== Defensive Player of the Year ===
- (Greece) Dimitris Diamantidis – Panathinaikos

=== Best Young Player ===
- (Greece) Kostas Sloukas – Aris

=== Most Improved Player ===
- (Greece) Nick Calathes – Panathinaikos

== Statistical leaders ==
Greek Basket League stats leaders are counted by totals, rather than averages, and include both regular season.

=== Points ===
| Pos. | Player | Club | Total points |
|---|---|---|---|
| **1.** | (Guyana) **Rawle Marshall** | PAOK | **448** |
| 2. | (Greece) Pat Calathes | Kolossos Rodou | 387 |
| 3. | (United States) Milt Palacio | Kavala | 377 |
| 4. | (United States) Deon Thompson | Ikaros Kallitheas | 352 |
| 5. | (United States) Jimmy Baxter | Ilysiakos | 350 |

=== Rebounds ===
| Pos | Player | Club | Total Rebounds |
|---|---|---|---|
| **1.** | (United States) **Cedric Simmons** | Kavala | **256** |
| 2. | (United States) Deon Thompson | Ikaros Kallitheas | 219 |
| 3. | (Greece) Pat Calathes | Kolossos Rodou | 218 |
| 4. | (United States) Kert Liouby | Peristeri | 185 |
| 5. | (Croatia) Dalibor Bagarić | Maroussi | 168 |

=== Assists ===
| Pos. | Player | Club | Total Assists |
|---|---|---|---|
| **1.** | (United States) **Jared Jordan** | Kolossos Rodou | **143** |
| 2. | (Greece) Vassilis Spanoulis | Olympiacos | 127 |
| 3. | (Greece) Dimitris Diamantidis | Panathinaikos | 116 |
| 4. | (Serbia) Miloš Teodosić | Olympiacos | 103 |
| 5. | (Greece) Sakis Karidas | Ilysiakos | 99 |

=== Steals ===
| Pos. | Player | Club | Total Steals |
|---|---|---|---|
| **1.** | (Greece) **Sakis Karidas** | Ilysiakos | **45** |
| 2. | (Guyana) Rawle Marshall | PAOK | 43 |
| 3. | (Greece) Vassilis Xanthopoulos | Panellinios | 42 |
| 4. | (United States) Jimmy Baxter | Ilysiakos | 40 |
| 5. | (Serbia) Vladimir Petrović-Stergiou | Iraklis | 37 |

=== Blocks ===
| Pos | Player | Club | Total Blocks |
|---|---|---|---|
| **1.** | (United States) **Cedric Simmons** | Kavala | **50** |
| 2. | (Croatia) Dalibor Bagarić | Maroussi | 37 |
| 3. | (United States) Kert Liouby | Peristeri | 32 |
| 4. | (United States) Deon Thompson | Ikaros Kallitheas | 32 |
| 5. | (Greece) Kostas Charissis | Kolossos Rodou | 21 |

== Clubs in international competitions ==
| Team | Competition | Result |
|---|---|---|
| Panathinaikos | EuroLeague | Final-4, 1st place |
| Olympiacos | EuroLeague | Playoffs, Quarterfinals |
| Maroussi | EuroLeague | Qualifying rounds, Bracket B, First qualifying round (disqualified) |
| Panellinios | EuroCup | Top 16, 3rd place |
| Aris | EuroCup | Top 16, 4th place |
| PAOK | EuroCup | Regular season, 3rd place |
