= 2021 EuroLeague Final Four =

Basketball tournament in Cologne

- Season: 2020–21 EuroLeague

Tournament details
- Arena: Lanxess Arena; Cologne, Germany
- Dates: 28–30 May 2021

Final positions
- Champions: (Turkey) Anadolu Efes (1st title)
- Runners-up: (Spain) Barcelona
- Third place: (Italy) A|X Armani Exchange Milan
- Fourth place: (Russia) CSKA Moscow

Awards and statistics
- MVP: (Serbia) Vasilije Micić
- Top scorer(s): (Serbia) Vasilije Micić (50 points)

The 2021 EuroLeague Final Four was the concluding EuroLeague Final Four tournament of the 2020–21 EuroLeague season, the 64th season of Europe's premier club basketball tournament, and the 21st season since it was first organised by Euroleague Basketball. It was the 34th Final Four of the modern EuroLeague Final Four era (1988–present), and the 36th time overall that the competition has concluded with a final four format. The Final Four was played at the Lanxess Arena in Cologne, Germany, on 28–30 May 2021. The Final Four was played behind closed doors as a consequence of the COVID-19 pandemic and the corresponding measures taken by German authorities.

This is notable as the last appearance of CSKA Moscow, a perpetual Final Four contender that made 30 Final Fours, including 17 appearances in 19 seasons between 2001 and 2021; Russian sports teams have been banned from playing in international competitions due to the escalation of the Russo-Ukrainian war.

== Venue ==
On 7 September 2020, Euroleague Basketball announced that the Final Four was going to be held at the Lanxess Arena in Cologne, Germany, on 19–21 May 2021.

Cologne	2021 EuroLeague Final Four (Europe)
Lanxess Arena	2021 EuroLeague Final Four (Europe)
Capacity: 19,500	2021 EuroLeague Final Four (Europe)

== Teams ==
Team	Qualified date	Participations (bold indicates winners)
(Spanish Basketball Federation) Barcelona	4 May 2021	14 (1989, 1990, 1991, 1994, 1996, 1997, 2000, **2003**, 2006, 2009, **2010**, 2012, 2013, 2014)
(Italian Basketball Federation) A|X Armani Exchange Milan	4 May 2021	4 (**1966**, 1967, **1988**, 1992)
(Russian Basketball Federation) CSKA Moscow	28 April 2021	19 (1966, 1996, 2001, 2003, 2004, 2005, **2006**, 2007, **2008**, 2009, 2010, 2012, 2013, 2014, 2015, **2016**, 2017, 2018, **2019**)
(Turkish Basketball Federation) Anadolu Efes	4 May 2021	3 (2000, 2001, 2019)

== Bracket ==
Semifinals
28 May
**(Spain) Barcelona**	**84**
(Italy) A|X Armani Exchange Milan	82
28 May
(Russia) CSKA Moscow	86
**(Turkey) Anadolu Efes**	**89**

Championship game
30 May
(Spain) Barcelona	81
**(Turkey) Anadolu Efes**	**86**
Third place game
30 May
**(Italy) A|X Armani Exchange Milan**	**83**
(Russia) CSKA Moscow	73

== Semifinals ==
=== Semifinal A ===
28 May 2021	**Barcelona** (Spain)	**84**–82	(Italy) A|X Armani Exchange Milan	Cologne, Germany
21:00 (CEST)	Scoring by quarter: **27**–24, **24**–18, 16–**29**, **17**–11
	Pts: Mirotić 21; Rebs: Mirotić 6 Asts: Calathes 6 PIR: Mirotić 28	Boxscore	Pts: Punter 23; Rebs: Delaney 4 Asts: Delaney 7 PIR: Punter 21	Arena: Lanxess Arena; Attendance: 0 Referees: (Croatia) Sreten Radović, (Slovenia) Matej Boltauzer, (Latvia) Oļegs Latiševs

Starters:			Pts	Reb	Ast
PG	99	(Greece) Nick Calathes	17	4	6
SG	22	(United States) Cory Higgins	11	2	1
SF	21	(Spain) Álex Abrines	6	4	0
PF	33	(Spain) Nikola Mirotić	21	6	0
C	0	(Uganda) Brandon Davies	2	2	2
Reserves:					
SF	8	(Hungary) Ádám Hanga	2	0	0
SG	9	(Argentina) Leandro Bolmaro	4	1	3
PF	10	(Latvia) Rolands Šmits	3	4	0
C	16	(Spain) Pau Gasol	10	3	1
PF	18	(Spain) Pierre Oriola	0	0	0
SG	24	(Slovakia) Kyle Kuric	8	1	1
SF	30	(Spain) Víctor Claver	0	1	0
Head coach:
(Lithuanian Basketball Federation) Šarūnas Jasikevičius

**Barcelona**	**Armani Milan**

Barcelona	Statistics	A. Milan
19/36 (52.8%)	2-pt field goals	16/40 (40%)
8/20 (40%)	3-pt field goals	11/23 (47.8%)
22/28 (78.6%)	Free throws	17/19 (89.5%)
13	Offensive rebounds	18
17	Defensive rebounds	18
30	Total rebounds	36
14	Assists	11
13	Turnovers	17
8	Steals	8
6	Blocks	0
22	Fouls	22

Starters:			Pts	Reb	Ast
PG	23	(United States) Malcolm Delaney	9	7	4
SG	31	(Denmark) Shavon Shields	13	5	1
SF	5	(Serbia) Vladimir Micov	14	1	1
PF	2	(United States) Zach LeDay	8	3	1
C	42	(United States) Kyle Hines	4	5	2
Reserves:					
SG	0	(United States) Kevin Punter	23	2	0
SG	10	(Tunisia) Michael Roll	0	0	0
PG	13	(Spain) Sergio Rodríguez	11	1	2
PF	15	(United States) Kaleb Tarczewski	0	4	0
PF	32	(Italy) Jeff Brooks	0	0	0
F/C	40	(United States) Jeremy Evans	0	1	0
PF	70	(Italy) Luigi Datome	0	0	0
Head coach:
(Italian Basketball Federation) Ettore Messina

=== Semifinal B ===
28 May 2021	CSKA Moscow (Russia)	86–**89**	(Turkey) **Anadolu Efes**	Cologne, Germany
18:00 (CEST)	Scoring by quarter: 15–**25**, 22–**24**, 18–**22**, **31**–18
	Pts: Clyburn 26; Rebs: Shengelia, Clyburn 7 Asts: Hackett, Voigtmann 2 PIR: Clyburn 34	Boxscore	Pts: Micić 25; Rebs: Şanlı 8 Asts: Micić 6 PIR: Micić 26	Arena: Lanxess Arena; Attendance: 0 Referees: (Slovenia) Saša Pukl, (Spain) Juan Carlos García, (Lithuania) Gytis Vilius

Starters:			Pts	Reb	Ast
PG	10	(Italy) Daniel Hackett	17	3	2
SG	6	(United States) Darrun Hilliard	0	1	1
SF	41	(Russia) Nikita Kurbanov	2	2	0
PF	23	(Georgia (country)) Tornike Shengelia	10	7	0
C	50	(Nigeria) Micheal Eric	0	0	0
Reserves:					
G	1	(Denmark) Gabriel Lundberg	15	0	1
PF	3	(Russia) Joel Bolomboy	DNP		
SG	7	(Russia) Ivan Ukhov	8	1	1
F	11	(Russia) Semyon Antonov	0	0	0
G	13	(Latvia) Jānis Strēlnieks	2	0	0
C	17	(Germany) Johannes Voigtmann	6	4	2
SF	21	(United States) Will Clyburn	26	7	1
Head coach:
(Hellenic Basketball Federation) Dimitrios Itoudis

**CSKA Moscow**	**Anadolu Efes**

CSKA	Statistics	A. Efes
25/35 (71.4%)	2-pt field goals	21/35 (60%)
7/25 (28%)	3-pt field goals	8/20 (40%)
15/19 (79.9%)	Free throws	23/27 (85.2%)
8	Offensive rebounds	6
20	Defensive rebounds	23
28	Total rebounds	29
8	Assists	12
11	Turnovers	12
5	Steals	2
3	Blocks	6
26	Fouls	24

Starters:			Pts	Reb	Ast
PG	22	(Serbia) Vasilije Micić	25	3	6
SG	1	(France) Rodrigue Beaubois	15	1	1
SF	44	(Croatia) Krunoslav Simon	10	6	3
PF	2	(United States) Chris Singleton	1	3	1
C	15	(Turkey) Sertaç Şanlı	19	8	0
Reserves:					
PG	0	(Turkey) Shane Larkin	11	1	1
PG	4	(Turkey) Doğuş Balbay	0	0	0
PF	18	(France) Adrien Moerman	6	1	0
G	19	(Turkey) Buğrahan Tuncer	DNP		
C	21	(Germany) Tibor Pleiß	DNP		
SF	23	(United States) James Anderson	2	1	0
C	42	(Armenia) Bryant Dunston	0	1	0
Head coach:
(Turkish Basketball Federation) Ergin Ataman

== Third place game ==
30 May 2021	**A|X Armani Exchange Milan** (Italy)	**83**–73	(Russia) CSKA Moscow	Cologne, Germany
17:30 (CEST)	Scoring by quarter: 20–**23**, **20**–11, 20–**23**, **23**–16
	Pts: Micov, Rodríguez 14; Rebs: Shields 7 Asts: Rodríguez 6 PIR: Rodríguez 16	Boxscore	Pts: Shengelia 18; Rebs: Shengelia 9 Asts: Shengelia, Ukhov 3 PIR: Shengelia 26	Arena: Lanxess Arena; Attendance: 0 Referees: (Spain) Juan Carlos García, (France) Mehdi Difallah, (Serbia) Uroš Nikolić

Starters:			Pts	Reb	Ast
PG	10	(Tunisia) Michael Roll	11	3	1
SG	31	(Denmark) Shavon Shields	11	7	0
SF	5	(Serbia) Vladimir Micov	14	2	1
PF	2	(United States) Zach LeDay	7	3	1
C	15	(United States) Kaleb Tarczewski	7	2	1
Reserves:					
SG	0	(United States) Kevin Punter	2	1	0
G/F	9	(Italy) Riccardo Moraschini	11	3	1
PG	13	(Spain) Sergio Rodríguez	14	3	6
PG	20	(Italy) Andrea Cinciarini	0	0	0
PF	32	(Italy) Jeff Brooks	0	0	0
F/C	40	(United States) Jeremy Evans	1	3	0
C	42	(United States) Kyle Hines	5	5	4
Head coach:
(Italian Basketball Federation) Ettore Messina

**Armani Milan**	**CSKA Moscow**

A. Milan	Statistics	CSKA
18/32 (56.3%)	2-pt field goals	19/37 (51.4%)
11/22 (50.0%)	3-pt field goals	6/26 (23.1%)
14/20 (70.0%)	Free throws	17/20 (85.0%)
4	Offensive rebounds	7
28	Defensive rebounds	24
32	Total rebounds	31
15	Assists	11
14	Turnovers	9
6	Steals	11
0	Blocks	7
25	Fouls	22

Starters:			Pts	Reb	Ast
PG	1	(Denmark) Gabriel Lundberg	13	4	2
SG	7	(Russia) Ivan Ukhov	2	0	3
SF	41	(Russia) Nikita Kurbanov	8	4	1
PF	23	(Georgia (country)) Tornike Shengelia	18	9	3
C	3	(Russia) Joel Bolomboy	8	1	0
Reserves:					
PG	4	(Russia) Alexander Khomenko	3	0	1
SG	6	(United States) Darrun Hilliard	9	2	1
F	11	(Russia) Semyon Antonov	0	2	0
G	13	(Latvia) Jānis Strēlnieks	0	1	0
C	17	(Germany) Johannes Voigtmann	12	6	0
SF	21	(United States) Will Clyburn	0	1	0
C	50	(Nigeria) Micheal Eric	0	1	0
Head coach:
(Hellenic Basketball Federation) Dimitrios Itoudis

== Championship game ==
30 May 2021	Barcelona (Spain)	81–**86**	(Turkey) **Anadolu Efes**	Cologne, Germany
20:30 (CEST)	Scoring by quarter: **22**–15, 14–**24**, 22–**26**, **23**–21
	Pts: Higgins 23; Rebs: Davies 11; Asts: Bolmaro 3 PIR: Higgins 23	Boxscore	Pts: Micić 25; Rebs: Moerman 8 Asts: Micić 5 PIR: Micić, Larkin 28	Arena: Lanxess Arena; Attendance: 0 Referees: (Slovenia) Saša Pukl, (Latvia) Oļegs Latiševs, (Lithuania) Gytis Vilius

Starters:			Pts	Reb	Ast
PG	99	(Greece) Nick Calathes	0	2	1
SG	22	(United States) Cory Higgins	23	2	1
SF	30	(Spain) Víctor Claver	2	1	0
PF	33	(Spain) Nikola Mirotić	11	9	0
C	0	(Uganda) Brandon Davies	17	11	2
Reserves:					
SF	8	(Hungary) Ádám Hanga	0	0	0
SG	9	(Argentina) Leandro Bolmaro	7	5	3
PF	10	(Latvia) Rolands Šmits	0	0	1
C	16	(Spain) Pau Gasol	1	3	0
PF	18	(Spain) Pierre Oriola	0	0	0
SF	21	(Spain) Álex Abrines	2	4	0
SG	24	(Slovakia) Kyle Kuric	18	1	2
Head coach:
(Lithuanian Basketball Federation) Šarūnas Jasikevičius

**Barcelona**	**Anadolu Efes**

Barcelona	Statistics	A. Efes
17/37 (46%)	2-pt field goals	22/39 (56.4%)
8/30 (26.7%)	3-pt field goals	4/18 (22.2%)
23/29 (79.3%)	Free throws	30/35 (85.7%)
17	Offensive rebounds	7
21	Defensive rebounds	23
38	Total rebounds	30
10	Assists	12
14	Turnovers	10
5	Steals	8
3	Blocks	2
30	Fouls	25

2020–21 EuroLeague champions

**Anadolu Efes**
(1st title)

Starters:			Pts	Reb	Ast
PG	22	(Serbia) Vasilije Micić	25	3	5
SG	0	(Turkey) Shane Larkin	21	2	3
SF	44	(Croatia) Krunoslav Simon	4	3	2
PF	2	(United States) Chris Singleton	4	3	0
C	15	(Turkey) Sertaç Şanlı	12	2	0
Reserves:					
SG	1	(France) Rodrigue Beaubois	3	1	0
PG	4	(Turkey) Doğuş Balbay	0	0	0
PF	18	(France) Adrien Moerman	6	8	1
G	19	(Turkey) Buğrahan Tuncer	0	0	0
C	21	(Germany) Tibor Pleiß	5	3	0
SF	23	(United States) James Anderson	0	2	0
C	42	(Armenia) Bryant Dunston	6	3	1
Head coach:
(Turkish Basketball Federation) Ergin Ataman

- Team captains (C): (Spain) Pierre Oriola (Barcelona) and (Turkey) Doğuş Balbay (Anadolu Efes)
