= Ettore Messina =

Italian basketball coach (born 1959)

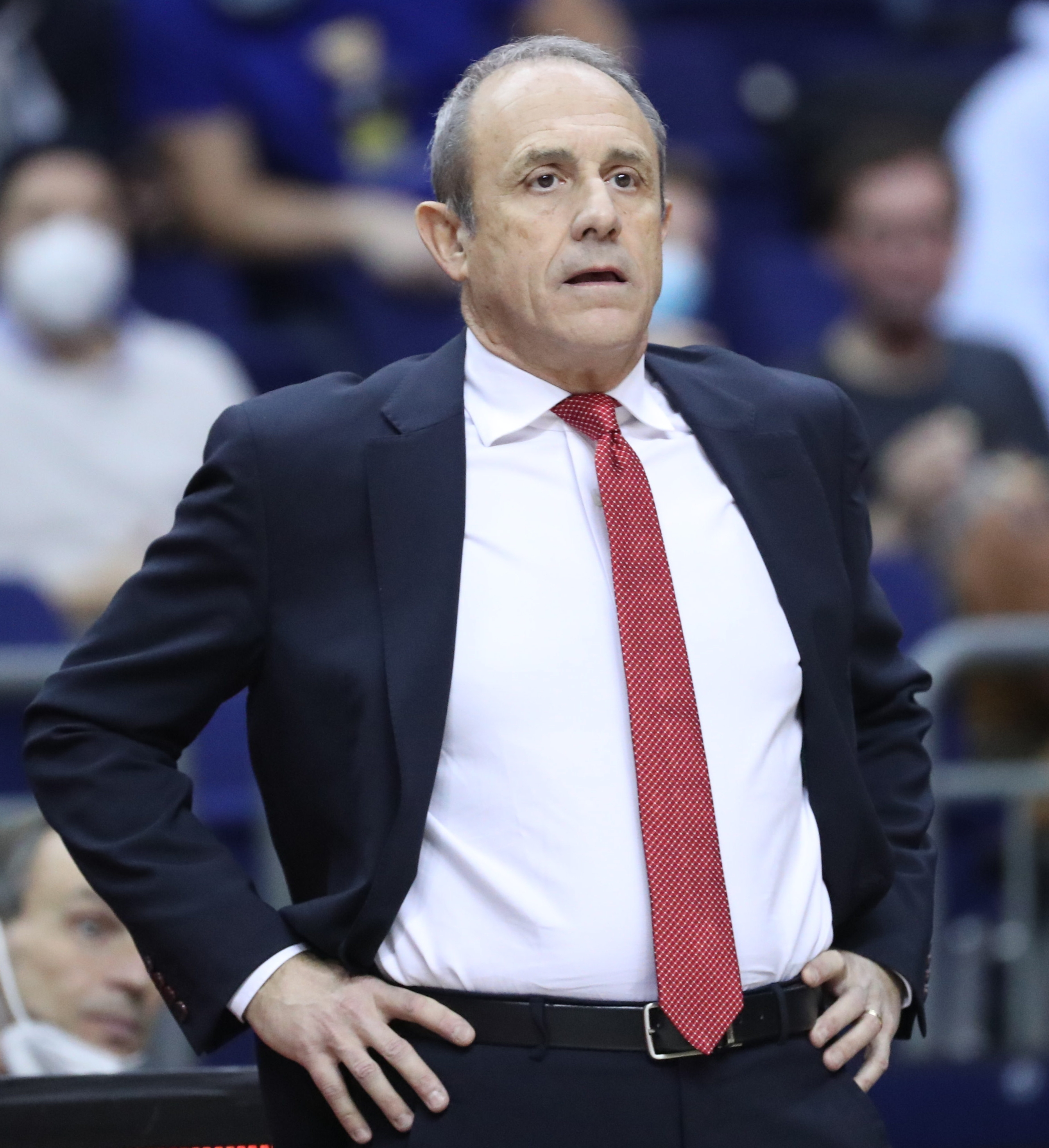
- Messina in 2021

Atlanta Hawks
- Position: Assistant coach

Personal information
- Born: 30 September 1959 (age 67) Catania, Sicily, Italy
- Coaching career: 1976–present

Career history

Coaching
- 1976–1980: Reyer Venezia (youth)
- 1980–1982: Basket Mestre (youth)
- 1982–1983: A.P.U. Udine (assistant)
- 1983–1989: Virtus Bologna (assistant)
- 1989–1993: Virtus Bologna
- 1992–1997: Italy
- 1997–2002: Virtus Bologna
- 2002–2005: Benetton Treviso
- 2005–2009: CSKA Moscow
- 2009–2011: Real Madrid
- 2011–2012: Los Angeles Lakers (consultant)
- 2012–2014: CSKA Moscow
- 2014–2019: San Antonio Spurs (assistant)
- 2015–2017: Italy
- 2019–2025: Olimpia Milano

Career highlights
- As head coach: 4× EuroLeague champion (1998, 2001, 2006, 2008); FIBA Saporta Cup champion (1990); 3× VTB United League champion (2008, 2013, 2014); 6× Russian League champion (2006–2009, 2013–2014); 7× Lega Serie A champion (1993, 1998, 2002, 2003, 2022–2024); 4× Russian Cup winner (2005–2008); 9× Italian Cup winner (1990, 1999, 2001–2005, 2021, 2022); 4× Italian Supercup winner (2002, 2020, 2024, 2025); 3× Gomelsky Cup winner (2012–2014); 50 Greatest EuroLeague Contributors (2008); FIBA EuroStar (1998); European Coach of the Year (1998); 2× EuroLeague Coach of the Year (2006, 2008); VTB United League Hall of Fame (2019); 4× Russian League Coach of the Year (2006–2009); 3× Lega Serie A Coach of the Year (1998, 2001, 2005); Lega Serie A Hall of Fame (2008); 2× Italian Coach of the Year (1990, 1993); As assistant coach: NBA All-Star Game (2016); Lega Serie A champion (1984); 2× Italian Cup champion (1984, 1989)
- FIBA Hall of Fame
Medals
Men's basketball
Head coach for Italy
EuroBasket
Silver medal – second place	1997 Spain
Mediterranean Games
Gold medal – first place	1993 France

Ettore Messina (born 30 September 1959) is an Italian professional basketball coach who last coached Olimpia Milano of the Italian Lega Basket Serie A (LBA). He has won four EuroLeague championships as a head coach. Messina is regarded as one of the best European basketball coaches of all time, having been named one of the 50 Greatest EuroLeague Contributors in 2008.

He was named the Italian League's Best Coach three times, in the years 1998, 2001, and 2005. Furthermore, he has been named EuroLeague's Coach of the Year twice, in 2006 and 2008. He was inducted into the Italian Basketball Hall of Fame in 2008 and into the Russian VTB United League Hall of Fame in 2019. Messina also previously worked with the San Antonio Spurs as an assistant coach for Gregg Popovich from 2014 to 2019.

== Club coaching career ==
=== Virtus Bologna ===
Messina had two different stints (1989–1993 and 1997–2002) as the head coach at the Italian League team, Virtus Bologna. In the 1989–90 season, he won the Italian Cup and also the second-tier level European-wide league, the FIBA Cup Winners' Cup, against Real Madrid, in Florence. He also won the Italian League national championship in 1993. During his second stint at Virtus, he coached the team to win the first-tier level European-wide EuroLeague championship, in both 1997–98 and 2000–01. He also added two Italian League championships to his trophy case in 1998 and 2001, as well as three Italian Cup titles in 1999, 2001, and 2002.

=== Benetton Treviso ===
Messina then served as the head coach of the Italian League club Benetton Treviso, where he succeeded Mike D'Antoni as head coach in 2002. He stayed there for 3 seasons. With Treviso, he won the Italian League championship in 2003, and also the Italian Cup title thrice, adding them to a total streak of 5 consecutive titles, with two different clubs.

=== CSKA Moscow ===
Messina then joined the Russian club CSKA Moscow in 2005, and led the team to the EuroLeague's 2005–06 title and the coveted Triple Crown in his first season there. On 4 May 2008, CSKA won the EuroLeague championship again under Messina - the club gained its sixth EuroLeague title by downing Maccabi Tel Aviv at the 2007–08 Madrid edition of the EuroLeague Final Four. He resigned from CSKA immediately after leading them to a Russian Championship and the EuroLeague Final, during the 2008–09 season. He was offered a position as the technical director at CSKA, but at the time of his resignation, he had not decided whether or not he wanted to stay with the club.

=== Real Madrid ===
Messina was announced as the new head coach of the Spanish League club Real Madrid, on 18 June 2009, and signed his contract with the club the following day. After Real Madrid had several poor performances, Messina resigned from the club's head coach position in March 2011.

=== Los Angeles Lakers ===
Messina was frequently the subject of speculation linking him with vacant coaching jobs in the NBA. For example, he was one of the many coaches in the discussion for the Sacramento Kings head coaching role, and it was also rumoured that he would join the Toronto Raptors and San Antonio Spurs coaching staffs. Messina eventually agreed to join the Los Angeles Lakers, as part of head coach Mike Brown's coaching staff, as a full-time consultant to the head coach, for the 2011–12 season.

=== Return to CSKA Moscow ===
In June 2012, Messina decided to leave his job as a consultant for the Los Angeles Lakers, and he returned to CSKA Moscow, to become the team's head coach. In June 2014, he parted ways with CSKA Moscow.

=== San Antonio Spurs ===
On 15 July 2014, Messina was hired by the San Antonio Spurs as an assistant coach. On 16 October 2014, Messina would coach the Spurs in a 121–90 preseason win against the Phoenix Suns, due to Gregg Popovich being unable to travel with the team at the time.

Messina would later take on the role of the World Team's head coach in the 2016 NBA Rising Stars Challenge. On 7–8 March 2016, Messina again served as head coach of the Spurs for two games, due to Gregg Popovich leaving the team for a family emergency. On 19 April 2018, Messina temporarily took over head coaching duties of the team in their playoff series versus the Golden State Warriors, due to Popovich having left the team in light of his wife's death the previous night.

=== Olimpia Milano ===
On 11 June 2019, Messina signed a three-year contract, and agreed to become the new head coach and President of Basketball Operations of the Italian club Olimpia Milano.

=== Atlanta Hawks ===
On 13 September 2026, the Atlanta Hawks hired Messina as a consultant.

== National team coaching career ==
From 1993 to 1997, Messina was the head coach of the senior men's Italian national basketball team. He coached Italy at the 1993 EuroBasket and the 1995 EuroBasket, and he also led Italy to the silver medal at the 1997 EuroBasket.

In 2016, Messina took a short leave of absence from the San Antonio Spurs in order to return as the head coach of the Azzurri, with the goal of qualifying for the 2016 Rio Summer Olympic Games. Messina coached Italy at the 2016 Turin FIBA World Olympic Qualifying Tournament. At the qualification tournament, Italy lost to Croatia, and thus failed to qualify to the 2016 Summer Olympics. He also coached Italy at the 2017 EuroBasket.

== Coaching record ==
Legend
G	Games coached	W	Games won	L	Games lost	W–L %	Win-loss %

Note: The EuroLeague is not the only competition in which the team played during the season. He also coached in domestic competition, and regional competition if applicable.

Team	Year	G	W	L	W–L%	Result
Virtus Bologna	1991–92	19	13	6	.684	Lost in Quarterfinal Playoffs
Virtus Bologna	1992–93	16	8	8	.500	Lost in Quarterfinal Playoffs
Virtus Bologna	1997–98	22	19	3	.864	Won EuroLeague Championship
Virtus Bologna	1998–99	23	15	8	.652	Lost in EuroLeague Finals
Virtus Bologna	2000–01	23	20	3	.870	Won EuroLeague Championship
Virtus Bologna	2001–02	22	17	5	.773	Lost in EuroLeague Finals
Treviso	2002–03	22	18	4	.818	Lost in EuroLeague Finals
Treviso	2003–04	20	14	6	.700	Eliminated at Top 16 Stage
Treviso	2004–05	22	12	10	.545	Lost in Quarterfinal Playoffs
CSKA Moscow
CSKA Moscow	2005–06	24	19	5	.792	Won EuroLeague Championship
CSKA Moscow	2006–07	25	22	3	.880	Lost in EuroLeague Finals
CSKA Moscow	2007–08	25	20	5	.800	Won Euroleague Championship
CSKA Moscow	2008–09	21	16	5	.762	Lost in EuroLeague Finals
Real Madrid	2009–10	20	12	8	.600	Lost in Quarterfinal Playoffs
Real Madrid	2010–11	16	11	5	.688	(resigned)
CSKA Moscow	2012–13	26	21	5	.808	Lost in EuroLeague Semifinals
CSKA Moscow	2013–14	31	22	9	.710	Lost in EuroLeague Semifinals
AX Armani Exchange Milan	2019-20	28	12	16	.429	Season was cancelled due to the COVID-19 pandemic
AX Armani Exchange Milan	2020-21	41	25	16	.610	Lost in EuroLeague Semifinals
AX Armani Exchange Milan	2021-22					
Career		377	279	98	.740	

=== Domestic Leagues ===
Team	Year	G	W	L	W–L%	Result
PBC CSKA Moscow	2007–08	32	31	1	.9688	Won 2008 Russian Super League 1 Finals
PBC CSKA Moscow	2008–09	32	30	2	.9375	Won 2009 Russian Super League 1 Finals
Real Madrid	2009–10	42	31	11	.7381	Lost 2010 Liga ACB Second Round
Real Madrid	2010–11	40	29	11	.7250	Lost 2011 Liga ACB Second Round
PBC CSKA Moscow	2012–13	31	24	7	.7742	Won 2013 VTB United League Finals
PBC CSKA Moscow	2013–14	29	24	5	.8276	Won 2014 VTB United League Finals
AX Armani Exchange Olimpia Milan	2019–20	21	14	7	.7500	League cancelled due to the COVID-19 pandemic
AX Armani Exchange Olimpia Milan	2020–21	38	28	10	.7368	Lost 2021 Italian League Finals
Career		265	213	52	.8038	

== See also ==
- List of EuroLeague-winning head coaches
- List of foreign NBA coaches
