= Matjaž Smodiš =

Slovenian basketball player

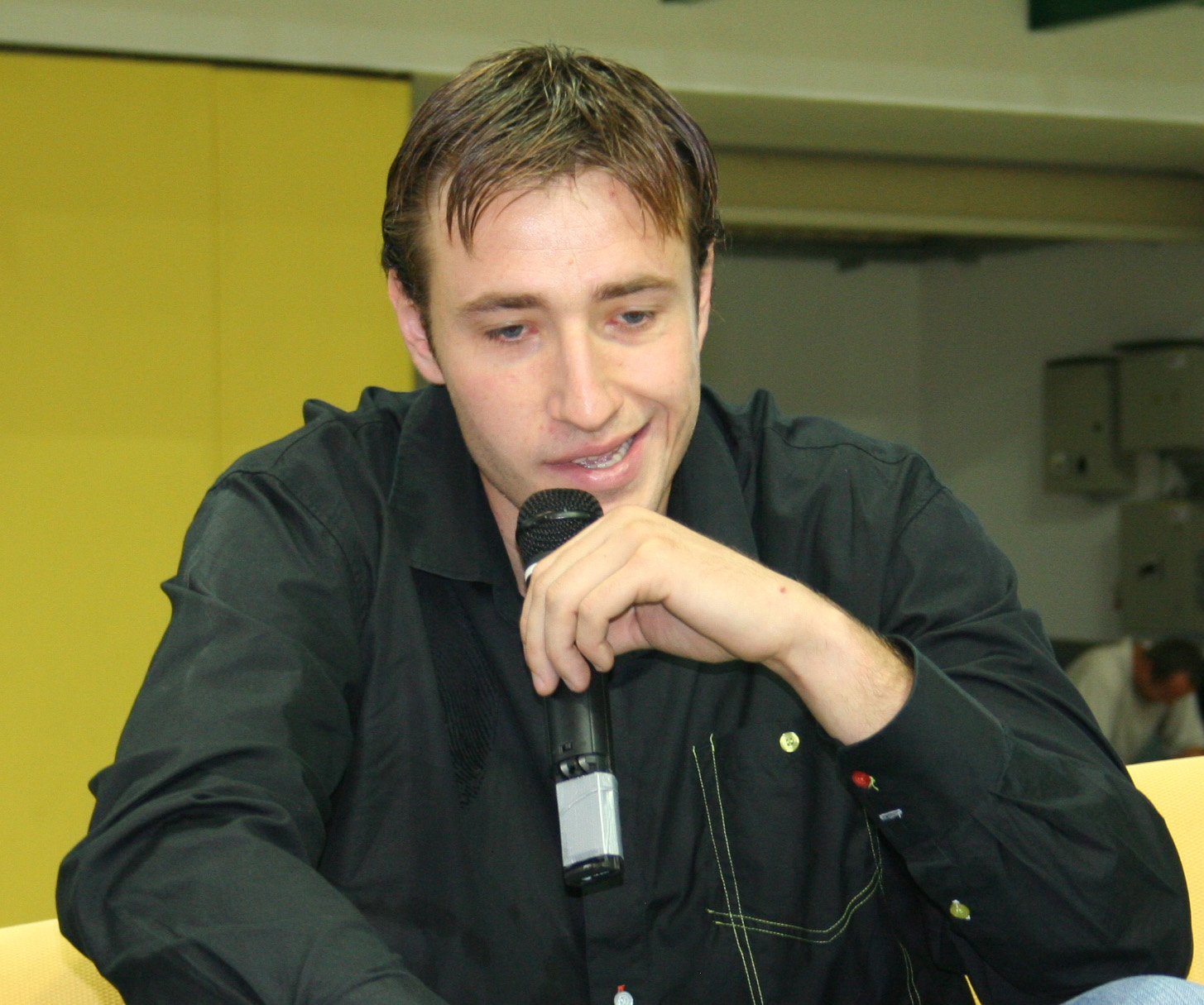
- Smodiš, during an interview in 2007

Personal information
- Born: 13 December 1979 (age 46) Trbovlje, SR Slovenia, SFR Yugoslavia
- Listed height: 6 ft 8.75 in (2.05 m)
- Listed weight: 265 lb (120 kg)

Career information
- NBA draft: 2001: undrafted
- Playing career: 1994–2013
- Position: Power forward / center
- Number: 8, 33

Career history
- 1994–2000: Krka Novo Mesto
- 2000–2003: Virtus Bologna
- 2003–2005: Fortitudo Bologna
- 2005–2011: CSKA Moscow
- 2011–2012: Cedevita Zagreb
- 2012–2013: Krka Novo Mesto

Career highlights
- 3× EuroLeague champion (2001, 2006, 2008); All-EuroLeague Second Team (2007); 2× LBA champion (2001, 2005); 2× Italian Cup winner (2001, 2002); LBA All-Star (2004); 2× VTB United League champion (2008, 2010); 6× RPBL champion (2006–2011); 3× Russian Cup winner (2006, 2007, 2010); All-RPBL Second Team (2009); Croatian Cup winner (2012); Croatian Cup MVP (2012); 2× Slovenian League champion (2000, 2013); Slovenian League Finals MVP (2013); 2× Slovenian League All Star (1999, 2000)
Medals
Men's basketball
Representing Slovenia
FIBA U20 European Championship
| Silver medal – second place | 1998 Italy | Under-20 Team |

Matjaž Smodiš (born 13 December 1979) is a Slovenian former professional basketball player. Standing at a height of 2.05 m (6'8 3/4") tall, he played at the power forward and center positions. During his pro club playing career, he played in seven EuroLeague Finals (2001, 2002, 2004, 2006, 2007, 2008, 2009), and he was a three-time EuroLeague champion (2001, 2006, 2008). He was also an All-EuroLeague Second Team selection in 2007. Smodiš was also the team captain of the senior Slovenian national team. He is currently a sporting director of KK Žoltasti Troti.

== Professional career ==
During his pro career, Smodiš played with teams like Krka Novo Mesto of the Slovenian League and the Italian League clubs Virtus Bologna and Climamio Bologna. Smodiš also played with the Russian League club CSKA Moscow, from 2005 to 2011, being one of the team's major stars. In 2011, he left CSKA Moscow, and signed with the Croatian club Cedevita Zagreb (A1 Croatian League).

On 30 November 2012 he signed with his home town team, Krka. Smodiš announced his retirement from playing professional basketball in May 2013, after leading Krka to their 4th consecutive Slovenian national domestic league championship.

== National team career ==
Smodiš was a member of the Slovenian Under-20 junior national team that won the silver medal at the 1998 FIBA Europe Under-20 Championship. Smodiš also played with the senior Slovenian national team. With Slovenia's senior national team, he played at the 1999 EuroBasket, the 2001 EuroBasket, the 2007 EuroBasket, the 2009 EuroBasket, and the 2011 EuroBasket.

== Career statistics ==
Legend
| GP | Games played | GS | Games started | MPG | Minutes per game |
| FG% | Field-goal percentage | 3P% | 3-point field-goal percentage | FT% | Free-throw percentage |
| RPG | Rebounds per game | APG | Assists per game | SPG | Steals per game |
| BPG | Blocks per game | PPG | Points per game | PIR | Performance index rating |
| **Bold** | Career high | † | Won a EuroLeague championship |

=== EuroLeague ===
| Year | Team | GP | GS | MPG | FG% | 3P% | FT% | RPG | APG | SPG | BPG | PPG | PIR |
|---|---|---|---|---|---|---|---|---|---|---|---|---|---|
| 2000–01† | Virtus Bologna | 21 | 2 | 15.2 | .505 | .326 | .769 | 2.2 | .4 | .6 | .2 | 7.5 | 6.0 |
| 2001–02 | Virtus Bologna | **22** | 8 | 21.9 | **.575** | .417 | **.898** | 5.1 | .5 | .7 | .5 | 11.5 | 13.0 |
| 2002–03 | Virtus Bologna | 11 | 9 | 19.5 | .444 | .375 | .706 | 3.6 | .7 | .9 | **.9** | 9.8 | 9.0 |
| 2003–04 | Fortitudo Bologna | 21 | 17 | **26.8** | .548 | .404 | .860 | 4.7 | .7 | **1.4** | .5 | 11.2 | 12.9 |
| 2004–05 | Fortitudo Bologna | 14 | 2 | 20.7 | .573 | .455 | .811 | 4.1 | .8 | **1.4** | .4 | 10.5 | 12.0 |
| 2005–06† | CSKA Moscow | 21 | 13 | 25.3 | .466 | .381 | .717 | **5.5** | .7 | 1.2 | .5 | 12.0 | 13.1 |
| 2006–07 | CSKA Moscow | 22 | **19** | 24.6 | .497 | .420 | .713 | 3.8 | 1.3 | .7 | .1 | 12.9 | 14.3 |
| 2007–08† | CSKA Moscow | 11 | 8 | 24.5 | .538 | **.471** | .804 | 5.3 | 1.1 | .4 | .2 | **14.3** | **16.4** |
| 2008–09 | CSKA Moscow | 15 | 12 | 22.8 | .380 | .386 | .816 | 3.2 | **1.4** | .5 | .1 | 10.3 | 8.9 |
| 2009–10 | CSKA Moscow | 2 | 0 | 9.3 | .000 | .000 | — | 1.5 | — | — | — | 0.0 | 0.5 |
| 2010–11 | CSKA Moscow | 10 | 7 | 19.5 | .333 | .304 | .700 | 2.7 | .4 | .2 | — | 6.8 | 4.6 |
| Career | | 170 | 97 | 22.2 | .493 | .395 | .778 | 4.0 | .8 | .8 | .3 | 10.7 | 11.2 |

== Awards and accomplishments ==
=== Pro career ===
- 2× Slovenian League All Star: (1999, 2000)
- 2× Slovenian League Champion: (2000, 2013)
- 2× Italian Cup Winner: (2001, 2002)
- 2× Italian League Champion: (2001, 2005)
- 3× EuroLeague Champion: (2001, 2006, 2008)
- 2× Triple Crown Winner: (2001, 2006)
- 4× EuroLeague runner-up: (2002, 2004, 2007, 2009)
- Italian League All-Star: (2004)
- 3× Russian Cup Winner: (2006, 2007, 2010)
- 6× Russian Championship Champion: (2006, 2007, 2008, 2009, 2010, 2011)
- All-EuroLeague Second Team: (2007)
- 2× VTB United League Champion: (2008, 2010)
- Croatian Cup Winner: (2012)
- Croatian Cup MVP: (2012)
- Slovenian League Finals MVP: (2013)

=== Slovenian junior national team ===
- 1998 FIBA Europe Under-20 Championship: Silver
