= Ramūnas Šiškauskas =

Lithuanian basketball player and coach

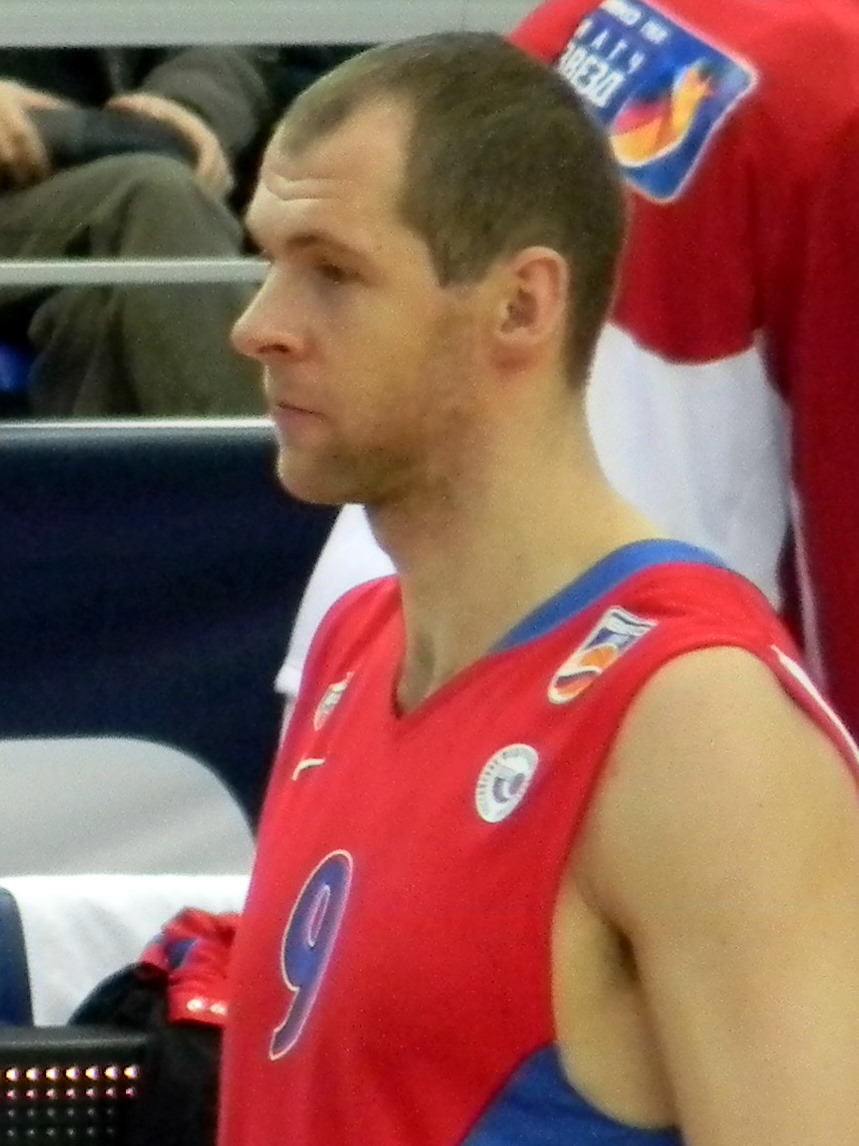
- Šiškauskas with CSKA Moscow in 2011

Personal information
- Born: September 10, 1978 (age 48) Kaišiadorys, Lithuanian SSR, Soviet Union
- Listed height: 6 ft 6 in (1.98 m)
- Listed weight: 220 lb (100 kg)

Career information
- Playing career: 1996–2012
- Position: Shooting guard / small forward
- Number: 8, 9
- Coaching career: 2017–2019

Career history

Playing
- 1996–1998: Sakalai Vilnius
- 1998–2004: Lietuvos rytas Vilnius
- 2004–2006: Benetton Treviso
- 2006–2007: Panathinaikos Athens
- 2007–2012: CSKA Moscow

Coaching
- 2017–2019: Lithuania national team (assistant)

Career highlights
- As a player: 2× EuroLeague champion (2007, 2008); EuroLeague MVP (2008); All-EuroLeague First Team (2008); 3× All-EuroLeague Second Team (2007, 2009, 2010); EuroLeague 2000–2010 All-Decade Team (2010); EuroLeague Legend (2014); EuroLeague 25th Anniversary Team (2025); 5× Russian League champion (2008–2012); 3× VTB United League champion (2008, 2010, 2012); 2× LKL champion (2000, 2002); Greek League champion (2007); Lega Serie A champion (2006); North European League champion (2002); Italian Cup winner (2005); Greek Cup winner (2007); Russian Cup winner (2010); 2× LKL MVP (2001, 2002); Russian League MVP (2009); Lega Serie A Finals MVP (2006); LKL Finals MVP (2001); VTB United League Final Four MVP (2008); All-Greek League Team (2007); All-Russian League First Team (2009); Lithuanian Sportsman of the Year (2007); Lithuanian Basketball Player of the Year (2008); 4× LKL All-Star (2001–2004); Russian All-Star (2011)
Medals
Men's basketball
Representing Lithuania
Summer Olympics
Bronze medal – third place	2000 Sydney
EuroBasket
Gold medal – first place	2003 Sweden
Bronze medal – third place	2007 Spain

Ramūnas Šiškauskas ([rɐˈmûːnɐs ɕɪʃˈkɐ̂ˑʊskɐs], born September 10, 1978) is a Lithuanian former professional basketball player and coach. Listed at 1.98 m (6 ft 6 in) tall, he could play at both the shooting guard and small forward positions. His individual accolades as a player include a EuroLeague MVP award, four All-EuroLeague Team selections, as well as an All-EuroBasket Team designation. On May 16, 2014, Šiškauskas was named a EuroLeague Legend.

During his playing career, Šiškauskas won two EuroLeague titles, one each with Panathinaikos Athens and CSKA Moscow, in 2007 and 2008, and reached two more EuroLeague Finals with CSKA, in 2009 and 2012. He was a member of the senior Lithuanian national team that won the gold medal at the EuroBasket 2003. As a member of Lithuania's national team, he also won the bronze medal at the 2000 Summer Olympics, and the bronze medal at the EuroBasket 2007.

== Professional playing career ==
=== Lithuania ===
Šiškauskas made his pro debut with Sakalai in 1996. He played two seasons with the club, averaging 11.3 points, on 60 percent shooting.

In 1998, Šiškauskas signed with Lietuvos Rytas of Vilnius. He played there until the 2003–04 season, and led the team to Lithuanian League titles in 2000 and 2002, and a Northern Europe League title in 2002. In 2002–03, he had his most successful season, averaging 16.4 points, on 68 percent shooting, and 3.4 rebounds.

=== Italy ===
Šiškauskas joined Benetton Treviso in 2004. He led them to an Italian League title in 2006, where he was named the Finals MVP, and to an Italian Cup title in 2005. He played in 32 EuroLeague games over two seasons with Benetton, and averaged 12.3 points, on 60 percent shooting.

=== Greece ===
In 2006, Šiškauskas signed with Panathinaikos, and he helped them win the EuroLeague in 2007. He averaged 11 points, on 51 percent shooting for the championship team. With Panathinaikos, he also won a Greek League title, and the Greek Cup, in 2007.

=== Russia ===
Šiškauskas joined CSKA Moscow in 2007. He helped to lead them to a EuroLeague title in 2008, and helped them reach the EuroLeague Final in 2009. Which, however, CSKA lost to Šiškauskas' former team, Panathinaikos. On May 1, 2009, he scored a career-high 29 points against Barcelona. Šiškauskas also won five Russian Championship titles (2008, 2009, 2010, 2011, 2012).

On May 13, 2012, Šiškauskas missed two vital free-throws, with 10 seconds remaining in CSKA's EuroLeague Finals game against Olympiacos Piraeus, which proved crucial in CSKA's 62 to 61 loss. He also missed the last second three-point shot in CSKA's EuroLeague Finals game against Panathinaikos, on May 3, 2009, which meant that CSKA lost that final, by a score of 73 to 71.

Only one week after the 2012 EuroLeague Finals game, on May 21, 2012, Šiškauskas announced his retirement from playing professional basketball. On May 16, 2014, Šiškauskas was named a EuroLeague Legend.

== National team career ==
=== Lithuanian junior national team ===
Šiškauskas played with the junior national teams of Lithuania. With Lithuania's junior national team, he played at the 1998 FIBA Europe Under-20 Championship.

=== Lithuanian senior national team ===
Šiškauskas was a member of the senior men's Lithuanian national basketball teams that won the bronze medal at the 2000 Summer Olympics, and the bronze medal at the EuroBasket 2007. He was also a member of the Lithuanian team that won the gold medal at the EuroBasket 2003. He also played at the EuroBasket 2001, at the 2004 Summer Olympics, at the EuroBasket 2005, and at the 2008 Summer Olympics.

After the 2008 Summer Olympics, he officially announced that he was stepping down from the Lithuanian national team as a player.

== Player profile ==
Šiškauskas was a physical small forward, who could also easily play, both on offense and defense, in either the point guard or shooting guard positions, on the wing, and also in the paint. His excellent leaping ability, and his quickness, made him a surprising shot blocker, and one of the best one-on-one players and swingmen in Europe. He was considered the best defensive player of the senior Lithuanian national basketball team. He led the 2003–04 season of the Lithuanian League, in free throw percentage (90.6%).

== Coaching career ==
Šiškauskas began his basketball coaching career in 2017, when he became an assistant coach of the senior men's Lithuanian national basketball team. In 2019, head coach Dainius Adomaitis resigned and Šiškauskas left the Lithuania men's national team coaching staff as well.

== Career statistics ==
Legend
GP	Games played	GS	Games started	MPG	Minutes per game
FG%	Field-goal percentage	3P%	3-point field-goal percentage	FT%	Free-throw percentage
RPG	Rebounds per game	APG	Assists per game	SPG	Steals per game
BPG	Blocks per game	PPG	Points per game	PIR	Performance index rating
**Bold**	Career high

=== EuroLeague ===
†	Denotes season in which Šiškauskas won the EuroLeague
*	Led the league

Year	Team	GP	GS	MPG	FG%	3P%	FT%	RPG	APG	SPG	BPG	PPG	PIR
2004–05	Benetton Treviso	17	10	25.8	.487	.286	.700	2.4	1.5	**1.4**	.1	12.5	11.8
2005–06	Benetton Treviso	15	13	29.2	.516	.419	.711	2.8	1.9	**1.4**	.1	12.0	13.5
2006–07†	Panathinaikos	20	19	26.2	.489	.471	.706	2.5	1.1	1.1	.3	10.9	11.6
2007–08†	CSKA Moscow	**24**	**23**	27.3	.510	.442	.846	3.2	1.4	1.1	**.4**	**14.0**	16.0
2008–09	CSKA Moscow	18	14	28.4	.446	.348	**.863**	3.0	1.7	.8	.3	12.1	13.9
2009–10	CSKA Moscow	21	21	**30.9**	**.557**	**.550***	.765	**4.0**	**3.0**	1.2	.3	13.4	**17.0**
2010–11	CSKA Moscow	7	6	24.9	.422	.348	.500	**4.0**	.9	1.3	.1	7.0	8.9
2011–12	CSKA Moscow	21	21*	22.9	.449	.393	.690	2.2	1.0	.6	.0	7.5	6.7
Career		143	127	27.1	.493	.419	.767	3.0	1.6	1.1	.2	11.6	12.8

== Awards and achievements ==
=== State awards ===
- Lithuania: Recipient of the Commander's Cross of the Order of the Lithuanian Grand Duke Gediminas (2001)
- Lithuania: Recipient of the Commander's Grand Cross of the Order for Merits to Lithuania (2003)
- Lithuania: Recipient of the Commander's Grand Cross of the Order of the Lithuanian Grand Duke Gediminas (2007)

=== Pro playing career ===
On May 15, 2009, Šiškauskas signed a contract extension with CSKA Moscow. He signed through 2011. Šiškauskas said of the contract: "I feel like the right man, in the right place in CSKA. I am happy with both the team, and the organization. That is why I don't see any reason to think about changes. I feel myself as a part of history of a great club, which is aiming for the highest goals. And that's what absolutely matches with my character."

— Ramūnas Šiškauskas
- 2× Lithuanian League Champion: (2000, 2002)
- 2× Lithuanian League MVP: (2001, 2002)
- Lithuanian League Finals MVP: (2001)
- 4× Lithuanian League All-Star: (2001, 2002, 2003, 2004)
- North European League: Champion (2002)
- Italian Cup Winner: (2005)
- Italian League Champion: (2006)
- Italian League Finals MVP: (2006)
- Greek Cup Winner: (2007)
- 4× All-EuroLeague Team:
  - 3× All-EuroLeague Second Team: (2007, 2009, 2010)
  - All-EuroLeague First Team: (2008)
- 2× EuroLeague Champion: (2007, 2008)
- Greek League Champion: (2007)
- Triple Crown Champion: (2007)
- Greek League Best Five: (2007)
- Lithuanian Sportsman of the Year: (2007)
- EuroLeague MVP: (2008)
- 5× Russian League Champion: (2008, 2009, 2010, 2011, 2012)
- Russian League Player of the Year: (2009)
- VTB United League Final Four MVP: (2008)
- All-Europe Player of the Year: (2008)
- EuroLeague 2000–2010 All-Decade Team: (2010)
- Russian Cup: Winner (2010)
- Russian League All-Star: (2011)
- Russian League All-Symbolic Second Team: (2011)
- 3× VTB United League Champion: (2008, 2010, 2012)
- EuroLeague Legend: (2014)

=== Lithuanian senior national team as a player ===
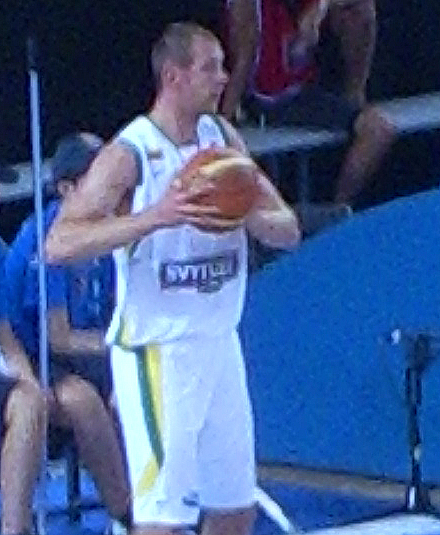
Šiškauskas, with the senior Lithuanian NT, at EuroBasket 2007.

- 2000 Summer Olympics: Bronze
- EuroBasket 2003: Gold
- EuroBasket 2007: Bronze
- EuroBasket 2007: All-Tournament Team
