= 2009 Euroleague Final Four =

Basketball tournament

- Season: 2008–09 Euroleague

Tournament details
- Arena: O2 World; Berlin, Germany
- Dates: May 1, – May 3, 2009

Final positions
- Champions: (Greece) Panathinaikos (5th title)
- Runners-up: (Russia) CSKA Moscow
- Third place: (Spain) FC Barcelona
- Fourth place: (Greece) Olympiacos

Awards and statistics
- MVP: (Greece) Vassilis Spanoulis

The 2009 Euroleague Final Four was the concluding Euroleague Final Four tournament of the 2008–09 Euroleague season. It was held in May 2009. All of the games were held at the O2 World, in Berlin Germany. Panathinaikos won the title, which was their fifth at the time.

== Bracket ==
Semifinals; May 1
(Spain) Regal FC Barcelona	78
(Russia) CSKA Moscow	82
(Greece) Olympiacos	82
(Greece) Panathinaikos	84

Final; May 3
(Russia) CSKA Moscow	71
(Greece) Panathinaikos	73
Third place
(Spain) Regal FC Barcelona	95
(Greece) Olympiacos	79

== Semifinals ==
=== FC Barcelona vs. CSKA Moscow ===
May 1
18:00 CET

Report

Regal FC Barcelona (Spain)	78–82	(Russia) CSKA Moscow
Scoring by quarter: 21-12, 15-20, 20-22, 22-28
Pts: Andersen 24; Rebs: Santiago 6 Asts: Lakovič 5		Pts: Šiškauskas 29; Rebs: Khryapa 9 Asts: Holden 4

O2 World, Berlin
Attendance: 13,238
Referees: Voreadis (GRE), Bachar (ISR), Belosevic (SRB)

=== Olympiacos vs. Panathinaikos ===
May 1
21:00 CET

Report

Olympiacos (Greece)	82–84	(Greece) Panathinaikos
Scoring by quarter: 21-27, 20-16, 22-23, 19-18
Pts: Greer 18; Rebs: Bourousis 7 Asts: Papaloukas 5		Pts: Peković 20; Rebs: Batiste, Fotsis 6 Asts: Jasikevičius 5

O2 World, Berlin
Attendance: 13,238
Referees: Brazauskas (LTU), Arteaga (ESP), Rocha (POR)

== Third-place playoff ==
May 3
17:00 CET

Report

Olympiacos (Greece)	79–95	(Spain) Regal FC Barcelona
Scoring by quarter: 19-26, 11-20, 28-27, 21-22
Pts: Greer 19; Rebs: Bourousis 9 Asts: Papaloukas 4		Pts: Andersen 20; Rebs: Vázquez 5 Asts: Lakovič 5

O2 World, Berlin
Attendance: 13,238
Referees: Belosevic (SRB), Pukl (SLO), Zamojski (POL), Rocha (POR)

== Final ==
May 3
20:00 CET

Report

Panathinaikos (Greece)	73–71	(Russia) CSKA Moscow
Scoring by quarter: 21-16, 27-12, 8-18, 17-25
Pts: Spanoulis, Fotsis 13; Rebs: Fotsis 8 Asts: Jasikevičius 4		Pts: Holden 14; Rebs: Smodiš 9 Asts: Holden 4

O2 World, Berlin
Attendance: 13,238
Referees: Brazauskas (LTU), Arteaga (ESP), Bachar (ISR), Rocha (POR)

Panathinaikos	CSKA Moscow

Starters:			P	R	A
PG	6	(Greece) Vassilis Spanoulis	13	0	0
SG	11	(United States) Drew Nicholas	7	1	1
SF	7	(Greece) Stratos Perperoglou	6	2	2
PF	9	(Greece) Antonis Fotsis	13	8	1
C	14	(Montenegro) Nikola Peković	6	2	0
Reserves:			P	R	A
SF	5	(Serbia) Dušan Kecman	DNP		
C	8	(United States) Mike Batiste	6	4	0
SG	10	(Greece) Nikos Chatzivrettas	DNP		
PF	12	(Greece) Kostas Tsartsaris	2	1	0
PG	13	(Greece) Dimitris Diamantidis	10	4	3
PF	15	(Greece) Dušan Šakota	DNP		
PG	19	(Lithuania) Šarūnas Jasikevičius	10	4	4
Head coach:
(Serbia) Željko Obradović

2008–09 Euroleague
Champions

Panathinaikos
5th title

Starters:			P	R	A
PG	10	(Russia) J.R. Holden	14	1	4
SG	21	(United States) Trajan Langdon	13	4	1
SF	31	(Russia) Victor Khryapa	9	7	1
PF	8	(Slovenia) Matjaž Smodiš	9	9	0
C	12	(Slovenia) Erazem Lorbek	5	1	0
Reserves:			P	R	A
PG	6	(Greece) Nikos Zisis	0	0	0
SG	7	(Russia) Victor Keyru	DNP		
SF	9	(Lithuania) Ramūnas Šiškauskas	13	0	0
PF	20	(Russia) Andrey Vorontsevich	DNP		
C	24	(Russia) Sasha Kaun	3	3	0
PG	34	(Croatia) Zoran Planinić	5	3	1
PF	44	(United States) Terence Morris	0	0	0
Head coach:
(Italy) Ettore Messina

- Team captains (C): (Greece) Fragiskos Alvertis (Panathinaikos) and (Slovenia) Matjaž Smodiš (CSKA Moscow)

== Awards ==
=== Euroleague Final Four MVP ===
- (Greece) Vassilis Spanoulis ( (Greece) Panathinaikos)

=== Euroleague Finals Top Scorer ===
- (Russia) J.R. Holden ( (Russia) CSKA Moscow)
