= 2008–09 Euroleague =

EuroLeague season

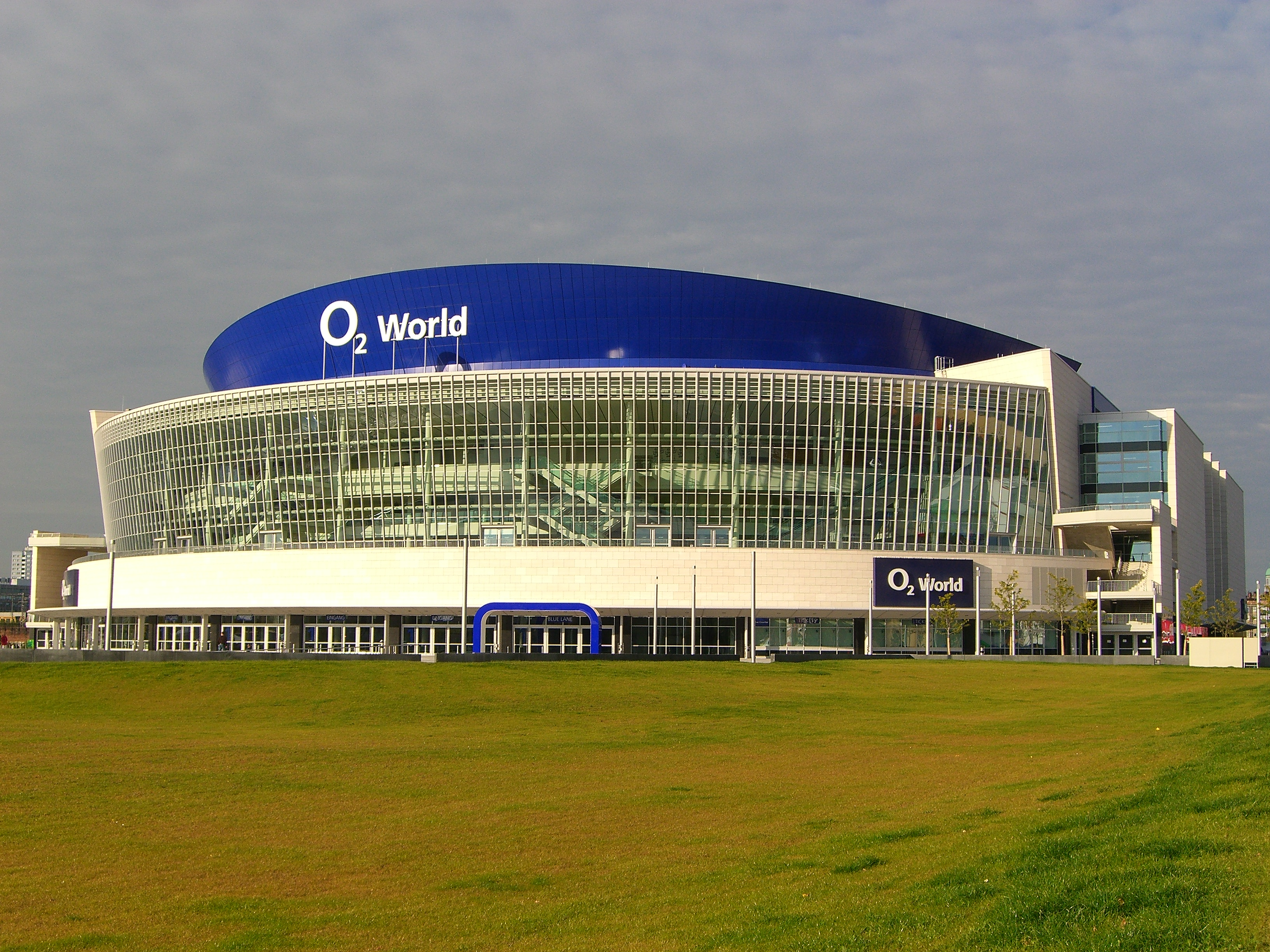
- The Final Four was held in the O_{2} World in Berlin
- Season: 2008–09
- Duration: 22 October 2008 – 3 May 2009
- Games played: 188
- Teams: 24

Regular season
- Season MVP: (Spain) Juan Carlos Navarro

Finals
- Champions: (Greece) Panathinaikos (5th title)
- Runners-up: (Russia) CSKA Moscow
- Third place: (Spain) FC Barcelona
- Fourth place: (Greece) Olympiacos
- Final Four MVP: (Greece) Vassilis Spanoulis

Awards
- Rising Star: (Serbia) Novica Veličković
- Best Defender: (Greece) Dimitris Diamantidis
- Coach of the Year: (Serbia) Duško Vujošević

Statistical leaders
Points	(Serbia) Igor Rakočević	18.0
Rebounds	(Turkey) Mirsad Türkcan	8.6
Assists	(Greece) Theodoros Papaloukas	5.2
Index Rating	(Israel) D'or Fischer	21.5

The 2008–09 Euroleague was the 9th season of the professional basketball competition for elite clubs throughout Europe, organised by Euroleague Basketball Company, and it was the 52nd season of the premier competition for European men's clubs overall. The season, which featured 24 teams from 13 countries, culminated in the 2008–09 Euroleague Final Four at the new O_{2} World arena in Berlin, Germany. It was won by Panathinaikos, who defeated in the final, the defending champions, CSKA Moscow.

While the general structure of the competition was identical to that used in recent seasons, changes were made to the format for two of its phases, the Regular Season and Quarterfinals.

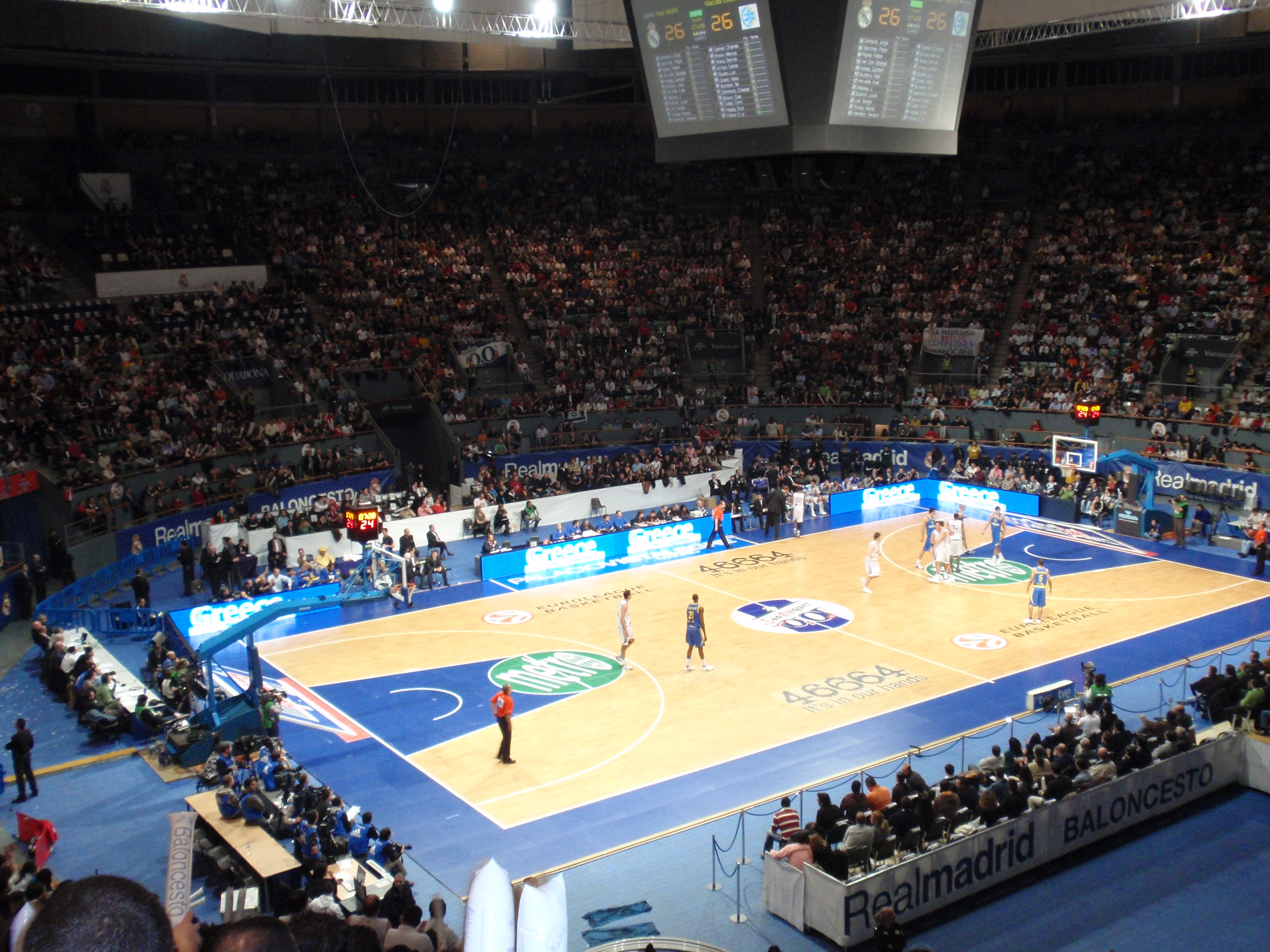
Top 16 game between Real Madrid and Maccabi Electra

== Teams of the 2008–09 Euroleague ==
Key to colors
Champion
Runner-up
Third place
Fourth place
Eliminated in Quarterfinals
Eliminated in Last 16
Eliminated in the regular season

LC: 3-year licence

Country (League)	Teams	Teams (ranking in 2007-08 national championship)				
Spain (ACB)	5	Tau Cerámica (1)^{LC}	FC Barcelona (2)^{LC}	DKV Joventut (3)^{UC}	Unicaja Málaga (4)^{LC}	Real Madrid (QF)^{LC}
Italy (Lega A)	4	Montepaschi Siena (1)^{LC}	Lottomatica Roma (2)	Air Avellino (3)	Armani Jeans Milano (4)	
Greece (ESAKE A1)	3	Panathinaikos (1)^{LC}	Olympiacos (2)^{LC}	Panionios Forthnet (3)		
Turkey (TBL)	2	Fenerbahçe Ülker (1)^{LC}	Efes Pilsen (4)^{LC}			
France (LNB Pro A)	2	Nancy (1)	Le Mans (SF)^{LC}			
Lithuania (LKL)	1	Žalgiris (1)				
Germany (BBL)	1	Alba Berlin (1)				
Croatia (A1 Liga)	1	Cibona (3)^{LC}				
Russia (Superleague A)	1	CSKA Moscow (1)				
Israel (BSL)	1	Maccabi Electra (2)^{LC}				
Slovenia (SKL)	1	Union Olimpija (1)^{LC}				
Serbia (KLS)	1	Partizan (1)				
Poland (PLK)	1	Asseco Prokom Sopot (1)				

- ^{uc:} DKV Joventut qualified as ULEB Cup winners.

== Format ==
Regular Season

The first phase was a regular season, in which the competing teams were drawn into four groups, each containing six teams. Each team played every other team in its group at home and away, resulting in 10 games for each team in the first stage. The top 4 teams in each group advanced to the next round. This was the first year for this particular format; previously, the competing teams were split into three groups of eight teams each, with the top five teams in each group plus the best sixth-place team advancing.

If two or more clubs finished level on won-lost record, tiebreakers were applied in the following order:

1. Head-to-head record in matches between the tied clubs
2. Overall point difference in games between the tied clubs
3. Overall point difference in all group matches
4. Points scored in all group matches
5. Sum of quotients of points scored and points allowed in each group match

Games were played from October 22, 2008 to January 15, 2009.

Top 16

The surviving teams were then divided into four groups of four teams each, and again a round-robin system was adopted resulting in 6 games each, with the top 2 teams advancing to the quarterfinals. Tiebreakers are identical to those used in the Regular Season. Games began on January 28 and ended March 12.

Quarterfinals

In the quarterfinals, the top placed teams from each Top 16 group played second placed teams from a different group in a best-of-five playoff series, with the winners of those series advancing to the Final Four. This was the first season in which the quarterfinals were best-of-five; previously, they had been best-of-three. The quarterfinal matches were played from March 24 until April 9.

Final Four format

The culminating stage of the Euroleague in which the four remaining teams played a semifinal match and the winners of those advance to the final. The losers played in a third-place playoff. The team which was victorious in the Final (Panathinaikos) would be Euroleague champion. The Final Four semifinals were played May 1, with the third-place game and final on May 3.

== Regular season ==
The regular season began on October 20, 2008 and concluded on January 15, 2009.

Key to colors
Top four places in each group advanced to Top 16

=== Group A ===
	Team	Pld	W	L	PF	PA	Diff
1.	(Spain) Unicaja Málaga	10	8	2	771	698	+73
2.	(Greece) Olympiacos	10	6	4	815	748	+67
3.	(Israel) Maccabi Electra	10	6	4	815	811	+4
4.	(Croatia) Cibona VIP	10	5	5	760	772	-12
5.	(Italy) Air Avellino	10	3	7	754	814	-60
6.	(France) Le Mans	10	2	8	747	819	-72

=== Group B ===
	Team	Pld	W	L	PF	PA	Diff
1.	(Spain) FC Barcelona	10	9	1	813	650	+163
2.	(Italy) Montepaschi Siena	10	8	2	835	750	+85
3.	(Greece) Panathinaikos	10	7	3	763	707	+56
4.	(Poland) Asseco Prokom Sopot	10	2	8	675	734	-59
5.	(Lithuania) Žalgiris	10	2	8	716	812	-96
6.	(France) Nancy	10	2	8	706	855	-149

=== Group C ===
	Team	Pld	W	L	PF	PA	Diff
1.	(Spain) Tau Cerámica	10	8	2	916	808	+108
2.	(Italy) Lottomatica Roma	10	6	4	814	786	+28
3.	(Turkey) Fenerbahçe Ülker	10	6	4	779	755	+24
4.	(Germany) Alba Berlin	10	4	6	691	748	-57
5.	(Spain) DKV Joventut	10	4	6	800	810	-10
6.	(Slovenia) Union Olimpija	10	2	8	725	818	-93

=== Group D ===
	Team	Pld	W	L	PF	PA	Diff
1.	(Russia) CSKA Moscow	10	7	3	774	644	+130
2.	(Spain) Real Madrid	10	6	4	740	707	+33
3.	(Italy) Armani Jeans Milano	10	5	5	734	745	-11
4.	(Serbia) Partizan	10	5	5	706	687	+19
5.	(Turkey) Efes Pilsen	10	4	6	713	762	-49
6.	(Greece) Panionios Forthnet	10	3	7	668	790	-122

== Top 16 ==
The Top 16 stage was played from January 28 to March 12, 2009.

The draw was conducted on January 19 at Euroleague Basketball Company headquarters in Barcelona. The group winners in the Regular Season were drawn from one pot, the runners-up from one pot, the teams in 3rd place from one pot and those in 4th place from one pot. Teams that played in the same group in the Regular Season could not meet again in the Top 16. Also, teams from the same country could not be drawn into the same pool unless it was necessary to prevent teams from the same Regular Season group from being drawn together.

Key to colors
Top two places in each group advanced to quarterfinals

=== Group E ===
	Team	Pld	W	L	PF	PA	Diff
1.	(Greece) Olympiacos	6	5	1	496	446	+50
2.	(Spain) Tau Cerámica	6	4	2	556	474	+82
3.	(Italy) Armani Jeans Milano	6	2	4	455	529	-74
4.	(Poland) Asseco Prokom Sopot	6	1	5	444	502	-58

=== Group F ===
	Team	Pld	W	L	PF	PA	Diff
1.	(Spain) FC Barcelona	6	5	1	508	429	+79
2.	(Spain) Real Madrid	6	5	1	505	487	+18
3.	(Israel) Maccabi Electra	6	2	4	459	481	-22
4.	(Germany) Alba Berlin	6	0	6	427	502	-75

*FC Barcelona wins the group over Real Madrid by the head-to-head point differential.

=== Group G ===
	Team	Pld	W	L	PF	PA	Diff
1.	(Greece) Panathinaikos	6	5	1	503	428	+72
2.	(Serbia) Partizan	6	4	2	420	434	-14
3.	(Spain) Unicaja Málaga	6	2	4	484	461	+23
4.	(Italy) Lottomatica Roma	6	1	5	441	525	-84

=== Group H ===
	Team	Pld	W	L	PF	PA	Diff
1.	(Russia) CSKA Moscow	6	5	1	454	377	+77
2.	(Italy) Montepaschi Siena	6	4	2	472	456	+16
3.	(Croatia) Cibona VIP	6	2	4	423	456	-33
4.	(Turkey) Fenerbahçe Ülker	6	1	5	384	444	-60

== Quarterfinals ==
Team 1 hosted Games 1 and 2, plus Game 5 if necessary. Team 2 hosted Game 3, and Game 4 if necessary.

Team 1	Agg.	Team 2	1st leg	2nd leg	3rd leg	4th leg	5th leg
Olympiacos (Greece)	3–1	(Spain) Real Madrid	88–79	79–73	63–71	78–75	
Regal FC Barcelona (Spain)	3–2	(Spain) Tau Cerámica	75–84	85–62	62–69	84–63	78–62
Panathinaikos (Greece)	3–1	(Italy) Montepaschi Siena	90–85	79–84	72–53	91–84	
CSKA Moscow (Russia)	3–0	(Serbia) Partizan	56–47	77–50	67–56		

== Final four ==
The Final Four was played on May 1 and on May 3. Semifinal games were played on Friday, while the third-place playoff and Final were played on Sunday. The event was hosted at the O2 World in Berlin. It was the first time the event was held in Berlin.

Semifinals; May 1
(Spain) Regal FC Barcelona	78
(Russia) CSKA Moscow	82
(Greece) Olympiacos	82
(Greece) Panathinaikos	84

Final; May 3
(Russia) CSKA Moscow	71
(Greece) Panathinaikos	73
Third place
(Spain) Regal FC Barcelona	95
(Greece) Olympiacos	79

== Individual statistics ==
=== Rating ===
Rank	Name	Team	Games	Rating	PIR
1.	(Israel) D'or Fischer	(Israel) Maccabi Electra	13	279	21.46
2.	(United States) Terrell McIntyre	(Italy) Montepaschi Siena	19	377	19.84
3.	(Turkey) Mirsad Türkcan	(Turkey) Fenerbahçe Ülker	14	271	19.36

=== Points ===
Rank	Name	Team	Games	Rating	PPG
1.	(Serbia) Igor Rakočević	(Spain) Tau Cerámica	21	377	17.95
2.	(United States) Terrell McIntyre	(Italy) Montepaschi Siena	19	328	17.26
3.	(Poland) David Logan	(Poland) Asseco Prokom Sopot	15	253	16.87

=== Rebounds ===
Rank	Name	Team	Games	Rating	RPG
1.	(Turkey) Mirsad Türkcan	(Turkey) Fenerbahçe Ülker	14	121	8.64
2.	(Israel) D'or Fischer	(Israel) Maccabi Electra	13	99	7.62
3.	(Greece) Ioannis Bourousis	(Greece) Olympiacos	22	162	7.36

=== Assists ===
Rank	Name	Team	Games	Rating	APG
1.	(Greece) Theodoros Papaloukas	(Greece) Olympiacos	22	114	5.18
2.	(Montenegro) Omar Cook	(Spain) Unicaja Málaga	16	82	5.13
3.	(United States) Terrell McIntyre	(Italy) Montepaschi Siena	19	84	4.42

=== Other Stats ===
Category	Name	Team	Games	Stat
Steals per game	(Poland) David Logan	(Poland) Asseco Prokom Sopot	15	2.67
Blocks per game	(Spain) Fran Vázquez	(Spain) FC Barcelona	23	1.74
Turnovers per game	(Poland) David Logan	(Poland) Asseco Prokom Sopot	15	2.93
Fouls drawn per game	(Slovenia) Sani Bečirović	(Italy) Lottomatica Roma	13	6.23
Minutes per game	(Poland) David Logan	(Poland) Asseco Prokom Sopot	15	34:18
2FG%	(Czech Republic) Luboš Bartoň	(Spain) FC Barcelona	23	0.800
3FG%	(Italy) Marco Mordente	(Italy) Armani Jeans Milano	12	0.555
FT%	(United States) Louis Bullock	(Spain) Real Madrid	20	0.953

=== Game highs ===
Category	Name	Team	Stat
Rating	(Israel) Lior Eliyahu	(Israel) Maccabi Electra	42
Points	(United States) Terrell McIntyre	(Italy) Montepaschi Siena	35
Rebounds	(Republic of Ireland) Pat Burke	(Poland) Asseco Prokom Sopot	20
Assists	(Greece) Theodoros Papaloukas	(Greece) Olympiacos	13
Steals	7 occasions		6
Blocks	(United States) Loren Woods	(Lithuania) Žalgiris	7
Turnovers	3 occasions		8
Fouls Drawn	(Slovenia) Sani Bečirović	(Italy) Lottomatica Roma	12

== Awards ==
=== Euroleague 2008–09 MVP ===
- (Spain) Juan Carlos Navarro ( (Spain) FC Barcelona)

=== Euroleague 2008–09 Final Four MVP ===
- (Greece) Vassilis Spanoulis ( (Greece) Panathinaikos)

=== All-Euroleague Team 2008–09 ===
Position	All-Euroleague First Team	Club team	All-Euroleague Second Team	Club team
PG	(United States) Terrell McIntyre	(Italy) Montepaschi Siena	(Greece) Theodoros Papaloukas	(Greece) Olympiacos
SG/SF	(Serbia) Igor Rakočević	(Spain) Tau Cerámica	(Lithuania) Ramūnas Šiškauskas	(Russia) CSKA Moscow
SG/SF	(Spain) Juan Carlos Navarro	(Spain) FC Barcelona	(Greece) Vassilis Spanoulis	(Greece) Panathinaikos
PF/C	(Greece) Ioannis Bourousis	(Greece) Olympiacos	(Slovenia) Erazem Lorbek	(Russia) CSKA Moscow
PF/C	(Montenegro) Nikola Peković	(Greece) Panathinaikos	(Brazil) Tiago Splitter	(Spain) Tau Cerámica

=== Rising Star ===
- (Serbia) Novica Veličković ( (Serbia) Partizan)

=== Best Defender ===
- (Greece) Dimitris Diamantidis ( (Greece) Panathinaikos)

=== Top Scorer (Alphonso Ford Trophy) ===
- (Serbia) Igor Rakočević ( (Spain) Tau Cerámica)

=== Coach of the Year (Alexander Gomelsky Award) ===
- (Serbia) Duško Vujošević ( (Serbia) Partizan)

=== Club Executive of the Year ===
- (Germany) Marco Baldi ( (Germany) Alba Berlin)

=== MVP Weekly ===
==== Regular season ====
Game	Player	Team	Rating
1	(United States) Will McDonald	(Spain) Tau Cerámica	32
2	(United Kingdom) Pops Mensah-Bonsu	(Spain) Joventut Badalona	37
3	(Serbia) Igor Rakočević	(Spain) Tau Cerámica	34
4	(United States) Mike Hall	(Italy) Armani Jeans Milano	28
5	(Spain) Edu Hernandez-Sonseca	(Spain) Joventut Badalona	38
6	(Israel) Lior Eliyahu	(Israel) Maccabi Electra	42
7	(Guyana) Rawle Marshall	(Croatia) Cibona	34
8	(Slovenia) Sani Bečirović	(Italy) Lottomatica Roma	38
9	(United States) Immanuel McElroy	(Germany) Alba Berlin	38
10	(Turkey) Oğuz Savaş	(Turkey) Fenerbahçe Ülker	41

==== Top 16 ====
Game	Player	Team	PIR
1	(Montenegro) Nikola Peković	(Greece) Panathinaikos	28
1	(Israel) D'or Fischer	(Israel) Maccabi Electra	28
1	(Israel) Lior Eliyahu (2)	(Israel) Maccabi Electra	28
2	(Serbia) Novica Veličković	(Serbia) Partizan	29
3	(Turkey) Ersan İlyasova	(Spain) FC Barcelona	39
4	(Brazil) Tiago Splitter	(Spain) Tau Cerámica	28
5	(United States) Charles Gaines	(Israel) Maccabi Electra	33
5	(United States) Mike Hall (2)	(Italy) Armani Jeans Milano	33
6	(United States) Mike Batiste	(Greece) Panathinaikos	35

==== Quarter-finals ====
Game	Player	Team	PIR
1	(Central African Republic) Romain Sato	(Italy) Montepaschi Siena	36
2	(Slovenia) Erazem Lorbek	(Russia) CSKA Moscow	33
3	(Lithuania) Ramūnas Šiškauskas	(Russia) CSKA Moscow	30
3	(Slovenia) Matjaž Smodiš	(Russia) CSKA Moscow	30
4	(United States) Terrell McIntyre	(Italy) Montepaschi Siena	37
5	(Turkey) Ersan İlyasova (2)	(Spain) FC Barcelona	26

=== MVP of the Month ===
Month	Player	Team
October 2008	(Turkey) Ersan İlyasova	(Spain) FC Barcelona
November 2008	(Slovenia) Sani Bečirović	(Italy) Lottomatica Roma
December 2008	(Israel) Lior Eliyahu	(Israel) Maccabi Electra
January 2009	(Serbia) Igor Rakočević	(Spain) Tau Cerámica
February 2009	(Serbia) Novica Veličković	(Serbia) Partizan
March 2009	(Slovenia) Erazem Lorbek	(Russia) CSKA Moscow

== See also ==
- ULEB Eurocup 2008–09
- EuroChallenge 2008–09
