= Theodoros Papaloukas =

Greek basketball player (born 1977)

Theodoros Papaloukas Θεόδωρος Παπαλουκάς
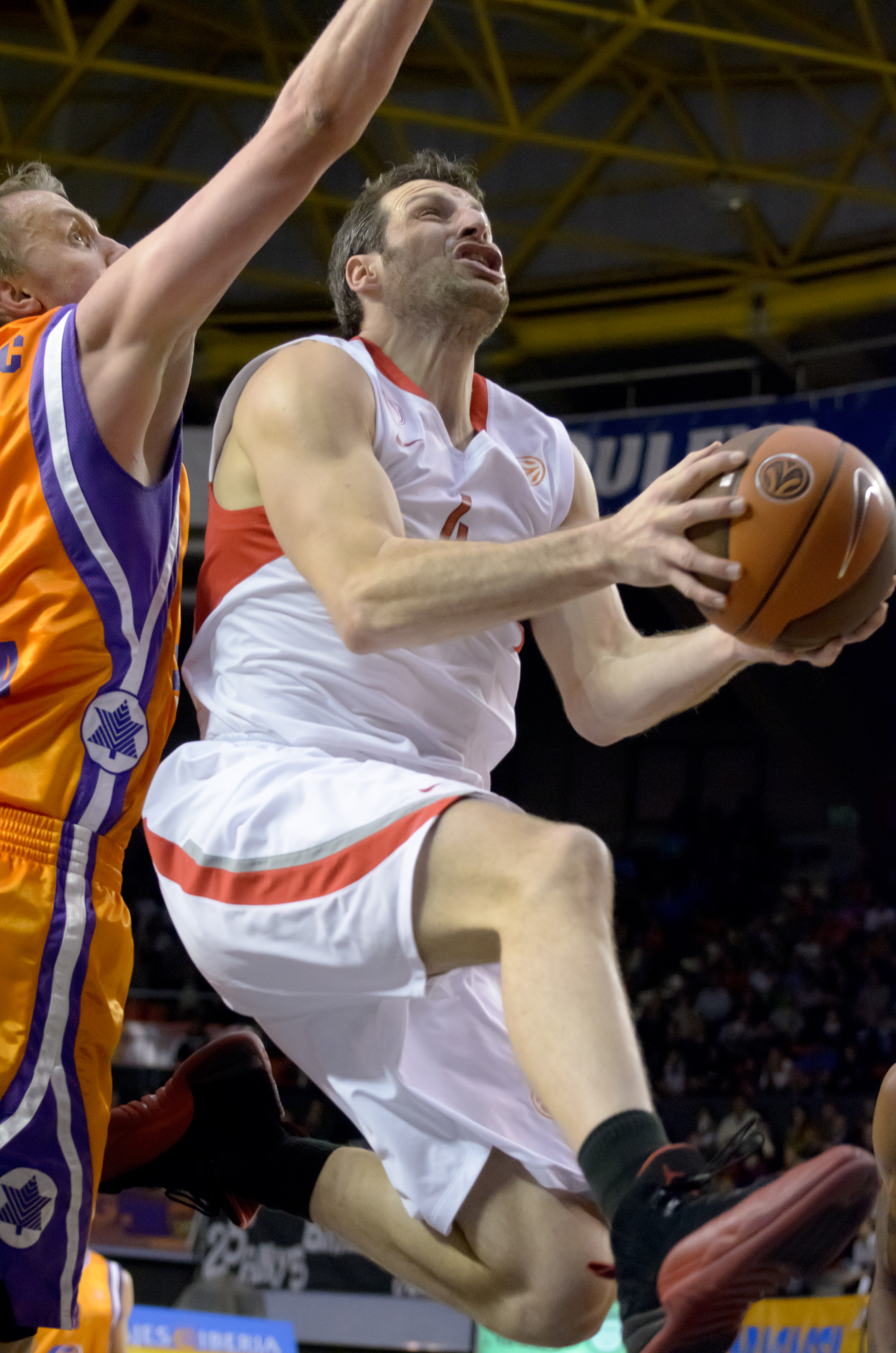
- Papaloukas with Olympiacos Piraeus in February 2011

Personal information
- Born: 8 May 1977 (age 49) Athens, Greece
- Listed height: 6 ft 7 in (2.01 m)
- Listed weight: 225 lb (102 kg)

Career information
- Playing career: 1995–2013
- Position: Point guard / shooting guard
- Number: 4, 44, 6, 5, 10

Career history
- 1995–1997: Ampelokipoi
- 1997–1999: Dafni Athens
- 1999–2001: Panionios
- 2001–2002: Olympiacos
- 2002–2008: CSKA Moscow
- 2008–2011: Olympiacos
- 2011–2012: Maccabi Tel Aviv
- 2012–2013: CSKA Moscow

Career highlights
- FIBA Europe Men's Player of the Year (2006); 2× EuroLeague champion (2006, 2008); EuroLeague Legend (2013); EuroLeague 25th Anniversary Team (2025); 50 Greatest EuroLeague Contributors (2008); EuroLeague 2000–2010 All-Decade Team (2010); EuroLeague MVP (2007); EuroLeague Final Four MVP (2006); 2× All-EuroLeague First Team (2006, 2007); 2× All-EuroLeague Second Team (2008, 2009); 2× EuroLeague assists leader (2007, 2009); 101 Greats of European Basketball (2018); FIBA EuroStar (2007); VTB United League champion (2013); ABA League champion (2012); 5× Russian League champion (2003–2008); Israeli Super League champion (2012); 3× Greek Cup winner (2002, 2010, 2011); 3× Russian Cup winner (2004–2007); Israeli State Cup winner (2012); 3× Russian League MVP (2005–2007); Russian Cup MVP (2006); 2× Greek League assists leader (2001, 2009); 5× Greek All-Star (2001, 2002, 2009–2011); Greek League Hall of Fame (2022)
Medals
Event	1st	2nd	3rd
FIBA World Cup	0	1	0
FIBA Stanković World Cup	1	0	0
FIBA EuroBasket	1	0	0
Total	2	1	0
Men's basketball
Representing Greece
FIBA World Cup
Silver medal – second place	2006 Japan	
FIBA Stanković World Cup
Gold medal – first place	2006 China	
FIBA EuroBasket
Gold medal – first place	2005 Serbia & Montenegro	

Theodoros Papaloukas (Greek: Θεόδωρος Παπαλουκάς; born 8 May 1977), commonly known as Theo Papaloukas, is a retired Greek professional basketball player. He was selected to the All-EuroLeague Team four times, was a member of the EuroLeague 2000–2010 All-Decade Team, and was named one of the 50 greatest EuroLeague contributors in 2008. A legendary figure in European basketball, he was renowned for his ability to come off the bench and immediately dominate the game. In 2013, he received the sport’s highest European honor when he was named a EuroLeague Legend in recognition of his career achievements.

Papaloukas started his career in 1995, with his local club of Ampelokipoi, before being transferred two years later to Dafni, and then to Panionios in 1999. His performances with the latter earned him a transfer to EuroLeague powerhouse Olympiacos, where in 2002, he won his first title, the Greek Cup. One year later, he moved to Moscow for CSKA, the club that he would help to regain its past glory. After making a minimal impact during his first two seasons in the Russian capital, he evolved into a major contributor to CSKA's success, playing as a sixth man in the 2004–05 season, both in the EuroLeague and the Russian Super League A.

In 2006, Papaloukas led CSKA to their first EuroLeague title in thirty-five years, and thus earning an All-EuroLeague First Team selection and the EuroLeague Final Four MVP award in the process. The following year, he cemented his status as a EuroLeague competition icon, after being named the EuroLeague MVP, before falling short of a second straight EuroLeague title in the championship's final against Panathinaikos. In 2008, he won his second EuroLeague title with CSKA, in what would be his last year in Moscow. In the summer of 2008, Papaloukas returned to Olympiacos, and with them he reached another two EuroLeague Final Fours, thereby giving him a then record of eight consecutive EuroLeague Final Four appearances, a record he shared at the time with his former teammate J.R. Holden. On 12 December 2013 he was honored with a EuroLeague Basketball Legend Award.

Papaloukas helped lead the Greece men's national basketball team to a title, EuroBasket 2005, and a silver medal in 2006 FIBA World Championship. He was elected to the All-Tournament Team in both competitions. Papaloukas took part in two Olympic tournaments, in 2004 and 2008, with Greece finishing in their personal all-time best fifth position on both occasions. In 2006, he was named the FIBA Europe Men's Player of the Year.

== Professional career ==
=== Early years ===
A native of Athens, Greece, Papaloukas began his big career at the small local Athens junior team Ethnikos Ellinoroson. He then played for another small, but at the time rising club, called Ampelokipoi, with whom he began his pro career in 1995. He then transferred to Dafni of the Greek 2nd Division in 1997, and transferred again two years later to Panionios, a traditional basketball club of the top-tier level Greek Basket League. With Dafni, Papaloukas won the Greek 2nd Division title, and the Greek 2nd Division Player of the Year award, in the 1998–99 season.

In 2001, Papaloukas finally moved to Olympiacos, a long-time Greek League power, as well as one of the perennial contenders in the EuroLeague. With Olympiacos, he led the Greek Basket League in assists in the 2000–01 and 2001–02 seasons. After the 2001–02 season, he left Olympiacos, and moved to another EuroLeague powerhouse, the Russian Super League A club CSKA Moscow, in 2002.

=== CSKA Moscow ===
After three disappointing years, at the club level, Papaloukas was a main factor helping the team win the 2005–06 EuroLeague title, the club's first EuroLeague title in 35 years, with a clutch performance in the 2006 Final Four - 19 points in the semifinal against FC Barcelona, and another 18 points at the final against the then back-to-back European champions, Maccabi Tel Aviv, which led to him being awarded him the Final Four MVP award; after he was also named the best point guard of the EuroLeague for that season. Alongside him on the All-EuroLeague First Team, were the best shooting guard, Juan Carlos Navarro of Barça, the best small forward, Anthony Parker of Maccabi (the 2005–06 EuroLeague MVP), the best power forward, Luis Scola of TAU Cerámica, and the best center, Nikola Vujčić of Maccabi.

In 2007, Papaloukas was voted the EuroLeague MVP of 2006–07 EuroLeague season. CSKA advanced to the final against Panathinaikos, which was held on the Greens' home court, the Athens Olympic Indoor Hall (which had been chosen as the site more than a year in advance). Panathinaikos won the game, by a score of 93–91, in a very exciting game. Papaloukas scored 23 points and dished out 8 assists, but a number of sportswriters intimated that he did not receive adequate support from his CSKA teammates, and thus his team lost the final. Papaloukas was also a key member of CSKA's 2007–08 EuroLeague championship team.

Papaloukas was then pursued in free agency by the NBA clubs the Boston Celtics, Los Angeles Lakers, Milwaukee Bucks, and the Miami Heat to fill their point guard spot. However, on 7 July 2007 Greek newspapers reported that Papaloukas agreed to a newly structured 3-year contract with CSKA, worth €10.5 million net income.

=== Olympiacos ===
On 20 June 2008, one year after his contract extension with CSKA, Papaloukas used an option to leave his contract with no buyout to sign a three-year contract with Olympiacos with an annual salary of €3.5 million net income.

In the first two years of his contract, he helped Olympiacos reach the EuroLeague Final Four, averaging 8 points and 5.2 assists in the EuroLeague 2008–09 season, and 7.4 points and 5.1 assists in the EuroLeague 2009–10 season. In the third, and last, year of his contract, the team failed to advance to the EuroLeague Final Four, losing 3 games to 1 to Montepaschi Siena in the EuroLeague quarterfinal playoffs, despite having the home court advantage.

=== Maccabi Tel Aviv ===
On 13 August 2011 Papaloukas signed a contract with the Israeli team Maccabi Tel Aviv, the finalists of the 2010–11 EuroLeague. In Macccabi, Papaloukas didn't get much playing-time, averaging only 9.1 minutes per game in the EuroLeague, and playing in only 8 Israeli Super League 2011–12 season games. The shortage of playing-time led to his release, after only one disappointing season with the yellows.

=== Back to CSKA Moscow ===
In December 2012, Papaloukas was invited to a tryout with CSKA Moscow. He was signed by the team, and then officially returned to the court in a EuroLeague game against Anadolu Efes, on 28 December 2012. After the end of the 2013 EuroLeague Final Four in London, he announced his retirement from playing professional basketball, effective at the end of the season.

== National team career ==
Papaloukas was part of the core element of the Greece men's national basketball team. He played at the following EuroBaskets: EuroBasket 2001 in Turkey, EuroBasket 2003 in Sweden, EuroBasket 2005 in Serbia and Montenegro, and EuroBasket 2007 in Spain.

Papaloukas, who was already well-established in European basketball as a result of appearances in three consecutive EuroLeague Final Fours with CSKA Moscow, achieved an acclaimed position among the elite of European basketball at the EuroBasket 2005 in Serbia and Montenegro. After a series of mediocre performances in the first round, he led Greece to a victory over the Russian National Basketball Team in the quarterfinals, and orchestrated a major comeback against the French National Basketball Team in the semifinal, when Greece was down 7 points with 47 seconds left on the clock.

In the final against the German National Basketball Team, led by the NBA All-Star Dirk Nowitzki, Papaloukas scored 22 points, leading Greece to its second European title, eighteen years after its first win at the EuroBasket 1987. As such, Papaloukas was selected to the All-Tournament Team of the EuroBasket 2005, along with fellow Greek team player Dimitris Diamantidis, Spanish National Basketball Team shooting guard Juan Carlos Navarro, French National Team swingman and NBA player Boris Diaw, and Nowitzki, who also claimed the MVP title.

Papaloukas also joined the elite club of players who have achieved the European title at both the national team and club levels during the same year, as he won the EuroLeague title with CSKA at the Final Four in Prague on 28–30 April 2006.

Papaloukas climbed to the second position of global basketball as he, along with his fellow Greek team players, drove Greece to the final of the 2006 FIBA World Championship in Japan, losing there in the final to the Spanish National Basketball Team. The win of the Greece national team over Team USA in the semifinal, by a score of 101–95, had Papaloukas with 12 assists, 8 points and 5 rebounds. He also earned a place on the All-Tournament Team, which also included the tournament MVP Pau Gasol of Spain, Gasol's teammate Jorge Garbajosa, Carmelo Anthony of Team USA, and Manu Ginóbili of Argentina.

His most formidable personal recognition came on 26 January 2007, when he was voted by fans and journalists as the FIBA Europe Men's Player of the Year for 2006, topping the likes of Nowitzki, Gasol, and Tony Parker. In the summer of 2008, Papaloukas became the captain of Greece's national team for the 2008 Olympic Games. It was also the last time he ever played for Greece's national team.

== Player profile ==
Papaloukas was a 6’7”, 225‑lb point guard. His size, command of the pick-and-roll, feel for the game and performances in high pressure situations have been highlighted in assessments of his career, and he is frequently listed among most accomplished players in EuroLeague history.

Papaloukas was selected to the EuroLeague’s 50 Greatest EuroLeague Contributors list in 2008.

== Post-playing career ==
After he retired from playing professional basketball, Papaloukas was named a EuroLeague Legend, and also an official ambassador of the EuroLeague. He also became a member of the EuroLeague's official technical rules committee.

== Personal ==
His family hails from Prousos Evritania.

== Career statistics ==
Legend
GP	Games played	GS	Games started	MPG	Minutes per game
FG%	Field-goal percentage	3P%	3-point field-goal percentage	FT%	Free-throw percentage
RPG	Rebounds per game	APG	Assists per game	SPG	Steals per game
BPG	Blocks per game	PPG	Points per game	PIR	Performance index rating
**Bold**	Career high

=== EuroLeague ===
†	Denotes season in which Papaloukas won the EuroLeague
*	Led the league

Year	Team	GP	GS	MPG	FG%	3P%	FT%	RPG	APG	SPG	BPG	PPG	PIR
2001–02	Olympiacos	19	**13**	**26.9**	.468	.333	.671	2.9	4.0	**2.0**	.2	8.4	10.2
2002–03	CSKA Moscow	21	1	16.4	.453	.280	.630	2.0	3.4	1.1	.0	4.7	8.0
2003–04	CSKA Moscow	21	0	17.4	.453	.172	.782	1.7	2.7	1.5	.1	6.3	8.5
2004–05	CSKA Moscow	23	0	18.5	.611	**.412**	.679	2.3	3.8	1.3	.1	7.6	11.3
2005–06†	CSKA Moscow	24	0	22.7	.549	.275	.736	3.1	4.0	1.8	**.3**	9.3	13.9
2006–07	CSKA Moscow	**25***	3	24.4	.578	.341	.716	**3.2**	**5.4***	1.7	.2	**9.8**	**15.3**
2007–08†	CSKA Moscow	23	0	21.8	.500	.242	.690	2.7	4.6	1.2	.0	7.7	11.2
2008–09	Olympiacos	22	2	25.1	**.612**	.368	.636	2.7	5.2*	1.1	.0	8.0	11.5
2009–10	Olympiacos	19	0	24.4	.561	.351	.643	2.1	5.1	1.3	.1	7.4	10.4
2010–11	Olympiacos	18	0	21.4	.470	.214	.609	2.6	3.8	1.6	.0	5.4	8.1
2011–12	Maccabi	20	1	9.6	.435	.333	.720	1.1	1.6	.6	.0	3.0	3.5
2012–13	CSKA Moscow	17	0	11.1	.379	.333	**.786**	1.5	2.3	.5	.1	2.2	3.5
Career		252	20	20.1	.526	.300	.694	2.4	3.9	1.3	.1	6.8	9.9

== Awards and accomplishments ==
=== Pro clubs ===
- Greek 2nd Division Champion: (1999)
- Eurobasket.com's Greek 2nd Division Player of the Year: (1999)
- 3× Greek League assists leader: (2001, 2002, 2009)
- 5× Greek League All-Star: (2001, 2002, 2009, 2010, 2011)
- 3× Greek Cup Winner: (2002, 2010, 2011)
- 7× Russian League Champion: (2003–08, 2013)
- 3× Russian Cup Winner: (2005–07)
- 3× Russian League Player of the Year (2005, 2006, 2007)
- Russian Cup MVP: (2006)
- 2× EuroLeague Champion: (2006, 2008)
- 4× All-EuroLeague Team: (2006, 2007, 2008, 2009)
  - 2× All-EuroLeague First Team: (2006, 2007)
  - 2× All-EuroLeague Second Team: (2008, 2009)
- EuroLeague Final Four MVP: (2006)
- Triple Crown Champion: (2006)
- FIBA Europe Men's Player of the Year: (2006)
- All-Europe Player of the Year: (2006)
- 2× EuroLeague assists leader: (2007, 2009)
- EuroLeague MVP: (2007)
- EuroLeague Finals Top Scorer: (2007)
- 50 Greatest EuroLeague Contributors: (2008)
- EuroLeague 2000–2010 All-Decade Team: (2010)
- Israeli State Cup Winner: (2012)
- Adriatic League Champion: (2012)
- Israeli Super League Champion: (2012)
- VTB United League Champion: (2013)
- EuroLeague Basketball Legend: (2013)
- 101 Greats of European Basketball: (2018)
- Greek Basket League Hall of Fame: (2022)

=== Greek national team ===
- 7× Acropolis Tournament Champion: (2000, 2002, 2003, 2005, 2006, 2007, 2008)
- EuroBasket 2005: Gold
- EuroBasket All-Tournament Team: (2005)
- 2006 FIBA Stanković World Cup: Gold
- 2006 FIBA World Championship: Silver
- 2006 FIBA World Championship: All-Tournament Team
- FIBA EuroStar: (2007)
