= 2007 Euroleague Final Four =

Basketball tournament

- Season: 2006–07 Euroleague

Tournament details
- Arena: Olympic Indoor Hall; Marousi, Athens, Greece
- Dates: May 4 – May 6, 2007

Final positions
- Champions: (Greece) Panathinaikos (4th title)
- Runners-up: (Russia) CSKA Moscow
- Third place: (Spain) Unicaja Málaga
- Fourth place: (Spain) Tau Cerámica

Awards and statistics
- MVP: (Greece) Dimitris Diamantidis

The 2007 Euroleague Final Four was the concluding Euroleague Final Four tournament of the 2006–07 Euroleague season. It was held on May 4–6, 2007. All of the games were held at the O.A.C.A. Olympic Indoor Hall, in Marousi, Athens, Greece.

== Bracket ==
Semifinals; May 4
(Greece) Panathinaikos	67
(Spain) Tau Cerámica	53
(Spain) Unicaja Málaga	50
(Russia) CSKA Moscow	62

Final; May 6
(Greece) Panathinaikos	93
(Russia) CSKA Moscow	91
Third-place
(Spain) Unicaja Málaga	76
(Spain) Tau Cerámica	74

== Semifinals ==
=== Semifinal A ===
May 4

(Report)

Panathinaikos (Greece)	67–53	(Spain) Tau Cerámica
Scoring by quarter: 18-9, 17-12, 12-14, 20-18
Pts: Batiste, Bečirović 15; Rebs: Batiste 12; Asts: Diamantidis 4		Pts: Erdoğan 11; Rebs: Peker 8 Asts: Prigioni 2

Olympic Indoor Hall, Athens
Attendance: 18,363
Referees: Lamonica (ITA), Belosevic (SRB), Ryzhyk (UKR)

=== Semifinal B ===
May 4

(Report)

Unicaja Málaga (Spain)	50–62	(Russia) CSKA Moscow
Scoring by quarter: 15-18, 9-15, 20-11, 6-18
Pts: Cabezas 13; Rebs: Jiménez 8 Asts: three players 3		Pts: Langdon 13; Rebs: Andersen 9 Asts: Papaloukas 4

Olympic Indoor Hall, Athens
Attendance: 18,363
Referees: Pitsilikas (GRE), Pukl (SLO), Sahin (ITA)

== Third-place game ==
May 6

(Report)

Unicaja Málaga (Spain)	76–74	(Spain) Tau Cerámica
Scoring by quarter: 16-15, 19-25, 16-21, 25-13
Pts: Tušek 18; Rebs: Tušek, Piétrus 5 Asts: Sánchez 8		Pts: Rakočević 16; Rebs: Splitter 8 Asts: Vidal 5

Olympic Indoor Hall, Athens
Attendance: 18,363
Referees: Pitsilikas (GRE), Sahin (ITA), Viator (FRA)

== Final ==
Panathinaikos played its 5th European final, while CSKA played in its 9th final. Željko Obradović won his sixth EuroLeague title, which made him the most successful coach in league history.

May 6, 2007	Panathinaikos (Greece)	93–91	(Russia) CSKA Moscow	Olympic Indoor Hall, Athens
20:30 (CET)	Scoring by quarter: 18–17, 28–19, 19–21, 28–34
	Pts: Šiškauskas 20; Rebs: Batiste 5 Asts: Šiškauskas 5	Boxscore	Pts: Papaloukas 23; Rebs: Andersen 6 Asts: Papaloukas 8	Attendance: 18,363; Referees: Mitjana (ESP), Lamonica (ITA), Belosevic (SRB)

Starters:			Pts	Reb	Ast
PG	13	(Greece) Dimitris Diamantidis	15	3	3
SG	10	(Greece) Nikos Chatzivrettas	10	4	1
SF	9	(Lithuania) Ramūnas Šiškauskas	20	4	5
PF	8	(United States) Mike Batiste	12	5	1
C	15	(Serbia) Dejan Tomašević	16	3	0
Reserves:					
F/C	11	(Greece) Dimos Dikoudis	2	3	0
G	7	(Slovenia) Sani Bečirovič	6	0	1
PG	18	(Serbia) Miloš Vujanić	12	0	0
SF	4	(Greece) Fragiskos Alvertis	0	0	0
G	5	(United States) Tony Delk	0	0	0
F/C	12	(Greece) Kostas Tsartsaris	0	0	0
C	19	(Lithuania) Robertas Javtokas	DNP		
Head coach:
(Basketball Federation of Serbia) Željko Obradović

Panathinaikos	CSKA

Starters:			Pts	Reb	Ast
PG	10	(Russia) J.R. Holden	11	1	0
SG	21	(United States) Trajan Langdon	16	1	0
SF	4	(Greece) Theo Papaloukas	23	1	8
PF	13	(Australia) David Andersen	4	6	0
C	8	(Slovenia) Matjaž Smodiš	18	3	0
Reserves:					
C	14	(Russia) Aleksey Savrasenko	4	2	0
G/F	17	(Venezuela) Óscar Torres	9	4	1
PG	18	(Russia) Anton Ponkrashov	0	0	0
C	22	(Belgium) Tomas Van Den Spiegel	6	0	0
PG	11	(Russia) Zakhar Pashutin	0	0	0
G/F	5	(Russia) Nikita Kurbanov	DNP		
SG	9	(United States) David Vanterpool	DNP		
Head coach:
(Italian Basketball Federation) Ettore Messina

- Team captains (C): (Greece) Fragiskos Alvertis (Panathinaikos) and (Russia) Zakhar Pashutin (CSKA Moscow)

== Awards ==
=== Euroleague Final Four MVP ===
- (Greece) Dimitris Diamantidis ( (Greece) Panathinaikos)

=== Euroleague Finals Top Scorer ===
- (Greece) Theo Papaloukas ( (Russia) CSKA Moscow)
