= 2005–06 Euroleague =

Sports season

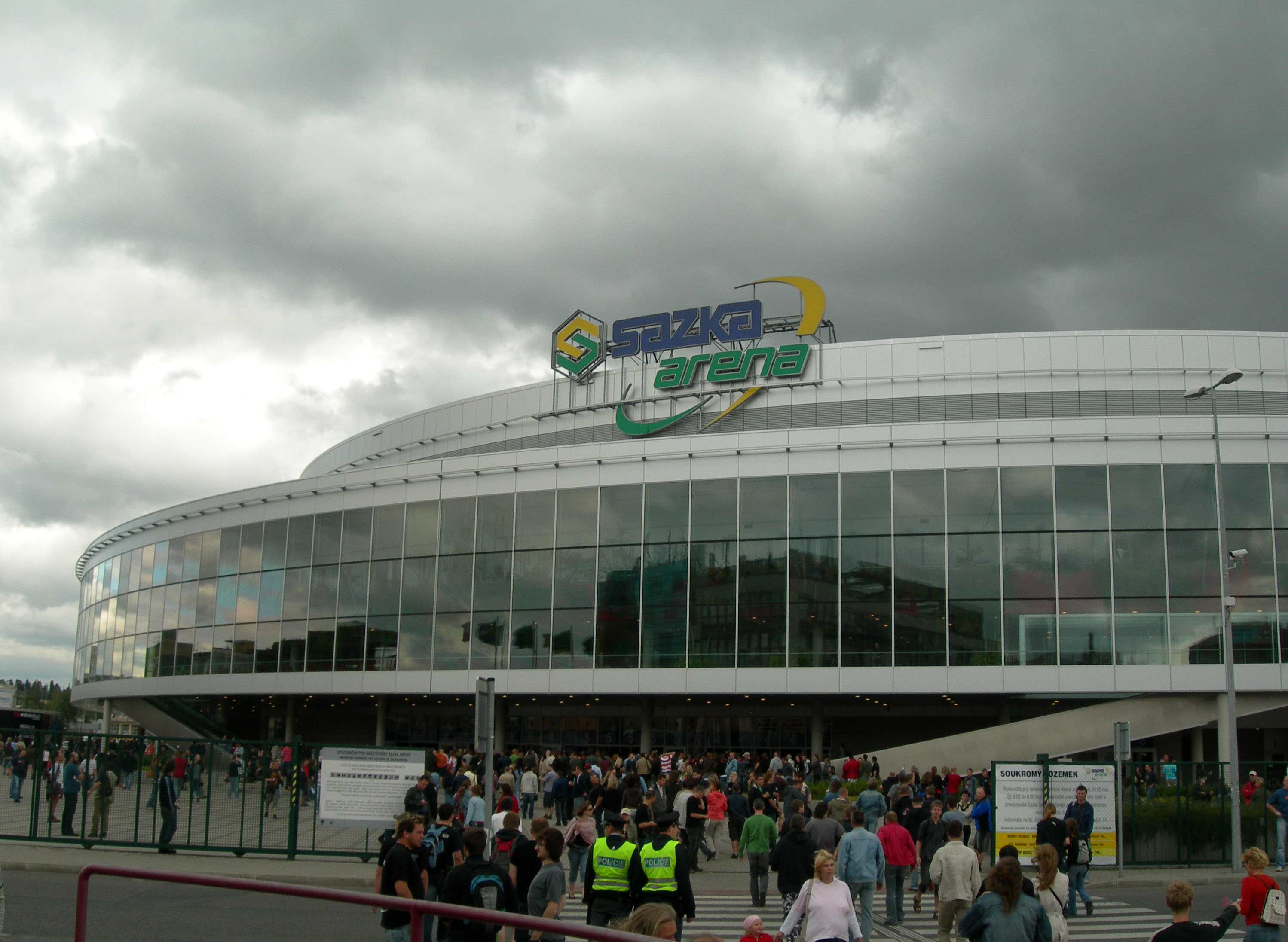
- The Sazka Arena in Prague hosted the Final Four
- Season: 2005–06
- Teams: 24

Regular season
- Season MVP: (United States) Anthony Parker

Finals
- Champions: (Russia) CSKA Moscow (5th title)
- Runners-up: (Israel) Maccabi Elite
- Semi-finalists: (Spain) Tau Cerámica
- Fourth place: (Spain) Winterthur FC Barcelona
- Finals MVP: (Greece) Theo Papaloukas

Statistical leaders
Points	(United States) Drew Nicholas	18.5
Rebounds	(Turkey) Mirsad Türkcan	8.9
Assists	(Argentina) Pablo Prigioni	6.2
Index Rating	(United States) Anthony Parker	20.5

The 2005–06 Euroleague was the 6th season of the professional basketball competition for elite clubs throughout Europe, organised by Euroleague Basketball Company, and it was the 49th season of the premier competition for European men's clubs overall.

The 2005–06 season featured 24 competing teams from 13 countries. The Final Four was held at the Sazka Arena in Prague, Czech Republic on April 30, 2006. CSKA Moscow defeat the defending champions, Maccabi Elite by a score of 73–69 in the final.

== Team allocation ==
=== Distribution ===
The table below shows the default access list.

	Teams entering in this round
Regular season (24 teams)	14 teams with 3-year licences; 2 best-placed teams from: Spain; The champion teams from: France; Germany; Greece; Israel; Italy; Poland; Serbia and Montenegro; 1 Wild card
Top 16 (16 teams)	3 group winners from the regular season; 3 group runners-up from the regular season; 3 group third-placed teams from the regular season; 3 group fourth-placed teams from the regular season; 3 group fifth-placed teams from the regular season; 1 group sixth placed team from the regular season
Quarterfinals (8 teams)	4 group winners from the top 16; 4 group runners-up from the top 16

=== Teams ===
The labels in the parentheses show how each team qualified for the place of its starting round (TH: EuroLeague title holders)

- Licensed clubs: 3-year licence
- 1st, 2nd, etc.: League position after Playoffs
- WC: Wild card

Regular season
Licensed clubs
(Italy) Climamio Bologna (1st)	(Spain) Winterthur Barcelona (5th)	(Russia) CSKA Moscow (1st)
(Italy) Benetton Treviso (3rd)	(Turkey) Efes Pilsen (1st)	(Slovenia) Union Olimpija (1st)
(Italy) Montepaschi Siena (5th)	(Turkey) Ülker (3rd)	
(Greece) AEK (2nd)	(Croatia) Cibona VIP (2nd)	
(Greece) Olympiacos (8th)	(France) Pau-Orthez (7th)	
(Spain) Tau Cerámica (2nd)	(Lithuania) Žalgiris (1st)	
Associated clubs
(Spain) Real Madrid (1st)	(France) Strasbourg (1st)	(Poland) Prokom Trefl Sopot (1st)
(Spain) Unicaja Málaga (3rd)	(Lithuania) Lietuvos Rytas (2nd)	(Serbia and Montenegro) Partizan Pivara MB (1st)
(Greece) Panathinaikos (1st)	(Germany) CHP Bamberg (1st)	
(Italy) Armani Jeans Milano (2nd)	(Israel) Maccabi Elite (1st)^{TH}	

== Regular season ==
The first phase was a regular season, in which the competing teams were drawn into three groups, each containing eight teams. Each team played every other team in its group at home and away, resulting in 14 games for each team in the first stage. The top 5 teams in each group and the best sixth-placed team advanced to the next round. The complete list of tiebreakers was provided in the lead-in to the Regular Season results.

If one or more clubs were level on won–lost record, tiebreakers were applied in the following order:

1. Head-to-head record in matches between the tied clubs
2. Overall point difference in games between the tied clubs
3. Overall point difference in all group matches (first tiebreaker if tied clubs were not in the same group)
4. Points scored in all group matches
5. Sum of quotients of points scored and points allowed in each group match

3–5 are used to break ties between 6th place teams

Key to colors
Top five places in each group, plus highest-ranked sixth-place team, advanced to Top 16

=== Group A ===
	Team	Pld	W	L	PF	PA	Diff
1.	(Spain) Tau Cerámica	14	11	3	1130	976	+154
2.	(Italy) Climamio Bologna	14	10	4	1114	989	+125
3.	(Lithuania) Žalgiris	14	9	5	1065	1037	+28
4.	(Italy) Benetton Treviso	14	8	6	1142	1134	+8
5.	(Germany) CHP Bamberg	14	7	7	975	1023	-48
6.	(Slovenia) Union Olimpija	14	5	9	1059	1080	-21
7.	(France) Strasbourg	14	3	11	972	1058	-86
8.	(Greece) AEK	14	3	11	940	1100	-160

=== Group B ===
	Team	Pld	W	L	PF	PA	Diff
1.	(Israel) Maccabi Elite	14	9	5	1220	1135	+85
2.	(Turkey) Efes Pilsen	14	9	5	1025	995	+30
3.	(Lithuania) Lietuvos Rytas	14	8	6	1068	1012	+58
4.	(Spain) Winterthur FC Barcelona	14	7	7	1079	1021	+56
5.	(Greece) Olympiacos	14	7	7	1085	1059	+26
6.	(Croatia) Cibona VIP	14	6	8	917	1054	-137
7.	(Poland) Prokom Trefl Sopot	14	5	9	997	1066	-69
8.	(Italy) Armani Jeans Milano	14	5	9	1036	1085	-49

=== Group C ===
	Team	Pld	W	L	PF	PA	Diff
1.	(Spain) Unicaja Málaga	14	12	2	1100	1015	+85
2.	(Greece) Panathinaikos	14	12	2	1219	1063	+156
3.	(Russia) CSKA Moscow	14	10	4	1116	950	+166
4.	(Spain) Real Madrid	14	7	7	1012	1004	+8
5.	(Turkey) Ülker	14	5	9	1000	1055	-55
6.	(Italy) Montepaschi Siena	14	4	10	1001	1055	54
7.	(France) Pau-Orthez	14	4	10	971	1103	-132
8.	(Serbia and Montenegro) Partizan Pivara MB	14	2	12	978	1152	-174

== Top 16 ==
The surviving teams were divided into four groups of four teams each, and again a round robin system was adopted, resulting in 6 games each, with the two top teams advancing to the quarterfinals. Tiebreakers were identical to those used in the Regular Season.

The draw was held in accordance with Euroleague rules.

The teams were placed into four pools, as follows:

Level 1: The three group winners, plus the top-ranked second-place team

- Unicaja Málaga, Tau Cerámica, Maccabi Elite, Panathinaikos

Level 2: The remaining second-place teams, plus the top two third-place teams

- Climamio Bologna, Efes Pilsen, CSKA Moscow, Žalgiris

Level 3: The remaining third-place team, plus the three fourth-place teams

- Lietuvos Rytas, Benetton Treviso, FC Barcelona, Real Madrid

Level 4: The fifth-place teams, plus the top ranked sixth-place team

- Olympiacos, Brose Bamberg, Ülker, Cibona

Each Top 16 group included one team from each pool. The draw was conducted under the following restrictions:

1. No more than two teams from the same Regular Season group could be placed in the same Top 16 group.
2. No more than two teams from the same country could be placed in the same Top 16 group.
3. If there was a conflict between these two restrictions, (1) would receive priority.

Another draw was held to determine the order of fixtures. In the case of two teams from the same city in the Top 16 (Panathinaikos and Olympiacos, Efes Pilsen and Ülker) they were scheduled so that every week, only one team would be at home.

Key to colors
Top two places in each group advanced to quarterfinals

=== Group D ===
	Team	Pld	W	L	PF	PA	Diff
1.	(Spain) Winterthur FC Barcelona	6	5	1	448	434	+14
2.	(Greece) Olympiacos	6	4	2	490	450	+40
3.	(Spain) Unicaja Málaga	6	3	3	447	435	+12
4.	(Lithuania) Žalgiris	6	0	6	425	491	−66

=== Group E ===
	Team	Pld	W	L	PF	PA	Diff
1.	(Israel) Maccabi Elite	6	5	1	491	448	+43
2.	(Spain) Real Madrid	6	4	2	446	412	+34
3.	(Italy) Climamio Bologna	6	2	4	469	477	−8
4.	(Turkey) Ülker	6	1	5	415	484	−69

=== Group F ===
	Team	Pld	W	L	PF	PA	Diff
1.	(Russia) CSKA Moscow	6	5	1	441	391	+50
2.	(Spain) Tau Cerámica	6	4	2	453	422	+31
3.	(Lithuania) Lietuvos Rytas	6	3	3	422	427	−5
4.	(Germany) CHP Bamberg	6	0	6	374	450	−76

=== Group G ===
	Team	Pld	W	L	PF	PA	Diff
1.	(Greece) Panathinaikos	6	3	3	447	419	+28
2.	(Turkey) Efes Pilsen	6	3	3	446	447	−1
3.	(Italy) Benetton Treviso	6	3	3	476	488	−12
4.	(Croatia) Cibona VIP	6	3	3	458	473	−15

== Quarterfinals ==
Each quarterfinal was a best-of-three series between a first-place team in the Top 16 and a second-place team from a different group, with the first-place team receiving home advantage.

Team 1	Agg.	Team 2	1st leg	2nd leg	3rd leg
Winterthur FC Barcelona (Spain)	2–1	(Spain) Real Madrid	72–58	78–84	76-70
Maccabi Elite (Israel)	2–1	(Greece) Olympiacos	87–78	70–76	77-73
CSKA Moscow (Russia)	2–0	(Turkey) Efes Pilsen	66–57	75–71	
Panathinaikos (Greece)	1–2	(Spain) Tau Cerámica	84–72	79–85	71-74

== Final four ==
=== Semifinals ===
April 28, Sazka Arena, Prague

Team 1	Score	Team 2
Winterthur FC Barcelona (Spain)	75–84	(Russia) CSKA Moscow
Maccabi Elite (Israel)	85–70	(Spain) Tau Cerámica

=== 3rd place game ===
April 30, Sazka Arena, Prague

Team 1	Score	Team 2
Winterthur FC Barcelona (Spain)	82–87	(Spain) Tau Cerámica

=== Final ===
April 30, Sazka Arena, Prague

Team 1	Score	Team 2
CSKA Moscow (Russia)	73–69	(Israel) Maccabi Elite

2005–06 Euroleague
Champions

CSKA Moscow
5th Title

=== Final standings ===
	Team
	(Russia) CSKA Moscow
2nd place, silver medalist(s)	(Israel) Maccabi Elite
3rd place, bronze medalist(s)	(Spain) Tau Cerámica
	(Spain) Winterthur FC Barcelona

=== Final Four 2006 MVP ===
(Greece) Theodoros Papaloukas (CSKA Moscow)

== Individual statistics ==
=== Rating ===
Rank	Name	Team	Games	Rating	PIR
1.	(United States) Anthony Parker	(Israel) Maccabi Elite	25	513	20.52
2.	(Spain) Jorge Garbajosa	(Spain) Unicaja Málaga	18	348	19.33
3.	(Argentina) Luis Scola	(Spain) Tau Cerámica	25	470	18.80

=== Points ===
Rank	Name	Team	Games	Rating	PPG
1.	(United States) Drew Nicholas	(Italy) Benetton Treviso	20	369	18.45
2.	(United States) Scoonie Penn	(Croatia) Cibona	20	341	17.05
3.	(United States) Louis Bullock	(Spain) Real Madrid	20	316	15.80

=== Rebounds ===
Rank	Name	Team	Games	Rating	RPG
1.	(Turkey) Mirsad Türkcan	(Turkey) Ülker	16	143	8.94
2.	(Lithuania) Darjuš Lavrinovič	(Lithuania) Žalgiris	20	166	8.30
3.	(Lithuania) Robertas Javtokas	(Lithuania) Lietuvos Rytas	20	164	8.20

=== Assists ===
Rank	Name	Team	Games	Rating	APG
1.	(Argentina) Pablo Prigioni	(Spain) Tau Cerámica	25	156	6.24
2.	(United States) Tyus Edney	(Greece) Olympiacos	23	103	4.48
3.	(Georgia (country)) Shammond Williams	(Spain) Winterthur FC Barcelona	25	107	4.28

=== Other Stats ===
Category	Name	Team	Games	Stat
Steals per game	(United States) Jeff Trepagnier	(Turkey) Ülker	20	3.05
Blocks per game	(Lithuania) Darjuš Lavrinovič	(Lithuania) Žalgiris	20	2.10
Turnovers per game	(Italy) Massimo Bulleri	(Italy) Armani Jeans Milano	14	3.79
Fouls drawn per game	(United States) Scoonie Penn	(Croatia) Cibona	20	5.80
Minutes per game	(Israel) Yotam Halperin	(Slovenia) Union Olimpija	14	36:04
2FG%	(Lithuania) Tomas Masiulis	(Poland) Prokom Trefl	14	0.666
3FG%	(Italy) Giacomo Galanda	(Italy) Armani Jeans Milano	14	0.536
FT%	(Greece) Nikos Chatzis	(Greece) Olympiacos	20	0.969

=== Game highs ===
Category	Name	Team	Stat
Rating	(United States) Spencer Nelson	(Germany) Brose Bamberg	48
Points	(Argentina) Luis Scola	(Spain) Tau Cerámica	36
Rebounds	(United States) Spencer Nelson	(Germany) Brose Bamberg	20
Assists	(North Macedonia) Vrbica Stefanov	(Turkey) Ülker	12
Assists	(United States) Lonnie Cooper	(France) Pau-Orthez	12
Steals	(United States) Jeff Trepagnier	(Turkey) Ülker	11
Blocks	(United States) Maceo Baston	(Israel) Maccabi Elite	6
Turnovers	(Serbia and Montenegro) Igor Rakočević	(Spain) Real Madrid	9
Turnovers	(Greece) Giannis Kalampokis	(Greece) AEK	9
Fouls Drawn	(Slovenia) Jaka Lakovič	(Greece) Panathinaikos	15

== Awards ==
=== Euroleague MVP ===
- (United States) Anthony Parker ( (Israel) Maccabi Elite)

=== Final Four MVP ===
- (Greece) Theodoros Papaloukas ( (Russia) CSKA Moscow)

=== Finals Top Scorer ===
- (United States) Will Solomon ( (Israel) Maccabi Tel Aviv)

=== All-Euroleague Team 2005–06 ===
Position	All-Euroleague First Team	Club Team	All-Euroleague Second Team	Club team
PG	(Greece) Theodoros Papaloukas	(Russia) CSKA Moscow	(Argentina) Pablo Prigioni	(Spain) Tau Cerámica
SG/SF	(Spain) Juan Carlos Navarro	(Spain) Winterthur FC Barcelona	(Greece) Vassilis Spanoulis	(Greece) Panathinaikos
SG/SF	(United States) Anthony Parker	(Israel) Maccabi Elite	(United States) Trajan Langdon	(Russia) CSKA Moscow
PF/C	(Argentina) Luis Scola	(Spain) Tau Cerámica	(Spain) Jorge Garbajosa	(Spain) Unicaja Málaga
PF/C	(Croatia) Nikola Vujčić	(Israel) Maccabi Elite	(Lithuania) Darjuš Lavrinovič	(Lithuania) Žalgiris

=== Best Defender ===
- (Greece) Dimitris Diamantidis ( (Greece) Panathinaikos)

=== Rising Star ===
- (Italy) Andrea Bargnani ( (Italy) Benetton Treviso)

=== Alphonso Ford Top Scorer ===
- (United States) Drew Nicholas ( (Italy) Benetton Treviso)

=== Alexander Gomelsky Coach of the Year ===
- (Italy) Ettore Messina ( (Russia) CSKA Moscow)

=== Club Executive of the Year ===
- (Russia) Sergey Kushchenko ( (Russia) CSKA Moscow)

==== Regular season ====
Game	Player	Team	Rating
1	(Serbia and Montenegro) Dejan Milojević	(Serbia and Montenegro) Partizan	33
1	(Croatia) Nikola Vujčić	(Israel) Maccabi Elite	33
2	(Greece) Vassilis Spanoulis	(Greece) Panathinaikos	32
3	(Croatia) Marko Popović	(Turkey) Efes Pilsen	31
4	(United States) Maceo Baston	(Israel) Maccabi Elite	35
5	(Serbia and Montenegro) Dejan Milojević (2)	(Serbia and Montenegro) Partizan	33
5	(United States) Lynn Greer	(France) Strasbourg	33
6	(Bosnia and Herzegovina) Haris Mujezinović	(Lithuania) Lietuvos Rytas	36
6	(United States) Anthony Parker	(Israel) Maccabi Elite	36
7	(United States) Scoonie Penn	(Croatia) Cibona	36
8	(United States) Spencer Nelson	(Germany) Brose Bamberg	48
9	(Croatia) Andrija Zizić	(Greece) Olympiacos	41
10	(United States) Mike Batiste	(Greece) Panathinaikos	33
11	(United States) Louis Bullock	(Spain) Real Madrid	34
12	(Croatia) Marko Popović (2)	(Turkey) Efes Pilsen	40
13	(United States) Tyus Edney	(Greece) Olympiacos	38
13	(Spain) Felipe Reyes	(Spain) Real Madrid	38
14	(United States) Scoonie Penn (2)	(Croatia) Cibona	37

==== Top 16 ====
Game	Player	Team	PIR
1	(United States) Anthony Parker (2)	(Israel) Maccabi Elite	39
2	(Serbia and Montenegro) Igor Rakočević	(Spain) Real Madrid	32
2	(Greece) Sofoklis Schortsanitis	(Greece) Olympiacos	32
3	(Spain) Jorge Garbajosa	(Spain) Unicaja Málaga	37
4	(United States) Maceo Baston (2)	(Israel) Maccabi Elite	28
4	(Croatia) Nikola Prkacin	(Turkey) Efes Pilsen	28
4	(United States) Antonio Granger	(Turkey) Efes Pilsen	28
5	(Serbia and Montenegro) Igor Rakočević (2)	(Spain) Real Madrid	28
6	(Bosnia and Herzegovina) Henry Domercant	(Turkey) Efes Pilsen	29
6	(United States) Maceo Baston (3)	(Israel) Maccabi Elite	29

==== Playoffs ====
Game	Player	Team	PIR
1-2	(Greece) Vassilis Spanoulis (2)	(Greece) Panathinaikos	23
3	(Greece) Michalis Kakiouzis	(Spain) Winterthur FC Barcelona	23

=== MVP of the Month ===
Month	Player	Team
November 2005	(Turkey) Kaya Peker	(Turkey) Efes Pilsen
December 2005	(Spain) Jorge Garbajosa	(Spain) Unicaja Málaga
January 2006	(Spain) Juan Carlos Navarro	(Spain) Winterthur FC Barcelona
February 2006	(United States) Tyus Edney	(Greece) Olympiacos
March 2006	(United States) Maceo Baston	(Israel) Maccabi Elite
April 2006	(United States) Trajan Langdon	(Russia) CSKA Moscow

== References and notes ==
Euroleague Competition Format
