= 1966 FIBA European Champions Cup Final Four =

Concluding tournament of basketball competition

Tournament details
- Arena: Palazzo dello Sport; Bologna, Italy
- Dates: 30 March 1966 - 1 April 1966

Final positions
- Champions: (Italy) Simmenthal Milano (1st title)
- Runners-up: (Czechoslovakia) Slavia VŠ Praha
- Third place: (Soviet Union) CSKA Moscow
- Fourth place: (Greece) AEK

Awards and statistics
- MVP: N/A

The 1966 FIBA European Champions Cup Final Four was the concluding tournament of the 1965–66 FIBA European Champions Cup, and the first FIBA European Champions Cup Final Four tournament of all time.

Simmenthal Milano won its first FIBA European Champions Cup (EuroLeague) title.

== Bracket ==
Semi-finals
(Czechoslovakia) Slavia VŠ Praha	103
(Greece) AEK	73
(Soviet Union) CSKA Moscow	57
(Italy) Simmenthal Milano	68

Final
(Czechoslovakia) Slavia VŠ Praha	72
(Italy) Simmenthal Milano	77
Third place
(Greece) AEK	62
(Soviet Union) CSKA Moscow	85

== Final standings ==
	Team
	(Italy) Simmenthal Milano
Silver medal	(Czechoslovakia) Slavia VŠ Praha
Bronze medal	(Soviet Union) CSKA Moscow
	(Greece) AEK

1965–66 FIBA European Champions Cup
Champions

Simmenthal Milano
1st title

== Awards ==
=== FIBA European Champions Cup Finals Top Scorer ===
- (Czechoslovakia) Jiří Zídek Sr. ( (Czechoslovakia) Slavia VŠ Praha)
