= EuroLeague Final Four =

European basketball championship

The EuroLeague Final Four is the final four format championship of the European-wide top-tier level EuroLeague professional club basketball competition. The Euroleague Basketball Company used the final four format for the first time in 2002, following the 2001 FIBA SuproLeague Final Four, which was the last final four held by FIBA Europe. In the original FIBA Europe competition, as seen below, the final four was used for the first time at the 1966 FIBA European Champions Cup Final Four. The final four format was used again the next year, with the 1967 FIBA European Champions Cup Final Four, but was then abandoned.

The final four finally returned as the format of choice, for the first time during its modern era, with the 1988 FIBA European Champions Cup Final Four. It is known as the Turkish Airlines EuroLeague Final Four for name sponsorship reasons. Panathinaikos has been the most successful team at the EuroLeague Final Four, since the modern final four era began in the 1987–88 season, winning the title 7 times (1996, 2000, 2002, 2007, 2009, 2011, 2024). Olympiacos are the most recent winners, having clinched their fourth Final Four title in 2026.

The EuroLeague Final Four is broadcast on TV in up to 213 countries and territories.

== History ==
=== Names of the Final Four ===
- FIBA era (1958–2001):
  - FIBA European Champions Cup Final Four (1966–1967, 1988–1991)
  - FIBA European League Final Four ("FIBA EuroLeague Final Four") (1992–1996)
  - FIBA EuroLeague Final Four (1997–2000)
  - FIBA SuproLeague Final Four (2001)
- Euroleague Basketball era (since 2000):
  - Euroleague Final Four (2002–2016)
  - EuroLeague Final Four (since 2017)

=== Historical changes ===
The first time the EuroLeague used a Final Four format to decide its league champion, was at the conclusion of the 1965–66 and 1966–67 seasons, when it held the 1966 FIBA European Champions Cup Final Four, and the 1967 FIBA European Champions Cup Final Four. Those first two final fours were won by Simmenthal Milano (1966) and Real Madrid (1967). FIBA Europe did not use the final four format again until the 1987–88 season, when it held the 1988 FIBA European Champions Cup Final Four, which was also won by Tracer Milano.

The EuroLeague Final Four has been held every year since, with FIBA Europe organizing it until 2001, and the Euroleague Basketball Company organizing it since 2002.

There were two separate competitions during the 2000–01 season. The SuproLeague, which was organized by FIBA, and the EuroLeague, which was organized by Euroleague Basketball Company. Euroleague Basketball Company's EuroLeague competition, in its inaugural year, used a playoff format, with the two professional teams from Bologna (Virtus and Fortitudo), AEK, and TAU reaching the tournament's semifinals. Virtus was the winner of the 2001 Euroleague Finals.

== EuroLeague Final Four by season ==
Year	Host city	Champion	Runner-up	Third place	Fourth place
FIBA European Champions Cup Final Four (early events)
1966	(Italy) Bologna	(Italy) Simmenthal Milano	(Czechoslovakia) Slavia VŠ Praha	(Soviet Union) CSKA Moscow	(Greece) AEK
1967	(Spain) Madrid	(Spain) Real Madrid	(Italy) Simmenthal Milano	(Czechoslovakia) Slavia VŠ Praha	(Socialist Federal Republic of Yugoslavia) AŠK Olimpija
FIBA European Champions Cup Final Four
1988	(Belgium) Ghent	(Italy) Tracer Milano	(Israel) Maccabi Elite Tel Aviv	(Socialist Federal Republic of Yugoslavia) Partizan	(Greece) Aris
1989	(West Germany) Munich	(Socialist Federal Republic of Yugoslavia) Jugoplastika	(Israel) Maccabi Elite Tel Aviv	(Greece) Aris	(Spain) FC Barcelona
1990	(Spain) Zaragoza	(Socialist Federal Republic of Yugoslavia) Jugoplastika	(Spain) FC Barcelona Banca Catalana	(France) Limoges CSP	(Greece) Aris
1991	(France) Paris	(Socialist Federal Republic of Yugoslavia) POP 84	(Spain) FC Barcelona Banca Catalana	(Israel) Maccabi Elite Tel Aviv	(Italy) Scavolini Pesaro
FIBA European League Final Four
1992	(Turkey) Istanbul	(Socialist Federal Republic of Yugoslavia) Partizan	(Spain) Montigalà Joventut	(Italy) Philips Milano	(Spain) Estudiantes Argentaria
1993	(Greece) Piraeus	(France) Limoges CSP	(Italy) Benetton Treviso	(Greece) PAOK	(Spain) Real Madrid Teka
1994	(Israel) Tel Aviv	(Spain) 7up Joventut	(Greece) Olympiacos	(Greece) Panathinaikos	(Spain) FC Barcelona Banca Catalana
1995	(Spain) Zaragoza	(Spain) Real Madrid Teka	(Greece) Olympiacos	(Greece) Panathinaikos	(France) Limoges CSP
1996	(France) Paris	(Greece) Panathinaikos	(Spain) FC Barcelona Banca Catalana	(Russia) CSKA Moscow	(Spain) Real Madrid Teka
FIBA EuroLeague Final Four
1997	(Italy) Rome	(Greece) Olympiacos	(Spain) FC Barcelona Banca Catalana	(Slovenia) Smelt Olimpija	(France) ASVEL
1998	(Spain) Barcelona	(Italy) Kinder Bologna	(Greece) AEK	(Italy) Benetton Treviso	(Federal Republic of Yugoslavia) Partizan Zepter
1999	(Germany) Munich	(Lithuania) Žalgiris	(Italy) Kinder Bologna	(Greece) Olympiacos	(Italy) Teamsystem Bologna
2000	(Greece) Thessaloniki	(Greece) Panathinaikos	(Israel) Maccabi Elite Tel Aviv	(Turkey) Efes Pilsen	(Spain) FC Barcelona
FIBA SuproLeague Final Four
2001*	(France) Paris	(Israel) Maccabi Elite Tel Aviv	(Greece) Panathinaikos	(Turkey) Efes Pilsen	(Russia) CSKA Moscow
Euroleague Final Four
2002**	(Italy) Bologna	(Greece) Panathinaikos	(Italy) Kinder Bologna	(Italy) Benetton Treviso	(Israel) Maccabi Elite Tel Aviv
2003	(Spain) Barcelona	(Spain) FC Barcelona	(Italy) Benetton Treviso	(Italy) Montepaschi Siena	(Russia) CSKA Moscow
2004	(Israel) Tel Aviv	(Israel) Maccabi Elite Tel Aviv	(Italy) Skipper Bologna	(Russia) CSKA Moscow	(Italy) Montepaschi Siena
2005	(Russia) Moscow	(Israel) Maccabi Elite Tel Aviv	(Spain) Tau Cerámica	(Greece) Panathinaikos	(Russia) CSKA Moscow
2006	(Czech Republic) Prague	(Russia) CSKA Moscow	(Israel) Maccabi Elite Tel Aviv	(Spain) Tau Cerámica	(Spain) Winterthur FC Barcelona
2007	(Greece) Athens	(Greece) Panathinaikos	(Russia) CSKA Moscow	(Spain) Unicaja	(Spain) Tau Cerámica
2008	(Spain) Madrid	(Russia) CSKA Moscow	(Israel) Maccabi Elite Tel Aviv	(Italy) Montepaschi Siena	(Spain) Tau Cerámica
2009	(Germany) Berlin	(Greece) Panathinaikos	(Russia) CSKA Moscow	(Spain) Regal FC Barcelona	(Greece) Olympiacos
2010	(France) Paris	(Spain) Regal FC Barcelona	(Greece) Olympiacos	(Russia) CSKA Moscow	(Serbia) Partizan
2011	(Spain) Barcelona	(Greece) Panathinaikos	(Israel) Maccabi Electra Tel Aviv	(Italy) Montepaschi Siena	(Spain) Real Madrid
2012	(Turkey) Istanbul	(Greece) Olympiacos	(Russia) CSKA Moscow	(Spain) FC Barcelona Regal	(Greece) Panathinaikos
2013	(United Kingdom) London	(Greece) Olympiacos	(Spain) Real Madrid	(Russia) CSKA Moscow	(Spain) FC Barcelona Regal
2014	(Italy) Milan	(Israel) Maccabi Electra Tel Aviv	(Spain) Real Madrid	(Spain) FC Barcelona	(Russia) CSKA Moscow
2015	(Spain) Madrid	(Spain) Real Madrid	(Greece) Olympiacos	(Russia) CSKA Moscow	(Turkey) Fenerbahçe
2016	(Germany) Berlin	(Russia) CSKA Moscow	(Turkey) Fenerbahçe	(Russia) Lokomotiv Kuban	(Spain) Laboral Kutxa
EuroLeague Final Four
2017	(Turkey) Istanbul	(Turkey) Fenerbahçe	(Greece) Olympiacos	(Russia) CSKA Moscow	(Spain) Real Madrid
2018	(Serbia) Belgrade	(Spain) Real Madrid	(Turkey) Fenerbahçe Doğuş	(Lithuania) Žalgiris	(Russia) CSKA Moscow
2019	(Spain) Vitoria-Gasteiz	(Russia) CSKA Moscow	(Turkey) Anadolu Efes	(Spain) Real Madrid	(Turkey) Fenerbahçe
2020	(Germany) Cologne	Cancelled due to COVID-19 pandemic			
2021	(Germany) Cologne	(Turkey) Anadolu Efes	(Spain) FC Barcelona	(Italy) AX Armani Exchange Milan	(Russia) CSKA Moscow
2022	(Serbia) Belgrade	(Turkey) Anadolu Efes	(Spain) Real Madrid	(Spain) FC Barcelona	(Greece) Olympiacos
2023	(Lithuania) Kaunas	(Spain) Real Madrid	(Greece) Olympiacos	(France) AS Monaco	(Spain) FC Barcelona
2024	(Germany) Berlin	(Greece) Panathinaikos AKTOR	(Spain) Real Madrid	(Greece) Olympiacos	(Turkey) Fenerbahçe
2025	(United Arab Emirates) Abu Dhabi	(Turkey) Fenerbahçe	(France) AS Monaco	(Greece) Olympiacos	(Greece) Panathinaikos AKTOR
2026**	(Greece) Athens	(Greece) Olympiacos	(Spain) Real Madrid	(Spain) Valencia Basket	(Turkey) Fenerbahçe

* The 2000–01 season was a transition year, with the best European teams split into two different major leagues, the SuproLeague 2000–01, held by FIBA, and the Euroleague 2000–01, held by Euroleague Basketball. That season's Euroleague Basketball tournament, the Euroleague 2000–01 season, did not end with a Final Four tournament. Instead, it ended with a 5-game playoff series. The EuroLeague now officially recognizes both the 2001 FIBA SuproLeague, and the 2001 Euroleague, in its statistics.

** There was no third-place match. The position is awarded based on the regular season standings.

== Statistics ==
=== Performance by club ===
- Including original FIBA European Champions Cup and EuroLeague Final Four competitions.

Club	1st (Champion)	2nd (Finalist)	3rd	4th	Total
(Greece) Panathinaikos	7	1	3	2	13
(Spain) Real Madrid	5	5	1	4	15
(Greece) Olympiacos	4	6	3	2	15
(Israel) Maccabi Tel Aviv	4	6	1	1	12
(Russia) CSKA Moscow	4	3	7	6	20
(Socialist Federal Republic of Yugoslavia) Split (Note: Playing under the name of "Jugoplastika" and "POP 84" due to sponsorship reasons.)	3	–	–	–	3
(Spain) FC Barcelona	2	5	4	6	17
(Turkey) Fenerbahçe	2	2	–	4	8
(Italy) Olimpia Milano (Note: Playing under the name of "Tracer Milano", "Philips Milano" and "AX Armani Exchange Milan" due to sponsorship reasons.)	2	1	2	–	5
(Turkey) Anadolu Efes	2	1	2	–	5
(Italy) Virtus Bologna (Note: Playing under the name of "Kinder Bologna" due to sponsorship reasons.)	1	2	–	–	3
(Spain) Joventut Badalona	1	1	–	–	2
(Serbia) Partizan	1	–	1	2	4
(France) Limoges CSP	1	–	1	1	3
(Lithuania) Žalgiris	1	–	1	–	2
(Italy) Treviso (Note: Playing under the name of "Benetton Treviso" due to sponsorship reasons.)	–	2	2	–	4
(Spain) Baskonia (Note: Playing under the name of "Tau Cerámica" and "Laboral Kutxa" due to sponsorship reasons.)	–	1	1	3	5
(Czechoslovakia) Slavia VŠ Praha	–	1	1	–	2
(France) AS Monaco	–	1	1	–	2
(Greece) AEK	–	1	–	1	2
(Italy) Fortitudo Bologna (Note: Playing under the name of "Teamsystem Bologna" and "Skipper Bologna" due to sponsorship reasons.)	–	1	–	1	2
(Italy) Mens Sana 1871 (Note: Playing under the name of "Montepaschi Siena" due to sponsorship reasons.)	–	–	3	1	4
(Greece) Aris	–	–	1	2	3
(Slovenia) Olimpija	–	–	1	1	2
(Greece) PAOK	–	–	1	–	1
(Spain) Málaga (Note: Playing under the name of "Unicaja" due to sponsorship reasons.)	–	–	1	–	1
(Russia) Lokomotiv Kuban	–	–	1	–	1
(Spain) Valencia Basket	–	–	1	–	1
(Italy) Victoria Libertas (Note: Playing under the name of "Scavolini Pesaro" due to sponsorship reasons.)	–	–	–	1	1
(Spain) Estudiantes	–	–	–	1	1
(France) ASVEL	–	–	–	1	1
Total	40	40	40	40	160

=== Performance by nation ===
- Including original FIBA European Champions Cup and EuroLeague Final Four competitions.

Nation (Domestic League)	1st	2nd	3rd	4th	Total
Greece (GBL)	11	8	8	7	34
Spain (LEB / ACB)	8	12	8	14	42
Israel (ISBL)	4	6	1	1	12
Russia (RSL / PBL / VTB)	4	3	7	6	20
Turkey (BSL)	4	3	2	4	13
(Socialist Federal Republic of Yugoslavia) SFR Yugoslavia (FFBL)	4	–	1	2	7
Italy (LBA)	3	6	7	3	19
France (Pro A)	1	1	2	2	6
Lithuania (LKL)	1	–	1	–	2
Czechoslovakia (CSBL)	–	1	1	-	2
Soviet Union (PBL)	–	–	1	–	1
Slovenia (SKL)	–	–	1	–	1
Serbia (ABA/KLS)	–	–	–	1	1
Total	40	40	40	40	160

== Opening press conference venues ==
Year	Venue	Host city	Country
2008	Community of Madrid Sports Centre	Madrid	Spain
2009	O2 World	Berlin	Germany
2010	Hôtel de Ville	Paris	France
2011	Gothic Quarter (City hall)	Barcelona	Spain
2012	Çırağan Palace	Istanbul	Turkey
2013	London City Hall	London	England
2014	Piazza del Duomo	Milan	Italy
2015	Cybele Palace	Madrid	Spain
2016	Alexanderplatz	Berlin	Germany
2017	Çırağan Palace	Istanbul	Turkey
2018	Kalemegdan Fortress	Belgrade	Serbia
2019	Plaza Nueva	Vitoria-Gasteiz	Spain
2020	Cancelled due to COVID-19 pandemic		

== EuroLeague Final Four MVPs ==
Season	Final Four MVP	Club	Ref.
1987–88	(United States) Bob McAdoo	(Italy) Tracer Milano	
1988–89	(Socialist Federal Republic of Yugoslavia) Dino Rađa	(Socialist Federal Republic of Yugoslavia) Jugoplastika	
1989–90	(Socialist Federal Republic of Yugoslavia) Toni Kukoč	(Socialist Federal Republic of Yugoslavia) Jugoplastika	
1990–91	(Socialist Federal Republic of Yugoslavia) Toni Kukoč (2)	(Socialist Federal Republic of Yugoslavia) POP 84	
1991–92	(Socialist Federal Republic of Yugoslavia) Sasha Danilović	(Socialist Federal Republic of Yugoslavia) Partizan	
1992–93	(Croatia) Toni Kukoč (3)	(Italy) Benetton Treviso	
1993–94	(Federal Republic of Yugoslavia) Žarko Paspalj	(Greece) Olympiacos	
1994–95	(Lithuania) Arvydas Sabonis	(Spain) Real Madrid Teka	
1995–96	(United States) Dominique Wilkins	(Greece) Panathinaikos	
1996–97	(United States) David Rivers	(Greece) Olympiacos	
1997–98	(Federal Republic of Yugoslavia) Zoran Savić	(Italy) Kinder Bologna	
1998–99	(United States) Tyus Edney	(Lithuania) Žalgiris	
1999–00	(Federal Republic of Yugoslavia) Željko Rebrača	(Greece) Panathinaikos	
2000–01*	(United States) (Slovenia) Ariel McDonald	(Israel) Maccabi Elite Tel Aviv	
2001–02	(Federal Republic of Yugoslavia) Dejan Bodiroga	(Greece) Panathinaikos	
2002–03	(Serbia and Montenegro) Dejan Bodiroga (2)	(Spain) FC Barcelona	
2003–04	(United States) Anthony Parker	(Israel) Maccabi Elite Tel Aviv	
2004–05	(Lithuania) Šarūnas Jasikevičius	(Israel) Maccabi Elite Tel Aviv	
2005–06	(Greece) Theo Papaloukas	(Russia) CSKA Moscow	
2006–07	(Greece) Dimitris Diamantidis	(Greece) Panathinaikos	
2007–08	(United States) Trajan Langdon	(Russia) CSKA Moscow	
2008–09	(Greece) Vassilis Spanoulis	(Greece) Panathinaikos	
2009–10	(Spain) Juan Carlos Navarro	(Spain) Regal FC Barcelona	
2010–11	(Greece) Dimitris Diamantidis (2)	(Greece) Panathinaikos	
2011–12	(Greece) Vassilis Spanoulis (2)	(Greece) Olympiacos	
2012–13	(Greece) Vassilis Spanoulis (3)	(Greece) Olympiacos	
2013–14	(United States) (Montenegro) Tyrese Rice	(Israel) Maccabi Electra Tel Aviv	
2014–15	(Argentina) Andrés Nocioni	(Spain) Real Madrid	
2015–16	(France) Nando de Colo	(Russia) CSKA Moscow	
2016–17	(United States) Ekpe Udoh	(Turkey) Fenerbahçe	
2017–18	(Slovenia) Luka Dončić	(Spain) Real Madrid	
2018–19	(United States) Will Clyburn	(Russia) CSKA Moscow	
2019–20	Cancelled due to COVID-19 pandemic		
2020–21	(Serbia) Vasilije Micić	(Turkey) Anadolu Efes	
2021–22	(Serbia) Vasilije Micić (2)	(Turkey) Anadolu Efes	
2022–23	(Cape Verde) Edy Tavares	(Spain) Real Madrid	
2023–24	(Greece) Kostas Sloukas	(Greece) Panathinaikos AKTOR	
2024–25	(United States) Nigel Hayes-Davis	(Turkey) Fenerbahçe	
2025-26	(France) Evan Fournier	(Greece) Olympiacos	

== See also ==
- EuroLeague
- EuroLeague Finals
- EuroLeague SuperCup
