= EuroLeague Playoffs and Play-in MVP =

The EuroLeague Playoffs MVP and EuroLeague Play-in MVP are annual awards that were given out by the top-tier level European-wide men's professional club basketball league, the EuroLeague. These awards were introduced in the 2024–25 season as part of a revised awards structure designed to better recognize individual performances in distinct phases of the competition.

The Play-In MVP honors the most outstanding player in the Play-In Showdown, a mini-tournament that determines the final playoff spots. The Playoffs MVP is awarded to the best performer across the playoff quarterfinal series.

== EuroLeague Playoffs MVP winners ==
| Season | Position | Player | Team | Ref. |
|---|---|---|---|---|
| 2024–25 | PF | (Bulgaria) Sasha Vezenkov | (Greece) Olympiacos | |
| 2025–26 | PG | (Dominican Republic) Jean Montero | (Spain) Valencia Basket | |

== EuroLeague Play-in MVP winners ==
| Season | Position | Player | Team | Ref. |
|---|---|---|---|---|
| 2024–25 | PG | (United States) (North Macedonia) T. J. Shorts | (France) Paris Basketball | |
| 2025–26 | PG | (United States) (North Macedonia) T. J. Shorts (2) | (Greece) Panathinaikos | |

== See also ==
- EuroLeague Awards
- EuroLeague MVP
- EuroLeague Final Four MVP
- EuroLeague SuperCup MVP
- EuroLeague Player Of the Year, Group Stage MVP, and Top 16 Stage MVP
- 50 Greatest EuroLeague Contributors (2008)
- EuroLeague 2000–2010 All-Decade Team
- EuroLeague 2010–2020 All-Decade Team
- EuroLeague Legends
- EuroLeague 25th Anniversary Team
