= EuroLeague MVP =

European men's basketball award

Sasha Vezenkov the second player to earn EuroLeague MVP honors twice won the award in 2023 and 2026

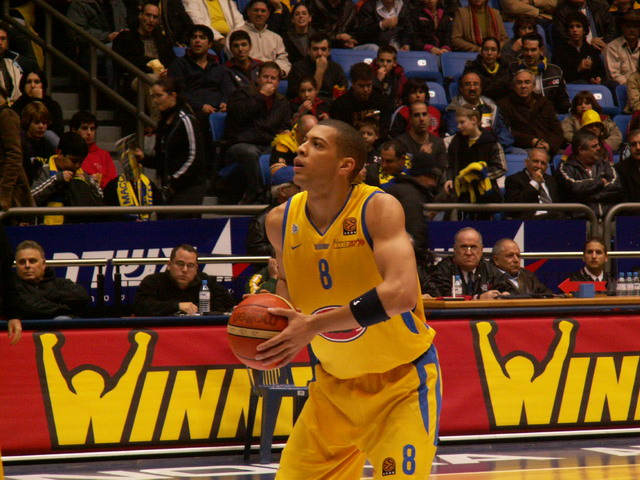
Anthony Parker was the inaugural award winner and only player ever to win two consecutive awards.

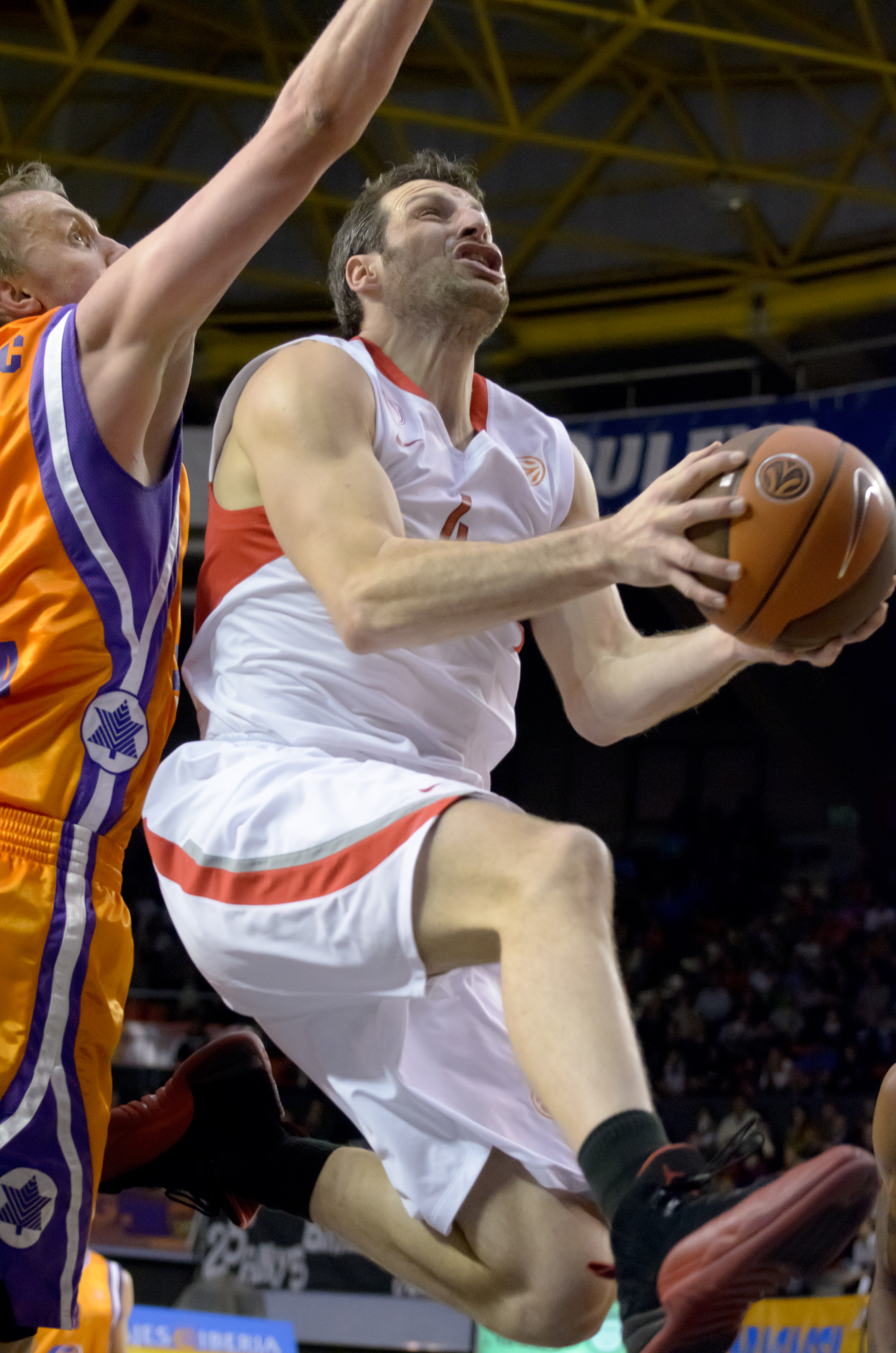
Theodoros Papaloukas was the first Greek winner, as he won the award in 2007

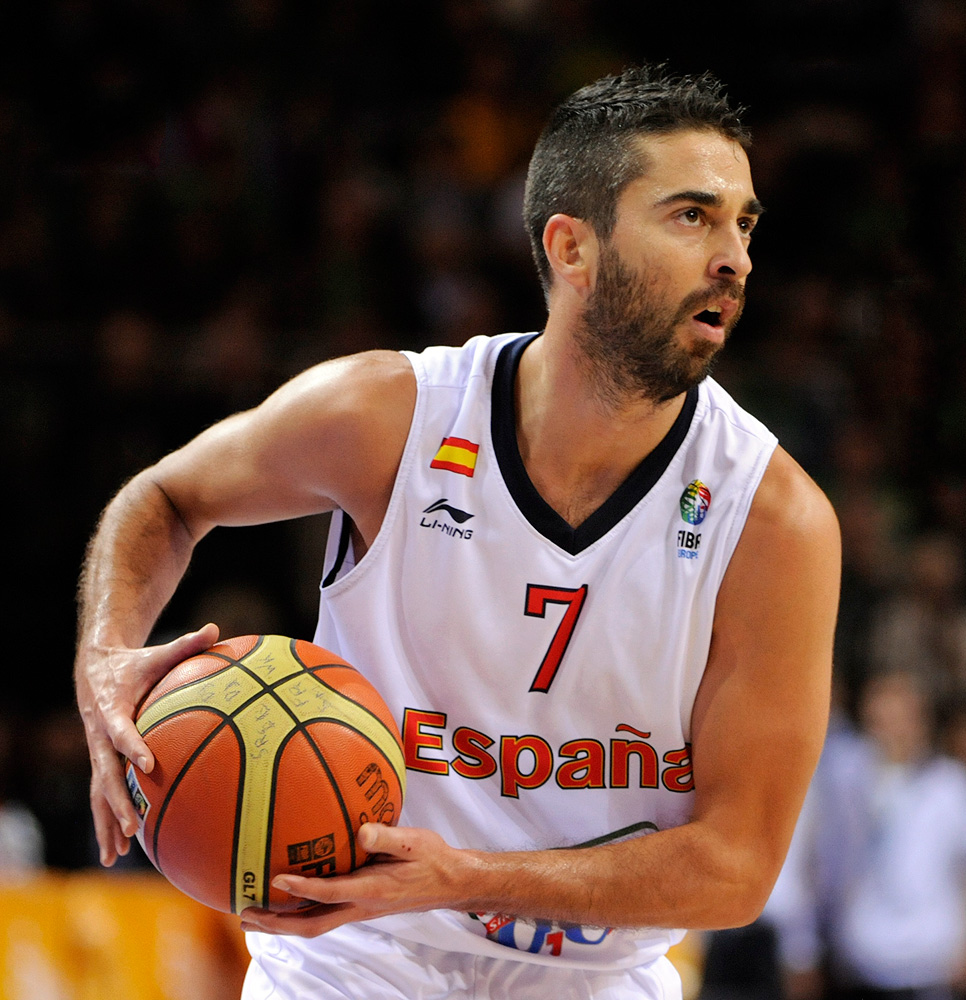
J.C. Navarro was the first Spanish winner, as he won the award in 2009.

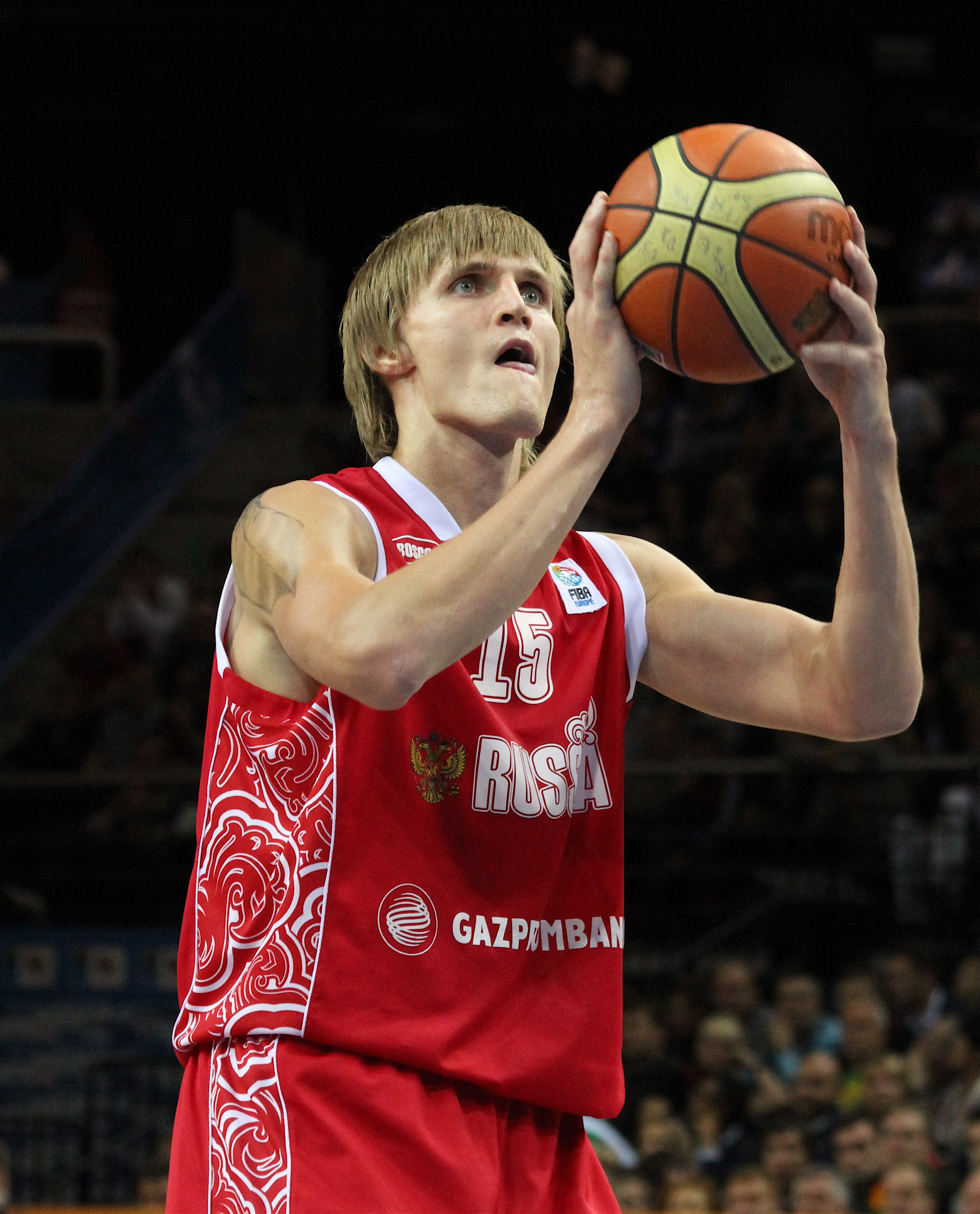
Andrei Kirilenko was the first Russian winner of the award in 2012.

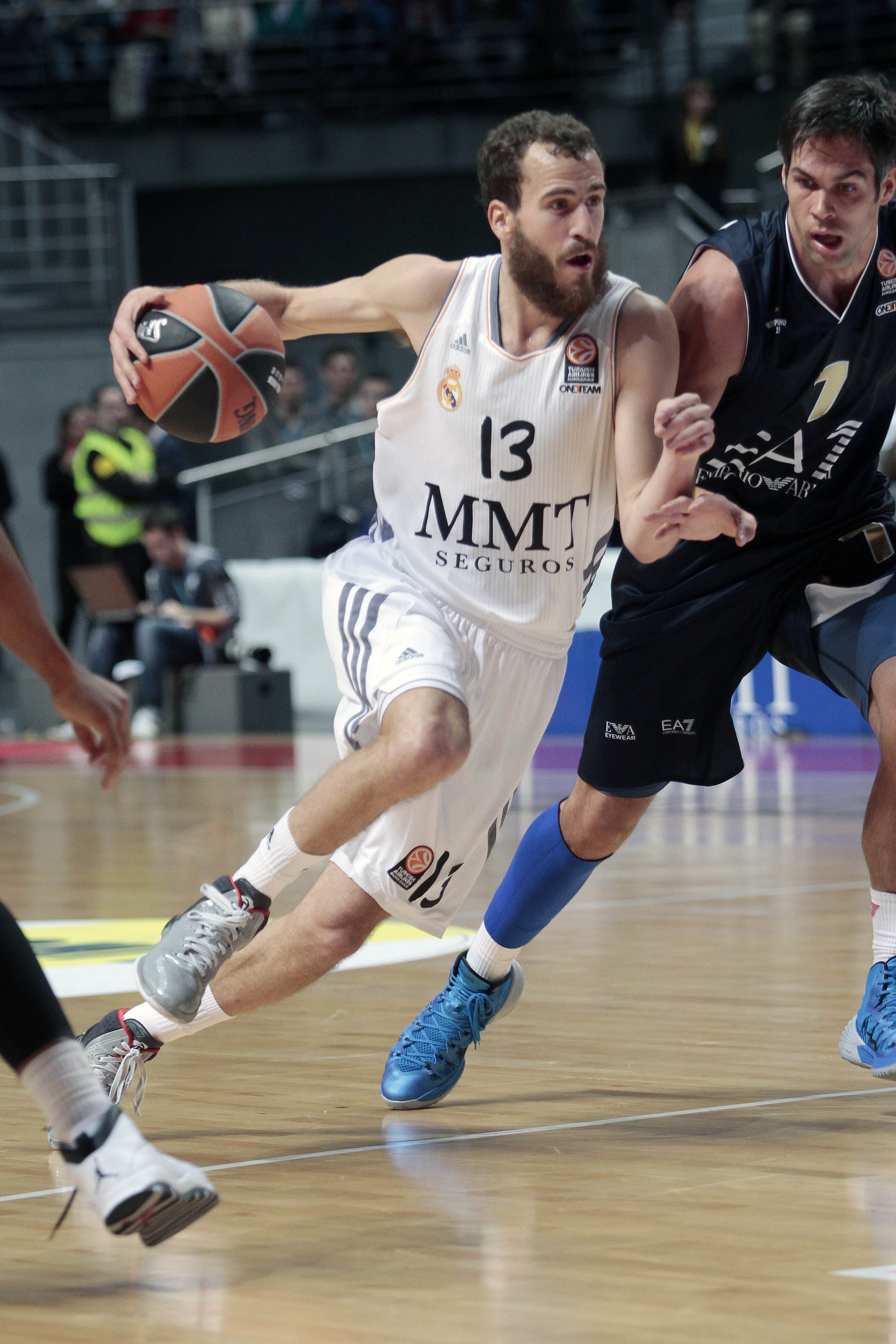
Sergio Rodríguez won the award in 2014.

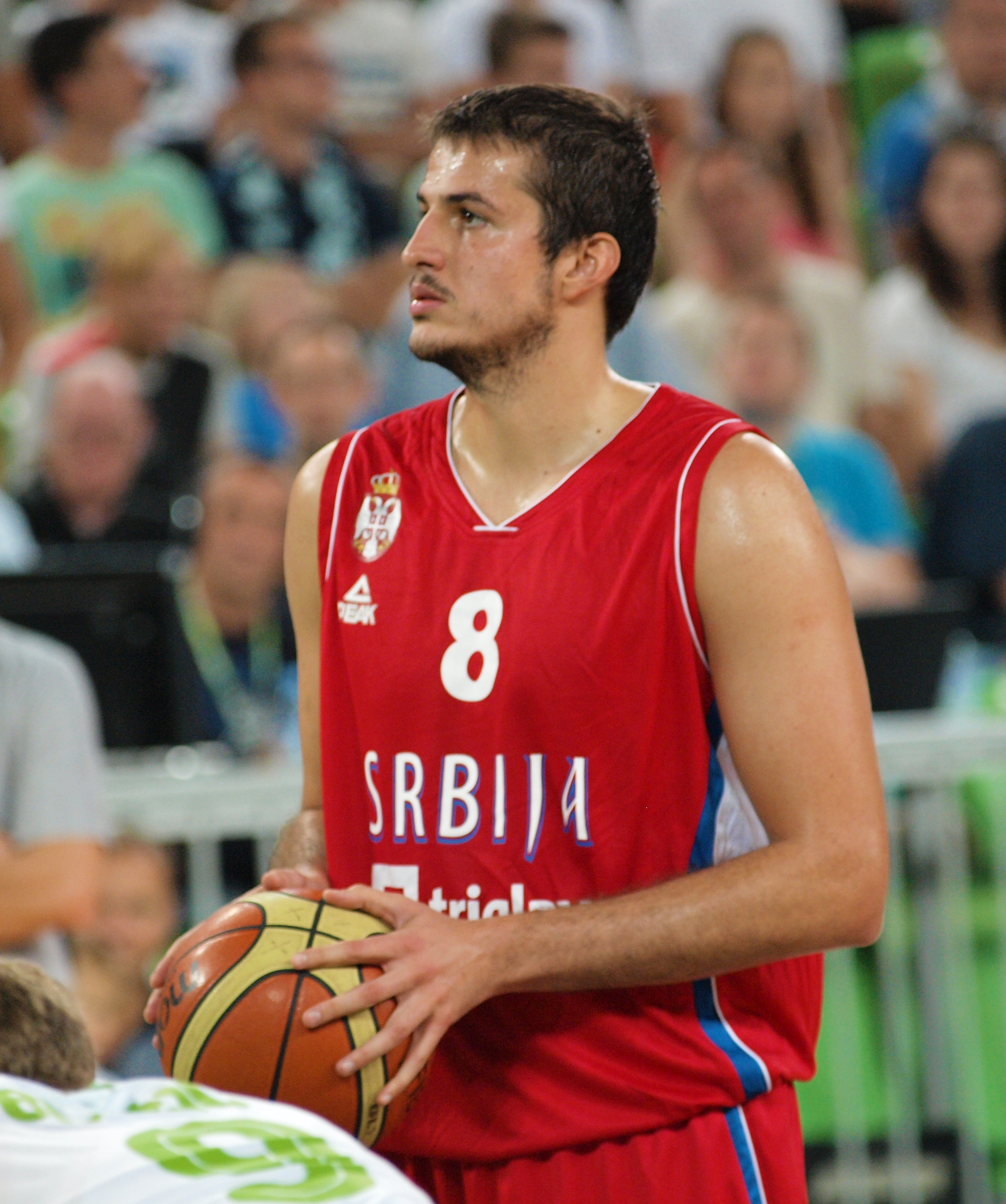
Nemanja Bjelica was the second Serbian award winner.

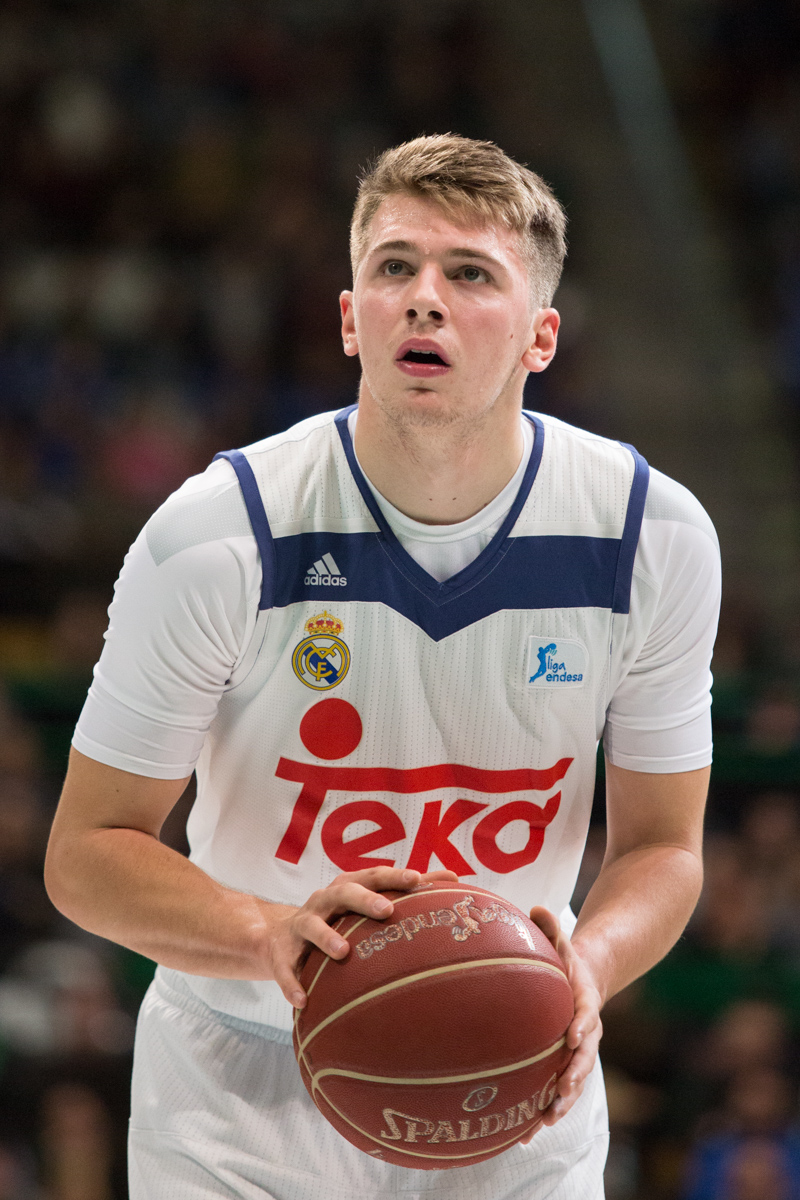
Luka Dončić was the youngest winner of the award at 19 years old in 2018.

The EuroLeague MVP, or EuroLeague Season MVP, is the award bestowed to the player that is deemed to be the "Most Valuable Player" during the regular season of the EuroLeague. The EuroLeague is the top-tier level European-wide men's professional club basketball league in Europe. The award has existed and been awarded by the EuroLeague since the 2004–05 season. It was originally awarded based on performance during league's regular season, top 16 stage, playoffs and/or play-in. Currently, it is awarded based solely on regular season performance.

So far, Anthony Parker and Sasha Vezenkov are the only players who have won the award twice. Vezenkov is also the most recent winner of the award, winning it in 2026.

== Selection criteria ==
The EuroLeague MVP award is the first and only full regular season MVP award that is voted on and given by the EuroLeague. Previous awards like the EuroLeague Group Stage MVP and the EuroLeague Top 16 Stage MVP awards were only for individual phases of the season, with the original Group Stage MVP award being based on the PIR stat, rather than on an actual voting process. When the EuroLeague MVP award was created, those previous awards were phased out altogether, and were replaced by the EuroLeague MVP of the Month award.

The EuroLeague MVP award is based on a voting process. Currently, online fan voting represents 25% of the vote total for the MVP award, while media voting accounts for the remaining 75%. Team success is unofficially paramount during the selection process. Since established, the award has only once gone to a player whose team did not reach the EuroLeague Final Four, when Mike James won the award for the 2023–24 season.

== History ==
Starting with the 2004–05 season, the EuroLeague officially began giving out its Regular Season MVP award for the first time. Unlike the previous EuroLeague Group Stage MVP and EuroLeague Top 16 Stage MVP awards, this award encompasses the full regular season of the EuroLeague, up until the playoffs stage of the competition. Also, rather than being based on the PIR statistical formula, like the earlier EuroLeague Group Stage MVP award, the EuroLeague MVP award is based on a combination of online voting by fans and the media. The online fan vote comprises 25% of the vote total, while the media vote encompasses 75% of the vote total.

== Winners ==
=== Key ===
Player (X)	Name of the player and number of times they had won the award at that point (if more than one)
^	Denotes player who is still active in the EuroLeague
†	Inducted as EuroLeague Legend
‡	Denotes the club were EuroLeague champions in the same season

=== List ===
Season	Player	Pos.	Nationality	Club	Ref.
2004–05	Anthony Parker	SF	United States	(Israel) Maccabi Elite Tel Aviv^{‡}	
2005–06	Anthony Parker (2)	SF	United States	(Israel) Maccabi Elite Tel Aviv	
2006–07	Theo Papaloukas^{†}	PG	Greece	(Russia) CSKA Moscow	
2007–08	Ramūnas Šiškauskas^{†}	SF	Lithuania	(Russia) CSKA Moscow^{‡}	
2008–09	Juan Carlos Navarro^{†}	SG	Spain	(Spain) Regal FC Barcelona	
2009–10	Miloš Teodosić^	G	Serbia	(Greece) Olympiacos	
2010–11	Dimitris Diamantidis^{†}	PG	Greece	(Greece) Panathinaikos^{‡}	
2011–12	Andrei Kirilenko	SF	Russia	(Russia) CSKA Moscow	
2012–13	Vassilis Spanoulis^{†}	G	Greece	(Greece) Olympiacos^{‡}	
2013–14	Sergio Rodríguez^	PG	Spain	(Spain) Real Madrid	
2014–15	Nemanja Bjelica	PF	Serbia	(Turkey) Fenerbahçe Ülker	
2015–16	Nando de Colo	SG	France	(Russia) CSKA Moscow^{‡}	
2016–17	Sergio Llull^	G	Spain	(Spain) Real Madrid	
2017–18	Luka Dončić	SG	Slovenia	(Spain) Real Madrid^{‡}	
2018–19	Jan Veselý	PF	Czech Republic	(Turkey) Fenerbahçe Beko	
2019–20	Not awarded ^{1}				
2020–21	Vasilije Micić	G	Serbia	(Turkey) Anadolu Efes^{‡}	
2021–22	Nikola Mirotić^	PF	Spain	(Spain) FC Barcelona	
2022–23	Sasha Vezenkov^	PF	Bulgaria	(Greece) Olympiacos	
2023–24	Mike James^	G	United States	AS Monaco	
2024–25	Kendrick Nunn^	SG	United States	(Greece) Panathinaikos	
2025–26	Sasha Vezenkov (2)	PF	Bulgaria	(Greece) Olympiacos^{‡}	

Notes:

^1 There was no award given out in the 2019–20 season, because the season was cancelled due to the COVID-19 pandemic in Europe

== Multiple honors ==
=== Players ===
Number	Player
2	(Bulgaria) Sasha Vezenkov
2	(United States) Anthony Parker

=== Player nationality ===
Number	Country
4	Spain
4	United States
3	Serbia
3	Greece
2	Bulgaria
1	Czech Republic
1	France
1	Lithuania
1	Russia
1	Slovenia

=== Teams ===
Number	Team
4	(Russia) CSKA Moscow
4	(Greece) Olympiacos
3	(Spain) Real Madrid
2	(Spain) FC Barcelona
2	(Turkey) Fenerbahçe
2	(Israel) Maccabi Tel Aviv
2	(Greece) Panathinaikos
1	(Turkey) Anadolu Efes
1	Monaco

== See also ==
- EuroLeague Awards
- EuroLeague Playoffs and Play-in MVP
- EuroLeague Final Four MVP
- EuroLeague SuperCup MVP
- EuroLeague Player Of the Year, Group Stage MVP, and Top 16 Stage MVP
- 50 Greatest EuroLeague Contributors (2008)
- EuroLeague 2000–2010 All-Decade Team
- EuroLeague 2010–2020 All-Decade Team
- EuroLeague Legends
- EuroLeague 25th Anniversary Team
