= EuroLeague Player Of the Year, Group Stage MVP, and Top 16 Stage MVP =

The EuroLeague Player Of the Year, Group Stage MVP, and Top 16 Stage MVP were awards that were given out by the top-tier level European-wide men's professional club basketball league, the EuroLeague. Under the organizing body of FIBA Europe, the EuroLeague, which was then known as the FIBA European League, awarded each season's best player with the FIBA European League ("EuroLeague") Player of the Year, or FIBA European League ("EuroLeague") POY award. While under the organizing body of EuroLeague Basketball, the EuroLeague initially gave out MVP awards for both the Group Stage and Top 16 Stage of the competition (the first two group stages of the season). Since these stages of the season each only encompassed a portion of the actual EuroLeague regular season, these awards were eventually phased out.

The EuroLeague then created the EuroLeague MVP of the Month award, which was a more fitting and appropriate award to give out instead, for individual stages of the season; along with the EuroLeague MVP award, which is decided by a voting process, and covers the entire EuroLeague regular season, until the playoffs. There is also an MVP award for the EuroLeague Final Four, which is called the EuroLeague Final Four MVP.

== Selection criteria ==
FIBA Europe's select expert committee voted every year for the FIBA European League ("EuroLeague") Player of the Year award, or FIBA European League ("EuroLeague") POY. At that time, the EuroLeague was still organized by FIBA, and it was officially known as the FIBA European League, or by its shortened name, the "FIBA EuroLeague". The winner of each year's award was announced in FIBA's official monthly magazine, FIBA Basket.

During the EuroLeague Basketball era of the EuroLeague, under its original league format, the competition consisted of four phases. The first phase was the "regular season" or Group Stage. The second phase was the Top 16 Stage, which was the second group stage. The third phase was the Playoffs Stage, and the fourth phase was the EuroLeague Final Four Stage. The Group Stage MVP was the MVP award for the first phase of the season, and the Top 16 Stage MVP, was the MVP award for the second phase of the season.

The Performance Index Rating (PIR) statistical formula was largely determinant in the selection process of these awards. The player with the highest PIR statistical score of the first group stage of the season was named the MVP of the group stage phase, while the PIR statistical score was also strongly emphasized in the selection of the MVP of the Top 16 phase.

== FIBA European League ("EuroLeague") Player of the Year (1993–1996) ==
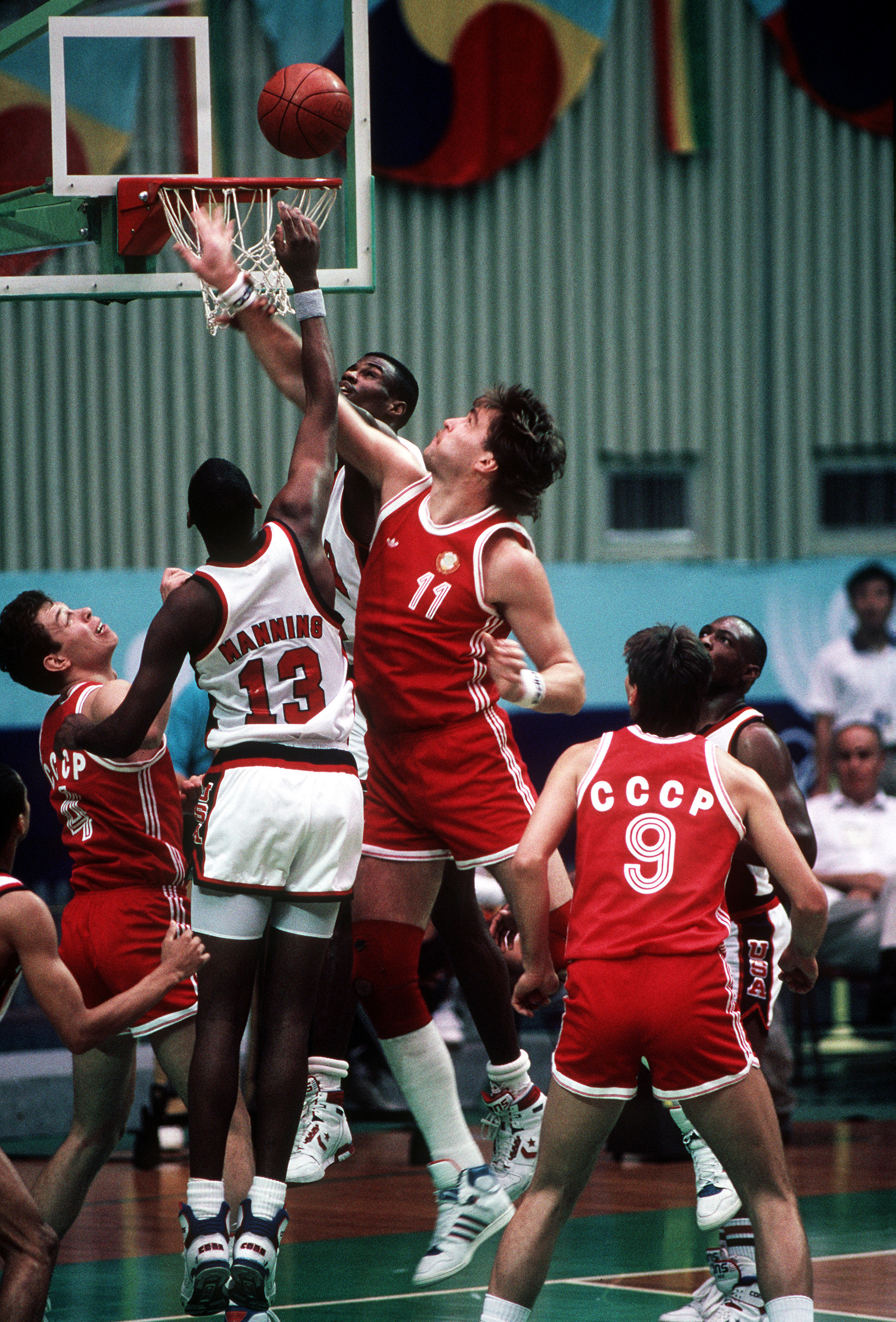
Sabonis (#11 in red), was a 2× FIBA EuroLeague POY (1993, 1995).

FIBA Europe's select expert committee voted every year for the FIBA European League ("EuroLeague") Player of the Year award, or FIBA European League ("EuroLeague") POY. The award was for Europe's best player during the professional club season of the European top-tier level EuroLeague. At that time, the EuroLeague was still organized by FIBA, and it was officially known as the FIBA European League, or its shortened name, the "FIBA EuroLeague". The winner of each year's award was announced in FIBA's official monthly magazine, FIBA Basket.

Bronze	Member of the FIBA Hall of Fame.
Silver	Member of the Naismith Memorial Basketball Hall of Fame.
Gold	Member of both the FIBA Hall of Fame and the Naismith Memorial Basketball Hall of Fame.
Player (X)	Denotes the number of times the player has been named MVP.

Season	Position	Player of the Year	Team
1992–93	C	(Lithuania) Arvydas Sabonis	(Spain) Real Madrid
1993–94	SG	(Socialist Federal Republic of Yugoslavia) Predrag Danilović	(Italy) Virtus Bologna
1994–95	C	(Lithuania) Arvydas Sabonis	(Spain) Real Madrid
1995–96	SF	(Lithuania) Artūras Karnišovas	(Spain) Barcelona

== EuroLeague Group Stage MVP award winners (2000–2004) ==
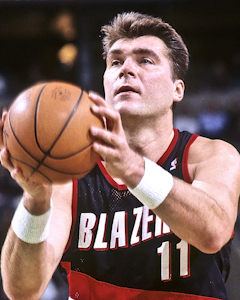
Sabonis was the EuroLeague's Group Stage and Top 16 Stage MVP in 2004.

This was an award for the first group stage of the season, which encompassed between 10–14 games in total. The award was first given in the 2000–01 season, and was awarded every season through the 2003–04 season. The first group stage was 10 games in the 2000–01 season, and it was 14 games in the 2001–02, 2002–03, and 2003–04 seasons. The player with the highest PIR statistical score was named the Regular Season MVP.

Bronze	Member of the FIBA Hall of Fame.
Silver	Member of the Naismith Memorial Basketball Hall of Fame.
Gold	Member of both the FIBA Hall of Fame and the Naismith Memorial Basketball Hall of Fame.
Player (X)	Denotes the number of times the player has been named MVP.

Season	Position	MVP	Team	PIR Score	Ref.
2000–01	C	(Federal Republic of Yugoslavia) Dejan Tomašević	(Federal Republic of Yugoslavia) Budućnost	31.2	
2001–02	PF	(Turkey) Mirsad Türkcan	(Russia) CSKA Moscow	28.1	
2002–2003	C	(United States) Joseph Blair	(Turkey) Ülker	25.0	
2003–04	C	(Lithuania) Arvydas Sabonis	(Lithuania) Žalgiris	26.4	

== EuroLeague Top 16 Stage MVP award winners (2001–2004) ==
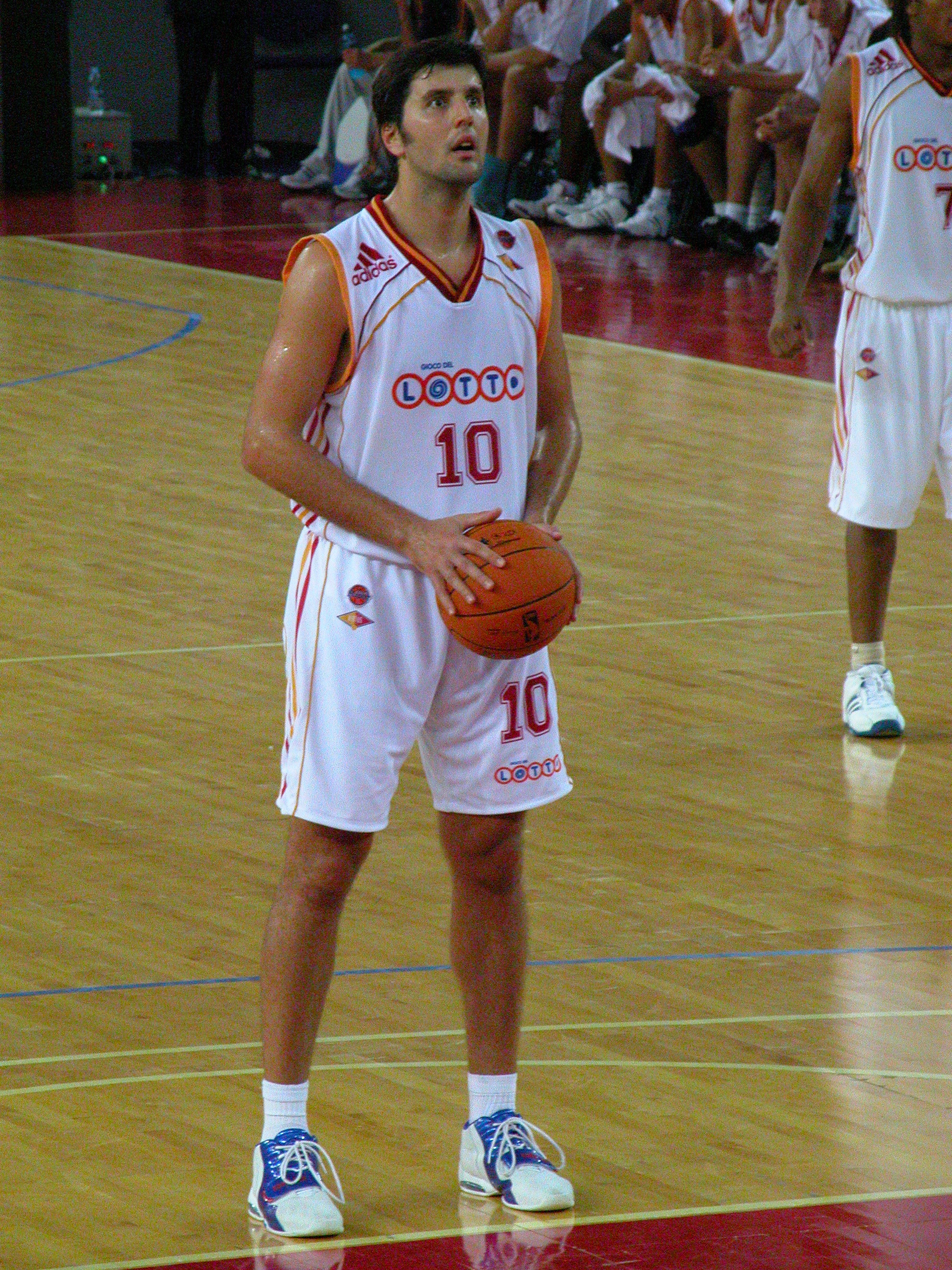
Bodiroga was the EuroLeague's Top 16 Stage MVP in 2002.

This was an award for the second group stage of the season, which encompassed 6 games in total. The award was given out during the 2001–02, 2002–03, and 2003–04 seasons. The PIR statistical score and team record were emphasized in the selection of the Top 16 Stage MVP.

Bronze	Member of the FIBA Hall of Fame.
Silver	Member of the Naismith Memorial Basketball Hall of Fame.
Gold	Member of both the FIBA Hall of Fame and the Naismith Memorial Basketball Hall of Fame.
Player (X)	Denotes the number of times the player has been named MVP.

Season	Position	MVP	Team	PIR Score	Ref.
2001–02	SF	(Federal Republic of Yugoslavia) Dejan Bodiroga	(Greece) Panathinaikos	24.7	
2002–03	PF	(Turkey) Mirsad Türkcan	(Italy) Montepaschi Siena	27.0	
2003–04	C	(Lithuania) Arvydas Sabonis	(Lithuania) Žalgiris	26.0	

== See also ==
- EuroLeague Awards
- EuroLeague MVP
- EuroLeague Playoffs and Play-in MVP
- EuroLeague Final Four MVP
- Performance Index Rating (PIR)
- 50 Greatest EuroLeague Contributors (2008)
- EuroLeague 2000–2010 All-Decade Team
- EuroLeague 2010–2020 All-Decade Team
- EuroLeague Legends
- EuroLeague 25th Anniversary Team
