= Nikola Vujčić =

Croatian basketball player (born 1978)

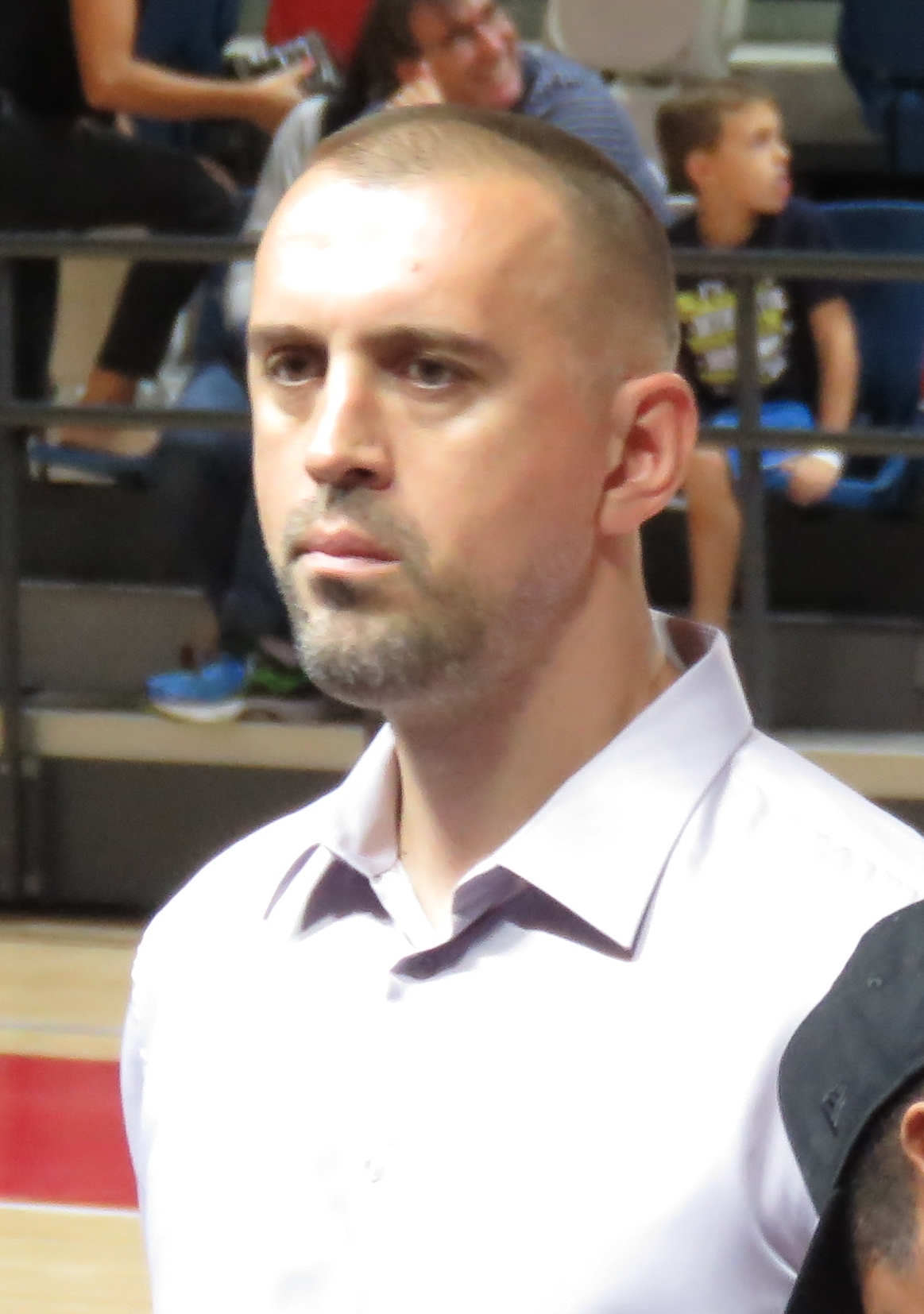
- Vujčić in 2015

Maccabi Tel Aviv
- Title: Team manager
- League: Israeli Premier League; EuroLeague

Personal information
- Born: 14 June 1978 (age 48) Vrgorac, SR Croatia, Yugoslavia
- Listed height: 2.11 m (6 ft 11 in)
- Listed weight: 113 kg (249 lb)

Career information
- NBA draft: 2000: undrafted
- Playing career: 1995–2013
- Position: Power forward / center
- Number: 7

Career history
- 1995–2001: Split
- 2001–2008: Maccabi Tel Aviv
- 2001–2002: →ASVEL
- 2008–2010: Olympiacos
- 2010–2011: Efes Pilsen
- 2011–2013: Split

Career highlights
- As player: 2× EuroLeague champion (2004, 2005); French League champion (2002); 5× Israeli League champion (2003–2007); Croatian Cup winner (1997); 4× Israeli State Cup winner (2003–2006); 3× All-EuroLeague First Team (2005–2007); 2× All-EuroLeague Second Team (2003, 2004); EuroLeague 2000–2010 All-Decade Team (2010); EuroLeague 25th Anniversary Team (2025); FIBA EuroStar (2007); EuroLeague Legend (2022); 3× Israeli League Quintet (2003, 2004, 2007); Israeli League Cup winner (2007); Israeli League Finals MVP (2006); Greek Cup winner (2010); All-Greek League Second Team (2009)
Medals
Men's basketball
Representing Croatia
European U-18 Championship
| Gold medal – first place | 1996 France | Under-18 Team |
European Championship for Cadets
| Gold medal – first place | 1995 Portugal | Under-16 Team |

Nikola Vujčić (born 14 June 1978) is a Croatian former professional basketball player, and the current team manager of the Israeli club Maccabi Tel Aviv. During his playing career, he played at both the center and power forward positions. As a player, he was a two-time EuroLeague champion (2004, 2005), a five-time All-EuroLeague Team selection (2003, 2004, 2005, 2006, 2007), and was voted as a member of the EuroLeague 2000–2010 All-Decade Team. He was also the 2006 Israeli Basketball Premier League Finals MVP.

The 6-foot-11 inches tall Vujčić was the first player in the EuroLeague's current era (2000–present), to achieve a triple-double. On 3 November 2005, he helped in Maccabi Tel Aviv's 95–68 win versus the Polish club Prokom Trefl Sopot, with 11 points, 12 rebounds, and 11 assists. On 30 November 2006, Vujčić recorded another triple-double, the second in the EuroLeague's current era (2000–present), in Maccabi Tel Aviv's 110–87 win over the Slovenian club Union Olimpija, with 27 points, 10 rebounds, and 10 assists. He was named a EuroLeague Legend in 2022.

== Professional career ==
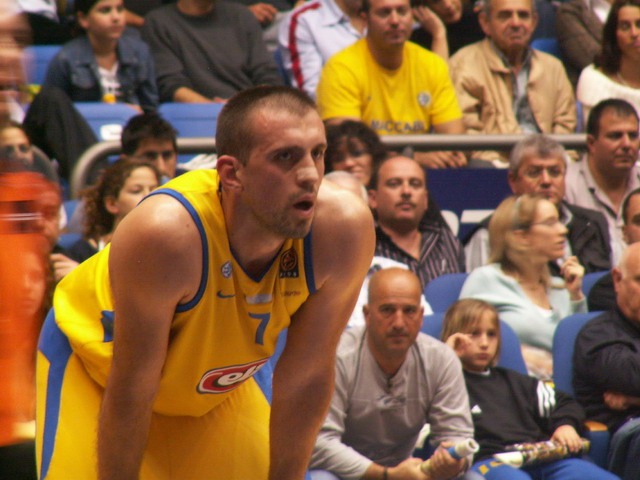
Vujčić, while playing with Maccabi Tel Aviv in 2006

Vujčić made his professional club debut with the Croatian club KK Split, in the 1995–96 season, after coming up through the youth teams of the club. He played with Split through the 2000–01 season. As a member of Split, he wore the number 7 jersey that had once belonged to the former Split star and former NBA player, Toni Kukoč. With Split, Vujčić twice appeared in the Croatian League playoff's finals. With the club at the European-wide level, he also played in 28 FIBA Saporta Cup games (2nd European Level), in 23 FIBA SuproLeague games, and in 34 EuroLeague games (1st European level).

In 2001, he was signed by the Israeli club Maccabi Tel Aviv, as a replacement for Nate Huffman, who was expected to leave the club. At the last moment though, Huffman decided to return to the club for one more season, so Maccabi sent Vujčić on loan to the French club ASVEL Villeurbanne. Vujčić helped ASVEL win the French League championship, for the first time in 21 years. He also played in 14 EuroLeague games that season (2 with Maccabi and 12 with ASVEL), in which he averaged 15.7 points and 6.4 rebounds per game.

With Maccabi Tel Aviv, From 2002 to 2008, he won two EuroLeague championships (2004 and 2005), five Israeli Super League championships, four Israeli State Cups, and one Israeli League Cup. He was also the 2006 Israeli Basketball Premier League Finals MVP.

On 18 June 2008, he signed a two-year contract, worth €4.5 million net income, with the Greek Basket League club Olympiacos Piraeus. On 25 October 2010, he signed a contract with the Turkish Super League club Efes Pilsen. After playing with Split, from 2011 to 2013, he announced his retirement from playing professional basketball.

== National team career ==
As a member of the senior Croatian national team, Vujčić played at the 1999 EuroBasket, the 2001 EuroBasket, the 2005 EuroBasket, and the 2009 EuroBasket.

== Managerial and player developmental career ==
After he retired from playing professional basketball, Vujcic opened up his own basketball academy, in his home-town of Split, Croatia, where he would go on to help train young players to improve their basketball skills. Two of the main prospects to have been a part of the academy were Dragan Bender, who eventually became the number 4 overall pick of the 2016 NBA draft, and Ante Žižić, who was drafted 23rd overall in the same draft.

In the 2013–14 season, Vujčić returned to one of his former clubs from his playing days, Maccabi Tel Aviv, to work as the team's manager. After he took over that position, Maccabi Tel Aviv went through an historic down period for the club, as at one point, the team had failed to win three consecutive Israeli national league championships (2015–2017), and at another point, had also failed to reach the EuroLeague's postseason phase four years in a row (2016–2019). Subsequently, many Israeli sports journalists and basketball analysts claimed that the team's inability to achieve its goals was due to the policies that had been implemented by Vujčić.

== Personal life ==
Vujčić, was born in Vrgorac, in inland Dalmatia, SR Croatia, in the former SFR Yugoslavia. On 17 January 2018, after he had lived in Israel for 10 years, the Israeli Ministry of Interior granted a temporary Israeli citizenship to Vujčić and his family, after he had requested it.

== Career statistics ==
Legend
| GP | Games played | GS | Games started | MPG | Minutes per game |
| FG% | Field-goal percentage | 3P% | 3-point field-goal percentage | FT% | Free-throw percentage |
| RPG | Rebounds per game | APG | Assists per game | SPG | Steals per game |
| BPG | Blocks per game | PPG | Points per game | PIR | Performance index rating |
| **Bold** | Career high |

=== EuroLeague ===
| † | Denotes season in which Vujčić won the EuroLeague |
| * | Led the league |

| Year | Team | GP | GS | MPG | FG% | 3P% | FT% | RPG | APG | SPG | BPG | PPG | PIR |
|---|---|---|---|---|---|---|---|---|---|---|---|---|---|
| 2001–02 | Maccabi | 2 | 0 | 6.0 | **.667** | .000 | — | .5 | — | 1.0 | — | 2.0 | 1.0 |
| 2001–02 | ASVEL | 12 | 2 | 29.6 | .520 | .278 | .714 | 7.4 | 1.9 | **1.5** | .8 | **18.0** | **22.3** |
| 2002–03 | Maccabi | 20 | 16 | 28.5 | .551 | .386 | .691 | 7.1 | 1.8 | 1.4 | .8 | 17.6 | 21.2 |
| 2003–04† | Maccabi | 21 | 21 | **34.9** | .548 | .226 | **.800** | 6.9 | 3.0 | .9 | .8 | 16.8 | 20.0 |
| 2004–05† | Maccabi | 21 | 21 | 26.4 | .581 | .391 | .726 | 5.6 | 3.0 | 1.1 | .8 | 13.9 | 17.9 |
| 2005–06 | Maccabi | **24** | **24** | 31.2 | .458 | .405 | .656 | 5.7 | **3.9** | .9 | **.9** | 11.9 | 15.4 |
| 2006–07 | Maccabi | 22 | 22 | 31.0 | .541 | **.467** | .745 | **7.6** | **3.9** | 1.1 | .8 | 14.9 | 21.7* |
| 2007–08 | Maccabi | 12 | 9 | 21.0 | .544 | .400 | .559 | 4.3 | 3.2 | .7 | .2 | 9.6 | 11.3 |
| 2008–09 | Olympiacos | 21 | 20 | 22.2 | .553 | .250 | .645 | 3.8 | 2.6 | .8 | .5 | 11.4 | 13.9 |
| 2009–10 | Olympiacos | 22* | 1 | 14.3 | .584 | .000 | .577 | 2.7 | 1.7 | .5 | .3 | 7.4 | 8.3 |
| 2010–11 | Efes | 15 | 14 | 18.1 | .411 | .000 | .697 | 3.1 | 2.1 | .6 | .2 | 6.5 | 6.7 |
| Career | | 192 | 150 | 25.8 | .532 | .345 | .695 | 5.4 | 2.7 | .9 | .6 | 12.7 | 15.9 |
