= EuroLeague awards =

Basketball league awards

EuroLeague awards were established in the FIBA era of the competition, when FIBA Europe began the FIBA Europe All-Star Game and FIBA European Selection awards, during the 1964–65 season. Subsequent awards were added during the FIBA era, such as the EuroLeague Final Four MVP award, which began with the 1987–88 season. Yet more awards were created starting with the 2000–01 basketball season, when the EuroLeague Commercial Assets (ECA), essentially took over the management of the premier level European competition from FIBA Europe.

== EuroLeague awards ==
=== FIBA European League Player of the Year ===
The FIBA European League ("EuroLeague") Player of the Year award was the award for the best player of each season of the top-tier level FIBA EuroLeague, which was organized by FIBA Europe. The award's winner was announced by FIBA's monthly magazine publication, FIBA Basket.

- 1992–93 (Lithuania) Arvydas Sabonis (Real Madrid)
- 1993–94 (Federal Republic of Yugoslavia) Sasha Danilović (Virtus Bologna)
- 1994–95 (Lithuania) Arvydas Sabonis (Real Madrid)
- 1995–96 (Lithuania) Artūras Karnišovas (FC Barcelona)

== EuroLeague MVP ==
The EuroLeague MVP award began in the 2004–05 season. It replaced both the EuroLeague Group Stage MVP and EuroLeague Top Stage 16 MVP awards. The EuroLeague MVP award combined the Group Stage and Top 16 Stage awards together into a new award that is for the entire EuroLeague regular season, Top 16, and playoffs, up until the EuroLeague Final Four. The award is based on a voting process, rather than on the PIR stat, like the EuroLeague Group Stage MVP and EuroLeague Top 16 Stage MVP awards were. The award is analogous to the NBA Most Valuable Player Award.

- 2004–05 (United States) Anthony Parker (Maccabi Tel Aviv)
- 2005–06 (United States) Anthony Parker (Maccabi Tel Aviv)
- 2006–07 (Greece) Theo Papaloukas (CSKA Moscow)
- 2007–08 (Lithuania) Ramūnas Šiškauskas (CSKA Moscow)
- 2008–09 (Spain) Juan Carlos Navarro (Regal FC Barcelona)
- 2009–10 (Serbia) Miloš Teodosić (Olympiacos)
- 2010–11 (Greece) Dimitris Diamantidis (Panathinaikos)
- 2011–12 (Russia) Andrei Kirilenko (CSKA Moscow)
- 2012–13 (Greece) Vassilis Spanoulis (Olympiacos)
- 2013–14 (Spain) Sergio Rodríguez (Real Madrid)
- 2014–15 (Serbia) Nemanja Bjelica (Fenerbahçe Ülker)
- 2015–16 (France) Nando de Colo (CSKA Moscow)
- 2016–17 (Spain) Sergio Llull (Real Madrid)
- 2017–18 (Slovenia) Luka Dončić (Real Madrid)
- 2018–19 (Czech Republic) Jan Veselý (Fenerbahçe Beko)
- 2020–21 (Serbia) Vasilije Micić (Anadolu Efes)
- 2021–22 (Montenegro) (Spain) Nikola Mirotić (Barcelona)
- 2022–23 (Bulgaria) Sasha Vezenkov (Olympiacos)
- 2023–24 (United States) Mike James (AS Monaco)
- 2024–25 (United States) Kendrick Nunn (Panathinaikos)
- 2025–26 (Bulgaria) Sasha Vezenkov (Olympiacos)

== EuroLeague Final Four MVP ==
The Turkish Airlines EuroLeague Final Four MVP award is the MVP award for the final two games of the EuroLeague season. The award began in the 1987–88 season, when the EuroLeague Final Four modern era began. It is the originating MVP award, intended as the "most valuable player" on the best team award and is generally considered the most prestigious and important individual award given in European club basketball. The award is based on a voting process involving members of the press.

Toni Kukoč of Jugoplastika, Pop 84 and Benetton Treviso won the award three times, two of them consecutively. Vassilis Spanoulis of Panathinaikos and Olympiacos has also won the award three times, two of them consecutively. Dejan Bodiroga also won the award two consecutive times, with two different teams (Panathinaikos and FC Barcelona).

There were two major European club basketball competitions in the 2000–01 season, the 2000–01 EuroLeague, and the FIBA SuproLeague 2000–01. After the 2000–01 season ended, the EuroLeague took over the FIBA SuproLeague and absorbed it. As part of the agreement, the championship and MVPs won in the SuproLeague were to be kept as records by the EuroLeague. Ariel McDonald won the Final Four MVP of that season's FIBA SuproLeague, however, he did not play in the EuroLeague competition at all that season.

- 1987–88 (United States) Bob McAdoo (Tracer Milano)
- 1988–89 (Socialist Federal Republic of Yugoslavia) Dino Rađja (Jugoplastika)
- 1989–90 (Socialist Federal Republic of Yugoslavia) Toni Kukoč (Jugoplastika)
- 1990–91 (Socialist Federal Republic of Yugoslavia) Toni Kukoč (Pop 84)
- 1991–92 (Federal Republic of Yugoslavia) Sasha Danilović (Partizan)
- 1992–93 (Croatia) Toni Kukoč (Benetton Treviso)
- 1993–94 (Federal Republic of Yugoslavia) Žarko Paspalj (Olympiacos)
- 1994–95 (Lithuania) Arvydas Sabonis (Real Madrid)
- 1995–96 (United States) Dominique Wilkins (Panathinaikos)
- 1996–97 (United States) David Rivers (Olympiacos)
- 1997–98 (Federal Republic of Yugoslavia) Zoran Savić (Kinder Bologna)
- 1998–99 (United States) Tyus Edney (Žalgiris)
- 1999–00 (Federal Republic of Yugoslavia) Željko Rebrača (Panathinaikos)
- 2000–01 (United States) (Slovenia) Ariel McDonald (Maccabi Tel Aviv) (FIBA SuproLeague)*^{[a]}
- 2000–01 (Argentina) Manu Ginóbili (Kinder Bologna) (Euroleague Basketball)*^{[b]}
- 2001–02 (Federal Republic of Yugoslavia) Dejan Bodiroga (Panathinaikos)
- 2002–03 (Serbia and Montenegro) Dejan Bodiroga (FC Barcelona)
- 2003–04 (United States) Anthony Parker (Maccabi Tel Aviv)
- 2004–05 (Lithuania) Šarūnas Jasikevičius (Maccabi Tel Aviv)
- 2005–06 (Greece) Theo Papaloukas (CSKA Moscow)
- 2006–07 (Greece) Dimitris Diamantidis (Panathinaikos)
- 2007–08 (United States) Trajan Langdon (CSKA Moscow)
- 2008–09 (Greece) Vassilis Spanoulis (Panathinaikos)
- 2009–10 (Spain) Juan Carlos Navarro (Regal FC Barcelona)
- 2010–11 (Greece) Dimitris Diamantidis (Panathinaikos)
- 2011–12 (Greece) Vassilis Spanoulis (Olympiacos)
- 2012–13 (Greece) Vassilis Spanoulis (Olympiacos)
- 2013–14 (United States) (Montenegro) Tyrese Rice (Maccabi Tel Aviv)
- 2014–15 (Argentina) Andrés Nocioni (Real Madrid)
- 2015–16 (France) Nando de Colo (CSKA Moscow)
- 2016–17 (United States) (Nigeria) Ekpe Udoh (Fenerbahçe)
- 2017–18 (Slovenia) Luka Dončić (Real Madrid)
- 2018–19 (United States) Will Clyburn (CSKA Moscow)
- 2020–21 (Serbia) Vasilije Micić (Anadolu Efes)
- 2021–22 (Serbia) Vasilije Micić (Anadolu Efes)
- 2022–23 (Cape Verde) Edy Tavares (Real Madrid)
- 2023–24 (Greece) Kostas Sloukas (Panathinaikos)
- 2024–25 (United States) Nigel Hayes-Davis (Fenerbahçe)
- 2025–26 (France) Evan Fournier (Olympiacos)

== EuroLeague Playoffs MVP ==
The EuroLeague Playoffs MVP award is the MVP award for the playoffs of the season. It was first given awarded in the 2024–25 season.

- 2024–25 (Bulgaria) Sasha Vezenkov (Olympiacos)

== EuroLeague Play-in MVP ==
The EuroLeague Play-in MVP award is the MVP award for the Play-ins of the season. It was first awarded in the 2024–25 season.

- 2024–25 (United States) (North Macedonia) T. J. Shorts (Paris)

== EuroLeague Top 16 Stage MVP ==
The EuroLeague Top 16 Stage MVP award was the MVP award for the Top 16 stage of the season. The award was based on the PIR stat, instead of a voting process. It began in the 2001–02 season, and it was discontinued after the 2003–04 season. It was phased out as an award, when the EuroLeague created the EuroLeague MVP of the Month and EuroLeague MVP awards in place of it, beginning in the 2004–05 season.

- 2001–02 (Federal Republic of Yugoslavia) Dejan Bodiroga (Panathinaikos)
- 2002–03 (Turkey) Mirsad Türkcan (Montepaschi Siena)
- 2003–04 (Lithuania) Arvydas Sabonis (Žalgiris)

== EuroLeague Group Stage MVP ==
The EuroLeague Group Stage MVP award was the MVP award for the first group stage of the season. The award was based on the PIR stat, instead of a voting process. It began in the 2000–01 season and it was discontinued after the 2003–04 season. It was phased out as an award, when the EuroLeague created the EuroLeague MVP of the Month and EuroLeague MVP awards in place of it, beginning in the 2004–05 season.

- 2000–01 (Federal Republic of Yugoslavia) Dejan Tomašević (Budućnost) (EuroLeague Basketball)*^{[d]}
- 2001–02 (Turkey) Mirsad Türkcan (CSKA Moscow)
- 2002–03 (United States) Joseph Blair (Ülker)
- 2003–04 (Lithuania) Arvydas Sabonis (Žalgiris)

== EuroLeague MVP of the Month ==
The EuroLeague MVP of the Month award is the award for the league's best player for each month of the season. The award began in the 2004–05 season.

== EuroLeague MVP of the Round ==
The EuroLeague MVP of the Round award is the award for the league's best player for each round of the season. The award is given to the player that has the highest PIR stat among all players from winning teams for that round's EuroLeague games. The award is given based on a one-game performance. The award began in the 2000–01 season.

== EuroLeague Finals Top Scorer ==
The EuroLeague Finals Top Scorer is the player that scored the highest amount of points in the EuroLeague Championship Game, which is the championship final of the European-wide top-tier level professional club basketball competition, the EuroLeague.

== Alphonso Ford Top Scorer Trophy ==
The EuroLeague Alphonso Ford EuroLeague Top Scorer Trophy is the award given to the leading scorer of the EuroLeague. It is named in honor of Alphonso Ford. The specific awarding of the trophy honoring Ford, began with the 2004–05 season.

== All-EuroLeague Team ==
Every season, five players are chosen, regardless of their positions, for each of the two All-EuroLeague teams (the first and second teams). The voting process involves both fans and a panel of journalists and experts. Online fan voting accounts for 25% of the vote total, while media voting for the remaining 75%.

== EuroLeague All-Final Four Team ==
The EuroLeague All-Final Four Team, or FIBA SuproLeague All-Final Four Team, was an award given for the EuroLeague's top five basketball players, of each season's EuroLeague Final Four competition. The EuroLeague Final Four MVP, was selected from among the five players of the EuroLeague Final Four Team. The award existed during the era in which the EuroLeague was organized by FIBA Europe. It was bestowed for the last time by the FIBA SuproLeague, during the 2000–01 season's FIBA SuproLeague Final Four.

== EuroLeague Best Defender ==
The EuroLeague Best Defender award is the award for the league's best defensive player throughout the season up until the EuroLeague Final Four. The award began in the 2004–05 season, and is based on a voting process involving EuroLeague head coaches. Dimitris Diamantidis of Panathinaikos, won the award five consecutive times, from 2005 to 2009.

- 2004–05 (Greece) Dimitris Diamantidis (Panathinaikos)
- 2005–06 (Greece) Dimitris Diamantidis (Panathinaikos)
- 2006–07 (Greece) Dimitris Diamantidis (Panathinaikos)
- 2007–08 (Greece) Dimitris Diamantidis (Panathinaikos)
- 2008–09 (Greece) Dimitris Diamantidis (Panathinaikos)
- 2009–10 (Russia) Victor Khryapa (CSKA Moscow)
- 2010–11 (Greece) Dimitris Diamantidis (Panathinaikos)
- 2011–12 (Russia) Andrei Kirilenko (CSKA Moscow)
- 2012–13 (Gabon) Stéphane Lasme (Panathinaikos)
- 2013–14 (United States) (Armenia) Bryant Dunston (Olympiacos)
- 2014–15 (United States) (Armenia) Bryant Dunston (Olympiacos)
- 2015–16 (United States) Kyle Hines (CSKA Moscow)
- 2016–17 (Hungary) Ádám Hanga (Baskonia)
- 2017–18 (United States) Kyle Hines (CSKA Moscow)
- 2018–19 (Cape Verde) Edy Tavares (Real Madrid)
- 2020–21 (Cape Verde) Edy Tavares (Real Madrid)
- 2021–22 (United States) Kyle Hines (AX Armani Exchange Milan)
- 2022–23 (Cape Verde) Edy Tavares (Real Madrid)
- 2023–24 (United States) (Greece) Thomas Walkup (Olympiacos)
- 2024–25 (United States) (Germany) Nick Weiler-Babb (Bayern Munich)

== EuroLeague Rising Star ==
The EuroLeague Rising Star award is the award for the league's "future rising star". Only players that were younger than age 22, after July 1, of the summer before the season started are eligible for the award. It was established in the 2004–05 season, and is based on a voting process involving all EuroLeague head coaches.

- 2004–05 (Slovenia) Erazem Lorbek (Climamio Bologna)
- 2005–06 (Italy) Andrea Bargnani (Benetton Treviso)
- 2006–07 (Spain) Rudy Fernández (DKV Joventut)
- 2007–08 (Italy) Danilo Gallinari (Armani Jeans Milano)
- 2008–09 (Serbia) Novica Veličković (Partizan)
- 2009–10 (Spain) Ricky Rubio (Regal FC Barcelona)
- 2010–11 (Montenegro) (Spain) Nikola Mirotić (Real Madrid)
- 2011–12 (Montenegro) (Spain) Nikola Mirotić (Real Madrid)
- 2012–13 (Greece) Kostas Papanikolaou (Olympiacos)
- 2013–14 (Serbia) Bogdan Bogdanović (Partizan)
- 2014–15 (Serbia) Bogdan Bogdanović (Fenerbahçe Ülker)
- 2015–16 (Spain) Álex Abrines (FC Barcelona Lassa)
- 2016–17 (Slovenia) Luka Dončić (Real Madrid)
- 2017–18 (Slovenia) Luka Dončić (Real Madrid)
- 2018–19 (Georgia (country)) Goga Bitadze (Budućnost VOLI)
- 2020–21 (Spain) Usman Garuba (Real Madrid)
- 2021–22 (Lithuania) Rokas Jokubaitis (Barcelona)
- 2022–23 (Israel) Yam Madar (Partizan)
- 2023–24 (Italy) Gabriele Procida (Alba Berlin)
- 2024–25 (France) Nadir Hifi (Paris)

== EuroLeague Magic Moment of the season ==
The EuroLeague Magic Moment of the Season is the award for the league's "most spectacular play of the season". It was established in the 2016–17 season, and is selected through an online vote of the fans.

== EuroLeague Flight Time of the Season ==
The EuroLeague Flight Time of the Season, is the award for the EuroLeague player who "flew the highest", on an individual basketball slam dunk during the season. The winner of the award is selected by an online vote of the fans.

== Alexander Gomelsky EuroLeague Coach of the Year ==
The Alexander Gomelsky EuroLeague Coach of the Year award is given to the best head coach of the season, who wins the Alexander Gomelsky Trophy, in recognition of his achievements, after the end of the full EuroLeague season. The award was established in the 2004–05 season, and is based on a voting process involving all EuroLeague head coaches.

== Gianluigi Porelli EuroLeague Executive of the Year ==
The best CEO of the EuroLeague season wins the Gianluigi Porelli EuroLeague Executive of the Year award. The award was established starting with the 2004–05 season.

== EuroLeague Legends ==
EuroLeague Basketball Legends are a small group of the biggest EuroLeague stars, which are honored in recognition of their playing careers in the league.

== 50 Greatest EuroLeague Contributors ==
The 50 Greatest Contributors in EuroLeague history list, was chosen on February 3, 2008, by a panel of European basketball experts. It consisted of 35 players, 10 coaches, and 5 referees, and included other nominees for each category; all together 105 players, 20 coaches, and 12 referees were nominated.

== EuroLeague 2000–2010 All-Decade Team ==
The EuroLeague 2000–2010 All-Decade Team consisted of basketball players named to the EuroLeague's All-Decade Team, for the first 10 years of the EuroLeague Commercial Assets (ECA)'s competition, from 2000–10.

There were 50 players nominated for the All-Decade Team. Voting included votes from selected media members and fans.

== EuroLeague 2010–2020 All-Decade Team ==
The EuroLeague 2010–2020 All-Decade Team consisted of basketball players named to the EuroLeague's All-Decade Team, for the second 10 years of the EuroLeague Commercial Assets (ECA)'s competition, from 2010–20.

There were 50 players nominated for the All-Decade Team. Voting included votes from selected media members and fans.

== All-25 EuroLeague Team ==
The All-25 EuroLeague Team was selected in 2025, in order to mark the 25th anniversary of the EuroLeague Commercial Assets (ECA)'s control and organization of the EuroLeague competition.

== FIBA European Selection Team ==
The FIBA European Selection Team, was an individual honor from FIBA Europe, for the top 10 players in European club basketball, from 1964 to 1996, during the era when FIBA was organizing the EuroLeague.

== FIBA Europe All-Star Game ==
The FIBA Europe All-Star Game was the all-star basketball game, which was also known as the "FIBA Europe Festival". The "FIBA Europe Festival All-Star Game" was held from 1964 to 1996. It was organized by FIBA Europe, during the era when FIBA organized the EuroLeague.

== FIBA EuroStars ==
FIBA EuroStars was an annual All-Star Game showcase of the sport of European professional club basketball. It was organized by FIBA Europe, during the era when FIBA organized the EuroLeague.

== FIBA SuproLeague awards ==
There were two major European club basketball competitions in the 2000–01 season, the 2000–01 EuroLeague, and the FIBA SuproLeague 2000–01. After the 2000–01 season ended, the EuroLeague took over the FIBA SuproLeague and absorbed it. As part of the agreement, the championship and player awards won in the SuproLeague were to be kept as records by the EuroLeague. For example, Nate Huffman won the Player of the Year award of that season's FIBA SuproLeague, however, he did not play in the EuroLeague competition at all that season.

=== FIBA SuproLeague Player of the Year ===
- 2000–01 (United States) Nate Huffman (Maccabi Tel Aviv) (FIBA SuproLeague)*^{[c]}

=== FIBA SuproLeague Final Four MVP ===
- 2000–01 (United States) (Slovenia) Ariel McDonald (Maccabi Tel Aviv) (FIBA SuproLeague)*^{[c]}

=== FIBA SuproLeague Top Scorer ===
- 2000–01 (Federal Republic of Yugoslavia) Miroslav Berić (Partizan) (FIBA SuproLeague)*^{[c]}

=== FIBA SuproLeague Finals Top Scorer ===
- 2000–01 (Federal Republic of Yugoslavia) Dejan Bodiroga (Panathinaikos) (FIBA SuproLeague)*^{[c]}

=== FIBA SuproLeague All-Final Four Team ===
FIBA SuproLeague All-Final Four Team
Year	Player	Team	Ref
2001	(Federal Republic of Yugoslavia) Dejan Bodiroga	Panathinaikos	
2001	(United States) Nate Huffman	Maccabi Tel Aviv	
2001	(Russia) Andrei Kirilenko	CSKA Moscow	
2001	(United States) (Slovenia) Ariel McDonald (Final Four MVP)	Maccabi Tel Aviv	
2001	(United States) Anthony Parker	Maccabi Tel Aviv	

== See also ==
- EuroCup Basketball Awards (2nd-tier level)
- FIBA Basketball Champions League Awards (3rd-tier level)

== Notes ==
- ^{a} There were two officially recognized first tier European club basketball competitions during the 2000–01 season. The FIBA SuproLeague 2000–01, and EuroLeague Basketball 2000–01. McDonald was the MVP of the 2001 FIBA SuproLeague Final Four.
- ^{b} There were two officially recognized first tier European club basketball competitions during the 2000–01 season. The FIBA SuproLeague 2000–01, and EuroLeague Basketball 2000–01. Ginóbili was the MVP of the 2001 EuroLeague Finals.
- ^{c} There were two officially recognized first tier European club basketball competitions during the 2000–01 season. The FIBA SuproLeague 2000–01, and EuroLeague Basketball 2000–01. Huffman was the MVP of the FIBA SuproLeague competition that season.
- ^{d} There were two officially recognized first tier European club basketball competitions during the 2000–01 season. The FIBA SuproLeague 2000–01, and EuroLeague Basketball 2000–01. Tomašević was the MVP of the EuroLeague Basketball competition that season.
