= EuroLeague Legend =

Basketball award

EuroLeague Legend or EuroLeague Legends, is an award for the sport of basketball, that is given by the EuroLeague Commercial Assets (ECA), which is the organizing and governing body of the EuroLeague, which is the top-tier level professional basketball competition in Europe. It is a Hall of Fame award, that is awarded only to a very distinct and small group of the greatest of all-time EuroLeague players, head coaches, and executives, who are honored from time-to-time, for their outstanding playing, coaching, and front-office careers in the league. To which, the EuroLeague's organizing body, the ECA, sees fit to officially designate them as "EuroLeague Legends".

EuroLeague Legends may be officially designated either during or after their playing, coaching, or administrative careers. All players, head coaches, and executives, who have been active in the EuroLeague at any given time, are eligible for the EuroLeague Legend designation. Currently, the EuroLeague Legend designation has only been given to nine players, one head coach, and one team executive.

== Award winners ==
=== Players ===
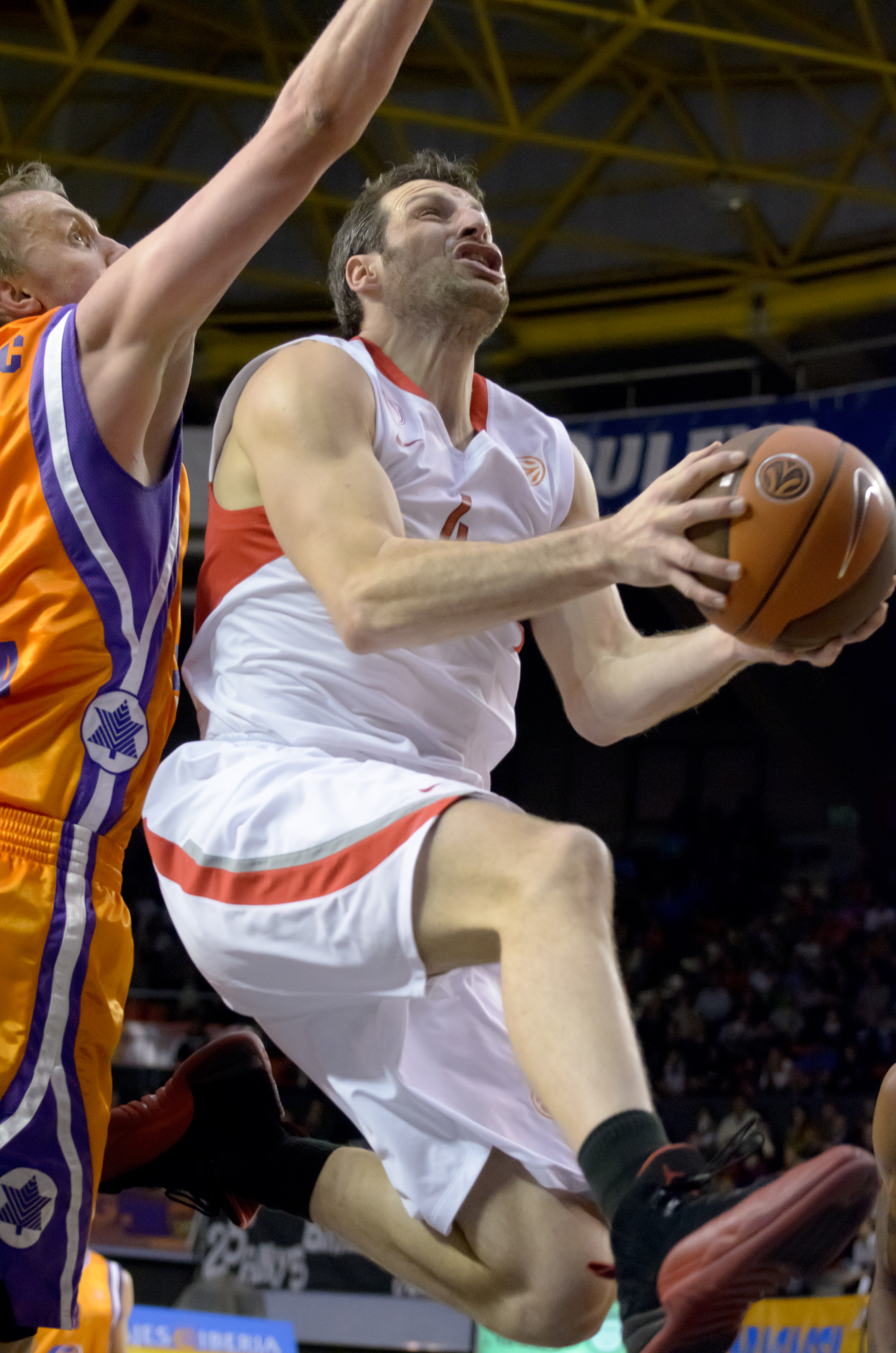
Theo Papaloukas, in white, with the ball, as an Olympiacos player, 2011.

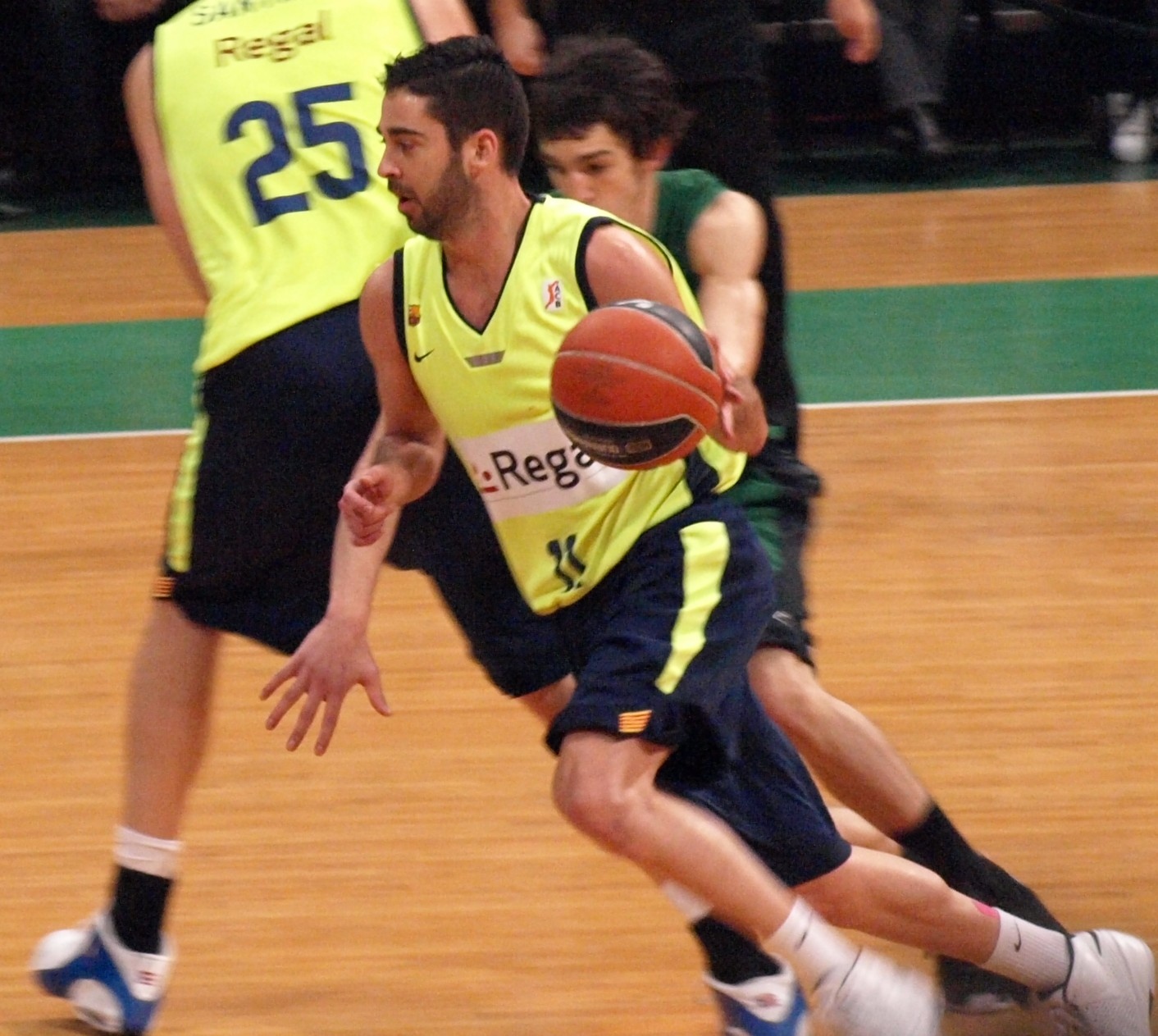
J.C. Navarro, in yellow, with the ball, as a FC Barcelona player, 2009.

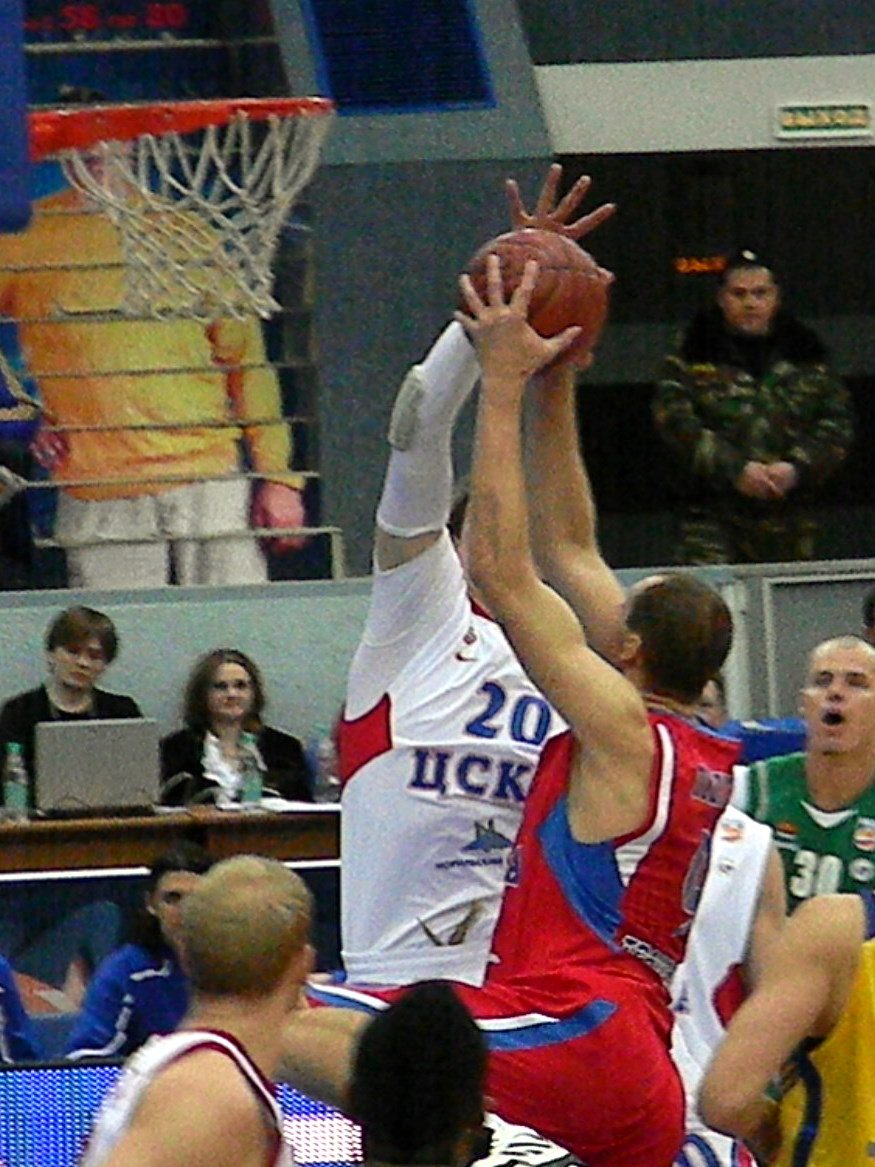
Ramūnas Šiškauskas in red, with the ball, during the 2011 Russian PBL All-Star Game.

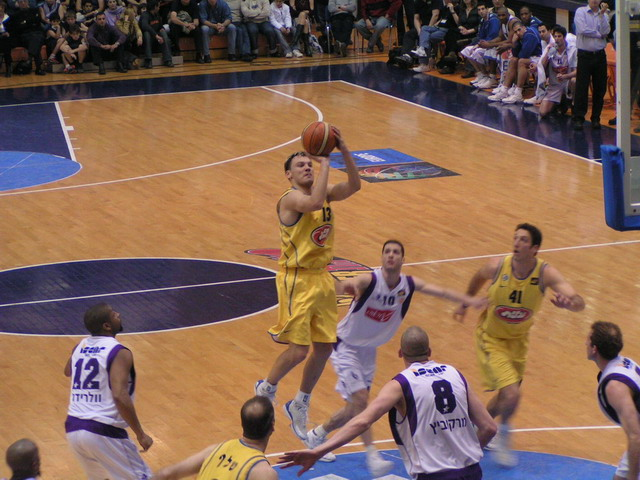
Šarūnas Jasikevičius, in yellow, with the ball, as a Maccabi player, 2003.

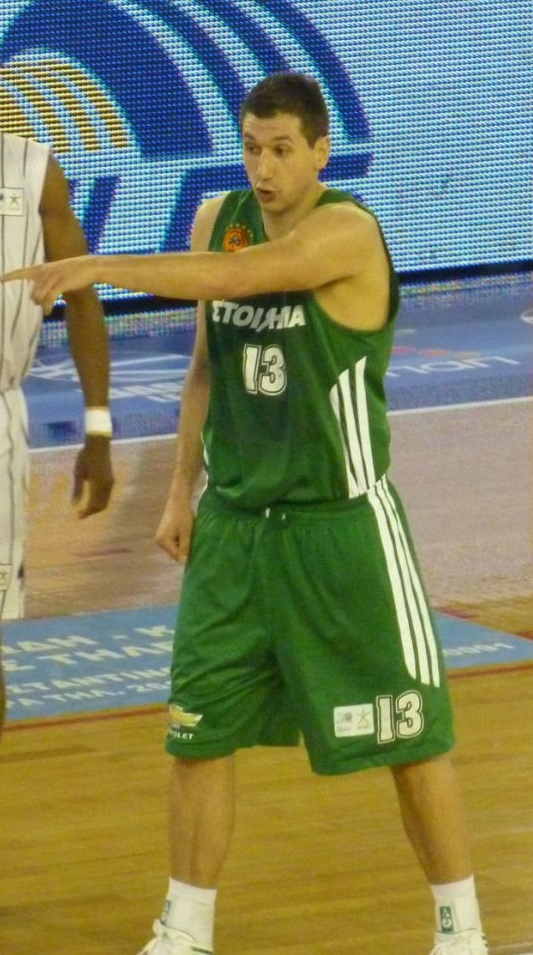
Dimitris Diamantidis, in green, as a Panathinaikos player, 2013.

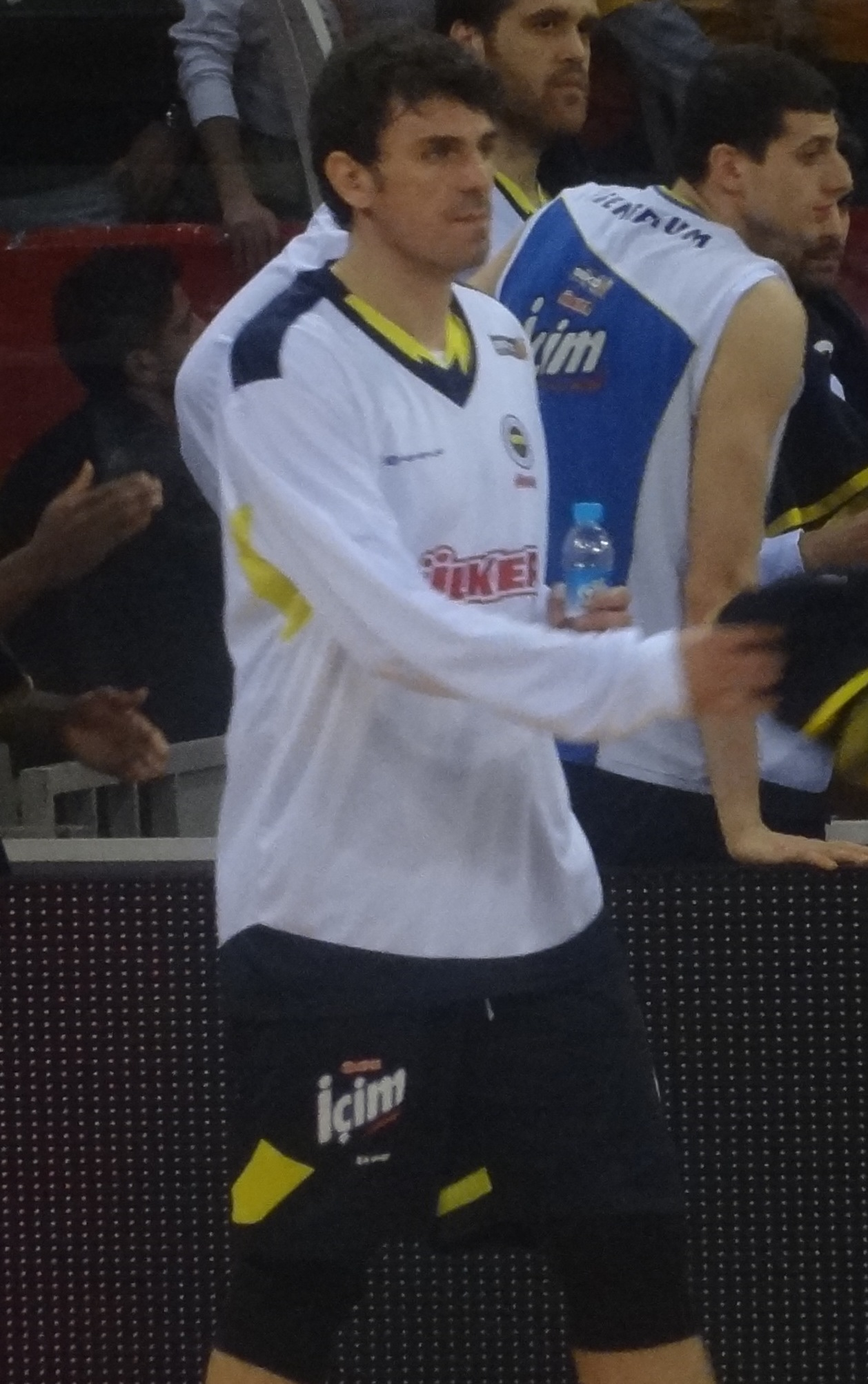
Mirsad Türkcan, as a Fenerbahçe Ülker player, 2012.

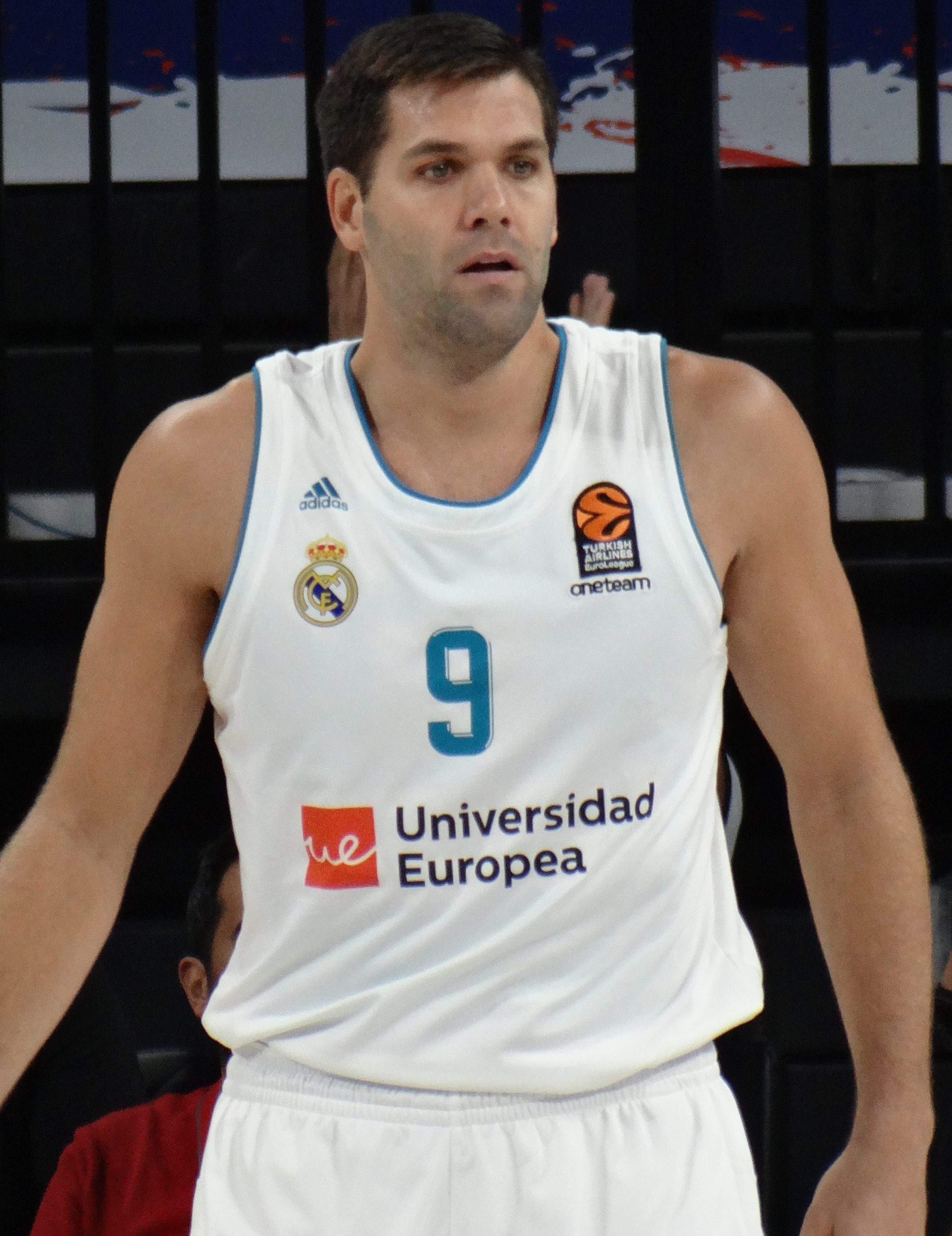
Felipe Reyes, as a Real Madrid player, 2017.

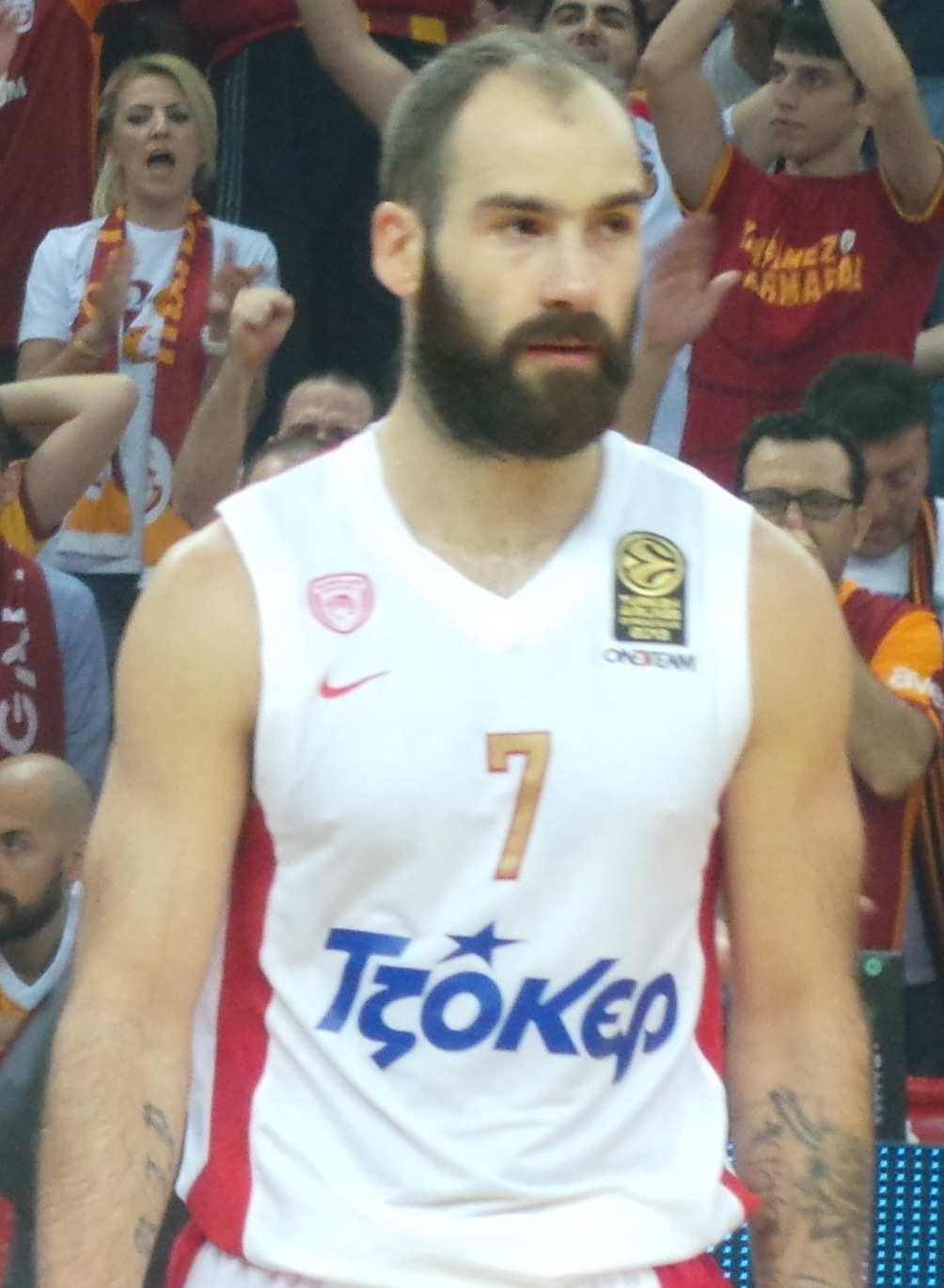
Vassilis Spanoulis, as an Olympiacos player, 2013.

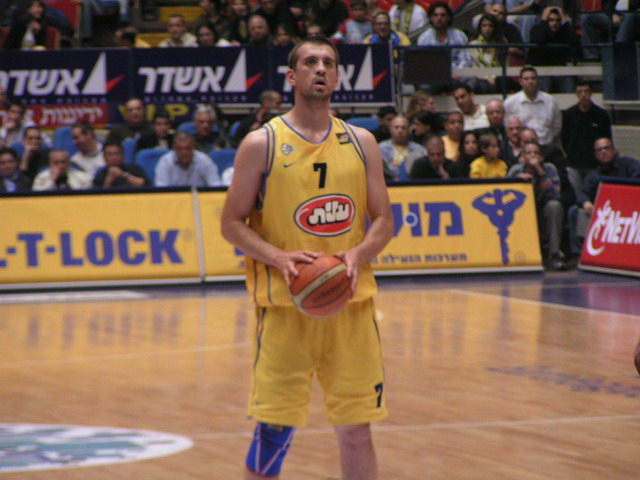
Nikola Vujčić, as a Maccabi player, 2003.

EuroLeague Legend	Position	Playing Career	Date Honored	Status	Reference
(Greece) Theo Papaloukas	PG	1995–2013	December 12, 2013	Retired	
(Spain) Juan Carlos Navarro	SG	1997–2018	March 14, 2014	Retired	
(Lithuania) Ramūnas Šiškauskas	SG/SF	1996–2012	May 16, 2014	Retired	
(Lithuania) Šarūnas Jasikevičius	PG	1998–2014	February 12, 2015	Retired	
(Greece) Dimitris Diamantidis	PG	1999–2016	April 1, 2016	Retired	
(Turkey) Mirsad Türkcan	PF	1994–2012	May 19, 2017	Retired	
(Spain) Felipe Reyes	PF/C	1998–2021	Feb 19, 2022	Retired	
(Greece) Vassilis Spanoulis	PG/SG	1999–2021	Apr 20, 2022	Retired	
(Croatia) Nikola Vujčić	PF/C	1995–2013	Dec 6, 2022	Retired	

==== Major EuroLeague accomplishments ====
EuroLeague Legend	Major EuroLeague Accomplishments
(Greece) Theo Papaloukas	2× EuroLeague Champion: (2006, 2008); EuroLeague MVP: (2007); EuroLeague Final Four MVP: (2006); EuroLeague Finals Top Scorer: (2007); 2× EuroLeague Assists Leader: (2007, 2009); 4× All-EuroLeague Team: (2006–2009); 1× EuroLeague MVP of the Month; 1× EuroLeague MVP of the Round; EuroLeague 2000–2010 All-Decade Team: (2010); 50 Greatest EuroLeague Contributors: (2008)
(Spain) Juan Carlos Navarro	2× EuroLeague Champion: (2003, 2010); EuroLeague MVP: (2009); EuroLeague Final Four MVP: (2010); EuroLeague Finals Top Scorer: (2010); 7× All-EuroLeague Team: (2006, 2007, 2009–2013); 3× EuroLeague MVP of the Month; 3× EuroLeague MVP of the Round; EuroLeague 2000–2010 All-Decade Team: (2010); EuroLeague 2010–2020 All-Decade Team: (2020)
(Lithuania) Ramūnas Šiškauskas	2× EuroLeague Champion: (2007, 2008); EuroLeague MVP: (2008); 4× All-EuroLeague Team: (2007–2010); 2× EuroLeague MVP of the Month; 3× EuroLeague MVP of the Round; EuroLeague 2000–2010 All-Decade Team: (2010)
(Lithuania) Šarūnas Jasikevičius	4× EuroLeague Champion: (2003–2005, 2009); EuroLeague Final Four MVP: (2005); EuroLeague Finals Top Scorer: (2005); 2× All-EuroLeague Team: (2004, 2005); 2× EuroLeague MVP of the Round; EuroLeague 2000–2010 All-Decade Team: (2010); 50 Greatest EuroLeague Contributors: (2008)
(Greece) Dimitris Diamantidis	3× EuroLeague Champion: (2007, 2009, 2011); EuroLeague MVP: (2011); 2× EuroLeague Final Four MVP: (2007, 2011); 4× All-EuroLeague Team: (2007, 2011–2013); 6× EuroLeague Best Defender: (2005–2009, 2011); 2× EuroLeague Assists Leader: (2011, 2014); 2× EuroLeague MVP of the Month; 5× EuroLeague MVP of the Round; EuroLeague 2000–2010 All-Decade Team: (2010); EuroLeague 2010–2020 All-Decade Team: (2020)
(Turkey) Mirsad Türkcan	EuroLeague Regular Season MVP: (2002); EuroLeague Top 16 MVP: (2003); 3× All-EuroLeague Team: (2002–2004); 5× EuroLeague Rebound Leader: (2002, 2003, 2006, 2009, 2011); 10× EuroLeague MVP of the Round
(Spain) Felipe Reyes	2× EuroLeague Champion: (2015, 2018); 1× All-EuroLeague Team: (2015); 4× EuroLeague MVP of the Round
(Greece) Vassilis Spanoulis	3× EuroLeague Champion: (2009, 2012, 2013); EuroLeague MVP: (2013); 3× EuroLeague Final Four MVP: (2009, 2012, 2013); EuroLeague Finals Top Scorer: (2013); 3× EuroLeague Final Four Top Scorer: (2009, 2012, 2013); 8× All-EuroLeague Team: (2006, 2009, 2011–2015, 2018); 3× EuroLeague MVP of the Month; 8× EuroLeague MVP of the Round; EuroLeague 2010–2020 All-Decade Team: (2020); EuroLeague 2010–2020 Player of the Decade: (2020)
(Croatia) Nikola Vujčić	2× EuroLeague Champion: (2004, 2005); 5× All-EuroLeague Team: (2003–2007); 4× EuroLeague MVP of the Round; EuroLeague 2000–2010 All-Decade Team: (2010)

=== Head coaches ===
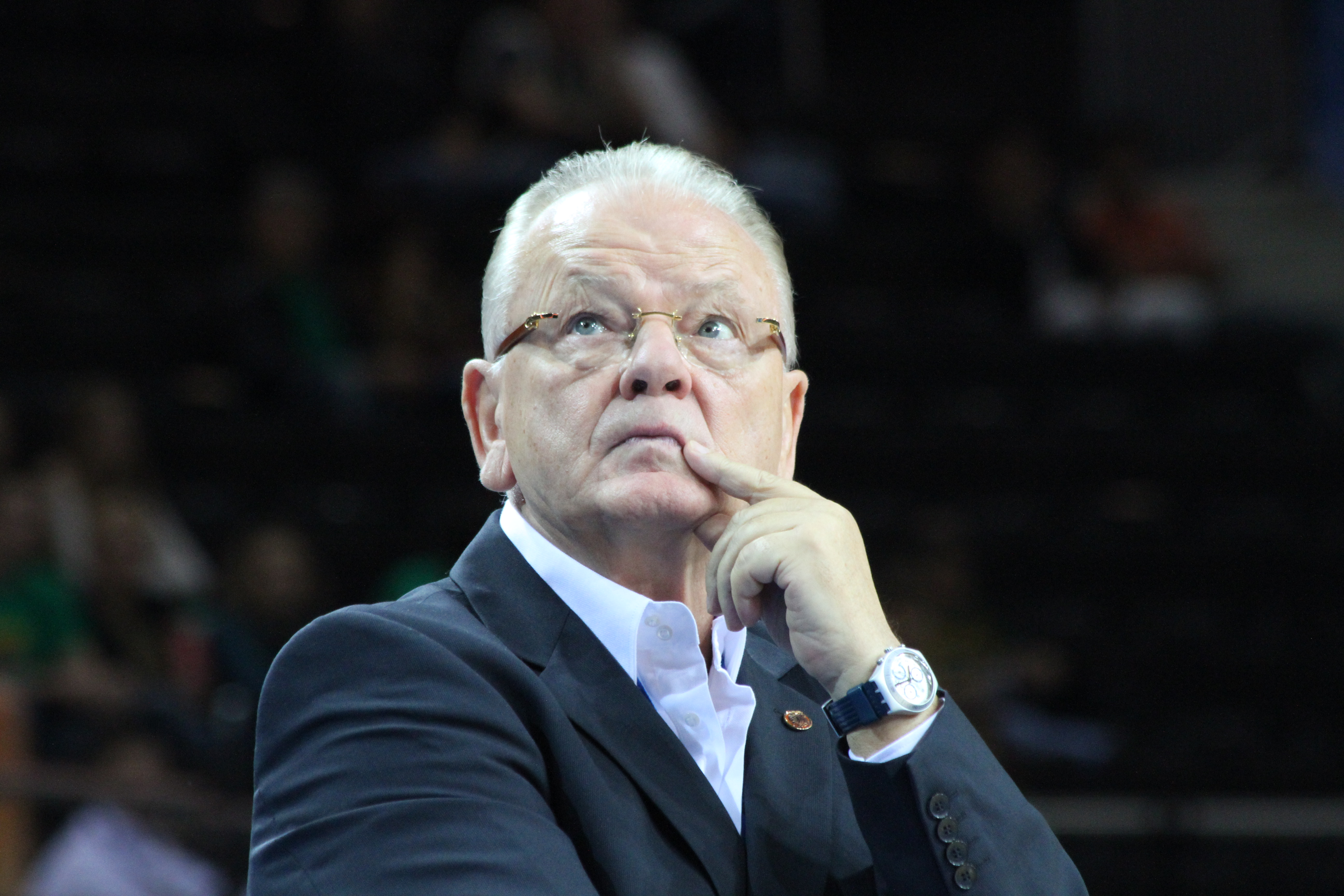
Dušan Ivković, while coaching, in 2011.

EuroLeague Legend	Career	Date Honored	Status	Major EuroLeague Accomplishments	Reference
(Serbia) Dušan Ivković	1978–2016	September 20, 2017	Retired	2× EuroLeague Champion: (1997, 2012); EuroLeague Coach of the Year: (2012); 50 Greatest EuroLeague Contributors: (2008)	

=== Executives ===
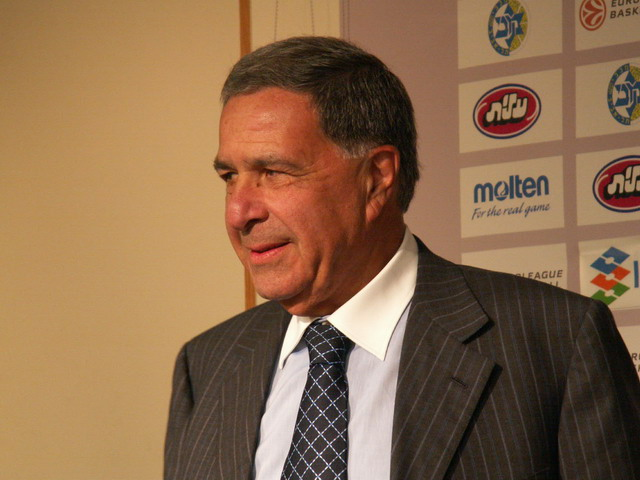
Shimon Mizrahi, in 2006.

EuroLeague Legend	Role	Date Honored	Major EuroLeague Accomplishments	Reference
(Israel) Shimon Mizrahi	Club executive	November 27, 2018	6× European Club Champion: 5× EuroLeague Champion: (1977, 1981, 2004, 2005, 2014); FIBA SuproLeague Champion: (2001)*	

* The 2000–01 season was a transition year, with the best European basketball teams split into two different major leagues: The SuproLeague, held by FIBA, and the EuroLeague, held by EuroLeague Commercial Assets (ECA). The 2001 FIBA SuproLeague title is also recognized by the EuroLeague.

== See also ==
- 50 Greatest EuroLeague Contributors (2008)
- EuroLeague 2000–2010 All-Decade Team
- EuroLeague 2010–2020 All-Decade Team
- EuroLeague 25th Anniversary Team
- Olympic Order
- FIBA's 50 Greatest Players (1991)
- FIBA Order of Merit
- FIBA Hall of Fame
