= Artūras Karnišovas =

Lithuanian basketball executive and former player (born 1971)

Personal information
- Born: April 27, 1971 (age 55) Klaipėda, then part of Lithuanian SSR, Soviet Union
- Listed height: 2.04 m (6 ft 8 in)
- Listed weight: 103 kg (227 lb)

Career information
- College: Seton Hall (1990–1994)
- NBA draft: 1994: undrafted
- Playing career: 1987–2002
- Position: Small forward

Career history
- 1987–1990: Statyba Vilnius
- 1994–1995: Cholet
- 1995–1997: FC Barcelona (Note: Team was known as FC Barcelona Banca Catalana (1994–1997) for sponsorship reasons.)
- 1997–1998: Olympiacos Piraeus
- 1998–2000: Fortitudo Bologna (Note: Team was known as Teamsystem Bologna (1995–1999) and Paf Wennington Bologna (1999–2001) for sponsorship reasons.)
- 2000–2002: FC Barcelona

Career highlights
- As player: FIBA European League Player of the Year (1996); FIBA European Selection (1995); 3× FIBA EuroStar (1997–1999); FIBA EuroStars MVP (1997); 3× Spanish League champion (1996, 1997, 2001); Spanish King's Cup winner (2001); 3× Spanish League All-Star (1996, 2001 I, 2001 II); Italian League champion (2000); Italian Supercup winner (1998); Greek League All-Star (1997); 2× First-team All-Big East (1993, 1994); Haggerty Award (1994)
Medals
Men's basketball
Representing Lithuania
Summer Olympics
Bronze medal – third place	1992 Barcelona
Bronze medal – third place	1996 Atlanta
EuroBasket
Silver medal – second place	1995 Greece

Artūras Karnišovas (born April 27, 1971) is a Lithuanian professional basketball executive and former player. He most recently served as the executive vice president of basketball operations of the Chicago Bulls of the National Basketball Association (NBA) from 2020 to 2026.

== Early life and college career ==
Karnišovas was born in Klaipėda to Mykolas, a basketball player, and Irena. Karnišovas started his career in Lithuania, with Statyba Vilnius, while in high school, and played there until 1990. His father also played for Statyba and they are the only father-son duo to play for the team at some point in their careers. Expressing an interest in playing and studying in the United States, Karnišovas earned an invitation to play college basketball at Seton Hall University following a recommendation of Šarūnas Marčiulionis to Seton Hall head coach P. J. Carlesimo during the 1990 FIBA World Championship. Karnišovas was the first player from the USSR to play in an American college, and arrived there without knowing a single word of English. In four years playing for the Seton Hall Pirates, Karnišovas helped the team win two Big East tournaments and qualify for the NCAA tournament four straight times, being the only player to start for all squads.

== Professional playing career ==
After trying and failing to draw interest from a National Basketball Association (NBA) team, Karnišovas began playing overseas. His former college coach, P. J. Carlesimo, attributed his inability to play in North America to insufficient scouting and a more guaranteed financial return in Europe. Karnišovas is one of the few players to have played in Europe's four strongest national domestic league championships, Spain (for FC Barcelona), Italy (Fortitudo Bologna), Greece (Olympiacos Piraeus), and France (Cholet). He reached the EuroLeague's EuroLeague Final Four three times, and led the 1998–99 EuroLeague season in free throw percentage (89.6%). He was chosen as FIBA European League Player of the Year in 1996, by FIBA Basket magazine.

== National team career ==
At the youth level, Karnišovas represented the Soviet Union under-16 national team at the 1987 FIBA European Championship for Cadets.

At the senior level, Karnišovas helped lead the Lithuania national team to consecutive bronze medals at the Summer Olympics in 1992 and 1996. He also played at the 1998 FIBA World Championship. He also played at the 1995 EuroBasket, where he won a silver medal, at the 1997 EuroBasket, and at the 1999 EuroBasket.

== Post-playing career ==
Karnišovas worked for the National Basketball Association's basketball operations office from 2003 to 2008, and afterwards became an international scout for the Houston Rockets for five years, while also directing the Adidas Eurocamp—a preparation tournament for European players picked in the NBA draft—in 2011 and 2012.

On July 16, 2013, he became the assistant general manager of the Denver Nuggets.

Karnišovas was considered one of the top candidates to be the new general manager for the Brooklyn Nets in 2016. In 2017, Karnišovas emerged as one of the candidates for the general manager position for the Milwaukee Bucks. On June 6, 2017, he remained as one of their three last original candidates, along with Wes Wilcox and Justin Zanik. On June 13, 2017, it was announced that only Karnišovas and the Bucks' interim general manager Zanik remained as top candidates for the position. Two days later, on June 15, 2017, the Nuggets made Karnišovas their new general manager, with Tim Connelly moving up to become the team's president of basketball operations. The Bucks would eventually promote their director of basketball operations, Jon Horst, for their vacant general manager position instead. His first notable signing as a general manager was a multi-year contract with Paul Millsap on July 13, 2017. On February 15, 2019, Karnišovas signed a multi-year contract extension with the Nuggets.

On April 13, 2020, Karnišovas was named executive vice president of basketball operations by the Chicago Bulls. In May 2022, Karnišovas was voted second/third best executive of the NBA. On April 6, 2026, he was fired along with Bulls general manager Marc Eversley.

== Personal life ==
Karnišovas is married to Gina, whom he met at Seton Hall, and they live in Chicago, with their two sons. The family previously resided in North Jersey and Englewood, Colorado.

== Awards and achievements ==
=== College ===
- Haggerty Award – 1994

=== Professional ===
- FIBA European Selection – 1995
- EuroLeague Finals Top Scorer – 1996
- EuroLeague All-Final Four Team – 1996
- 3× Spanish League champion – 1996, 1997, 2001
- FIBA European League Player of the Year – 1996
- 3× Spanish League All-Star – 1996, 2001 I, 2001 II
- FIBA EuroStars MVP – 1997
- 3× FIBA EuroStar – 1997, 1998, 1999
- FIBA EuroStars MVP – 1997
- McDonald's Championship finalist – 1997
- Greek League All-Star – 1997
- Italian Supercup winner – 1998
- FIBA EuroStars Top Scorer – 1999
- Italian League champion – 2000
- Spanish King's Cup winner – 2001

=== Lithuania national team ===
- 2× Summer Olympics:
  - Bronze – 1992, 1996
- EuroBasket:
  - Silver – 1995

=== State awards ===
- Lithuania – recipient of the Officer's Cross of the Order of the Lithuanian Grand Duke Gediminas (1995)
- Lithuania – recipient of the Commander's Grand Cross of the Order of the Lithuanian Grand Duke Gediminas (1996)

== Filmography ==
Year	Title	Role	Notes	Ref
2004	Lietuvos Krepšinis 1920–2004	Himself	Documentary about basketball in Lithuania in 1920–2004.	
2012	The Other Dream Team	Himself	Documentary about the Lithuania men's national basketball team at the 1992 Summer Olympics.	
