= EuroLeague 2010–2020 All-Decade Team =

Basketball team

The EuroLeague 2010–2020 All-Decade Team consisted of 10 basketball players that were awarded and named to the EuroLeague's All-Decade Team, in recognition of the second decade of the league's competition under the organization of EuroLeague Basketball, between the years 2010 and 2020.

== EuroLeague 2010–2020 All-Decade Team nominees ==
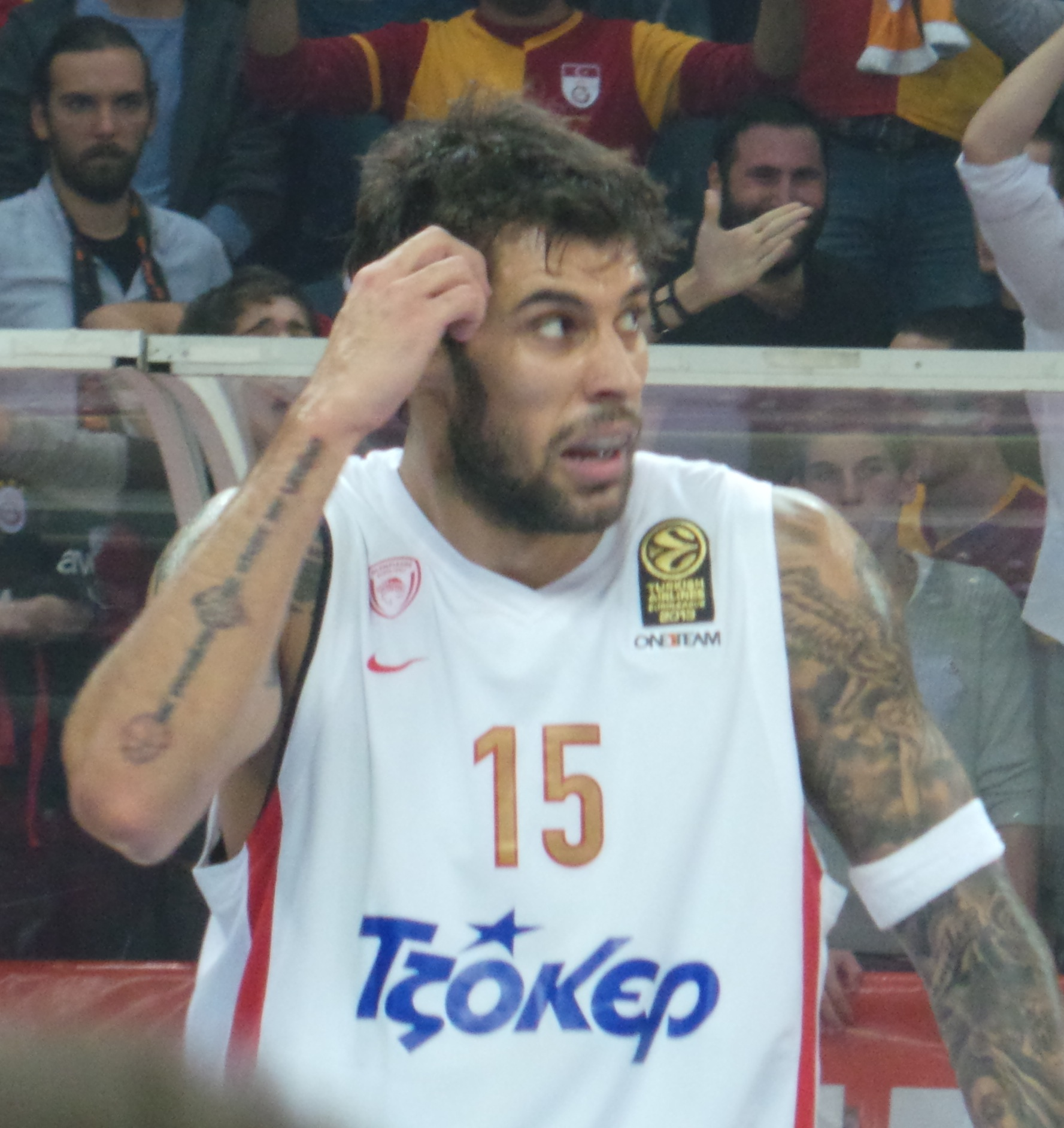
Georgios Printezis

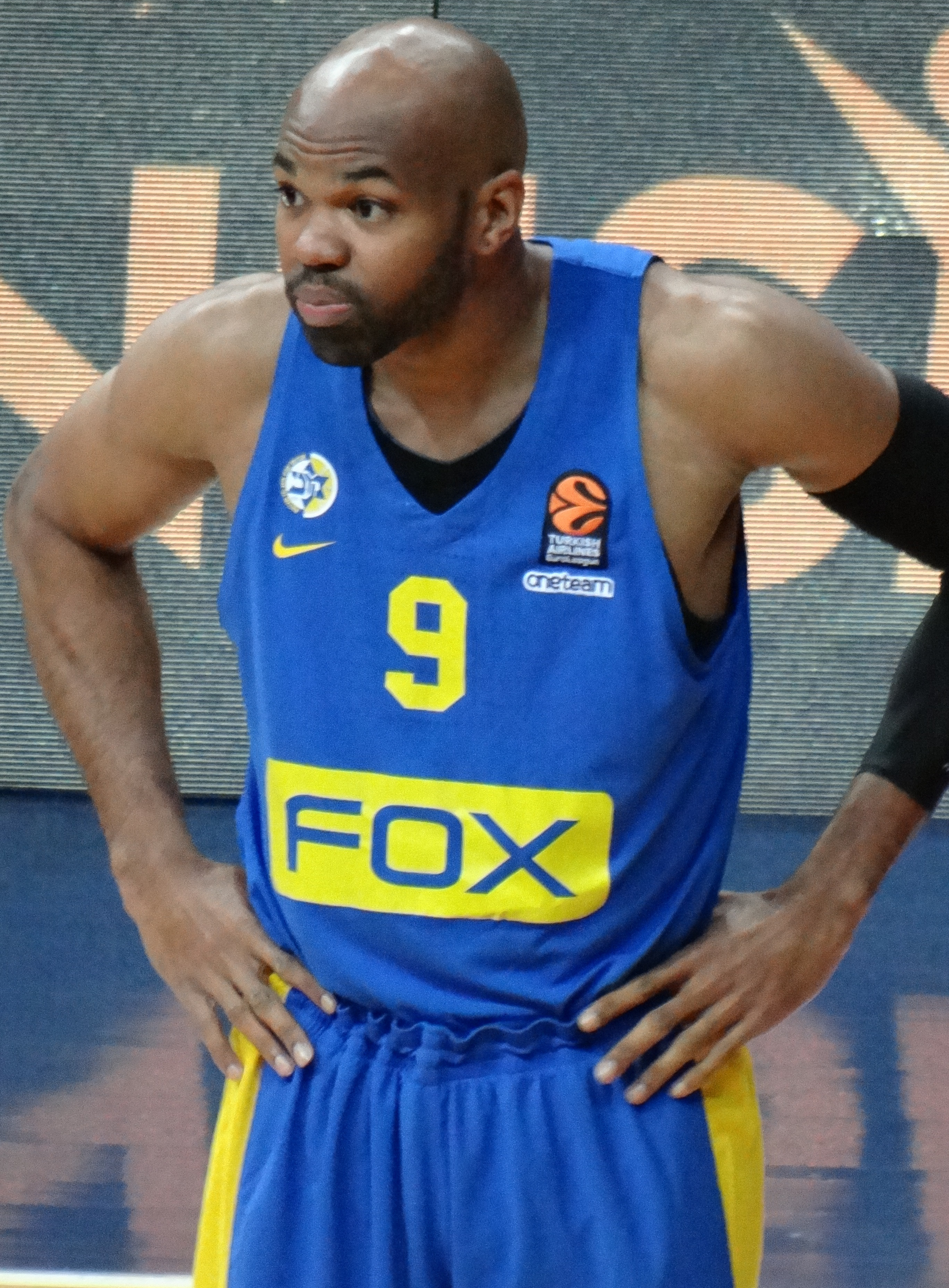
Alex Tyus

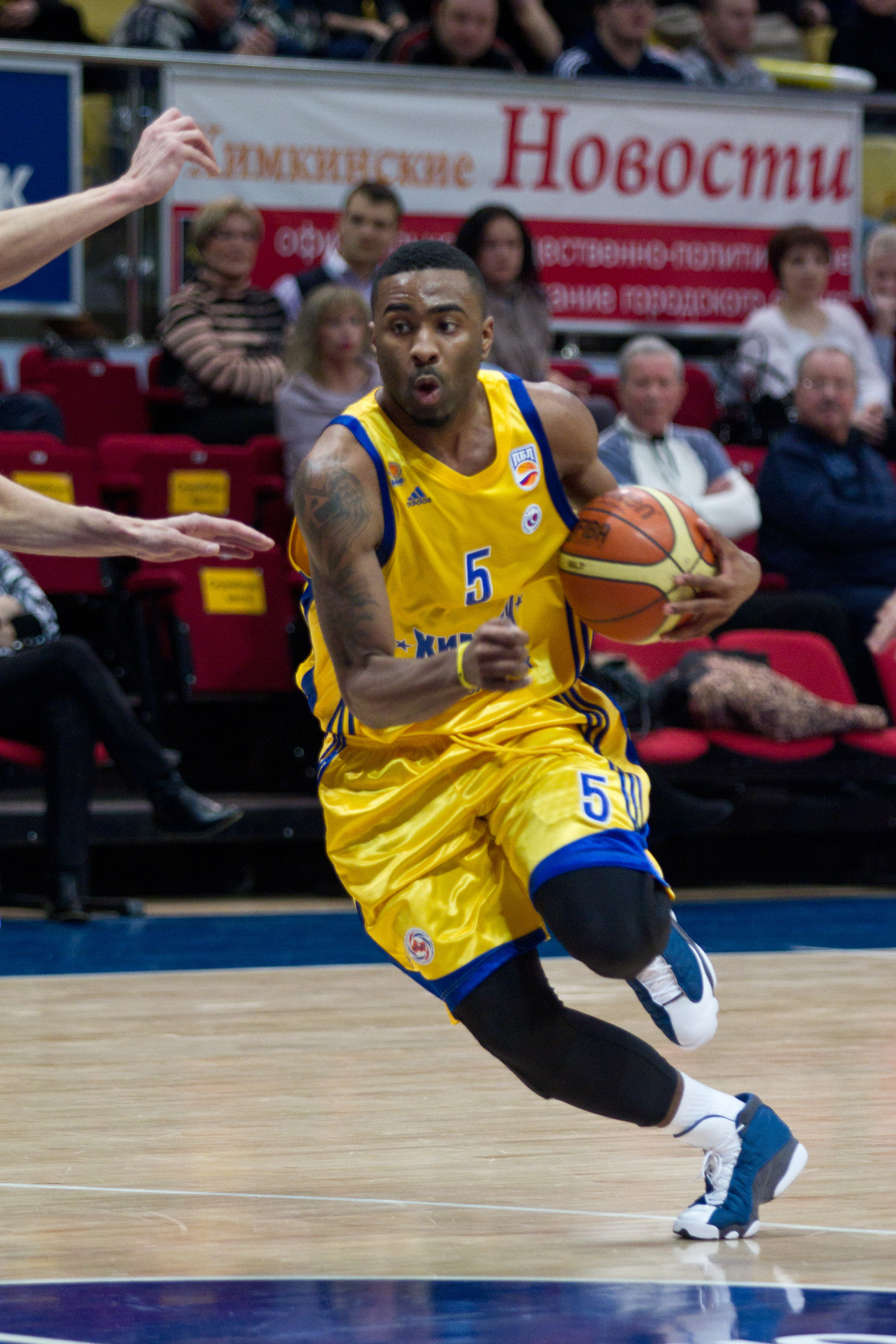
Keith Langford

There were 50 nominated players for the All-Decade Team. Voting included votes from selected media members and fans, as well as the league's 18 current (at the moment) head coaches and 18 current (at the moment) team-captains. (Players listed in bold were selected to the All-Decade Team)

Primary position	Name	EuroLeague Team(s) and played (years)	Ref.
PF	(Russia) Victor Khryapa	(Russia) CSKA Moscow (2002–2004, 2007–2018)	
PF	(Greece) **Georgios Printezis**	(Greece) Olympiacos (2002–2009, 2011–2020) (Spain) Unicaja Málaga (2009–2011)	
PG	(Greece) Kostas Sloukas	(Greece) Olympiacos (2009–2010, 2011–2015) (Turkey) Fenerbahçe (2015–2020)	
SF	(United States) Devin Smith	(Turkey) Fenerbahçe (2008–2009) (Israel) Maccabi Tel Aviv (2011–2017)	
SF	(Spain) Rudy Fernández	(Spain) Joventut Badalona (2006–2007) (Spain) Real Madrid (2011–2020)	
C	(United States) Michael Batiste	(Belgium) Spirou Charleroi (2000–2001) (Greece) Panathinaikos (2003–2012, 2013–2014) (Turkey) Fenerbahçe (2012–2013)	
SG	(United States) Cory Higgins	(Russia) CSKA Moscow (2015–2019) (Spain) Barcelona (2019–2020)	
C	(Croatia) Ante Tomić	(Spain) Real Madrid (2009–2012) (Spain) Barcelona (2012–2020)	
C	(Greece) Ioannis Bourousis	(Greece) AEK (2002–2006) (Greece) Olympiacos (2006–2011) (Italy) Emporio Armani (2011–2013) (Spain) Real Madrid (2013–2015) (Spain) Saski Baskonia (2015–2016) (Greece) Panathinaikos (2016–2017)	
SF	(Italy) Luigi Datome	(Italy) Montepaschi Siena (2004–2006) (Italy) Virtus Roma (2008–2011) (Turkey) Fenerbahçe (2015–2020)	
C	(Serbia) Nenad Krstić	(Serbia) Partizan (2001–2004) (Russia) CSKA Moscow (2011–2014) (Turkey) Anadolu Efes (2014–2015)	
SG	(Russia) Alexey Shved	(Russia) CSKA Moscow (2006–2012) (Russia) Khimki (2015–2020)	
SG	(Spain) **Juan Carlos Navarro**	(Spain) Barcelona (2000–2007, 2008–2018)	
PG	(Montenegro) (United States) Tyrese Rice	(Israel) Maccabi Tel Aviv (2013–2014) (Russia) Khimki (2015–2016) (Spain) Barcelona (2016–2017) (Greece) Panathinaikos (2019–2020)	
SG	(Azerbaijan) (United States) Jaycee Carroll	(Spain) Real Madrid (2011–2020)	
SF	(United States) Sonny Weems	(Lithuania) Žalgiris (2011–2012) (Russia) CSKA Moscow (2012–2015) (Israel) Maccabi Tel Aviv (2016–2017) (Turkey) Anadolu Efes (2017–2018)	
PF	(Spain) Felipe Reyes	(Spain) Estudiantes (2000–2001) (Spain) Real Madrid (2004–2020)	
PG	(Greece) Nick Calathes	(Greece) Panathinaikos (2009–2012, 2015–2020)	
PF	(Georgia (country)) Tornike Shengelia	(Belgium) Charleroi (2011–2012) (Spain) Saski Baskonia (2014–2020)	
SG	(France) **Nando de Colo**	(Spain) Valencia Basket (2010–2011) (Russia) CSKA Moscow (2014–2019) (Turkey) Fenerbahçe (2019–2020)	
PF	(Russia) Andrei Kirilenko	(Russia) CSKA Moscow (2011–2012, 2014–2015)	
C	(Israel) (United States) Alex Tyus	(Italy) Cantù (2012–2013) (Israel) Maccabi Tel Aviv (2013–2015, 2017–2019) (Turkey) Anadolu Efes (2015–2016) (Turkey) Galatasaray (2016–2017)	
PG	(Spain) **Sergio Llull**	(Spain) Real Madrid (2007–2020)	
PG	(Greece) **Dimitris Diamantidis**	(Greece) Panathinaikos (2004–2016)	
C	(United States) Bryant Dunston	(Greece) Olympiacos (2013–2015) (Turkey) Anadolu Efes (2015–2020)	
PF	(Lithuania) Paulius Jankūnas	(Lithuania) Žalgiris (2003–2009, 2010–2020) (Russia) Khimki (2009–2010)	
SG	(Slovenia) **Luka Dončić**	(Spain) Real Madrid (2015–2018)	
SF	(United States) Will Clyburn	(Turkey) Darüşşafaka (2016–2017) (Russia) CSKA Moscow (2017–2020)	
C	(Nigeria) Ekpe Udoh	(Turkey) Fenerbahçe (2015–2017)	
SF	(Greece) Kostas Papanikolaou	(Greece) Olympiacos (2009–2013, 2015–2020) (Spain) Barcelona (2013–2014)	
SG	(Serbia) **Bogdan Bogdanović**	(Serbia) Partizan (2012–2014) (Turkey) Fenerbahçe (2014–2017)	
PF	(Slovenia) (United States) Anthony Randolph	(Russia) Lokomotiv Kuban (2015–2016) (Spain) Real Madrid (2016–2020)	
C	(United States) **Kyle Hines**	(Germany) Brose Bamberg (2010–2011) (Greece) Olympiacos (2011–2013) (Russia) CSKA Moscow (2013–2020)	
PF	(Italy) Nicolò Melli	(Italy) Emporio Armani (2010–2015) (Germany) Brose Bamberg (2015–2017) (Turkey) Fenerbahçe (2017–2019)	
PF	(Spain) (Montenegro) Nikola Mirotić	(Spain) Real Madrid (2008–2014) (Spain) Barcelona (2019–2020)	
C	(Mexico) Gustavo Ayón	(Spain) Real Madrid (2014–2019) (Russia) Zenit (2019–2020)	
PG	(Serbia) **Miloš Teodosić**	(Greece) Olympiacos (2007–2011) (Russia) CSKA Moscow (2011–2017)	
PF	(Serbia) Nemanja Bjelica	(Spain) Saski Baskonia (2010–2013) (Turkey) Fenerbahçe (2013–2015)	
PF	(United States) James Gist	(Serbia) Partizan (2010–2011) (Turkey) Fenerbahçe (2011–2012) (Spain) Unicaja Málaga (2012–2013) (Greece) Panathinaikos (2012–2019) (Serbia) Crvena Zvezda (2019–2020)	
PG	(France) Thomas Heurtel	(Spain) Saski Baskonia (2011–2014) (Turkey) Anadolu Efes (2014–2017) (Spain) Barcelona (2017–2020)	
C	(Greece) Sofoklis Schortsanitis	(Greece) Olympiacos (2005–2010) (Israel) Maccabi Tel Aviv (2010–2012, 2013–2015) (Greece) Panathinaikos (2012–2013) (Serbia) Crvena Zvezda (2015–2016)	
SG	(United States) Keith Langford	(Russia) Khimki (2009–2011) (Israel) Maccabi Tel Aviv (2011–2012) (Italy) Emporio Armani (2012–2014) (Russia) UNICS (2014–2017) (Greece) Panathinaikos (2018–2019)	
PF	(North Macedonia) Pero Antić	(Greece) AEK (2001–2005) (Greece) Olympiacos (2011–2013) (Turkey) Fenerbahçe (2015–2017) (Serbia) Crvena Zvezda (2017–2018)	
SF	(Greece) Stratos Perperoglou	(Greece) Panathinaikos (2007–2012) (Greece) Olympiacos (2012–2014) (Turkey) Anadolu Efes (2014–2015) (Spain) Barcelona (2015–2017) (Serbia) Crvena Zvezda (2019–2020)	
PG	(United States) Mike James	(Spain) Saski Baskonia (2014–2016) (Greece) Panathinaikos (2016–2018) (Italy) Emporio Armani (2018–2019) (Russia) CSKA Moscow (2019–2020)	
PF	(Czech Republic) Jan Veselý	(Serbia) Partizan (2008–2011) (Turkey) Fenerbahçe (2014–2020)	
SF	(Argentina) Andrés Nocioni	(Spain) Saski Baskonia (2001–2004, 2012–2014) (Spain) Real Madrid (2014–2017)	
PG	(Greece) **Vassilis Spanoulis**	(Greece) Panathinaikos (2005–2010) (Greece) Olympiacos (2010–2020)	
SF	(United States) Pete Mickeal	(Spain) Saski Baskonia (2007–2009) (Spain) Barcelona (2009–2013)	
PG	(Spain) Sergio Rodríguez	(Spain) Estudiantes (2004–2005) (Spain) Real Madrid (2010–2016) (Russia) CSKA Moscow (2017–2019) (Italy) Emporio Armani (2019–2020)	

== The EuroLeague 2010–2020 All Decade Team ==
EuroLeague 2010–2020 All-Decade Team
Player (Alphabetical Order)	Position	Ref.
(Serbia) Bogdan Bogdanović	SG	
(France) Nando de Colo	SG/PG	
(Greece) Dimitris Diamantidis	PG	
(Slovenia) Luka Dončić	SG/PG	
(United States) Kyle Hines	C	
(Spain) Sergio Llull	PG/SG	
(Spain) Juan Carlos Navarro	SG	
(Greece) Georgios Printezis	PF	
(Greece) Vassilis Spanoulis (POD)	PG	
(Serbia) Miloš Teodosić	PG	

== The All-Decade Team by vote ==
The EuroLeague 2010–2020 All-Decade Team was decided by a vote of EuroLeague head coaches, EuroLeague players, sports journalists that cover the EuroLeague, and fans. The All-Decade Team players were announced one by one, in the ascending order by which they finished in the vote tally. Vassilis Spanoulis was voted the EuroLeague 2010–2020 Player of the Decade.

EuroLeague 2010–2020 All-Decade Team Vote
Player	Finish in the Voting
(Greece) Vassilis Spanoulis (POD)	#1
(Serbia) Bogdan Bogdanović	#2
(Spain) Sergio Llull	#3
(Greece) Georgios Printezis	#4
(France) Nando de Colo	#5
(Serbia) Miloš Teodosić	#6
(Greece) Dimitris Diamantidis	#7
(Slovenia) Luka Dončić	#8
(Spain) Juan Carlos Navarro	#9
(United States) Kyle Hines	#10

== See also ==
- EuroLeague 2000–2010 All-Decade Team
- 50 Greatest EuroLeague Contributors (2008)
- EuroLeague Legends
- Olympic Order
- FIBA's 50 Greatest Players (1991)
- FIBA Order of Merit
- FIBA Hall of Fame
