= EuroLeague 2000–2010 All-Decade Team =

Basketball team

The EuroLeague 2000–2010 All-Decade Team consisted of 10 basketball players that were awarded and named to the EuroLeague's All-Decade Team, in recognition of the first 10 years of the league's competition, after coming under the control of the Euroleague Basketball Company competition, between the years 2000 and 2010. The EuroLeague is Europe's premier level men's professional club basketball league.

There were 50 players nominated for the All-Decade Team. Voting included votes from selected media members and fans.

== EuroLeague 2000–2010 All-Decade Team 50 nominees ==
- The 50 nominees that were nominated for the All-Decade Team were:
- (Players listed in **bold** were selected to the 10 man All-Decade Team)

EuroLeague 2000–2010 All-Decade Team 50 Nominees
| Player | Primary Position |
|---|---|
| (Greece) Fragiskos Alvertis | SF |
| (Australia) / (Denmark) David Andersen | C |
| (Italy) Gianluca Basile | SG |
| (United States) Maceo Baston | PF |
| (United States) Mike Batiste | C |
| (United States) Tanoka Beard | C |
| (Slovenia) / (Italy) Sani Bečirovič | SG |
| (United States) Elmer Bennett | PG |
| (United States) Joseph Blair | C |
| (Serbia) **Dejan Bodiroga** | SF |
| (United States) Marcus Brown | SG |
| (United States) Louis Bullock | SG |
| (Greece) **Dimitris Diamantidis** | PG |
| (United States) Tyus Edney | PG |
| (United States) Alphonso Ford | SG |
| (Greece) Antonis Fotsis | PF |
| (Slovenia) / (Italy) Gregor Fučka | C |
| (Spain) Jorge Garbajosa | PF |
| (Argentina) / (Italy) Manu Ginóbili | SG |
| (United States) / (Russia) **J. R. Holden** | PG |
| (Serbia) / (Greece) Marko Jarić | PG |
| (Lithuania) **Šarūnas Jasikevičius** | PG |
| (Greece) Michalis Kakiouzis | PF |
| (Turkey) İbrahim Kutluay | SG |
| (Slovenia) Jaka Lakovič | PG |
| (United States) **Trajan Langdon** | SG |
| (Slovenia) Erazem Lorbek | PF |
| (Lithuania) Arvydas Macijauskas | SG |
| (Italy) Denis Marconato | C |
| (United States) Terrell McIntyre | PG |
| (Spain) **Juan Carlos Navarro** | SG |
| (Argentina) / (Italy) Andrés Nocioni | SF |
| (Greece) **Theo Papaloukas** | PG |
| (United States) **Anthony Parker** | SG |
| (Montenegro) / (Serbia) Nikola Peković | C |
| (Argentina) / (Italy) Pablo Prigioni | PG |
| (Serbia) Igor Rakočević | SG |
| (France) Antoine Rigaudeau | PG |
| (Lithuania) Arvydas Sabonis | C |
| (Argentina) Luis Scola | PF |
| (United States) / (Israel) Derrick Sharp | PG |
| (Lithuania) **Ramūnas Šiškauskas** | SF |
| (Slovenia) Matjaž Smodiš | PF |
| (Greece) Vassilis Spanoulis | SG |
| (Brazil) Tiago Splitter | C |
| (Serbia) Dejan Tomašević | C |
| (Turkey) / (Serbia) Mirsad Türkcan | PF |
| (United States) David Vanterpool | SG |
| (Serbia) Miloš Vujanić | PG |
| (Croatia) **Nikola Vujčić** | C |

== The fan's All-Decade Team vote ==
- Worldwide, fans cast more than 125,000 ballots, as well as about 1.25 million online votes. The results of the fan voting were as follows:
- (Players listed in **bold** were selected to the 10 man All-Decade Team)

EuroLeague 2000–2010 All-Decade Team Fan Vote
| Player | Number of Fan Votes |
|---|---|
| (Serbia) **Dejan Bodiroga** | 72,130 votes |
| (Lithuania) **Šarūnas Jasikevičius** | 70,317 votes |
| (Lithuania) **Ramūnas Šiškauskas** | 56,687 votes |
| (Lithuania) Arvydas Sabonis | 47,235 votes |
| (Serbia) Dejan Tomašević | 46,373 votes |
| (Montenegro) / (Serbia) Nikola Peković | 43,777 votes |
| (Serbia) Miloš Vujanić | 40,295 votes |
| (Lithuania) Arvydas Macijauskas | 39,778 votes |
| (United States) Marcus Brown | 39,702 votes |
| (Greece) **Dimitris Diamantidis** | 39,299 votes |

== The EuroLeague 2000–2010 All Decade Team ==
- The All-Decade Team was decided upon by worldwide fan voting, which included more than 125,000 ballots, as well as about 1.25 million online votes, plus 35 media members. Fan voting accounted for 25% of the vote, while media voting accounted for 75% of the vote. The official EuroLeague 2000–2010 All-Decade Team, as voted on by both the fans and the media was:

Dejan Bodiroga was voted the EuroLeague 2000–2010 Player of the Decade.

EuroLeague 2000–2010 All-Decade Team
| Player (Alphabetical Order) | Primary Position |
|---|---|
| (Serbia) **Dejan Bodiroga (POD)** | SF |
| (Greece) **Dimitris Diamantidis** | PG |
| (United States) / (Russia) **J. R. Holden** | PG |
| (Lithuania) **Šarūnas Jasikevičius** | PG |
| (United States) **Trajan Langdon** | SG |
| (Spain) **Juan Carlos Navarro** | SG |
| (Greece) **Theo Papaloukas** | PG |
| (United States) **Anthony Parker** | SG |
| (Lithuania) **Ramūnas Šiškauskas** | SF |
| (Croatia) **Nikola Vujčić** | C |

== See also ==
- EuroLeague 2010–2020 All-Decade Team
- 50 Greatest EuroLeague Contributors (2008)
- EuroLeague Legends
- Olympic Order
- FIBA's 50 Greatest Players (1991)
- FIBA Order of Merit
- FIBA Hall of Fame
