= List of 2022–23 EuroLeague transactions =

This is a list of all personnel changes for the 2022 EuroLeague off-season and 2022–23 EuroLeague season.

== Retirements ==
Date	Name	EuroLeague Team(s) and played (years)	Age	Notes	Ref.
June 4	(Lithuania) Paulius Jankūnas	(Lithuanian Basketball Federation) Žalgiris (2003–2009, 2010–2022); (Russian Basketball Federation) Khimki (2009-2010)	38	All-EuroLeague Second Team (2018); EuroLeague all-time leader in games played; EuroLeague all-time leader in total rebounds	
June 4	(United States) (Azerbaijan) Jaycee Carroll	(Spanish Basketball Federation) Real Madrid (2011–2021)	39	2× EuroLeague champion (2015, 2018)	
June 17	(Greece) Georgios Printezis	(Hellenic Basketball Federation) Olympiacos (2002-2006, 2007-2009, 2011–2022); (Spanish Basketball Federation) Unicaja (2009-2011)	37	2× EuroLeague champion (2012, 2013); All-EuroLeague First Team (2017); EuroLeague 2010–20 All-Decade Team (2020)	
July 10	(Serbia) Vladimir Micov	(Spanish Basketball Federation) Baskonia (2009-2010); (Italian Basketball Federation) Cantù (2011-2012); (Russian Basketball Federation) CSKA Moscow (2012-2014); (Turkish Basketball Federation) Galatasaray (2014-2015, 2016-2017); (Italian Basketball Federation) Olimpia Milano (2017-2021)	37		

== Managerial changes ==
=== Managerial changes ===
Team	Outgoing manager	Manner of departure	Date of vacancy	Position in table	Replaced with	Date of appointment
(Spanish Basketball Federation) Baskonia	(Croatian Basketball Federation) Neven Spahija	Mutual agreement	9 June 2022	Pre-season	(Spanish Basketball Federation) Joan Peñarroya	13 June 2022
(Spanish Basketball Federation) Valencia	(Spanish Basketball Federation) Joan Peñarroya	Signed by Baskonia	12 June 2022	Pre-season	(Spanish Basketball Federation) Álex Mumbrú	13 June 2022
(Hellenic Basketball Federation) Panathinaikos	(Hellenic Basketball Federation) Dimitrios Priftis	Signed by Tofaş	16 June 2022	Pre-season	(Basketball Federation of Montenegro) Dejan Radonjić	30 June 2022
(Turkish Basketball Federation) Fenerbahçe	(Basketball Federation of Serbia) Aleksandar Đorđević	Mutual agreement	17 June 2022	Pre-season	(Hellenic Basketball Federation) Dimitrios Itoudis	19 June 2022
(Israeli Basketball Association) Maccabi Tel Aviv	(Israeli Basketball Association) Avi Even	End of caretaker spell	19 June 2022	Pre-season	(Israeli Basketball Association) Oded Kattash	19 June 2022
(Basketball Federation of Serbia) Crvena zvezda	(Basketball Federation of Montenegro) Dejan Radonjić	Signed by Panathinaikos	30 June 2022	Pre-season	(Basketball Federation of Serbia) Vladimir Jovanović	8 July 2022
(Spanish Basketball Federation) Real Madrid	(Spanish Basketball Federation) Pablo Laso	Sacked	4 July 2022	Pre-season	(Spanish Basketball Federation) Jesús Mateo	5 July 2022
(Basketball Federation of Serbia) Crvena zvezda	(Basketball Federation of Serbia) Vladimir Jovanović	Mutual agreement	13 November 2022	18th (1–6)	(Basketball Federation of Montenegro) Duško Ivanović	14 November 2022
(Hellenic Basketball Federation) Panathinaikos	(Basketball Federation of Montenegro) Dejan Radonjić	Sacked	21 February 2023	16th (8–16)	(Hellenic Basketball Federation) Christos Serelis	21 February 2023

== Player movements ==
=== Between two EuroLeague teams ===
Date	Player	From	To	Contract years	Ref.
June 22	(Croatia) Ante Žižić	(Israeli Basketball Association) Maccabi Tel Aviv	(Turkish Basketball Federation) Anadolu Efes	2+1	
June 24	(Uganda) Brandon Davies	(Spanish Basketball Federation) Barcelona	(Italian Basketball Federation) Olimpia Milano	2	
June 26	(United States) Darrun Hilliard	(German Basketball Federation) Bayern Munich	(Israeli Basketball Association) Maccabi Tel Aviv	1	
June 26	(Turkey) Scottie Wilbekin	(Israeli Basketball Association) Maccabi Tel Aviv	(Turkish Basketball Federation) Fenerbahçe	3	
June 27	(United States) Austin Hollins	(Basketball Federation of Serbia) Crvena zvezda	(Israeli Basketball Association) Maccabi Tel Aviv	1	
June 27	(Armenia) Chris Jones	(French Federation of Basketball) ASVEL	(Spanish Basketball Federation) Valencia	1	
June 30	(Serbia) Danilo Anđušić	(French Federation of Basketball) AS Monaco	(Basketball Federation of Serbia) Partizan	2	
June 30	(United States) Wade Baldwin	(Spanish Basketball Federation) Baskonia	(Israeli Basketball Association) Maccabi Tel Aviv	2	
June 30	(France) Nando de Colo	(Turkish Basketball Federation) Fenerbahçe	(French Federation of Basketball) ASVEL	2	
July 1	(Cameroon) Paris Lee	(French Federation of Basketball) AS Monaco	(Hellenic Basketball Federation) Panathinaikos	2	
July 1	(United States) Josh Nebo	(Lithuanian Basketball Federation) Žalgiris	(Israeli Basketball Association) Maccabi Tel Aviv	1	
July 1	(Czech Republic) Jan Veselý	(Turkish Basketball Federation) Fenerbahçe	(Spanish Basketball Federation) Barcelona	3	
July 3	(Latvia) Rolands Šmits	(Spanish Basketball Federation) Barcelona	(Lithuanian Basketball Federation) Žalgiris	2	
July 7	(Serbia) Nemanja Nedović	(Hellenic Basketball Federation) Panathinaikos	(Basketball Federation of Serbia) Crvena zvezda	3	
July 9	(United States) Hassan Martin	(Hellenic Basketball Federation) Olympiacos	(Basketball Federation of Serbia) Crvena zvezda	2	
July 10	(Australia) Dante Exum	(Spanish Basketball Federation) Barcelona	(Basketball Federation of Serbia) Partizan	1	
July 10	(Bosnia and Herzegovina) Alec Peters	(Spanish Basketball Federation) Baskonia	(Hellenic Basketball Federation) Olympiacos	1	
July 11	(Germany) Oscar da Silva	(German Basketball Federation) ALBA Berlin	(Spanish Basketball Federation) Barcelona	3	
July 12	(United States) Keenan Evans	(Israeli Basketball Association) Maccabi Tel Aviv	(Lithuanian Basketball Federation) Žalgiris	2	
July 12	(Serbia) Nikola Kalinić	(Basketball Federation of Serbia) Crvena zvezda	(Spanish Basketball Federation) Barcelona	2	
July 13	(United States) James Nunnally	(Israeli Basketball Association) Maccabi Tel Aviv	(Basketball Federation of Serbia) Partizan	1	
July 15	(France) Élie Okobo	(French Federation of Basketball) ASVEL	(French Federation of Basketball) AS Monaco	2	
July 15	(United States) Derrick Williams	(Israeli Basketball Association) Maccabi Tel Aviv	(Hellenic Basketball Federation) Panathinaikos	1	
July 15	(United States) Nate Wolters	(Basketball Federation of Serbia) Crvena zvezda	(Hellenic Basketball Federation) Panathinaikos	1	
July 18	(Spain) Sergio Rodríguez	(Italian Basketball Federation) Olimpia Milano	(Spanish Basketball Federation) Real Madrid	1	
July 19	(Greece) Ioannis Papapetrou	(Hellenic Basketball Federation) Panathinaikos	(Basketball Federation of Serbia) Partizan	1	
July 19	(Serbia) Filip Petrušev	(Turkish Basketball Federation) Anadolu Efes	(Basketball Federation of Serbia) Crvena zvezda	1	
July 20	(Ghana) Ben Bentil	(Italian Basketball Federation) Olimpia Milano	(Basketball Federation of Serbia) Crvena zvezda	1	
July 20	(Italy) Achille Polonara	(Turkish Basketball Federation) Fenerbahçe	(Turkish Basketball Federation) Anadolu Efes	1+1	
July 21	(France) Matthew Strazel	(French Federation of Basketball) ASVEL	(French Federation of Basketball) AS Monaco	3	
July 22	(United States) Nigel Hayes	(Spanish Basketball Federation) Barcelona	(Turkish Basketball Federation) Fenerbahçe	1	
July 22	(France) Adrien Moerman	(Turkish Basketball Federation) Anadolu Efes	(French Federation of Basketball) AS Monaco	1+1	
July 26	(Slovenia) Mike Tobey	(Spanish Basketball Federation) Valencia	(Spanish Basketball Federation) Barcelona	1	
July 26	(New Zealand) Yanni Wetzell	(Spanish Basketball Federation) Baskonia	(German Basketball Federation) ALBA Berlin	3	
July 29	(France) Joffrey Lauvergne	(Lithuanian Basketball Federation) Žalgiris	(French Federation of Basketball) ASVEL	3	
July 29	(United States) Deshaun Thomas	(German Basketball Federation) Bayern Munich	(Italian Basketball Federation) Olimpia Milano	1	
August 23	(Greece) Nick Calathes	(Spanish Basketball Federation) Barcelona	(Turkish Basketball Federation) Fenerbahçe	2	
October 21	(United States) Dwayne Bacon	(French Federation of Basketball) AS Monaco	(Hellenic Basketball Federation) Panathinaikos	2	
October 23	(Senegal) Pierriá Henry	(Turkish Basketball Federation) Fenerbahçe	(Spanish Basketball Federation) Baskonia	1	
January 6	(United States) Isaiah Taylor	(Turkish Basketball Federation) Anadolu Efes	(Lithuanian Basketball Federation) Žalgiris	1	
January 7	(Italy) Achille Polonara	(Turkish Basketball Federation) Anadolu Efes	(Lithuanian Basketball Federation) Žalgiris	1	

=== To a EuroLeague team ===
Date	Player	From	To	Contract years	Ref.
June 7	(United States) Will Clyburn	(Russian Basketball Federation) CSKA Moscow	(Turkish Basketball Federation) Anadolu Efes	2	
June 10	(Lithuania) Laurynas Birutis	(Spanish Basketball Federation) Obradoiro	(Lithuanian Basketball Federation) Žalgiris	2	
June 20	(Turkey) Samet Geyik	(Turkish Basketball Federation) Türk Telekom	(Turkish Basketball Federation) Fenerbahçe	1	
June 20	(United States) Johnathan Motley	(Russian Basketball Federation) Lokomotiv Kuban	(Turkish Basketball Federation) Fenerbahçe	2	
June 21	(Ivory Coast) Alex Poythress	(Russian Basketball Federation) Zenit	(Israeli Basketball Association) Maccabi Tel Aviv	1	
June 22	(United States) Bonzie Colson	(Turkish Basketball Federation) Karşıyaka	(Israeli Basketball Association) Maccabi Tel Aviv	2	
June 23	(Israel) Guy Pnini	(Israeli Basketball Association) Hapoel Holon	(Israeli Basketball Association) Maccabi Tel Aviv	1	
June 25	(Italy) Stefano Tonut	(Italian Basketball Federation) Reyer Venezia	(Italian Basketball Federation) Olimpia Milano	2	
June 27	(Nigeria) Tonye Jekiri	(Russian Basketball Federation) UNICS	(Turkish Basketball Federation) Fenerbahçe	1+1	
June 27	(Canada) Naz Mitrou-Long	(Italian Basketball Federation) Brescia	(Italian Basketball Federation) Olimpia Milano	1	
June 28	(United States) Billy Baron	(Russian Basketball Federation) Zenit	(Italian Basketball Federation) Olimpia Milano	2	
June 28	(Israel) Rafi Menco	(Israeli Basketball Association) Hapoel Holon	(Israeli Basketball Association) Maccabi Tel Aviv	1	
June 29	(Spain) Lorenzo Brown	(Russian Basketball Federation) UNICS	(Israeli Basketball Association) Maccabi Tel Aviv	2	
June 30	(France) Amath M'Baye	(Turkish Basketball Federation) Karşıyaka	(Turkish Basketball Federation) Anadolu Efes	1+1	
July 1	(Turkey) Egehan Arna	(Turkish Basketball Federation) Beşiktaş	(Turkish Basketball Federation) Anadolu Efes	2	
July 1	(Lithuania) Arnas Butkevičius	(Lithuanian Basketball Federation) Rytas	(Lithuanian Basketball Federation) Žalgiris	2	
July 2	(Greece) Panagiotis Kalaitzakis	(Lithuanian Basketball Federation) Lietkabelis	(Hellenic Basketball Federation) Panathinaikos	2	
July 4	(Croatia) Danko Branković	(Croatian Basketball Federation) Cibona	(German Basketball Federation) Bayern Munich		
July 4	(United States) Jarell Martin	(Basketball Australia) Sydney Kings	(Israeli Basketball Association) Maccabi Tel Aviv	1	
July 4	(Czech Republic) Tomáš Satoranský	(USA Basketball) Washington Wizards	(Spanish Basketball Federation) Barcelona	3	
July 6	(Russia) Joel Bolomboy	(Russian Basketball Federation) CSKA Moscow	(Hellenic Basketball Federation) Olympiacos	1	
July 7	(France) Amine Noua	(Andorran Basketball Federation) Andorra	(French Federation of Basketball) ASVEL	2	
July 8	(United States) Isaiah Canaan	(Turkish Basketball Federation) Galatasaray	(Hellenic Basketball Federation) Olympiacos	2	
July 8	(United States) Parker Jackson-Cartwright	(German Basketball Federation) Bonn	(French Federation of Basketball) ASVEL	1	
July 8	(Belgium) Retin Obasohan	(Israeli Basketball Association) Hapoel Jerusalem	(French Federation of Basketball) ASVEL	1	
July 8	(Italy) Gabriele Procida	(Italian Basketball Federation) Fortitudo Bologna	(German Basketball Federation) ALBA Berlin	3	
July 8	(United States) James Webb	(Spanish Basketball Federation) Murcia	(Spanish Basketball Federation) Valencia	1	
July 10	(United States) Daulton Hommes	(USA Basketball) Birmingham Squadron	(Spanish Basketball Federation) Baskonia	2	
July 10	(Germany) Jan Niklas Wimberg	(German Basketball Federation) Chemnitz	(German Basketball Federation) Bayern Munich	2	
July 12	(Germany) Elias Harris	(Japan Basketball Association) San-en NeoPhoenix	(German Basketball Federation) Bayern Munich	2	
July 12	(Puerto Rico) John Holland	(Turkish Basketball Federation) Bursaspor	(Basketball Federation of Serbia) Crvena zvezda	1	
July 12	(United States) Jonah Mathews	(Polish Basketball Federation) Anwil Włocławek	(French Federation of Basketball) ASVEL	1	
July 13	(Belgium) Ismaël Bako	(Spanish Basketball Federation) Manresa	(Italian Basketball Federation) Virtus Bologna	1	
July 13	(United States) Jordan Mickey	(Russian Basketball Federation) Zenit	(Italian Basketball Federation) Virtus Bologna	1	
July 13	(Switzerland) Anthony Polite	(USA Basketball) Florida State	(French Federation of Basketball) ASVEL	2	
July 14	(Serbia) Dalibor Ilić	(Basketball Federation of Bosnia and Herzegovina) Igokea	(Basketball Federation of Serbia) Crvena zvezda	4	
July 14	(Lithuania) Marius Grigonis	(Russian Basketball Federation) CSKA Moscow	(Hellenic Basketball Federation) Panathinaikos	1+1	
July 14	(Bosnia and Herzegovina) Džanan Musa	(Spanish Basketball Federation) Breogán	(Spanish Basketball Federation) Real Madrid	2	
July 16	(United States) Andrew Andrews	(Turkish Basketball Federation) Bursaspor	(Hellenic Basketball Federation) Panathinaikos	2	
July 16	(United States) Jordan Loyd	(Russian Basketball Federation) Zenit	(French Federation of Basketball) AS Monaco	2	
July 17	(United States) John Brown	(Italian Basketball Federation) Brescia	(French Federation of Basketball) AS Monaco	2	
July 17	(United States) Markus Howard	(USA Basketball) Denver Nuggets	(Spanish Basketball Federation) Baskonia	2	
July 18	(Montenegro) Jonah Radebaugh	(German Basketball Federation) Ludwigsburg	(Spanish Basketball Federation) Valencia	2	
July 19	(United States) Jaron Blossomgame	(German Basketball Federation) Ratiopharm Ulm	(French Federation of Basketball) AS Monaco	1+1	
July 20	(Lithuania) Artūras Gudaitis	(Russian Basketball Federation) Zenit	(Hellenic Basketball Federation) Panathinaikos	1	
July 21	(Croatia) Mario Hezonja	(Russian Basketball Federation) UNICS	(Spanish Basketball Federation) Real Madrid	2	
July 21	(Denmark) Gabriel Lundberg	(USA Basketball) Phoenix Suns	(Italian Basketball Federation) Virtus Bologna	1	
July 22	(Canada) Kyle Alexander	(Spanish Basketball Federation) Fuenlabrada	(Spanish Basketball Federation) Valencia	2	
July 22	(Slovenia) Žiga Samar	(Spanish Basketball Federation) Fuenlabrada	(German Basketball Federation) ALBA Berlin	4	
July 23	(France) Yoan Makoundou	(French Federation of Basketball) Cholet	(French Federation of Basketball) AS Monaco	4	
July 24	(Lithuania) Ignas Brazdeikis	(USA Basketball) Orlando Magic	(Lithuanian Basketball Federation) Žalgiris	1+1	
July 25	(United States) Freddie Gillespie	(USA Basketball) Memphis Hustle	(German Basketball Federation) Bayern Munich	2	
July 25	(Greece) Georgios Kalaitzakis	(USA Basketball) Oklahoma City Thunder	(Hellenic Basketball Federation) Panathinaikos	2	
July 25	(Estonia) Maik Kotsar	(German Basketball Federation) Hamburg Towers	(Spanish Basketball Federation) Baskonia	2	
July 26	(France) Yves Pons	(USA Basketball) Memphis Grizzlies	(French Federation of Basketball) ASVEL	2	
July 27	(France) Petr Cornelie	(USA Basketball) Grand Rapids Gold	(Spanish Basketball Federation) Real Madrid	1	
July 27	(Canada) Kevin Pangos	(Russian Basketball Federation) CSKA Moscow	(Italian Basketball Federation) Olimpia Milano	2	
July 28	(United States) Semi Ojeleye	(USA Basketball) Boston Celtics	(Italian Basketball Federation) Virtus Bologna	2	
July 28	(United States) Cassius Winston	(USA Basketball) Washington Wizards	(German Basketball Federation) Bayern Munich	1	
July 29	(United States) Jaylen Adams	(Basketball Australia) Sydney Kings	(Basketball Federation of Serbia) Crvena zvezda	1	
July 29	(Central African Republic) Kevarrius Hayes	(Turkish Basketball Federation) Bursaspor	(Lithuanian Basketball Federation) Žalgiris	1+1	
July 31	(United States) Tarik Black	(Turkish Basketball Federation) Bahçeşehir Koleji	(Hellenic Basketball Federation) Olympiacos	1	
July 31	(United States) Carsen Edwards	(USA Basketball) Detroit Pistons	(Turkish Basketball Federation) Fenerbahçe	1	
August 1	(Spain) Oriol Paulí	(Andorran Basketball Federation) Andorra	(Spanish Basketball Federation) Barcelona	2	
August 2	(Croatia) Leo Menalo	(Italian Basketball Federation) Stella Azzurra	(Italian Basketball Federation) Virtus Bologna	4	
August 3	(Spain) Dani Díez	(Spanish Basketball Federation) San Pablo Burgos	(Spanish Basketball Federation) Baskonia	1	
August 6	(Lithuania) Dovydas Giedraitis	(Lithuanian Basketball Federation) Lietkabelis	(Lithuanian Basketball Federation) Žalgiris	3+2	
August 8	(Serbia) Nemanja Bjelica	(USA Basketball) Golden State Warriors	(Turkish Basketball Federation) Fenerbahçe	2	
August 12	(United States) Darius Thompson	(Russian Basketball Federation) Lokomotiv Kuban	(Spanish Basketball Federation) Baskonia	2	
August 14	(Greece) George Papas	(USA Basketball) Monmouth University	(Hellenic Basketball Federation) Olympiacos	2	
August 19	(Germany) Isaac Bonga	(Canada Basketball) Toronto Raptors	(German Basketball Federation) Bayern Munich	2	
September 2	(Germany) Johannes Voigtmann	(Russian Basketball Federation) CSKA Moscow	(Italian Basketball Federation) Olimpia Milano	2	
September 7	(United States) Jared Harper	(USA Basketball) Birmingham Squadron	(Spanish Basketball Federation) Valencia	1	
September 23	(Poland) Mateusz Ponitka	(Russian Basketball Federation) Zenit	(Hellenic Basketball Federation) Panathinaikos	1	
September 28	(Serbia) Miroslav Raduljica	(Korea Basketball Association) Goyang Orions	(Basketball Federation of Serbia) Crvena zvezda	2	
October 13	(Argentina) Luca Vildoza	(USA Basketball) Milwaukee Bucks	(Basketball Federation of Serbia) Crvena zvezda	2	
October 15	(United States) Jalen Adams	(Israeli Basketball Association) Hapoel Jerusalem	(Israeli Basketball Association) Maccabi Tel Aviv	3 months	
October 27	(Israel) Alex Tyus	(Turkish Basketball Federation) Karşıyaka	(French Federation of Basketball) ASVEL	1	
November 1	(United States) Isaiah Taylor	(Spanish Basketball Federation) Murcia	(Turkish Basketball Federation) Anadolu Efes	1	
November 8	(Germany) Niels Giffey	(Spanish Basketball Federation) Murcia	(German Basketball Federation) Bayern Munich	3	
November 11	(Slovakia) Vladimír Brodziansky	(Turkish Basketball Federation) Bahçeşehir Koleji	(Basketball Federation of Serbia) Partizan	1	
November 19	(France) Timothé Luwawu-Cabarrot	(USA Basketball) Atlanta Hawks	(Italian Basketball Federation) Olimpia Milano	1	
December 19	(Greece) Kostas Antetokounmpo	(USA Basketball) Chicago Bulls	(Turkish Basketball Federation) Fenerbahçe	1	
December 19	(Argentina) Facundo Campazzo	(USA Basketball) Dallas Mavericks	(Basketball Federation of Serbia) Crvena zvezda	2	
January 16	(Bulgaria) Dee Bost	(Turkish Basketball Federation) Galatasaray	(French Federation of Basketball) ASVEL	1	
January 16	(Nigeria) Chima Moneke	(USA Basketball) Sacramento Kings	(French Federation of Basketball) AS Monaco	2	
January 18	(United States) Shannon Evans	(Spanish Basketball Federation) Real Betis	(Spanish Basketball Federation) Valencia	2	
January 20	(Nigeria) Suleiman Braimoh	(Turkish Basketball Federation) Tofaş	(Israeli Basketball Association) Maccabi Tel Aviv	1	
January 28	(United States) Max Heidegger	(Turkish Basketball Federation) Merkezefendi	(Spanish Basketball Federation) Baskonia	2	
January 28	(Puerto Rico) Shabazz Napier	(Asociación Deportiva Mexicana de Básquetbol) Capitanes de la Ciudad de México	(Italian Basketball Federation) Olimpia Milano	1	
January 31	(Greece) Dimitris Agravanis	(Hellenic Basketball Federation) Peristeri	(Hellenic Basketball Federation) Panathinaikos	3	
January 31	(United States) Matt Thomas	(USA Basketball) Chicago Bulls	(Hellenic Basketball Federation) Panathinaikos	2	
March 1	(Greece) Tyler Dorsey	(USA Basketball) Texas Legends	(Turkish Basketball Federation) Fenerbahçe	3	

=== Leaving a EuroLeague team ===
Date	Player	From	To	Ref.
June 17	(Turkey) Yiğitcan Saybir	(Turkish Basketball Federation) Anadolu Efes	(Turkish Basketball Federation) Bursaspor	
June 19	(United States) Markel Starks	(Turkish Basketball Federation) Fenerbahçe	(Turkish Basketball Federation) Darüşşafaka	
June 21	(Jordan) Ahmet Düverioğlu	(Turkish Basketball Federation) Fenerbahçe	(Turkish Basketball Federation) Bursaspor	
June 22	(Bosnia and Herzegovina) Nihad Đedović	(German Basketball Federation) Bayern Munich	(Spanish Basketball Federation) Unicaja Málaga	
June 24	(United States) Jehyve Floyd	(Turkish Basketball Federation) Fenerbahçe	(Turkish Basketball Federation) Galatasaray	
June 25	(United States) James Anderson	(Turkish Basketball Federation) Anadolu Efes	(Spanish Basketball Federation) Murcia	
June 25	(United States) Rob Gray	(French Federation of Basketball) AS Monaco	(Turkish Basketball Federation) Tofaş	
June 26	(Israel) Oz Blayzer	(Israeli Basketball Association) Maccabi Tel Aviv	(Israeli Basketball Association) Hapoel Jerusalem	
June 26	(Serbia) Dejan Davidovac	(Basketball Federation of Serbia) Crvena zvezda	(Russian Basketball Federation) CSKA Moscow	
June 28	(United States) Raymar Morgan	(French Federation of Basketball) ASVEL	(Turkish Basketball Federation) Galatasaray	
June 28	(Greece) Leonidas Kaselakis	(Hellenic Basketball Federation) Panathinaikos	(Hellenic Basketball Federation) Peristeri	
July 2	(Italy) Riccardo Moraschini	(Italian Basketball Federation) Olimpia Milano	(Italian Basketball Federation) Reyer Venezia	
July 2	(Germany) Dylan Osetkowski	(French Federation of Basketball) ASVEL	(Spanish Basketball Federation) Unicaja Málaga	
July 4	(Uruguay) Jayson Granger	(Spanish Basketball Federation) Baskonia	(Italian Basketball Federation) Reyer Venezia	
July 4	(France) Victor Wembanyama	(French Federation of Basketball) ASVEL	(French Federation of Basketball) Metropolitans 92	
July 6	(Bosnia and Herzegovina) Amar Alibegović	(Italian Basketball Federation) Virtus Bologna	(Basketball Federation of Slovenia) Cedevita Olimpija	
July 7	(Italy) Amedeo Tessitori	(Italian Basketball Federation) Virtus Bologna	(Italian Basketball Federation) Reyer Venezia	
July 9	(United States) Daryl Macon	(Hellenic Basketball Federation) Panathinaikos	(Russian Basketball Federation) UNICS	
July 10	(France) Jerry Boutsiele	(French Federation of Basketball) AS Monaco	(Turkish Basketball Federation) Bahçeşehir Koleji	
July 10	(Lithuania) Regimantas Miniotas	(Lithuanian Basketball Federation) Žalgiris	(Lithuanian Basketball Federation) Wolves	
July 12	(United States) Kaleb Tarczewski	(Italian Basketball Federation) Olimpia Milano	(Japan Basketball Association) Gunma Crane Thunders	
July 13	(United States) Trey Thompkins	(Spanish Basketball Federation) Real Madrid	(Russian Basketball Federation) Zenit	
July 14	(United States) Jerian Grant	(Italian Basketball Federation) Olimpia Milano	(Turkish Basketball Federation) Türk Telekom	
July 15	(Italy) Angelo Caloiaro	(Israeli Basketball Association) Maccabi Tel Aviv	(Turkish Basketball Federation) Galatasaray	
July 15	(Syria) Trey Kell	(Italian Basketball Federation) Olimpia Milano	(Basketball Australia) South East Melbourne Phoenix	
July 15	(Australia) Brock Motum	(French Federation of Basketball) AS Monaco	(Japan Basketball Association) Levanga Hokkaido	
July 15	(United States) Jalen Reynolds	(Israeli Basketball Association) Maccabi Tel Aviv	(Russian Basketball Federation) UNICS	
July 15	(United States) Khyri Thomas	(Israeli Basketball Association) Maccabi Tel Aviv	(Turkish Basketball Federation) Tofas	
July 15	(Georgia (country)) Will Thomas	(French Federation of Basketball) AS Monaco	(Spanish Basketball Federation) Unicaja Málaga	
July 18	(France) Livio Jean-Charles	(Hellenic Basketball Federation) Olympiacos	(Russian Basketball Federation) CSKA Moscow	
July 19	(Germany) Joshua Obiese	(German Basketball Federation) Bayern Munich	(German Basketball Federation) Skyliners Frankfurt	
July 21	(France) William Howard	(French Federation of Basketball) ASVEL	(Spanish Basketball Federation) Joventut Badalona	
July 24	(Greece) Tyler Dorsey	(Hellenic Basketball Federation) Olympiacos	(USA Basketball) Dallas Mavericks	
July 24	(Senegal) Ibrahima Fall Faye	(French Federation of Basketball) AS Monaco	(French Federation of Basketball) Metropolitans 92	
July 27	(Italy) Simone Fontecchio	(Spanish Basketball Federation) Baskonia	(USA Basketball) Utah Jazz	
July 27	(France) Louis Labeyrie	(Spanish Basketball Federation) Valencia	(Russian Basketball Federation) UNICS	
August 1	(Germany) Gavin Schilling	(German Basketball Federation) Bayern Munich	(French Federation of Basketball) Limoges	
August 1	(New Zealand) Tai Webster	(Lithuanian Basketball Federation) Žalgiris	(Turkish Basketball Federation) Petkim	
August 3	(North Macedonia) Nenad Dimitrijević	(Spanish Basketball Federation) Valencia	(Russian Basketball Federation) UNICS	
August 5	(France) Léo Westermann	(French Federation of Basketball) AS Monaco	(Spanish Basketball Federation) Obradoiro	

== See also ==
- List of 2022–23 NBA season transactions
