= EuroLeague career statistical leaders =

The EuroLeague is the highest level tier and most important professional club competition between basketball teams in Europe. It can contain teams from up to 18 countries, from members of FIBA Europe, and mostly consisting of teams from ULEB member national domestic leagues.

The FIBA era statistical leaders of the competition range from 1958 to 2000, including the lone season of the FIBA SuproLeague competition. While the EuroLeague Commercial Assets (ECA) era statistical leaders of the competition range from 2000 to the present. There are also the overall historical statistical leaders of the EuroLeague, which are the stat leaders for all formats and organizing bodies of the league's history, since 1958.

== EuroLeague career statistical leaders 2000–01 to present ==
The EuroLeague's career statistical leaders, since the competition has been organized by the EuroLeague Commercial Assets (ECA), starting with the 2000–01 season.

Active EuroLeague player
Active, but not on a EuroLeague team
Retired, and has been selected to at least one All-EuroLeague Team

Note: Flags indicate national team eligibility at FIBA-sanctioned events. Players may hold other non-FIBA nationalities not displayed.

Bold indicates current club.

=== Games played ===
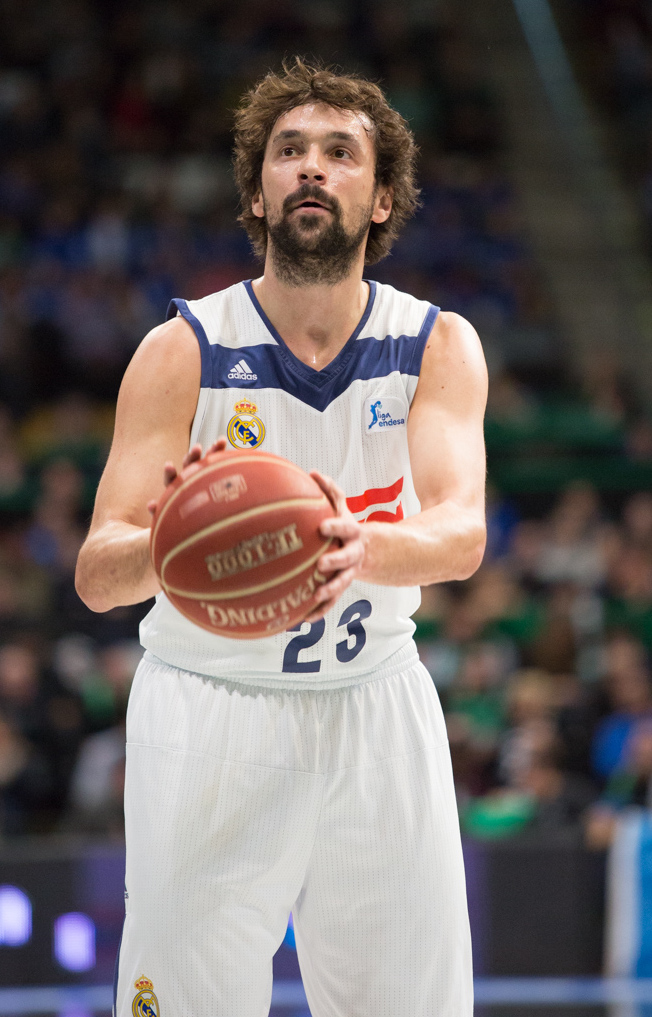
Sergio Llull has played the most games and has made the most three pointers in Euroleague history.

Rank	Player	Club(s)	Games Played
1	(Spain) Sergio Llull	**Real Madrid**	490
2	(Greece) Kostas Sloukas	Olympiacos, Fenerbahçe, **Panathinaikos**	469
3	(Greece) Kostas Papanikolaou	**Olympiacos**, Barcelona	444
4	(United States) Kyle Hines	Brose Bamberg, Olympiacos, CSKA Moscow, Olimpia Milano	425
5	(Czech Republic) Jan Veselý	Partizan, Fenerbahçe, Barcelona	414
6	(Spain) Sergio Rodríguez	Estudiantes, Real Madrid, CSKA Moscow, Olimpia Milano	405
7	(Greece) (United States) Nick Calathes	Panathinaikos, Barcelona, Fenerbahçe, Monaco, Partizan	402
8	(Lithuania) Edgaras Ulanovas	**Žalgiris**, Fenerbahçe	395
9	(Lithuania) Paulius Jankūnas	Žalgiris, Khimki	392
10	(Italy) Nicolò Melli	Olimpia Milano, Brose Bamberg, **Fenerbahçe**	388
11	(United States) (Armenia) Bryant Dunston	**Olympiacos**, Anadolu Efes, Virtus Bologna, Žalgiris, Olimpia Milano	384
12	(Italy) (United States) Daniel Hackett	Olimpia Milano, Olympiacos, Brose Bamberg, CSKA Moscow, **Virtus Bologna**	383
13	(Serbia) Nikola Kalinić	Crvena zvezda, Fenerbahçe, Valencia, Barcelona	383
14	(Greece) Georgios Printezis	Olympiacos, Unicaja Málaga	375
15	(United States) Mike James	Baskonia, Panathinaikos, Olimpia Milano, CSKA Moscow, Monaco, **Anadolu Efes**	365
16	(Greece) Vassilis Spanoulis	Panathinaikos, Olympiacos	358
17	(France) Fabien Causeur	Cholet, Baskonia, Brose Bamberg, Real Madrid, Olimpia Milano	357
17	(France) Nando de Colo	Valencia, CSKA Moscow, Fenerbahçe, ASVEL	357
17	(Spain) Felipe Reyes	Estudiantes, Real Madrid	357
20	(Spain) Rudy Fernández	Joventut Badalona, Real Madrid	349

Last updated: November 20, 2026

=== Minutes played ===
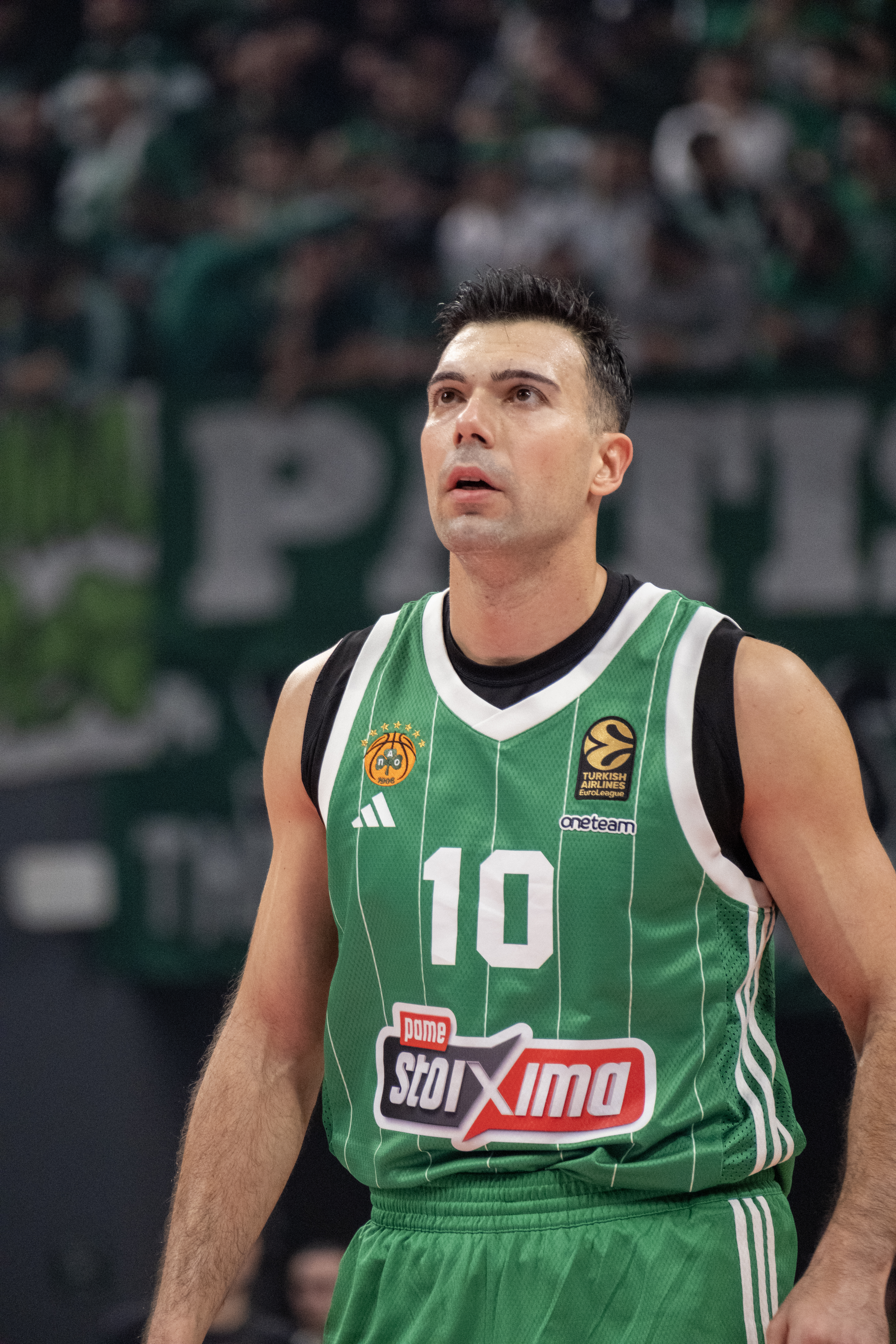
Kostas Sloukas has played the most minutes in Euroleague history.

Rank	Player	Club(s)	Total	Per game
1	(Greece) Kostas Sloukas	Olympiacos, Fenerbahçe, **Panathinaikos**	10,688	22.8
2	(United States) Mike James	Baskonia, Panathinaikos, Olimpia Milano, CSKA Moscow, Monaco, **Anadolu Efes**	10,488	28.7
3	(Spain) Sergio Llull	**Real Madrid**	10,261	20.9
4	(Greece) (United States) Nick Calathes	Panathinaikos, Barcelona, Fenerbahçe, Monaco, Partizan	10,075	25.1
5	(Czech Republic) Jan Veselý	Partizan, Fenerbahçe, Barcelona	9,929	24.0
6	(Greece) Kostas Papanikolaou	**Olympiacos**, Barcelona	9,630	21.7
7	(Lithuania) Edgaras Ulanovas	**Žalgiris**, Fenerbahçe	9,504	24.1
8	(Greece) Vassilis Spanoulis	Panathinaikos, Olympiacos	9,379	26.2
9	(Serbia) Nikola Kalinić	Crvena zvezda, Fenerbahçe, Valencia, Barcelona	9,320	24.3
10	(Italy) Nicolò Melli	Olimpia Milano, Brose Bamberg, **Fenerbahçe**	9,000	23.2
11	(United States) Kyle Hines	Brose Bamberg, Olympiacos, CSKA Moscow, Olimpia Milano	8,789	20.7
12	(France) Nando de Colo	Valencia, CSKA Moscow, Fenerbahçe, ASVEL	8,649	24.2
13	(Lithuania) Paulius Jankūnas	Žalgiris, Khimki	8,390	21.4
14	(Spain) Sergio Rodríguez	Estudiantes, Real Madrid, CSKA Moscow, Olimpia Milano	8,303	20.5
15	(Spain) Juan Carlos Navarro	Barcelona	8,197	24.0
16	(United States) (Armenia) Bryant Dunston	**Olympiacos**, Anadolu Efes, Virtus Bologna, Žalgiris, Olimpia Milano	8,086	21.1
17	(Georgia (country)) Tornike Shengelia	Spirou Charleroi, Baskonia, CSKA Moscow, Virtus Bologna, Barcelona, **Dubai**	8,075	24.5
18	(Italy) (United States) Daniel Hackett	Olimpia Milano, Olympiacos, Brose Bamberg, CSKA Moscow, **Virtus Bologna**	8,074	21.1
19	(Greece) Dimitris Diamantidis	Panathinaikos	7,967	28.7
20	(United States) Will Clyburn	Darüşşafaka, CSKA Moscow, Anadolu Efes, Virtus Bologna, Barcelona, **Fenerbahçe**	7,927	27.4

Last updated: November 20, 2026

=== Performance Index Rating (PIR) ===
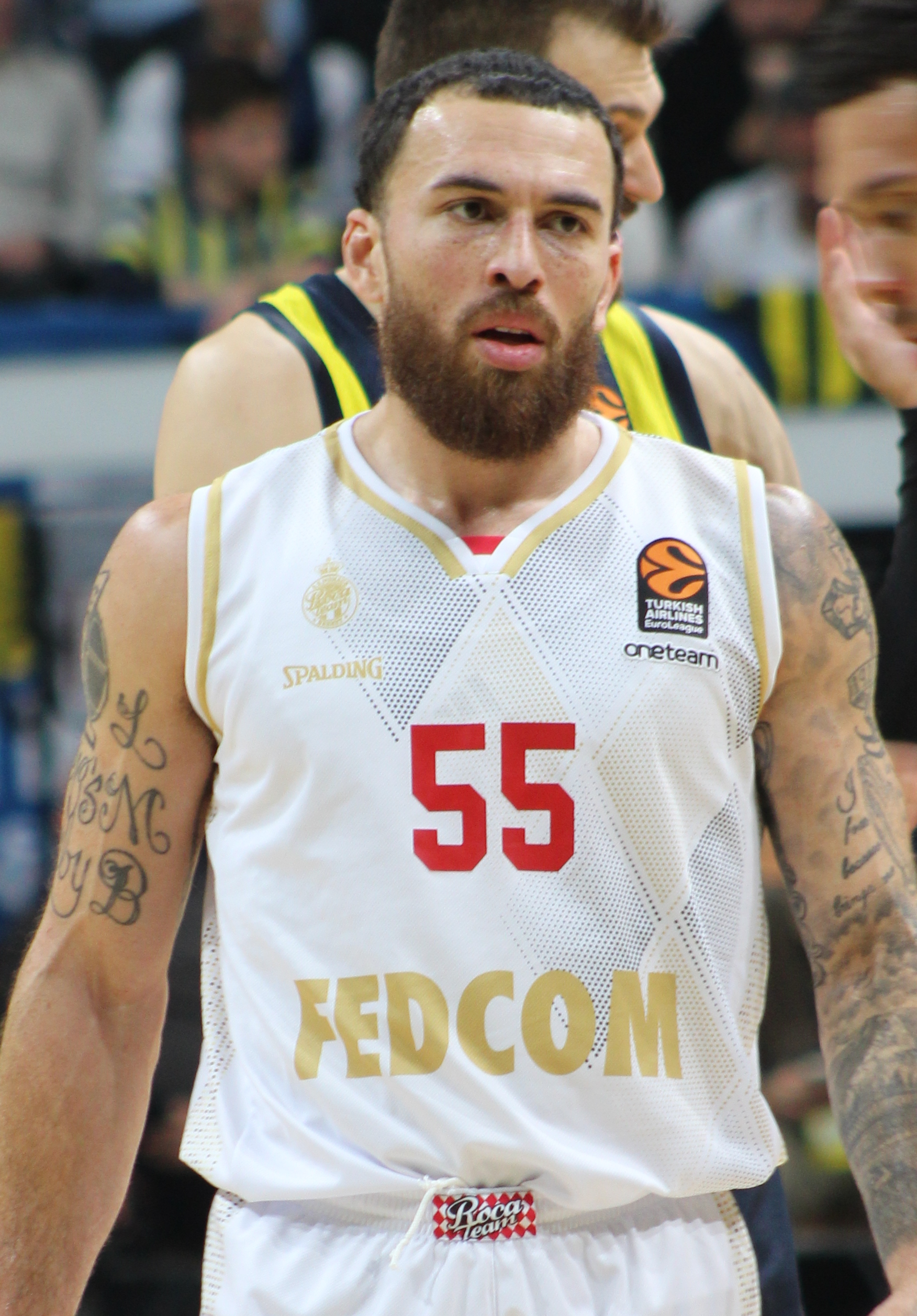
Mike James has the most PIR and most points scored in EuroLeague history.

Rank	Player	Club(s)	Total	Per game
1	(United States) Mike James	Baskonia, Panathinaikos, Olimpia Milano, CSKA Moscow, Monaco, **Anadolu Efes**	6,223	17.05
2	(France) Nando de Colo	Valencia, CSKA Moscow, Fenerbahçe, ASVEL	5,873	16.45
3	(Greece) Kostas Sloukas	Olympiacos, Fenerbahçe, **Panathinaikos**	5,574	11.88
4	(Czech Republic) Jan Veselý	Partizan, Fenerbahçe, Barcelona	5,481	13.24
5	(Spain) (Montenegro) Nikola Mirotić	Real Madrid, Barcelona, Olimpia Milano, Monaco, **Valencia**	5,364	16.97
6	(Cape Verde) Edy Tavares	**Real Madrid**	5,082	15.49
7	(Bulgaria) (Cyprus) Aleksandar Vezenkov	Barcelona, **Olympiacos**	4,798	15.09
8	(Georgia (country)) Tornike Shengelia	Spirou Charleroi, Baskonia, CSKA Moscow, Virtus Bologna, Barcelona, **Dubai**	4,653	14.14
9	(United States) (Turkey) Shane Larkin	Baskonia, Anadolu Efes, **Fenerbahçe**	4,567	17.04
10	(Greece) (United States) Nick Calathes	Panathinaikos, Barcelona, Fenerbahçe, Monaco, Partizan	4,482	11.15
11	(United States) Kyle Hines	Brose Bamberg, Olympiacos, CSKA Moscow, Olimpia Milano	4,299	10.12
12	(United States) Will Clyburn	Darüşşafaka, CSKA Moscow, Anadolu Efes, Virtus Bologna, Barcelona, **Fenerbahçe**	4,298	14.87
13	(Greece) Vassilis Spanoulis	Panathinaikos, Olympiacos	4,183	11.68
14	(Spain) Sergio Rodríguez	Estudiantes, Real Madrid, CSKA Moscow, Olimpia Milano	4,095	11.68
15	(Lithuania) Paulius Jankūnas	Žalgiris, Khimki	4,067	10.38
16	(Serbia) Nikola Milutinov	Partizan, **Olympiacos**, CSKA Moscow	4,048	13.36
17	(United States) (Armenia) Bryant Dunston	**Olympiacos**, Anadolu Efes, Virtus Bologna, Žalgiris, Olimpia Milano	4,040	10.52
18	(Spain) Sergio Llull	**Real Madrid**	3,976	8.11
19	(Spain) Juan Carlos Navarro	Barcelona	3,890	11.41
20	(Italy) Nicolò Melli	Olimpia Milano, Brose Bamberg, **Fenerbahçe**	3,857	9.94

Last updated: November 20, 2026

=== Points scored ===
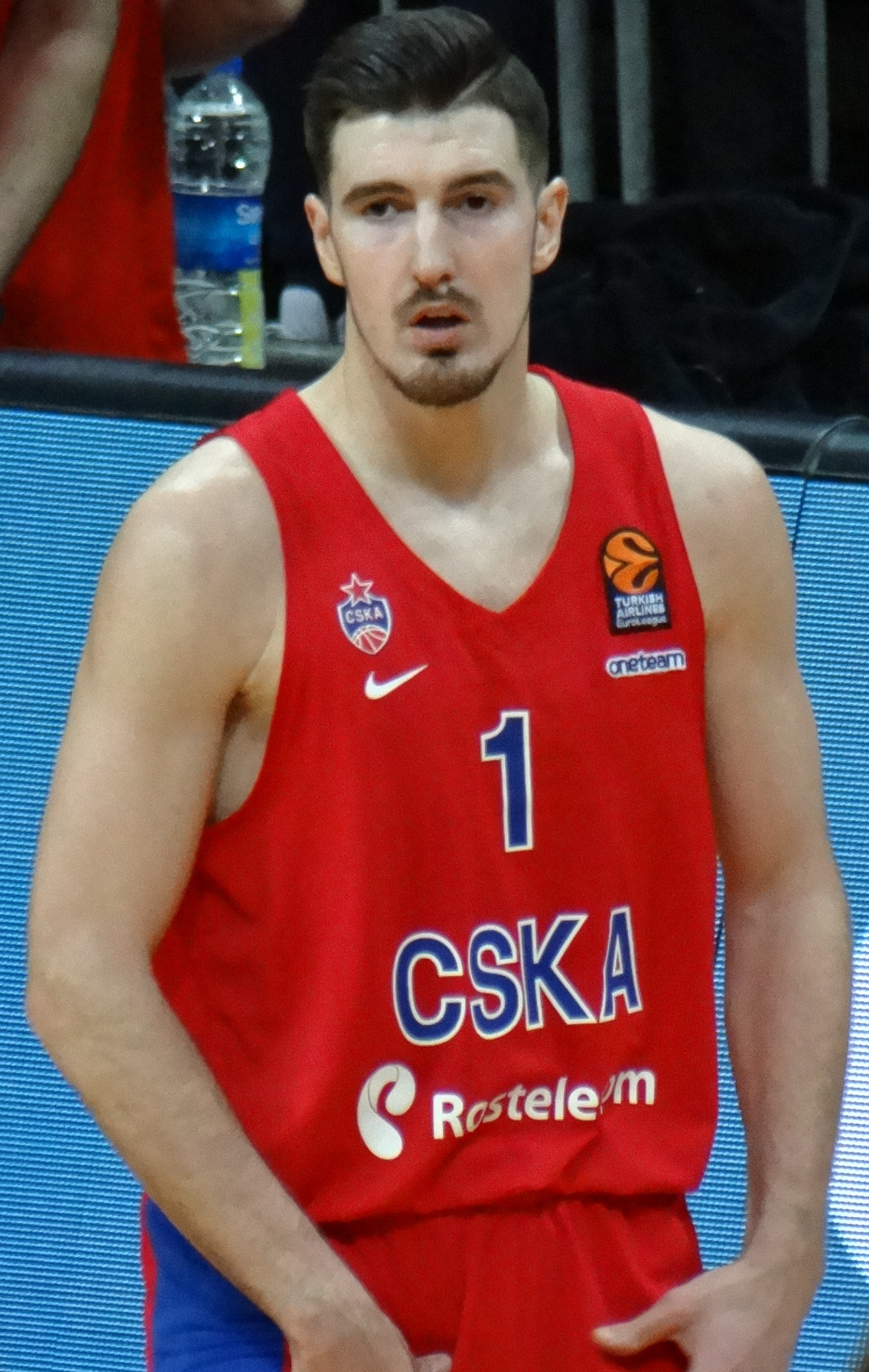
Nando de Colo has the 2nd most PIR and points scored in Euroleague history.

Rank	Player	Club(s)	Total	Per game
1	(United States) Mike James	Baskonia, Panathinaikos, Olimpia Milano, CSKA Moscow, Monaco, **Anadolu Efes**	5,961	16.33
2	(France) Nando de Colo	Valencia, CSKA Moscow, Fenerbahçe, ASVEL	5,193	14.55
3	(Spain) (Montenegro) Nikola Mirotić	Real Madrid, Barcelona, Olimpia Milano, Monaco, **Valencia**	4,525	14.32
4	(Greece) Vassilis Spanoulis	Panathinaikos, Olympiacos	4,455	12.44
5	(Greece) Kostas Sloukas	Olympiacos, Fenerbahçe, **Panathinaikos**	4,447	9.48
6	(Czech Republic) Jan Veselý	Partizan, Fenerbahçe, Barcelona	4,379	10.58
7	(Spain) Sergio Llull	**Real Madrid**	4,358	8.89
8	(Spain) Juan Carlos Navarro	Barcelona	4,152	12.18
9	(Georgia (country)) Tornike Shengelia	Spirou Charleroi, Baskonia, CSKA Moscow, Virtus Bologna, Barcelona, **Dubai**	4,007	12.18
10	(Bulgaria) (Cyprus) Aleksandar Vezenkov	Barcelona, **Olympiacos**	3,953	12.43
11	(United States) Will Clyburn	Darüşşafaka, CSKA Moscow, Anadolu Efes, Virtus Bologna, Barcelona, **Fenerbahçe**	3,922	13.57
12	(United States) (Turkey) Shane Larkin	Baskonia, Anadolu Efes, **Fenerbahçe**	3,905	14.57
13	(Spain) Sergio Rodríguez	Estudiantes, Real Madrid, CSKA Moscow, Olimpia Milano	3,772	9.31
14	(Serbia) Vasilije Micić	Bayern Munich, Crvena zvezda, Žalgiris, Anadolu Efes, **Hapoel Tel Aviv**	3,632	12.93
15	(Greece) Georgios Printezis	Olympiacos, Unicaja Málaga	3,599	9.60
16	(Serbia) Miloš Teodosić	Olympiacos, CSKA Moscow, Virtus Bologna, Crvena zvezda	3,420	11.07
17	(Greece) (United States) Nick Calathes	Panathinaikos, Barcelona, Fenerbahçe, Monaco, Partizan	3,418	8.50
18	(United States) (Turkey) Scottie Wilbekin	Darüşşafaka, Maccabi Tel Aviv, Fenerbahçe, **Beşiktaş**	3,403	13.04
19	(United States) Kyle Hines	Brose Bamberg, Olympiacos, CSKA Moscow, Olimpia Milano	3,339	7.86
20	(United States) Wade Baldwin IV	Olympiacos, Bayern Munich, Baskonia, Maccabi Tel Aviv, **Fenerbahçe**	3,300	13.81

Last updated: November 20, 2026

=== Total rebounds ===
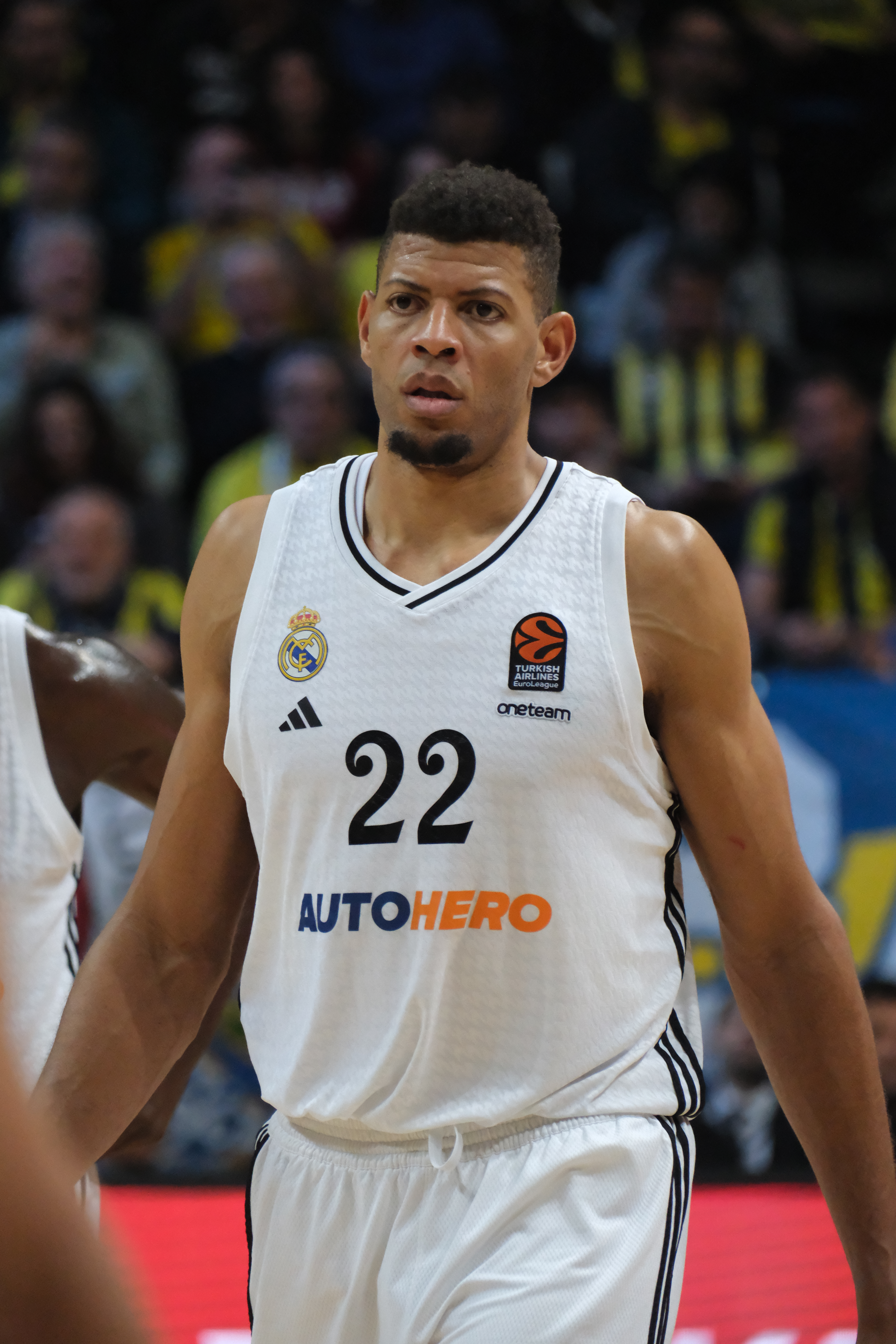
Edy Tavares has the most rebounds and blocks in Euroleague history.

Rank	Player	Club(s)	Total	Per game
1	(Cape Verde) Edy Tavares	**Real Madrid**	2,223	6.78
2	(Lithuania) Paulius Jankūnas	Žalgiris, Khimki	2,010	5.13
3	(Czech Republic) Jan Veselý	Partizan, Fenerbahçe, Barcelona	1,906	4.60
4	(Italy) Nicolò Melli	Olimpia Milano, Brose Bamberg, **Fenerbahçe**	1,887	4.86
5	(United States) Kyle Hines	Brose Bamberg, Olympiacos, CSKA Moscow, Olimpia Milano	1,855	4.36
6	(Spain) Felipe Reyes	Estudiantes, Real Madrid	1,799	5.04
7	(Serbia) Nikola Milutinov	Partizan, **Olympiacos**, CSKA Moscow	1,754	5.79
8	(United States) (Armenia) Bryant Dunston	**Olympiacos**, Anadolu Efes, Virtus Bologna, Žalgiris, Olimpia Milano	1,635	4.26
9	(Spain) (Montenegro) Nikola Mirotić	Real Madrid, Barcelona, Olimpia Milano, Monaco, **Valencia**	1,621	5.13
10	(Greece) Ioannis Bourousis	AEK, Olympiacos, Olimpia Milano, Real Madrid, Baskonia, Panathinaikos	1,603	5.64
11	(Georgia (country)) Tornike Shengelia	Spirou Charleroi, Baskonia, CSKA Moscow, Virtus Bologna, Barcelona, **Dubai**	1,548	4.71
12	(Croatia) Ante Tomić	Real Madrid, Barcelona	1,545	5.46
13	(Germany) Johannes Voigtmann	Baskonia, CSKA Moscow, Olimpia Milano, **Bayern Munich**	1,539	4.81
14	(Greece) Kostas Papanikolaou	**Olympiacos**, Barcelona	1,525	3.43
15	(Bulgaria) (Cyprus) Aleksandar Vezenkov	Barcelona, **Olympiacos**	1,517	4.77
16	(United States) Will Clyburn	Darüşşafaka, CSKA Moscow, Anadolu Efes, Virtus Bologna, Barcelona, **Fenerbahçe**	1,454	5.03
17	(Greece) Georgios Printezis	Olympiacos, Unicaja Málaga	1,452	3.87
18	(Greece) (United States) Nick Calathes	Panathinaikos, Barcelona, Fenerbahçe, Monaco, Partizan	1,437	3.57
19	(United States) (Liberia) Othello Hunter	Montepaschi Siena, Olympiacos, Real Madrid, CSKA Moscow, Maccabi Tel Aviv, Bayern Munich	1,424	5.18
20	(Germany) Tibor Pleiß	Brose Bamberg, Baskonia, Barcelona, Galatasaray, Valencia, Anadolu Efes, Panathinaikos	1,401	4.07

Last updated: November 20, 2026

=== Assists ===
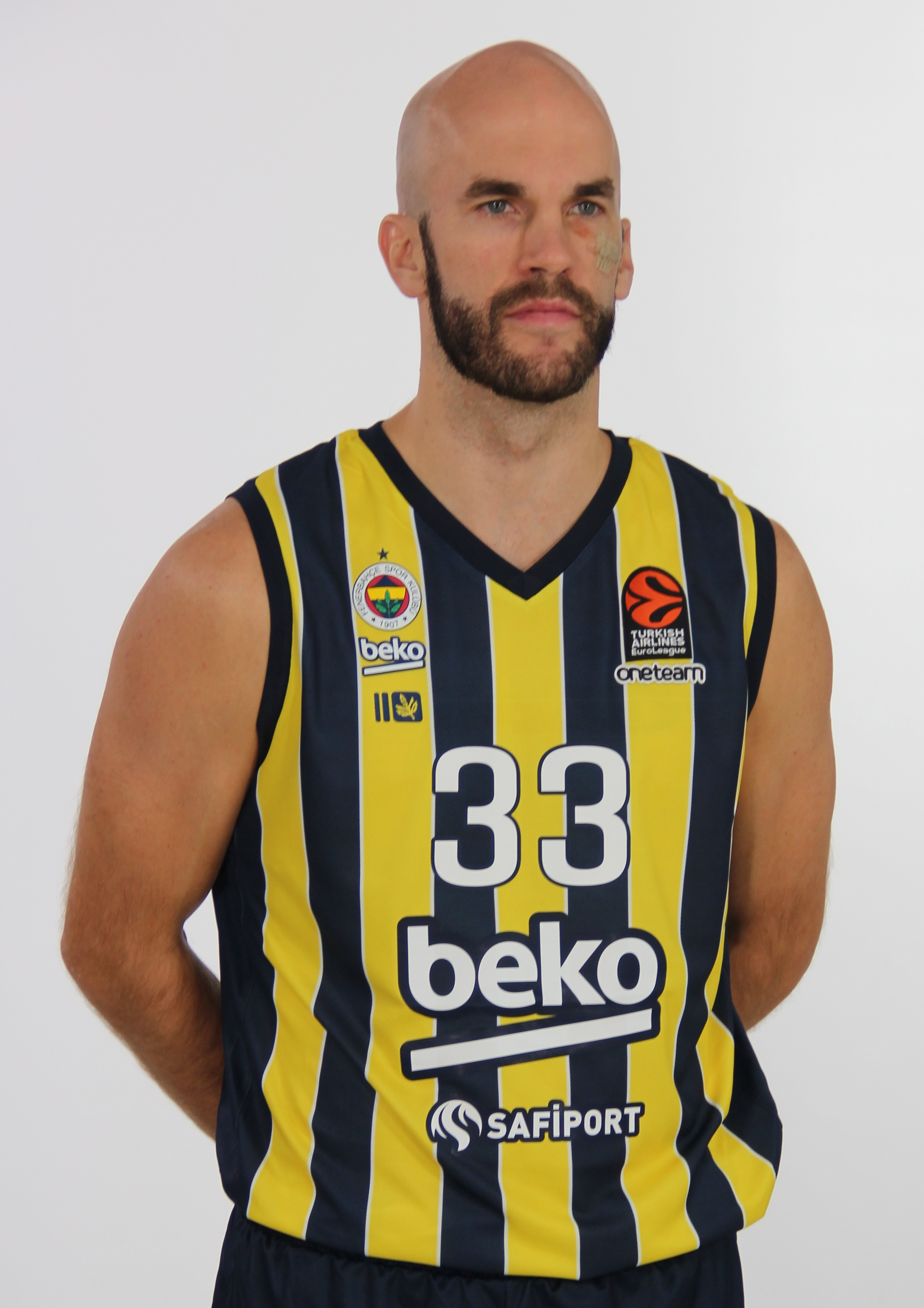
Nick Calathes has the most assists and steals in Euroleague history.

Rank	Player	Club(s)	Total	Per game
1	(Greece) (United States) Nick Calathes	Panathinaikos, Barcelona, Fenerbahçe, Monaco, Partizan	2,266	5.64
2	(Greece) Kostas Sloukas	Olympiacos, Fenerbahçe, **Panathinaikos**	2,096	4.47
3	(Spain) Sergio Rodríguez	Estudiantes, Real Madrid, CSKA Moscow, Olimpia Milano	1,874	4.63
4	(United States) Mike James	Baskonia, Panathinaikos, Olimpia Milano, CSKA Moscow, Monaco, **Anadolu Efes**	1,785	4.89
5	(Greece) Vassilis Spanoulis	Panathinaikos, Olympiacos	1,607	4.49
6	(Spain) Sergio Llull	**Real Madrid**	1,548	3.16
7	(Serbia) Miloš Teodosić	Olympiacos, CSKA Moscow, Virtus Bologna, Crvena zvezda	1,491	4.83
8	(France) Thomas Heurtel	Baskonia, Anadolu Efes, Barcelona, Real Madrid, ASVEL	1,474	5.30
9	(Argentina) Facundo Campazzo	**Real Madrid**, Crvena zvezda	1,394	5.55
10	(Serbia) Vasilije Micić	Bayern Munich, Crvena zvezda, Žalgiris, Anadolu Efes, **Hapoel Tel Aviv**	1,323	4.71
11	(France) Nando de Colo	Valencia, CSKA Moscow, Fenerbahçe, ASVEL	1,305	3.66
12	(United States) (Greece) Thomas Walkup	Žalgiris, Olympiacos, **Dubai**	1,257	4.41
13	(Greece) Dimitris Diamantidis	Panathinaikos	1,255	4.51
14	(United States) (Turkey) Shane Larkin	Baskonia, Anadolu Efes, **Fenerbahçe**	1,203	4.49
15	(United States) Wade Baldwin IV	Olympiacos, Bayern Munich, Baskonia, Maccabi Tel Aviv, **Fenerbahçe**	1,042	4.36
16	(Italy) (United States) Daniel Hackett	Olimpia Milano, Olympiacos, Brose Bamberg, CSKA Moscow, **Virtus Bologna**	1,020	2.66
17	(Greece) Theo Papaloukas	Olympiacos, CSKA Moscow, Maccabi Tel Aviv	977	3.88
18	(United States) (Spain) Lorenzo Brown	Crvena zvezda, Fenerbahçe, UNICS, Maccabi Tel Aviv, Panathinaikos, Olimpia Milano	956	4.53
19	(Czech Republic) Tomáš Satoranský	Barcelona, **Hapoel Tel Aviv**	937	4.28
20	(Brazil) (Italy) Marcelinho Huertas	Joventut Badalona, Baskonia, Barcelona, **Dubai**	894	3.89

Last updated: November 20, 2026

=== Steals ===
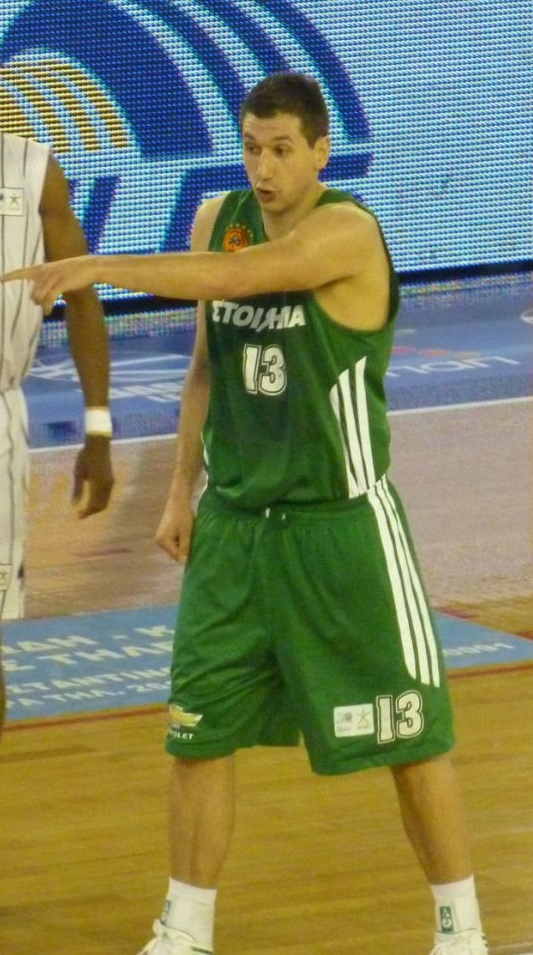
Dimitris Diamantidis has the 2nd most steals in Euroleague history and has been awarded EuroLeague Best Defender a record 6 times.

Rank	Player	Club(s)	Total	Per game
1	(Greece) (United States) Nick Calathes	Panathinaikos, Barcelona, Fenerbahçe, Monaco, Partizan	487	1.21
2	(Greece) Dimitris Diamantidis	Panathinaikos	434	1.56
3	(Czech Republic) Jan Veselý	Partizan, Fenerbahçe, Barcelona	403	0.97
4	(France) Nando de Colo	Valencia, CSKA Moscow, Fenerbahçe, ASVEL	377	1.06
5	(United States) Mike James	Baskonia, Panathinaikos, Olimpia Milano, CSKA Moscow, Monaco, **Anadolu Efes**	370	1.01
6	(Spain) Rudy Fernández	Joventut Badalona, Real Madrid	367	1.05
7	(Greece) Kostas Papanikolaou	**Olympiacos**, Barcelona	350	0.79
8	(Greece) Theo Papaloukas	Olympiacos, CSKA Moscow, Maccabi Tel Aviv	335	1.33
9	(Argentina) Facundo Campazzo	**Real Madrid**, Crvena zvezda	322	1.28
10	(Argentina) (Italy) Pablo Prigioni	Baskonia, Real Madrid	322	1.73
11	(United States) (Greece) Thomas Walkup	Žalgiris, Olympiacos, **Dubai**	320	1.12
12	(Italy) Nicolò Melli	Olimpia Milano, Brose Bamberg, **Fenerbahçe**	318	0.82
13	(Spain) Sergio Rodríguez	Estudiantes, Real Madrid, CSKA Moscow, Olimpia Milano	309	0.76
14	(Greece) Kostas Sloukas	Olympiacos, Fenerbahçe, **Panathinaikos**	299	0.64
15	(United States) (Turkey) Scottie Wilbekin	Darüşşafaka, Maccabi Tel Aviv, Fenerbahçe, **Beşiktaş**	298	1.14
16	(United States) (Turkey) Shane Larkin	Baskonia, Anadolu Efes, **Fenerbahçe**	296	1.10
17	(United States) Kyle Hines	Brose Bamberg, Olympiacos, CSKA Moscow, Olimpia Milano	287	0.68
18	(Serbia) Nikola Kalinić	Crvena zvezda, Fenerbahçe, Valencia, Barcelona	281	0.73
19	(United States) (Armenia) Bryant Dunston	**Olympiacos**, Anadolu Efes, Virtus Bologna, Žalgiris, Olimpia Milano	280	0.73
20	(Georgia (country)) Tornike Shengelia	Spirou Charleroi, Baskonia, CSKA Moscow, Virtus Bologna, Barcelona, **Dubai**	279	0.85
20	(Italy) (United States) Daniel Hackett	Olimpia Milano, Olympiacos, Brose Bamberg, CSKA Moscow, **Virtus Bologna**	279	0.73

Last updated: November 20, 2026

=== Blocks ===
Bryant Dunston has the 2nd most blocks in Euroleague history.

Rank	Player	Club(s)	Total	Per game
1	(Cape Verde) Edy Tavares	**Real Madrid**	559	1.70
2	(United States) (Armenia) Bryant Dunston	**Olympiacos**, Anadolu Efes, Virtus Bologna, Žalgiris, Olimpia Milano	377	0.98
3	(United States) Kyle Hines	Brose Bamberg, Olympiacos, CSKA Moscow, Olimpia Milano	320	0.75
4	(Greece) Georgios Papagiannis	Panathinaikos, Fenerbahçe, Monaco, **Anadolu Efes**	257	1.12
5	(Spain) Fran Vázquez	Unicaja Málaga, Barcelona	249	0.98
6	(United States) (Israel) Alex Tyus	Cantù, Maccabi Tel Aviv, Anadolu Efes, Galatasaray, Real Madrid, ASVEL	238	1.08
7	(France) Vincent Poirier	Baskonia, Real Madrid, Anadolu Efes	232	1.02
8	(Germany) Tibor Pleiß	Brose Bamberg, Baskonia, Barcelona, Galatasaray, Valencia, Anadolu Efes, Panathinaikos	229	0.67
9	(Czech Republic) Jan Veselý	Partizan, Fenerbahçe, Barcelona	223	0.54
10	(Greece) Ioannis Bourousis	AEK, Olympiacos, Olimpia Milano, Real Madrid, Baskonia, Panathinaikos	194	0.68
11	(Italy) Nicolò Melli	Olimpia Milano, Brose Bamberg, **Fenerbahçe**	185	0.48
12	(Serbia) Nikola Milutinov	Partizan, **Olympiacos**, CSKA Moscow	182	0.60
13	(France) Moustapha Fall	ASVEL, Olympiacos, **Panathinaikos**	177	0.94
14	(Gabon) Stéphane Lasme	Partizan, Maccabi Tel Aviv, Panathinaikos, Anadolu Efes	174	1.23
15	(United States) (Azerbaijan) Donta Hall	Monaco, Baskonia, **Olympiacos**	170	0.86
16	(United States) James Gist	Partizan, Fenerbahçe, Unicaja Málaga, Panathinaikos, Crvena zvezda, Bayern Munich, ASVEL	167	0.56
17	(Slovenia) (Bosnia and Herzegovina) Mirza Begić	Olimpija, Žalgiris, Real Madrid, Olympiacos, Baskonia	163	1.30
18	(Russia) Victor Khryapa	CSKA Moscow	161	0.67
19	(United States) Jordan Mickey	Khimki, Real Madrid, Zenit, Virtus Bologna	156	0.96
20	(Croatia) Ante Tomić	Real Madrid, Barcelona	155	0.55

Last updated: November 20, 2026

=== 3 Pointers made ===
Rank	Player	Club(s)	Total	%
1	(Spain) Sergio Llull	**Real Madrid**	715	0.328
2	(United States) Mike James	Baskonia, Panathinaikos, Olimpia Milano, CSKA Moscow, Monaco, **Anadolu Efes**	667	0.333
3	(United States) (Turkey) Scottie Wilbekin	Darüşşafaka, Maccabi Tel Aviv, Fenerbahçe, **Beşiktaş**	653	0.375
4	(Spain) Juan Carlos Navarro	Barcelona	623	0.373
5	(Spain) Sergio Rodríguez	Estudiantes, Real Madrid, CSKA Moscow, Olimpia Milano	609	0.384
6	(United States) (Turkey) Shane Larkin	Baskonia, Anadolu Efes, **Fenerbahçe**	606	0.407
7	(Serbia) Miloš Teodosić	Olympiacos, CSKA Moscow, Virtus Bologna, Crvena zvezda	595	0.374
8	(Spain) Rudy Fernández	Joventut Badalona, Real Madrid	594	0.359
9	(Greece) Kostas Sloukas	Olympiacos, Fenerbahçe, **Panathinaikos**	562	0.395
10	(France) Nando de Colo	Valencia, CSKA Moscow, Fenerbahçe, ASVEL	554	0.411
11	(France) Rodrigue Beaubois	Strasbourg, Baskonia, Anadolu Efes	528	0.418
12	(Greece) Vassilis Spanoulis	Panathinaikos, Olympiacos	518	0.320
13	(Spain) (Montenegro) Nikola Mirotić	Real Madrid, Barcelona, Olimpia Milano, Monaco, **Valencia**	495	0.399
14	(Greece) Kostas Papanikolaou	**Olympiacos**, Barcelona	472	0.366
15	(Serbia) Vasilije Micić	Bayern Munich, Crvena zvezda, Žalgiris, Anadolu Efes, **Hapoel Tel Aviv**	467	0.350
16	(Serbia) Nemanja Nedović	Lietuvos rytas, Valencia, Unicaja Málaga, Olimpia Milano, Panathinaikos, Crvena zvezda, Monaco	464	0.363
17	(Lithuania) Artūras Milaknis	Žalgiris	461	0.425
18	(Russia) Alexey Shved	CSKA Moscow, Khimki	459	0.347
19	(Serbia) Marko Gudurić	Crvena zvezda, Fenerbahçe, **Olimpia Milano**	452	0.387
20	(Bulgaria) (Cyprus) Aleksandar Vezenkov	Barcelona, **Olympiacos**	446	0.393

Last updated: November 20, 2026

== EuroLeague career statistical leaders 1958 to 2001 ==
The EuroLeague's career statistical leaders, from the 1958 FIBA European Champions Cup season to the 2000–01 FIBA SuproLeague season, when the competition was organized by FIBA.

=== Games played ===
Rank	Player	Club(s)	Games Played
1	(Israel) Miki Berkovich	Maccabi Tel Aviv, Hapoel Tel Aviv	205

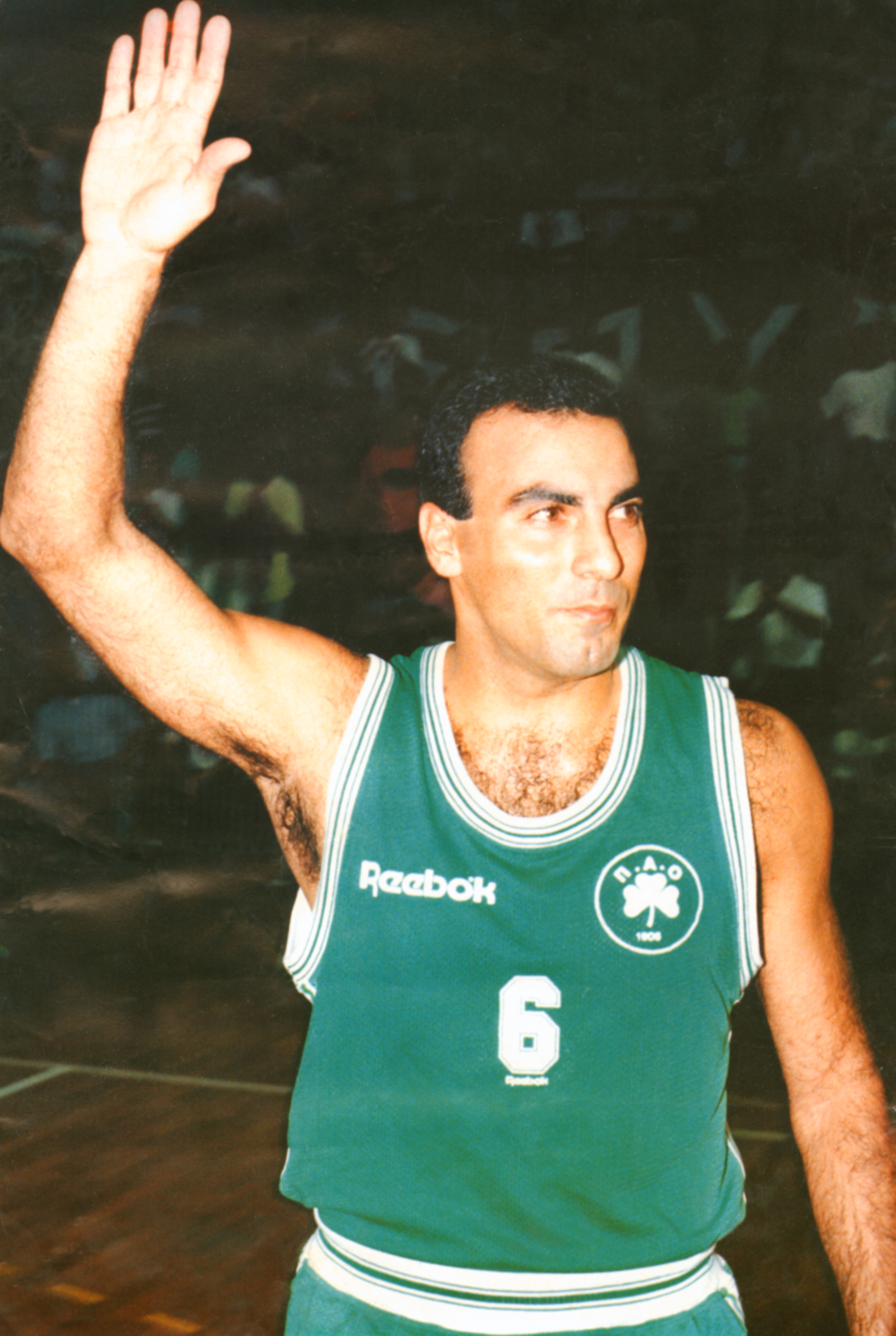
Nikos Galis has the most points in the pre-Euroleague era

=== Points scored (1,500+) ===
Rank	Player	Club(s)	Total	Games played	Per game
1	(Greece) (United States) Nikos Galis	Aris, Panathinaikos	4,047	125	32.4
2	(Israel) Miki Berkovich	Maccabi Tel Aviv, Hapoel Tel Aviv	3,619	205	17.7
3	(Spain) (United States) Wayne Brabender	Real Madrid	3,392	170	20.0
4	(Israel) Doron Jamchi	Maccabi Tel Aviv	3,087	175	17.6
5	(Spain) (United States) Clifford Luyk	Real Madrid	2,639	163	16.2
6	(United States) Walter Szczerbiak Sr.	Real Madrid	2,607	102	25.6
7	(Spain) Juan Antonio San Epifanio	Barcelona	2,308	133	17.4
8	(United States) Bob Morse	Varese	2,212	82	27.0
9	(Italy) Dino Meneghin	Varese, Olimpia Milano	2,138	183	11.7
10	(Italy) Antonello Riva	Cantù, Olimpia Milano, V.L. Pesaro	2,066	97	21.3
11	(Spain) Emiliano Rodríguez	Real Madrid	2,031	117	17.4
12	(Israel) (United States) Lou Silver	Maccabi Tel Aviv	1,999	138	14.5
13	(Socialist Federal Republic of Yugoslavia) (Serbia and Montenegro) Sasha Danilović	Partizan, Virtus Bologna	1,909	100	19.1
14	(Mexico) Manuel Raga	Varese, Federale Lugano	1,741	71	24.5
15	(Turkey) Harun Erdenay	Ülkerspor	1,638	102	16.1
16	(Greece) Panagiotis Giannakis	Aris, Panathinaikos	1,514	119	12.7

== EuroLeague career statistical leaders 1958 to present ==
The EuroLeague's career statistical leaders, including all of the games played, under all of the league's formats and organizing bodies, from the 1958 FIBA European Champions Cup season to the present. Games played and total points scored are the two major statistical categories that have overlapping leaders from the two eras of the competition, organized under both FIBA (1958 to 2001 SuproLeague) and the EuroLeague Commercial Assets (ECA) (2000 to present).

Played in both FIBA EuroLeague and EuroLeague Basketball
Only played in FIBA EuroLeague
Active EuroLeague player during the 2026–27 EuroLeague season

Bold indicates current club.

=== Points scored (2,000+) ===
Rank	Player	Club(s)	Total	Games played	Per game
1	(United States) Mike James	Baskonia, Panathinaikos, Olimpia Milano, CSKA Moscow, Monaco, **Anadolu Efes**	5,961	365	16.3
2	(France) Nando de Colo	Valencia, CSKA Moscow, Fenerbahçe, ASVEL	5,193	357	14.5
3	(Spain) (Montenegro) Nikola Mirotić	Real Madrid, Barcelona, Olimpia Milano, Monaco, **Valencia**	4,525	316	14.3
4	(Greece) Vassilis Spanoulis	Panathinaikos, Olympiacos	4,455	358	12.5
5	(Greece) Kostas Sloukas	Olympiacos, Fenerbahçe, **Panathinaikos**	4,447	469	9.5
6	(Czech Republic) Jan Veselý	Partizan, Fenerbahçe, Barcelona	4,379	414	10.6
7	(Spain) Sergio Llull	**Real Madrid**	4,358	490	8.9
8	(Spain) Juan Carlos Navarro	Barcelona	4,321	366	11.8
9	(Greece) (United States) Nikos Galis	Aris, Panathinaikos	4,047	125	32.4
10	(Georgia (country)) Tornike Shengelia	Spirou Charleroi, Baskonia, CSKA Moscow, Virtus Bologna, Barcelona, **Dubai**	4,007	329	12.2
11	(Bulgaria) (Cyprus) Aleksandar Vezenkov	Barcelona, **Olympiacos**	3,953	318	12.4
12	(United States) Will Clyburn	Darüşşafaka, CSKA Moscow, Anadolu Efes, Virtus Bologna, Barcelona, **Fenerbahçe**	3,922	286	13.6
13	(United States) (Turkey) Shane Larkin	Baskonia, Anadolu Efes, **Fenerbahçe**	3,905	268	14.6
14	(Spain) Sergio Rodríguez	Estudiantes, Real Madrid, CSKA Moscow, Olimpia Milano	3,772	405	9.3
15	(Serbia) Vasilije Micić	Bayern Munich, Crvena zvezda, Žalgiris, Anadolu Efes, **Hapoel Tel Aviv**	3,632	281	12.9
16	(Israel) Miki Berkovich	Maccabi Tel Aviv, Hapoel Tel Aviv	3,619	205	17.7
17	(Greece) Georgios Printezis	Olympiacos, Unicaja Málaga	3,599	375	9.6
18	(Serbia) Miloš Teodosić	Olympiacos, CSKA Moscow, Virtus Bologna, Crvena zvezda	3,420	309	11.1
19	(Greece) (United States) Nick Calathes	Panathinaikos, Barcelona, Fenerbahçe, Monaco, Partizan	3,418	402	8.5
20	(United States) (Turkey) Scottie Wilbekin	Darüşşafaka, Maccabi Tel Aviv, Fenerbahçe, **Beşiktaş**	3,403	261	13.0
21	(Spain) (United States) Wayne Brabender	Real Madrid	3,392	170	20.0
22	(United States) Kyle Hines	Brose Bamberg, Olympiacos, CSKA Moscow, Olimpia Milano	3,339	425	7.9
23	(United States) Wade Baldwin IV	Olympiacos, Bayern Munich, Baskonia, Maccabi Tel Aviv, **Fenerbahçe**	3,300	239	13.8
24	(Lithuania) Paulius Jankūnas	Žalgiris, Khimki	3,241	392	8.3
25	(France) Rodrigue Beaubois	Strasbourg, Baskonia, Anadolu Efes	3,221	322	10.0
26	(Serbia) Marko Gudurić	Crvena zvezda, Fenerbahçe, **Olimpia Milano**	3,176	332	9.6
27	(United States) (Serbia) Kevin Punter	Olympiacos, Crvena zvezda, Olimpia Milano, Partizan, **Barcelona**	3,146	210	15.0
28	(Cape Verde) Edy Tavares	**Real Madrid**	3,099	328	9.4
29	(Israel) Doron Jamchi	Maccabi Tel Aviv	3,087	175	17.6
30	(Serbia) Nikola Kalinić	Crvena zvezda, Fenerbahçe, Valencia, Barcelona	3,043	383	7.9
31	(Croatia) Nikola Vujčić	Split, ASVEL, Maccabi Tel Aviv, Olympiacos, Efes Pilsen	3,040	249	12.2
31	(Serbia) Nemanja Nedović	Lietuvos rytas, Valencia, Unicaja Málaga, Olimpia Milano, Panathinaikos, Crvena zvezda, Monaco	3,040	264	11.5
33	(Spain) Rudy Fernández	Joventut Badalona, Real Madrid	3,037	349	8.7
34	(Spain) Felipe Reyes	Estudiantes, Real Madrid	3,029	357	8.5
35	(Socialist Federal Republic of Yugoslavia) (Serbia and Montenegro) Dejan Bodiroga	Real Madrid, Panathinaikos, Barcelona, Virtus Roma	3,010	179	16.8
36	(Russia) Alexey Shved	CSKA Moscow, Khimki	3,006	187	16.1
37	(Greece) Kostas Papanikolaou	**Olympiacos**, Barcelona	2,926	444	6.6
38	(United States) (Uganda) Brandon Davies	Žalgiris, Barcelona, Olimpia Milano, Valencia, Partizan	2,862	263	10.9
39	(Denmark) (United States) Shavon Shields	Baskonia, Olimpia Milano, **Fenerbahçe**	2,829	234	12.1
40	(United States) (Armenia) Bryant Dunston	**Olympiacos**, Anadolu Efes, Virtus Bologna, Žalgiris, Olimpia Milano	2,817	384	7.3
41	(United States) (Azerbaijan) Zach LeDay	Olympiacos, Žalgiris, Olimpia Milano, Partizan, **Hapoel Tel Aviv**	2,790	239	11.7
42	(Lithuania) Edgaras Ulanovas	**Žalgiris**, Fenerbahçe	2,781	395	7.0
43	(Italy) Nicolò Melli	Olimpia Milano, Brose Bamberg, **Fenerbahçe**	2,780	388	7.2
44	(Croatia) Ante Tomić	Real Madrid, Barcelona	2,780	283	9.8
45	(Russia) (United States) J. R. Holden	AEK, CSKA Moscow	2,778	229	12.1
46	(United States) Cory Higgins	CSKA Moscow, Barcelona	2,764	238	11.6
47	(Italy) (United States) Daniel Hackett	Olimpia Milano, Olympiacos, Brose Bamberg, CSKA Moscow, **Virtus Bologna**	2,748	383	7.2
48	(Croatia) Mario Hezonja	Barcelona, Panathinaikos, UNICS	2,746	230	11.9
49	(United States) Marcus Brown	Treviso, Efes Pilsen, CSKA Moscow, Unicaja Málaga, Maccabi Tel Aviv, Žalgiris	2,739	179	15.3
50	(Germany) Tibor Pleiß	Brose Bamberg, Baskonia, Barcelona, Galatasaray, Valencia, Anadolu Efes, Panathinaikos	2,705	344	7.9
51	(Italy) (Slovenia) Gregor Fučka	Olimpia Milano, Fortitudo Bologna, Barcelona, Virtus Roma	2,681	218	12.3
52	(Serbia and Montenegro) (Serbia) Igor Rakočević	Crvena zvezda, Budućnost, Real Madrid, Baskonia, Efes Pilsen, Montepaschi Siena	2,671	185	14.4
53	(France) Thomas Heurtel	Baskonia, Anadolu Efes, Barcelona, Real Madrid, ASVEL	2,667	278	9.6
54	(Lithuania) Šarūnas Jasikevičius	Olimpija, Barcelona, Maccabi Tel Aviv, Panathinaikos, Lietuvos rytas, Fenerbahçe, Žalgiris	2,643	248	10.7
55	(Spain) (United States) Clifford Luyk	Real Madrid	2,639	163	16.2
56	(United States) (Ukraine) Walter Szczerbiak Sr.	Real Madrid	2,607	102	25.6
56	(United States) (Azerbaijan) Jaycee Carroll	Real Madrid	2,607	274	9.5
58	(France) Fabien Causeur	Cholet, Baskonia, Brose Bamberg, Real Madrid, Olimpia Milano	2,582	357	7.2
59	(Argentina) Facundo Campazzo	**Real Madrid**, Crvena zvezda	2,575	251	10.3
60	(United States) Elijah Bryant	Maccabi Tel Aviv, Anadolu Efes, **Hapoel Tel Aviv**	2,571	244	10.5
61	(United States) Nigel Hayes-Davis	Žalgiris, Barcelona, Fenerbahçe, **Panathinaikos**	2,567	240	10.7
62	(Germany) (Senegal) Maodo Lô	Brose Bamberg, Bayern Munich, Alba Berlin, Olimpia Milano, Paris, **Žalgiris**	2,546	297	8.6
63	(Slovenia) Jaka Lakovič	Krka, Panathinaikos, Barcelona, Galatasaray	2,524	218	11.6
64	(Greece) Dimitris Diamantidis	Iraklis, Panathinaikos	2,523	291	8.7
65	(United States) Mike Batiste	Spirou Charleroi, Panathinaikos, Fenerbahçe	2,496	237	10.5
66	(United States) (Poland) Jordan Loyd	Valencia, Crvena zvezda, Zenit, Monaco, Maccabi Tel Aviv, **Anadolu Efes**	2,489	206	12.1
67	(United States) James Gist	Partizan, Fenerbahçe, Unicaja Málaga, Panathinaikos, Crvena zvezda, Bayern Munich, ASVEL	2,485	297	8.4
68	(Serbia) Vladimir Lučić	Partizan, Valencia, **Bayern Munich**	2,456	260	9.4
69	(Greece) Fragiskos Alvertis	Panathinaikos	2,440	249	9.8
70	(Greece) Ioannis Bourousis	AEK, Olympiacos, Olimpia Milano, Real Madrid, Baskonia, Panathinaikos	2,408	284	8.5
71	(United States) (Greece) Tyler Dorsey	Maccabi Tel Aviv, **Olympiacos**, Fenerbahçe	2,404	219	11.0
72	(Serbia) Vladimir Micov	Baskonia, Cantù, CSKA Moscow, Galatasaray, Olimpia Milano	2,398	246	9.8
73	(United States) (Spain) Lorenzo Brown	Crvena zvezda, Fenerbahçe, UNICS, Maccabi Tel Aviv, Panathinaikos, Olimpia Milano	2,396	211	11.4
74	(Italy) Gianluca Basile	Fortitudo Bologna, Barcelona, Cantù, Olimpia Milano	2,384	244	9.8
75	(Serbia) Nikola Milutinov	Partizan, **Olympiacos**, CSKA Moscow	2,375	303	7.9
76	(France) Élie Okobo	ASVEL, Monaco, **Dubai**	2,353	195	12.1
77	(Greece) Antonis Fotsis	Panathinaikos, Real Madrid, Dynamo Moscow, Olimpia Milano	2,338	297	7.9
78	(Germany) Johannes Voigtmann	Baskonia, CSKA Moscow, Olimpia Milano, **Bayern Munich**	2,315	320	7.2
79	(Argentina) Luis Scola	Baskonia, Olimpia Milano	2,312	172	13.4
80	(Croatia) Krunoslav Simon	Zagreb, Unicaja Málaga, Lokomotiv Kuban, Olimpia Milano, Anadolu Efes	2,310	238	9.7
81	(Spain) Juan Antonio San Epifanio	Barcelona	2,308	133	17.4
82	(Australia) (Denmark) David Andersen	Virtus Bologna, CSKA Moscow, Barcelona, Fenerbahçe	2,295	224	10.3
83	(United States) Keith Langford	Khimki, Maccabi Tel Aviv, Olimpia Milano, UNICS, Panathinaikos	2,289	143	16.0
84	(Italy) Luigi Datome	Montepaschi Siena, Virtus Roma, Fenerbahce, Olimpia Milano	2,278	273	8.3
85	(United States) (Liberia) Othello Hunter	Montepaschi Siena, Olympiacos, Real Madrid, CSKA Moscow, Maccabi Tel Aviv, Bayern Munich	2,246	275	8.2
86	(United States) (Bosnia and Herzegovina) Alec Peters	CSKA Moscow, Anadolu Efes, Baskonia, Olympiacos, **Olimpia Milano**	2,239	280	8.0
87	(Turkey) (Serbia) Mirsad Türkcan	Efes Pilsen, CSKA Moscow, Montepaschi Siena, Ülkerspor, Fenerbahçe	2,236	195	11.5
88	(United States) Bob Morse	Varese	2,212	82	27.0
89	(United States) Carsen Edwards	Fenerbahçe, Bayern Munich, Virtus Bologna, **Žalgiris**	2,211	152	14.5
90	(United States) Kendrick Nunn	**Panathinaikos**	2,178	119	18.3
91	(United States) Trajan Langdon	Treviso, Efes Pilsen, CSKA Moscow	2,178	167	13.0
92	(United States) Devin Booker	Bayern Munich, Khimki, Fenerbahçe, **Olimpia Milano**	2,149	220	9.8
93	(Greece) Nikos Zisis	AEK, Treviso, CSKA Moscow, Montepaschi Siena, UNICS, Fenerbahçe, Brose Bamberg	2,140	310	6.9
94	(Italy) Dino Meneghin	Varese, Olimpia Milano	2,138	183	11.7
95	(Turkey) İbrahim Kutluay	Fenerbahçe, Efes Pilsen, AEK, Panathinaikos, Ülkerspor	2,134	162	13.2
96	(United States) Deshaun Thomas	Nanterre, Barcelona, Anadolu Efes, Maccabi Tel Aviv, Panathinaikos, Bayern Munich, Olimpia Milano, ASVEL	2,117	229	9.2
96	(Greece) Ioannis Papapetrou	Olympiacos, Panathinaikos, Partizan	2,117	299	7.1
98	(Turkey) Harun Erdenay	Ülkerspor	2,100	140	15.0
99	(Italy) Antonello Riva	Cantù, Olimpia Milano, V.L. Pesaro	2,066	97	21.3
100	(United States) (Guinea) Alpha Diallo	Monaco	2,063	190	10.9
101	(Slovenia) Erazem Lorbek	Fortitudo Bologna, Unicaja Málaga, Treviso, Virtus Roma, CSKA Moscow, Barcelona	2,038	223	9.1
102	(Spain) Emiliano Rodríguez	Real Madrid	2,031	117	17.4
103	(Croatia) Nikola Prkačin	Split, Cibona, Efes Pilsen, Panathinaikos	2,026	217	9.3
104	(Lithuania) Lukas Lekavičius	Žalgiris, Panathinaikos	2,014	307	6.6

Last updated: November 20, 2026
