= Nick Calathes =

Greek basketball player (born 1989)

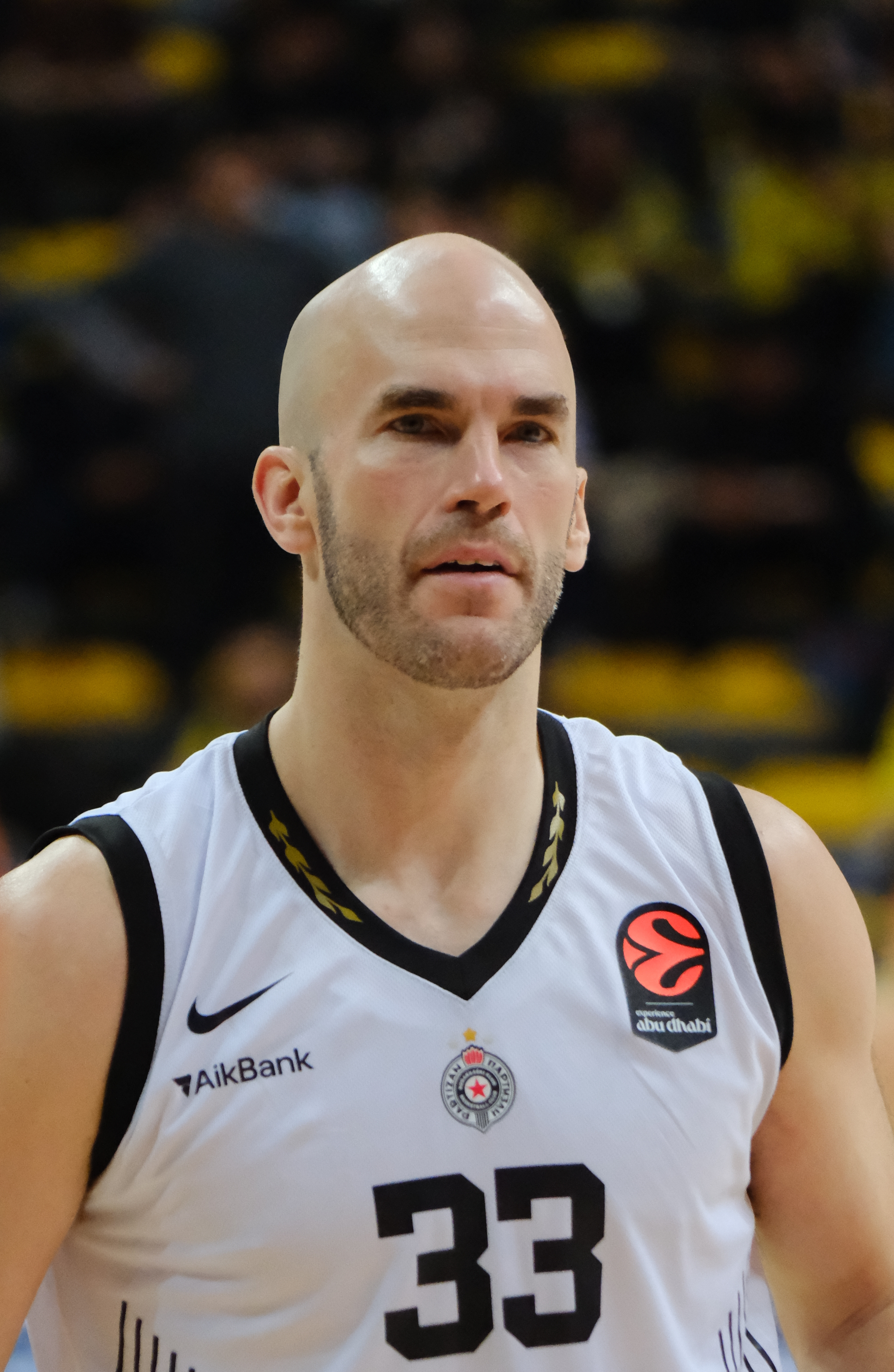
- Calathes with Partizan in 2026

No. 33 – PAOK Thessaloniki
- Position: Point guard
- League: Greek Basketball League; EuroCup

Personal information
- Born: February 7, 1989 (age 37) Casselberry, Florida, U.S.
- Listed height: 6 ft 6 in (1.98 m)
- Listed weight: 213 lb (97 kg)

Career information
- High school: Lake Howell (Winter Park, Florida)
- College: Florida (2007–2009)
- NBA draft: 2009: 2nd round, 45th overall pick
- Drafted by: Minnesota Timberwolves
- Playing career: 2009–present

Career history
- 2009–2012: Panathinaikos
- 2012–2013: Lokomotiv Kuban
- 2013–2015: Memphis Grizzlies
- 2015–2020: Panathinaikos
- 2020–2022: FC Barcelona
- 2022–2024: Fenerbahçe
- 2024–2025: AS Monaco
- 2025–2026: Partizan
- 2026–present: PAOK Thessaloniki

Career highlights
- EuroLeague champion (2011); 2× All-EuroLeague First Team (2018, 2019); 4× EuroLeague assists leader (2018–2020, 2022); 3× EuroLeague steals leader (2016, 2018, 2019); EuroCup champion (2013); EuroCup MVP (2013); All-EuroCup First Team (2013); EuroCup assists leader (2013); Turkish League champion (2024); Turkish Cup winner (2024); Turkish Cup Final MVP (2024); Liga ACB champion (2021); 2× Spanish Cup winner (2021, 2022); 6× Greek League champion (2010, 2011, 2017–2020); 4× Greek Cup winner (2012, 2016, 2017, 2019); 3× Greek League MVP (2017–2019); 3× Greek League Defensive Player of the Year (2016–2018); 5× Greek League assists leader (2016–2020); 3× Greek League steals leader (2012, 2016, 2018); 3× All-Greek League Team (2017–2019); 2× Greek League Most Popular Player (2018, 2019); Greek League Most Improved Player (2011); Greek Cup Finals MVP (2019); 4× Greek All-Star (2011, 2018–2020); All-VTB United League First Team (2013); All-Russian League Second Team (2013); SEC Rookie of the Year – AP (2008); First-team All-SEC (2009); McDonald's All-American (2007); First-team Parade All-American (2007); 2× Florida Mr. Basketball (2006, 2007); EuroLeague career stats leaders: EuroLeague all-time assists leader; EuroLeague all-time steals leader
- Stats at NBA.com
- Stats at Basketball Reference
Medals
Men's basketball
Representing Greece
FIBA EuroBasket
Bronze medal – third place	2009 Poland

Nicholas William Calathes (Greek: Νικόλαος Γουίλιαμ "Νικ" Καλάθης, born February 7, 1989) is a Greek American professional basketball player for PAOK Thessaloniki of the Greek Basketball League (GBL) and the EuroCup. He is widely considered as one of the best point guards in EuroLeague history.

After playing college basketball for the Florida Gators, Calathes won the EuroLeague title with Panathinaikos in 2011, and reached another final in 2021 with FC Barcelona. A two-time All-EuroLeague First Team selection, he is the EuroLeague all-time assists leader as well as the competition's all-time steals leader. Calathes represents the Hellenic national basketball team internationally, and won a bronze medal at EuroBasket 2009.

== Early life ==
His father started the Orlando Raptors, where he won several AAU Championships. He attended Lake Howell High School and graduated as the leading high school basketball scorer in Seminole County history. He teamed with future Florida Gator Chandler Parsons, future VCU Ram Joey Rodriguez, to help Lake Howell to a 31–3 record, and a state championship in 2007. At Lake Howell, Calathes twice won the Florida Mr. Basketball award, placing him on a long list of NBA players who have won that award, including Vince Carter, Amar'e Stoudemire, Brandon Knight, and Austin Rivers.

== College career ==
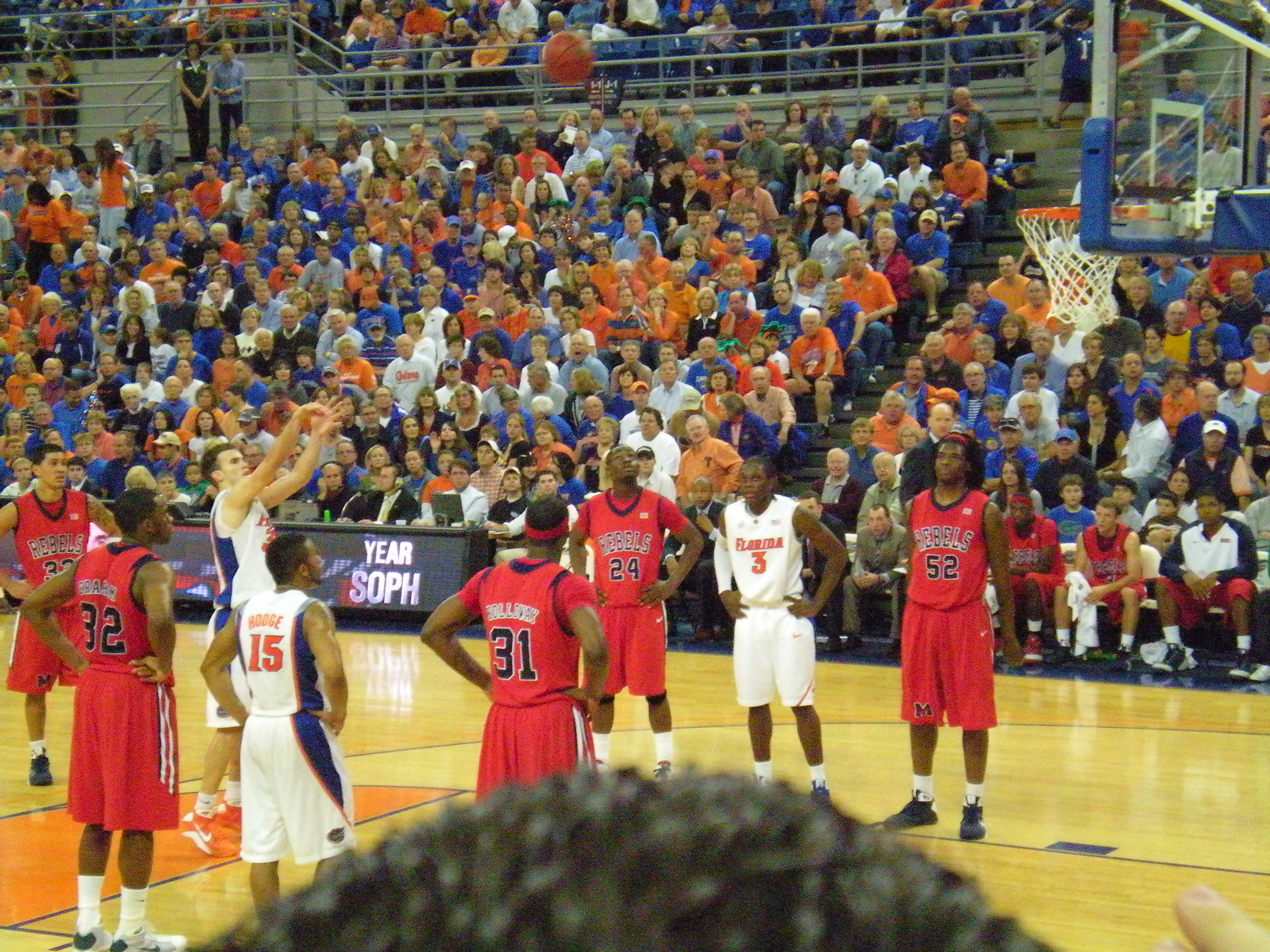
Calathes playing for the Florida Gators

Calathes accepted an athletic scholarship to attend the University of Florida, where he played for coach Billy Donovan's Florida Gators men's basketball team from 2007 to 2009. Calathes was considered one of the top play-making guards in college basketball. At 6 ft 6 in (1.98 m), he could play the positions of point guard, shooting guard, and small forward.

He was a first-team All-Southeastern Conference (SEC) selection in 2009, and he was the only player in the nation to average better than 15.0 points, 5.0 rebounds, and 6.0 assists per game. Calathes broke the Florida school records for assists and assists per game in each of his first two years, totaling 221 as a freshman (6.1 assists per game), and 231 (6.4 assists per game) as a sophomore. He ranked third in Florida school history in career assists after just two years. He was the SEC Newcomer of the Year and the SEC co-Freshman of the Year in 2008, as he led Florida in scoring and assists.

=== College career highs ===
College career highs
Stat	High	Opponent	Date
Points	33	Kentucky	February 10, 2009
Total Rebounds	13	Georgia	January 28, 2009
Assists	13	Georgia	February 14, 2009
Steals	5	Alabama	February 18, 2009

== Professional career ==
=== Panathinaikos (2009–2012) ===
On May 23, 2009, Calathes announced that he would bypass the NBA to play in the Greek Basket League. He agreed to terms with the elite EuroLeague club Panathinaikos Athens. The three-year deal paid Calathes around €2.4 million net income, in addition to providing him with a home, car, and endorsements, making for a total package commensurate with what the NBA rookie salary scale provided an early lottery selection. Despite his commitment to play in Greece, he was still selected in the second round of the 2009 NBA draft by the Minnesota Timberwolves. He was then traded to the Dallas Mavericks for a 2010 second-round draft pick and cash.

"Diamantidis was the MVP of the series, but Calathes was the key player."

— Xavi Pascual

In his first year with Panathinaikos, he won the Greek League championship, averaging 5.4 points, 2.0 assists, and 2.2 rebounds in 15 minutes per game. He also participated in the Greek Youth All-Star Game (for players age 22 and under), in which he scored six points and dished six assists. In 2010, Calathes was also voted the third best young player (age 22 and under) in the Greek League, after Nikos Pappas and Vangelis Mantzaris. In the 2010–11 season, Calathes had an average of 7.8 points, 3.2 assists, and 3.1 rebounds in the Greek League. He also participated in the senior men's HEBA Greek All-Star Game, replacing Theo Papaloukas (who was out with an injury), because he was 16th in the fan voting with 1,200 votes. Calathes scored 11 points and dished six assists in the All-Star Game.

In the EuroLeague 2010–11 playoffs, Calathes scored a career-high 12 points against Barcelona in game 4 of the playoff series. Barcelona head coach Xavi Pascual said, "Diamantidis was the MVP of the series, but Calathes was the key player." His teammate, Ian Vougioukas, stated about him, "Calathes played four outstanding games, especially on defense, and was a key for us." In the four-game playoff series against Barcelona, Calathes averaged 7.8 points, 2.5 rebounds, 2.3 assists, and a steal in 26 minutes per game.

In the 2010–11 EuroLeague semifinal against Montepaschi Siena, Calathes had another good performance, which helped send Panathinaikos to the 2011 EuroLeague Final. He scored 17 points, dished two assists to his teammates, and grabbed six rebounds. At the 2011 EuroLeague Final against Maccabi Tel Aviv, Calathes helped Panathinaikos, by scoring four points, recording six assists, and making two steals. Finally, Calathes won his first EuroLeague title. In the 2010–11 Greek League playoffs, Calathes had an average of 8.8 points, 3.0 rebounds, and 3.8 assists per game, in 23 minutes per game. He helped Panathinaikos to reach the Greek League Finals. He played especially good in the fourth game of the Greek League Finals, in which he had 16 points, 11 assists, and five rebounds, in 42 minutes. He won his second Greek League championship with Panathinaikos, and he was named to the Eurobasket.com website's All-Greek A1 League First Team and All-Defensive Team. He also won the Eurobasket.com website's Most Improved Player of the Year award.

=== Lokomotiv Kuban (2012–2013) ===
In the summer of 2012, Calathes signed a two-year contract with the Russian VTB United League team Lokomotiv Kuban Krasnodar. He signed a two-year €2.2 million net income contract. He was named to the First Team and selected the season MVP of Europe's 2nd-tier level competition, the EuroCup, in 2013.

=== Memphis Grizzlies (2013–2015) ===
On July 22, 2013, the Dallas Mavericks traded Calathes's draft rights to the Memphis Grizzlies in exchange for a 2016 second-round pick. On August 20, 2013, Calathes officially signed a two-year contract with the Grizzlies. In February 2014, starting for the injured Mike Conley Jr., he was named Rookie of the Month, averaging 10.7 points, 4.6 assists and 3.6 rebounds per game.

On April 18, 2014, just days before the 2014 postseason commenced, Calathes was suspended for 20 games for violating the NBA's anti-drug policy; the league stated that Calathes had tested positive for Tamoxifen, though there was no evidence indicating that Calathes had been testosterone doping or using any other performance-enhancing substance that would have been masked by the Tamoxifen. The NBA statement announcing the suspension, which took effect immediately, also indicated that the banned substance was an ingredient in a supplement that Calathes had been taking. Calling the suspension a "true injustice", acting NBPA Executive Director Ron Klempner indicated that the suspension would be appealed.

=== Return to Panathinaikos (2015–2020) ===
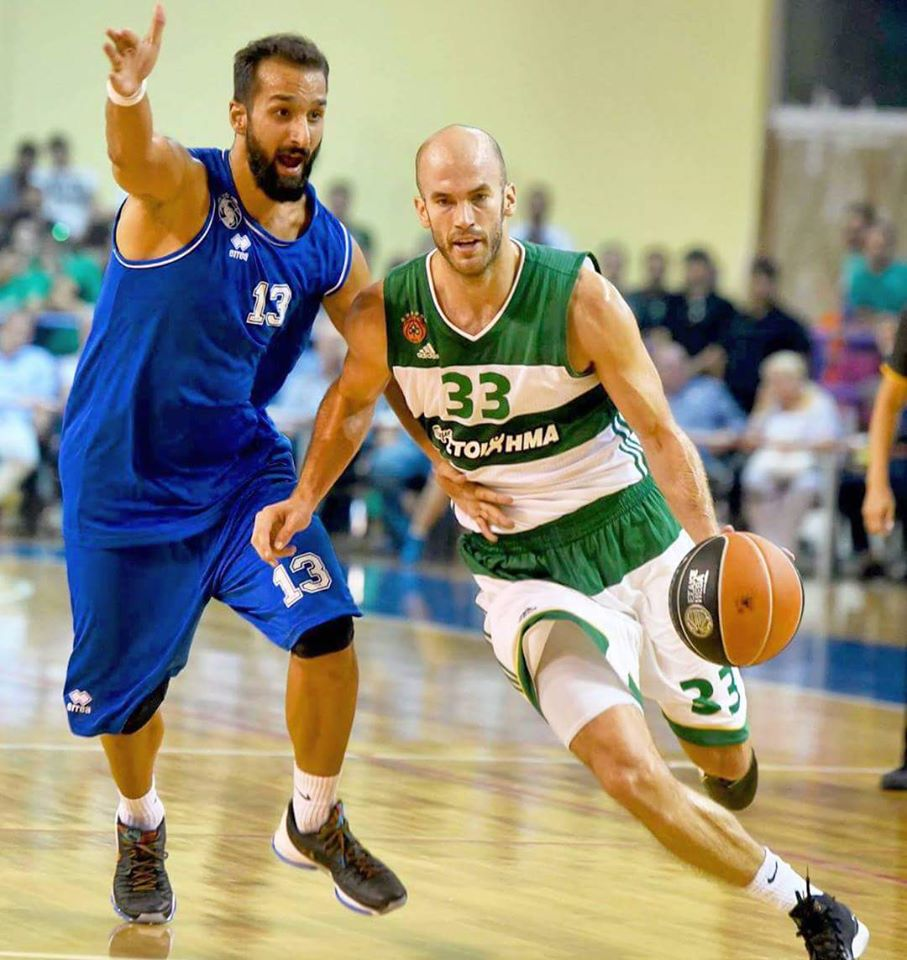
Calathes with Panathinaikos in 2016

On July 15, 2015, Panathinaikos announced the signing of Calathes for three years. It was reported that the net income of the deal was $7 million. On October 22, against the Turkish Super League club Karşıyaka Basket, Calathes set a new personal career-high of 11 assists in a EuroLeague game. On March 6, 2016, he won the Greek Cup for the second time in his career, having nine points, seven assists, and four rebounds in the Greek Cup Final. He was named the 2016 Greek League Best Defender. He won the Greek Cup again with Panathinaikos in 2017, as well as the Greek championship title.

In the summer of 2017, Calathes played in The Basketball Tournament on ESPN for Pedro's Posse. He competed for the $2 million prize, losing in the first round to Team 23, by a score of 107–92.

In the 2017–18 season, Calathes emerged as the team leader of Panathinaikos. Over 31 EuroLeague games, he averaged career-highs of 14.5 points and 8 assists per game. In May 2018, he was named to the All-EuroLeague First Team of the 2017–18 season.

On June 27, 2018, Calathes agreed to a €6.5 million net income contract extension with Panathinaikos, that would keep him in Athens through the 2020–21 season.

=== Barcelona (2020–2022) ===
On July 9, 2020, Calathes signed with FC Barcelona of the Spanish Liga ACB and EuroLeague. Calathes helped Barcelona to the top of the 2021–22 Spanish championship and to two consecutive Copa del Rey (2021 and 2022) wins. He would also reach the EuroLeague Final Four in both seasons with the Catalans, finishing as runners-up in 2021. While at Barcelona, Calathes would set several individual records, such as the all-time assist leader in the EuroLeague or the assist record in a EuroLeague Final Four. On June 23, 2022, Calathes was excluded from the plans of Barcelona coach, Šarūnas Jasikevičius, for the 2022–23 season, after arguments between the two ex-teammates and due to the decision of the Blaugrana to cut down on their budget.

=== Fenerbahçe (2022–2024) ===
On August 23, 2022, Calathes signed a two-year contract with Fenerbahçe of the Turkish Basketball Super League (BSL). In a highly successful 2023–24 season, which saw Calathes reunite with his former coach Jasikevičius, Fenerbahçe made its return to the EuroLeague Final Four after a five-year break. The team also won the Turkish League and the Turkish Cup.

=== AS Monaco (2024–2025) ===
On June 17, 2024, Calathes signed a two-year deal with AS Monaco of the French LNB Pro A and the EuroLeague, joining his former Panathinaikos teammate and EuroLeague all-time leading scorer Mike James.

=== Partizan (2025–2026) ===
On October 29, 2025, Calathes signed a deal until the end of season with Partizan of the Serbian League (KLS), the ABA League and the EuroLeague, reuniting with his former Panathinaikos head coach Željko Obradović.

=== PAOK Thessaloniki (2026–present) ===
On June 17, 2026, Calathes signed a two-year deal with PAOK Thessaloniki of the Greek Basketball League (GBL).

== National team career ==
=== Junior national team ===
Calathes made his debut with the Greek junior national team at the 2008 FIBA Europe Under-20 Championship, where he averaged 11.2 points, 3.5 rebounds, and 3.7 assists in 22 minutes per game. With the Under-20 Greek junior national basketball team, he played in 10 games in total, scoring 115 points, averaging 11.5 points per game.

=== Senior national team ===
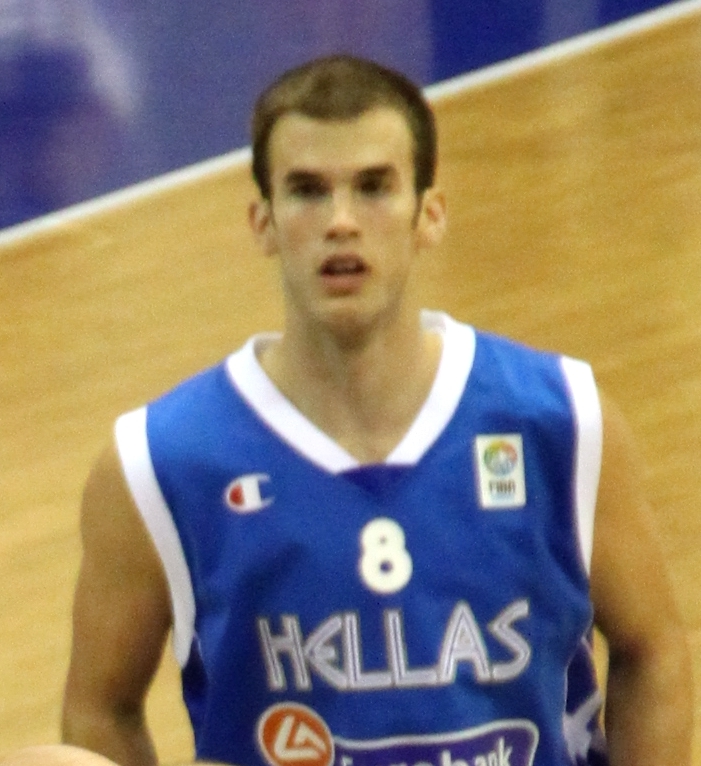
Calathes with the Greece men's national basketball team

In 2009, Calathes debuted with the Greece men's national basketball team, and with them he won the bronze medal at the EuroBasket 2009. At the 2009 EuroBasket, Calathes was 5th in the tournament in steals, with 1.6 per game, and he also averaged 4.1 points, 2.1 rebounds, and two assists, in 17 minutes per game. In the semifinal against Spain, despite his team losing the game, he scored 10 points, grabbed four rebounds, dished two assists, and made two steals.

The next summer, at the 2010 FIBA World Championship, Greece failed to win a medal. Calathes averaged 4.5 points, 2.2 rebounds, and 2.5 assists during the tournament. At the EuroBasket 2011, Calathes helped Greece to finish in sixth place, with averages of 9.2 points and 3.8 assists per game. He also played at the 2012 FIBA World Olympic Qualifying Tournament.

Calathes was suspended from competing in any FIBA competitions for four months, from April 2014 to August 2014, by WADA. This was due to his NBA suspension for violating the league's anti-drug policy, after he tested positive for Tamoxifen.

With Greece, he also played at the 2014 FIBA Basketball World Cup, the EuroBasket 2015, and the 2016 Turin FIBA World Olympic Qualifying Tournament. He also played with Greece at the EuroBasket 2017, and the 2019 FIBA World Cup qualification.

Calathes has played with the Greece men's national basketball team in 105 games to date, scoring 851 points, for an average of 8.1 points per game.

=== Greek senior national team stats ===
Year	Team	GP	GS	MPG	FG%	3P%	FT%	RPG	APG	SPG	BPG	PPG
2009 EB	Greece	8	1	17.3	.353	.182	.636	2.1	2.0	1.6	0.1	4.1
2010 WC	Greece	6	0	12.7	.491	.000	.625	2.2	2.5	.7	0.2	4.5
2011 EB	Greece	11	10	25.5	.418	.222	.784	2.6	3.8	1.6	0.1	9.2
2012 OQT	Greece	3	2	18.3	.429	.1000	.778	2.0	3.0	.7	0.0	7.3
2014 WC	Greece	6	6	26.2	.509	.375	.462	3.7	2.3	0.8	0.7	11.3
2015 EB	Greece	8	8	25.1	.556	.611	.667	2.3	5.3	0.8	0.1	9.9
2016 OQT	Greece	3	3	19.7	.412	.286	.000	2.3	5.3	1.7	0.3	5.3
2017 EB	Greece	7	7	27.7	.500	.333	.462	3.4	5.0	1.3	0.0	13.6
2019 WC	Greece	5	5	28.7	.491	.417	.429	4.4	5.4	1.6	0.0	13.4

== Personal life ==
Calathes was born to a Greek-American father and an Irish-American mother. He holds dual citizenship with the United States and Greece. He acquired his Greek passport on June 30, 2008, due to his Greek background. His paternal grandparents emigrated to Florida from the Greek island Lemnos. His older brother, Pat, is also a professional basketball player.

Calathes' last name in Greek translates as "basket" (καλάθι). In 2013, Calathes' son Luke was born.

== Career statistics ==
Legend
GP	Games played	GS	Games started	MPG	Minutes per game
FG%	Field-goal percentage	3P%	3-point field-goal percentage	FT%	Free-throw percentage
RPG	Rebounds per game	APG	Assists per game	SPG	Steals per game
BPG	Blocks per game	PPG	Points per game	PIR	Performance index rating
**Bold**	Career high

=== NBA ===
==== Regular season ====
Year	Team	GP	GS	MPG	FG%	3P%	FT%	RPG	APG	SPG	BPG	PPG
2013–14	Memphis	**71**	**7**	**16.5**	**.457**	**.311**	**.611**	**1.9**	**2.9**	.9	**.1**	**4.9**
2014–15	Memphis	58	0	14.4	.424	.256	.533	1.8	2.5	**1.1**	**.1**	4.2
Career		129	7	15.6	.441	.288	.581	1.9	2.7	1.0	.1	4.6

==== Playoffs ====
Year	Team	GP	GS	MPG	FG%	3P%	FT%	RPG	APG	SPG	BPG	PPG
2015	Memphis	9	3	14.0	.333	.462	.375	1.8	1.8	1.0	.1	3.7
Career		9	3	14.0	.333	.462	.375	1.8	1.8	1.0	.1	3.7

=== EuroLeague ===
†	Denotes season in which Calathes won the EuroLeague
*	Led the league

Year	Team	GP	GS	MPG	FG%	3P%	FT%	RPG	APG	SPG	BPG	PPG	PIR
2009–10	Panathinaikos	14	2	13.7	.386	.227	.455	1.9	1.7	.6	—	3.5	4.1
2010–11†	Panathinaikos	22	6	15.4	**.562**	.353	**.692**	1.6	1.5	.7	.1	4.8	5.0
2011–12	Panathinaikos	23*	14	23.5	.486	.298	.500	2.8	2.4	1.2	.0	7.6	8.3
2015–16	Panathinaikos	27	26	30.2	.417	.329	.568	4.1	6.4	**2.0***	**.2**	9.0	12.8
2016–17	Panathinaikos	33	33	27.2	.405	.246	.500	4.0	5.5	1.5	**.2**	9.8	11.7
2017–18	Panathinaikos	31	31	29.0	.476	.293	.576	3.8	8.0*	1.7*	.1	**14.5**	**18.5**
2018–19	Panathinaikos	33	33	31.0	.393	.265	.528	4.3	8.7*	1.7*	.1	12.2	15.8
2019–20	Panathinaikos	28*	28*	**32.2***	.420	.281	.594	**4.9**	**9.1***	1.1	.1	13.3	17.8
2020–21	Barcelona	**41***	37	25.1	.428	.327	.533	3.3	6.5	.9	**.2**	7.8	10.3
2021–22	Barcelona	29	27	24.5	.487	.317	.450	4.0	6.4*	1.1	.1	7.3	11.8
2022–23	Fenerbahçe	39	**39**	25.7	.440	.336	.382	4.0	4.9	1.1	.0	8.0	10.0
2023–24	Fenerbahçe	38	35	23.7	.464	**.357**	.513	4.2	4.8	1.1	**.2**	7.1	10.5
2024–25	Monaco	13	7	17.5	.362	.207	.000	2.2	3.8	.8	.1	3.7	4.5
2025–26	Partizan	31	5	19.2	.372	.293	.562	2.5	4.2	.9	.1	4.3	5.9
Career		402	323	25.0	.433	.297	.536	3.6	5.6	1.2	.1	8.5	11.1

=== EuroCup ===
Year	Team	GP	GS	MPG	FG%	3P%	FT%	RPG	APG	SPG	BPG	PPG	PIR
2012–13	Lokomotiv Kuban	17	15	33.8	.551	.275	.593	5.9	6.6	1.4	.1	12.9	17.2
Career		17	15	33.8	.551	.275	.593	5.9	6.6	1.4	.1	12.9	17.2

=== Domestic leagues ===
Year	Team	League	GP	MPG	FG%	3P%	FT%	RPG	APG	SPG	BPG	PPG
2009–10	(Greece) Panathinaikos	HEBA A1	30	16.0	.516	.364	.622	2.4	2.1	.9	.1	5.6
2010–11	(Greece) Panathinaikos	HEBA A1	34	19.9	.525	.279	.667	3.1	3.2	1.0	.1	7.8
2011–12	(Greece) Panathinaikos	HEBA A1	33	22.0	.476	.275	.537	2.3	3.0	1.7	.0	8.1
2012–13	(Russia) Lokomotiv Kuban	RPBL	9	30.6	.482	.300	.651	6.0	5.3	1.2	.2	12.9
2012–13	(Russia) Lokomotiv Kuban	VTBUL	16	31.0	.541	.414	.611	4.6	5.8	1.7	.1	15.0
2015–16	(Greece) Panathinaikos	GBL	34	28.0	.412	.261	.533	4.6	6.3	1.9	.3	8.6
2016–17	(Greece) Panathinaikos	GBL	35	23.3	.471	.368	.545	3.7	5.3	1.1	.1	9.5
2017–18	(Greece) Panathinaikos	GBL	35	22.0	.460	.318	.500	3.9	6.9	1.7	.1	10.4
2018–19	(Greece) Panathinaikos	GBL	27	22.7	.438	.378	.811	3.4	8.2	1.4	.0	9.8
2019–20	(Greece) Panathinaikos	GBL	19	17.0	.418	.419	.800	3.4	7.2	1.5	.0	6.8
2020–21	(Spain) Barcelona	ACB	40	20.0	.478	.393	.523	2.9	5.3	1.2	.1	8.1
2021–22	(Spain) Barcelona	ACB	39	22.5	.406	.288	.590	4.3	5.2	.8	.3	6.3
2022–23	(Turkey) Fenerbahçe	TBSL	20	22.5	.420	.329	.429	3.9	5.7	.9	—	7.7
2023–24	(Turkey) Fenerbahçe	TBSL	22	24.2	.472	.458	.700	3.9	7.8	.9	.1	6.8

=== College ===
Year	Team	GP	GS	MPG	FG%	3P%	FT%	RPG	APG	SPG	BPG	PPG
2007–08	Florida	**36**	**36**	32.6	.426	.367	**.724**	5.2	6.1	1.6	.1	15.3
2008–09	Florida	36	35	**33.3**	**.482**	**.390**	.707	**5.3**	**6.4**	**1.9**	**.2**	**17.2**
Career		72	71	33.0	.455	.380	.715	5.3	6.3	1.8	.1	16.3

== See also ==
- List of European basketball players in the United States
- List of people banned or suspended by the NBA
