= Dimitris Diamantidis =

Greek basketball player (born 1980)

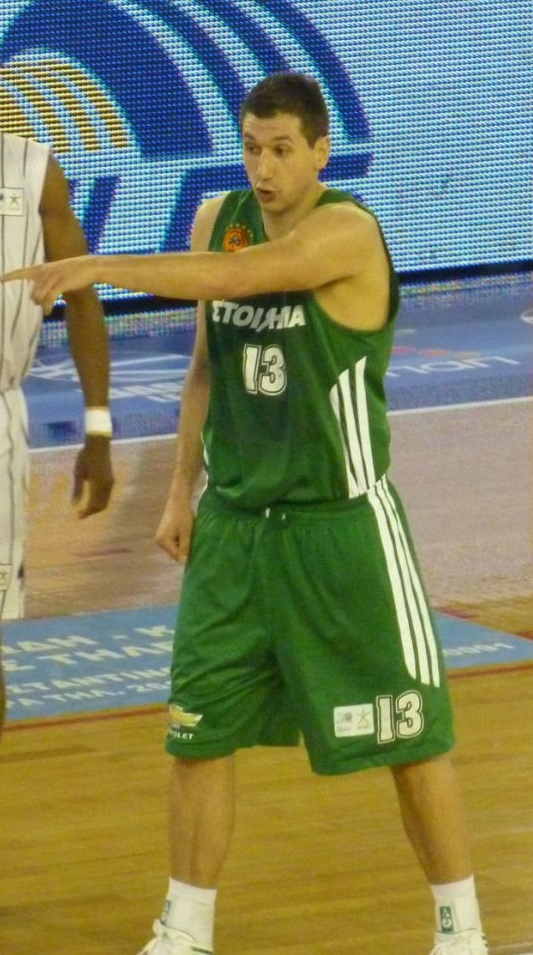
- Diamantidis with Panathinaikos in 2013

Panathinaikos
- Title: Executive consultant
- League: Greek Basketball League; EuroLeague

Personal information
- Born: May 6, 1980 (age 46) Kastoria, Greece
- Listed height: 6 ft 5 in (1.96 m)
- Listed weight: 195 lb (88 kg)

Career information
- Playing career: 1999–2016
- Position: Point guard
- Number: 13

Career history
- 1999–2004: Iraklis Thessaloniki
- 2004–2016: Panathinaikos

Career highlights
- As a player: 3× EuroLeague champion (2007, 2009, 2011); EuroLeague MVP (2011); 2× EuroLeague Final Four MVP (2007, 2011); 4× All-EuroLeague First Team (2007, 2011–2013); 6× EuroLeague Best Defender (2005–2009, 2011); 2× EuroLeague assists leader (2011, 2014); EuroLeague 2000–2010 All-Decade Team (2010); EuroLeague 2010–2020 All-Decade Team (2020); EuroLeague 25th Anniversary Team (2025); EuroLeague Legend (2016); 101 Greats of European Basketball (2018); 2× Triple Crown winner (2007, 2009); FIBA EuroStar (2007); 9× Greek League champion (2005–2011, 2013, 2014); Greek League Hall of Fame (2022); 10× Greek Cup winner (2005–2009, 2012–2016); 6× Greek League MVP (2004, 2006–2008, 2011, 2014); 4× Greek League Finals MVP (2006, 2007, 2011, 2014); Greek League Defensive Player of the Year (2011); 11× All-Greek League Team (2004–2008, 2010–2014, 2016); Greek League assists leader (2007); 2× Greek Cup Finals MVP (2009, 2016); 2× Greek Cup Finals Top Scorer (2009, 2013); Greek League Most Popular Player (2016); Mister Europa Player of The Year (2007); Greek Male Athlete of the Year (2007); EuroBasket Dream Team (2020); 2× Acropolis Tournament MVP (2005, 2006); No. 13 retired by Panathinaikos (2016); Greek League Hall of Fame (2022); Greek League career stats leaders: Greek League all-time leader in steals

Career SuproLeague / EuroLeague statistics
- Points: 2,523 (8.7 ppg)
- Rebounds: 993 (3.4 rpg)
- Assists: 1,270 (4.4 apg)
Medals
Event	1st	2nd	3rd
FIBA World Cup	0	1	0
FIBA Stanković World Cup	1	0	0
FIBA EuroBasket	1	0	0
Mediterranean Games	0	1	0
Total	2	2	0
Men's basketball
Representing Greece
FIBA World Cup
Silver medal – second place	2006 Japan	
FIBA Stanković World Cup
Gold medal – first place	2006 China	
FIBA EuroBasket
Gold medal – first place	2005 Serbia & Montenegro	
Mediterranean Games
Silver medal – second place	2001 Tunisia	Under-26

Dimitrios 'Dimitris' Diamantidis (Greek: Δημήτριος Διαμαντίδης Greek pronunciation: [ðiˈmi.tɾis ðʝa.maˈdi.ðis]; born 6 May 1980) is a retired Greek professional basketball player who spent most of his career with Panathinaikos and now serves the team in a managerial role.

Dimitris is highly decorated in European basketball, having been named a EuroLeague Legend in 2016. He is also the only Greek player who is a member of both the EuroLeague 2000–2010 All-Decade Team and the EuroLeague 2010–2020 All-Decade Team.

At the age of fourteen, Diamantidis started his basketball career with the youth clubs of his hometown team, AS Kastoria. A year later, he made his professional debut with Iraklis Thessaloniki, and two years later by 2003, he had emerged as an all-around star in the Greek League. He became a member of Panathinaikos Athens in the summer of 2004, with whom he won three EuroLeague titles, in 2007, 2009, and 2011, with the last two coming as the team's captain. Diamantidis' numerous accolades in the premier European club competition include a EuroLeague MVP Award, two EuroLeague Final Four MVP Awards, four All-EuroLeague First Team selections, as well as a record six EuroLeague Best Defender Awards. He is the EuroLeague's all-time leader in steals since the stat was first officially recognized starting with the 1991–92 season. On 1 April 2016, he was honored with a EuroLeague Basketball Legend Award.

Amidst a long series of "derbies of the eternal enemies", opposing Panathinaikos and Olympiacos Piraeus, Diamantidis thrived, as he faced Olympiacos every year for twelve consecutive seasons, including in eleven Greek League Finals, six Greek Cup Finals, and a EuroLeague semifinal. He won nine Greek League and ten Greek Cup titles, alongside four Greek League Finals MVP and a record six Greek League MVP awards, as well as two Greek Cup MVP awards. Diamantidis' personal friendship and rivalry with Olympiacos star Vassilis Spanoulis was at the center of attention throughout six Greek League Finals and three Greek Cup Finals encounters. Diamantidis' self-effacing psyche helped relieve tension between the two powerhouses, when he retired in 2016.

Dimitris Diamantidis is regarded as one of the greatest players in EuroLeague history, and by many as the greatest. Kobe Bryant once said he would have loved to play alongside Diamantidis, praising his defensive abilities.

== Early years ==
Diamantidis was born in Kastoria, Greece, on 6 May 1980. He began playing basketball with the youth teams of the local club AS Kastoria. The club would later go on to name its home arena, Dimitris Diamantidis Indoor Hall, in his honor.

== Professional career ==
=== Iraklis Thessaloniki ===
In summer 1999, at age 19, Diamantidis began his professional career, when he signed with the Greek Basket League club Iraklis Thessaloniki. In his first pro season, in the 1999–00 Greek League season, he averaged 1.5 points, 1.6 rebounds, 0.8 assists, 0.8 steals, and 0.3 blocks per game. In his first season with the club, Diamantidis also played in the European-wide secondary league, the FIBA Saporta Cup. Diamantidis averaged 1.8 points, 1.2 rebounds, 0.4 assists, and 1.2 steals per game, during the Saporta Cup 1999–00 season.

In his second season with the club, in the 2000–01 Greek League season, he upped his averages to 3.4 points, 2.8 rebounds, 1.7 assists, 0.8 steals, and 0.3 blocks per game. Diamantidis also played in what was one of the two premier European-wide club competitions at that time, the FIBA SuproLeague. He averaged 2.2 points, 1.8 rebounds, 1.2 assists, 1.4 steals, and 0.6 blocks per game, during the SuproLeague's 2000–01 season.

In his third season with Iraklis, he continued to up his numbers in the Greek League, as he averaged 6.2 points, 4.7 rebounds, 2.8 assists, 1.5 steals, and 0.4 blocks per game, during the 2001–02 Greek League season. He was selected to the Greek League's All-Star Game, for the first time that season. Diamantidis also once again played in the Pan-European secondary league, in which he averaged 7.1 points, 5.2 rebounds, 2.8 assists, 1.7 steals, and 0.8 blocks per game, during the Saporta Cup's 2001–02 season.

In his fourth season with Iraklis, Diamantidis only played in the national domestic Greek Basket League. He continued to improve his individual numbers and performances, as he averaged 11.5 points, 5.6 rebounds, 5.0 assists, a league-leading 2.5 steals, and 0.9 blocks per game, during the 2002–03 Greek League season. He was also once again voted to the Greek League's All-Star Game.

In his fifth and final season with Iraklis, Diamantidis had his best year with the club. He averaged 14.8 points, 6.3 rebounds, 4.2 assists, a league-leading 2.5 steals, and 0.7 blocks per game, during the 2003–04 Greek League season. Due to his play, he was again voted to the Greek League's All-Star Game, and at the end of the season, he was also named the Greek League's MVP for the season. During his five seasons with Iraklis, one of the oldest Greek clubs, Diamantidis managed to help bring the team back into prominence in Greek competitions, after the club had been struggling in previous years.

=== Panathinaikos Athens ===
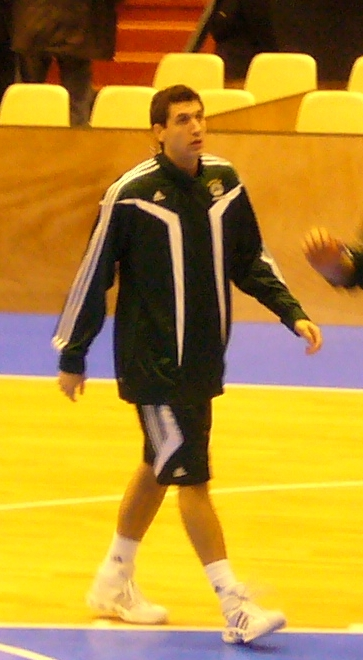
Diamantidis in 2007

After his continued improvement and success with Iraklis, Diamantidis made a big step up in his career, with his move to Panathinaikos of Athens, in 2004; a basketball powerhouse of the Greek Basket League, and also of the EuroLeague. During his career with Panathinaikos, Diamantidis was given the nickname of "3-D", which stood for "Dimitris Diamantidis Defense" by the club's fans. Due to great individual and team successes, the late pharmaceutical magnate Pavlos Giannakopoulos, who was at that time the President of Panathinaikos, signed Diamantidis in 2008, to a 3-year, €5.7 million net income contract extension. In 2010, Diamantidis again renewed his contract with Panathinaikos for another 3 years, at €10.8 million gross income (€6 million net income). On 21 February 2013 Diamantidis became the EuroLeague's career leader in steals.

On 4 July 2013 Diamantidis renewed his contract with Panathinaikos for another 2 years, at a salary of €1.9 million net income per year. On 30 October 2014 Diamantidis became the first player in EuroLeague history to have dished out 1,000 career assists. On 2 September 2015 Diamantidis announced his retirement from playing professional club basketball, effective at the end of the 2015–16 Greek League season. In his last season with Panathinaikos, he was voted the Greek League Most Popular Player. Diamantidis retired as the all-time career leader in both assists and Performance Index Rating (PIR) in the entire history of the EuroLeague. Those records were eventually broken.

While he was a member of Panathinaikos, Diamantidis and Željko Obradović shared one of the most successful collaborations between a player and his head coach in the history of European club basketball. During his time with Panathinaikos, Diamantidis won the EuroLeague championship three times (2007, 2009, 2011), the Greek League championship nine times (2005, 2006, 2007, 2008, 2009, 2010, 2011, 2013, 2014), and the Greek Cup title ten times (2005, 2006, 2007, 2008, 2009, 2012, 2013, 2014, 2015, 2016). He also won the Triple Crown in 2007 and 2009.

Diamantidis also won several individual trophies with Panathinaikos, such as: the EuroLeague MVP in 2011, the EuroLeague Final Four MVP twice (2007, 2011), the EuroLeague Best Defender six times (2005, 2006, 2007, 2008, 2009, 2011), five of his six total Greek League MVP awards (2006, 2007, 2008, 2011, 2014), the Greek League Finals MVP four times (2006, 2007, 2011, 2014), and the MVP of the Greek Cup in 2009 and 2016. While he was a member of Panathinaikos, Diamantidis was also named the 2007 Mister Europa, and the 2007 Greek Athlete of the Year.

After he ended his playing career, Diamantidis had his #13 playing jersey officially retired by Panathinaikos. In 2020, Diamantidis was named "The Best Greek Professional Basketball Player of The 2010s Decade", by the readers of the Greek website Gazzetta.gr. In 2022, he became a member of the Greek Basket League Hall of Fame.

== National team career ==
Diamantidis was a member of the Greek under-20 junior national team. He played with Greece's under-20 junior national team at the 2000 FIBA Europe Under-20 Championship, where Greece finished in seventh place. He averaged 3.0 points, 3.4 rebounds, 1.3 assists, and 2.5 steals per game at the tournament. As a part of the Greek men's under-26 national selection, Diamantidis won the silver medal at the 2001 Mediterranean Games.

Diamantidis was also a member of the Greece men's national basketball team. With Greece's senior team, he won the gold medal at the 2006 FIBA Stanković World Cup, and seven Acropolis Tournaments, while also being named the tournament's MVP twice, in 2005 and 2006.

On 4 September 2010, after Greece's elimination in the Eighth-Finals of the 2010 FIBA World Cup, at the hands of Spain (by a score of 80–72), Diamantidis announced his immediate retirement from the Greece National Team. He had 16 points, 4 rebounds, 2 assists, 2 steals, and 2 blocks in his last game with Greece's national team. He finished his career bearing the Greek flag, having played in 124 games, and having scored a total of 760 points, for a scoring average of 6.13 points per game.

=== FIBA EuroBasket ===
With the Greece men's national basketball team, Diamantidis participated at the 2003 EuroBasket, where Greece finished in fifth place, after beating Serbia and Montenegro, by a score of 72–64. Diamantidis won the gold medal at the 2005 EuroBasket. During the FIBA EuroBasket that year, he led the tournament in assists, and was selected to the All-Tournament Team. In the tournament's semifinals against the French national team, Diamantidis hit a game-winning three-point shot, with Greece trailing by a score of 66–64, at the end of the game, to give Greece a 67–66 victory, and send them to the European Championship's final game.

Diamantidis made 7 points, 7 rebounds, 4 assists, and 2 blocks for Greece at the 2007 EuroBasket, losing the bronze medal to Lithuania, 78–69. He was named to the FIBA EuroBasket 2000–2020 Dream Team in 2020.

=== FIBA World Cup ===
Diamantidis won the silver medal with Greece at the 2006 FIBA World Cup, which was held in Japan. In the tournament's semifinals, he was a key factor in Greece's historic 101–95 victory against Team USA, with 12 points, 3 rebounds, 5 assists, and 2 steals, while facing the likes of LeBron James, Dwyane Wade, Carmelo Anthony, Chris Bosh, Chris Paul, and Dwight Howard. The defeat suffered by the United States team was the only one during Mike Krzyzewski's second era as the team's head coach (2005–2016). Coach Krzyzewski, in a press conference during the 2014 FIBA World Cup, stated: "2006, that's a lesson we learned. The Greek Team taught us (Team USA) how to play internationally."

Diamantidis also represented Greece at the 2010 FIBA World Cup. He averaged 10.0 points, 3.5 rebounds, 3.8 assists, 1.5 steals, and 0.5 blocks per game at that tournament.

=== Summer Olympic Games ===
Diamantidis was a member of Greece's senior national team that competed at the 2004 Athens Summer Olympics. He was also selected to play on Greece's senior national team for the 2008 Beijing Summer Olympics. Greece finished in fifth place in both tournaments, losing both times to Argentina in the quarterfinals.

== Managerial career ==
Four years after retiring from professional basketball, Diamantidis was appointed general manager of Panathinaikos. During his two-year stint in the role, Diamantidis helped guide the club to three trophies: the 2020–21 Greek Basket League championship, the 2020–21 Greek Basketball Cup, and the 2021 Greek Basketball Super Cup.

In July 2026, it was announced that Diamantidis, alongside longtime teammate Mike Batiste, would return to Panathinaikos to work with newly appointed head coach Željko Obradović, in a managerial capacity. Although he was not given a specific job title, Diamantidis said, “Job titles are of no importance; we will find it along the way. What counts is that we all work for the team that we love and achieve our goals.”

== Player profile ==
Standing 6 ft 5 in, the left-handed guard was listed by various sources at between 82 and 100 kg and possessed an exceptional 7 ft 1 in wingspan. He was known for his strong point-of-attack defense, possessing the mobility and length needed to disrupt the rhythm of quicker guards while also having the size and strength to defend larger wings. He was even more effective at disrupting passing lanes, often making it difficult for opposing teams to initiate offense on his side of the floor. With six EuroLeague Best Defender awards, he holds the all-time league record.

While scoring was not Diamantidis’ primary strength, he had a tight handle and an unpredictable change-of-pace that made it difficult for even elite defenders to stay in front of him. He possessed strong lateral quickness, covered ground efficiently, and consistently matched elite guards in transition. Despite not possessing the elite athleticism of the NBA's most athletic players, he demonstrated the ability to stay stride-for-stride with players such as Chris Paul in the open floor, highlighted by a chasedown block on him, while having routinely produced timely chasedown blocks against top-level EuroLeague competition.

He was generally a good three-point shooter, particularly in spot-up situations. However, as he was increasingly tasked with creating his own perimeter shots as his team's floor general, his efficiency fluctuated. Over a five-season stretch from 2010 to 2015, he significantly increased his three-point volume compared to previous years, producing immediate results. He shot 37.0% from beyond the arc in the first season of that stretch and an outstanding 42.5% in the second. His efficiency declined in the following seasons, however, including one campaign in which he shot just 28.3%. He averaged 35.4% from three-point range on 4.6 attempts per game across the five-season period. He concluded his 12-season EuroLeague career as a 37.5% three-point shooter overall. His single-game career high came during the 2011–12 season, when he knocked down seven three-pointers against Unicaja Málaga.

Diamantidis accepted whatever role his team required. Although he began his EuroLeague career as Panathinaikos’ starting point guard, he willingly ceded much of the playmaking duties after Vassilis Spanoulis arrived the following season, embracing a 3-and-D role while serving as the team's secondary playmaker. He remained in that role throughout Spanoulis’ four seasons with the team, sacrificing individual production and minutes in the interest of team success. Diamantidis was even used as a reserve in the 2009 EuroLeague championship game. His statistical production during his four-season stretch with Spanoulis reflected his commitment to that role. Over that stretch, Diamantidis averaged 8.8 PPG, 4.3 RPG, 3.1 APG, 1.8 SPG, 0.6 BPG, and 42.4% from three-point range. After Spanoulis joined Olympiacos following the 2009–10 season, Diamantidis became Panathinaikos’ primary floor general for the 2010–11 season, after spending the previous seasons as the team's secondary playmaker. He proceeded to lead the EuroLeague in APG while winning the EuroLeague MVP, EuroLeague Best Defender, and EuroLeague Final Four MVP awards. He remains the only player in EuroLeague history to win all three awards in the same season.

By the time of the 2011 Final Four, Diamantidis had cemented his status as one of the greatest passers in the history of European basketball. His elite size and IQ at the guard position allowed him to see over defenses and deliver precise, sharp passes of every kind — especially lobs. He was also dangerous in the open court, excelling at drive-and-kick reads and pulling off creative no-look passes. In addition, he could fire accurate outlet passes with either hand. His playmaking impact was evident as he once again led the EuroLeague in APG in 2014, after previously doing so in 2011.

Beyond his playmaking, he is frequently cited as one of the greatest clutch performers in the history of European basketball.

His defense, mastery of operating the pick-and-roll, and consistency in the clutch became hallmarks of his career.

As a member of the Greece men's national basketball team, Diamantidis won a EuroBasket gold medal in 2005; while anchoring a defense that allowed just 59.7 points per game. He also scored the iconic three-pointer that sealed the fate of the semifinal game against France, just seconds before the game's final buzzer. He also led that tournament in assists, and was a part of the All-EuroBasket Team. In 2006, he played a pivotal role in a FIBA World Cup silver medal campaign, with Greece stunning Team USA in the semifinals, and Diamantidis finishing as the competition's steals leader. Diamantidis was also a two-time Olympian, as he donned the Greek colours in 2004 and 2008, and on both occasions earned the fifth place of the tournament, which is tied for the all-time best finish for Greece. On the basis of his myriad achievements, he was named the Mister Europa Player of the Year by Italian sports magazine Superbasket in 2007. He was also named the Greek Male Athlete of the Year in 2007. He was inducted into the Greek Basket League Hall of Fame in 2022.

== Career statistics ==
Legend
GP	Games played	GS	Games started	MPG	Minutes per game
FG%	Field-goal percentage	3P%	3-point field-goal percentage	FT%	Free-throw percentage
RPG	Rebounds per game	APG	Assists per game	SPG	Steals per game
BPG	Blocks per game	PPG	Points per game	PIR	Performance index rating
**Bold**	Career high

=== EuroLeague ===
†	Denotes season in which Diamantidis won the EuroLeague
*	Led the league

Year	Team	GP	GS	MPG	FG%	3P%	FT%	RPG	APG	SPG	BPG	PPG	PIR
FIBA SuproLeague
2000–01	Iraklis	13	0	14.2	.269	.200	.750	1.8	1.2	1.4	.6	2.2	3.2
Career SL		13	0	14.2	.269	.200	.750	1.8	1.2	1.4	.6	2.2	3.2
EuroLeague
2004–05	Panathinaikos	25	20	27.4	.544	.467	.709	3.7	3.1	2.0	.6	8.5	12.5
2005–06	Panathinaikos	23	22	30.1	.492	.269	.785	4.5	2.9	**2.3**	**.8**	8.7	13.1
2006–07†	Panathinaikos	24	24	29.1	.489	.460	.780	3.9	3.9	2.2	.6	8.9	14.3
2007–08	Panathinaikos	19	19	30.9	.484	.435	.769	**5.3**	3.3	1.8	.7	8.5	15.1
2008–09†	Panathinaikos	21	12	27.3	.486	.441	.863	4.4	3.1	1.5	.5	8.5	14.0
2009–10	Panathinaikos	12	9	26.7	**.559**	**.516**	.738	2.9	3.3	1.5	.3	9.4	13.7
2010–11†	Panathinaikos	22	21	30.5	.433	.370	.872	3.9	**6.2***	1.6	.1	**12.5**	**18.5**
2011–12	Panathinaikos	23*	21*	30.0	.448	.425	**.882**	3.7	4.8	1.5	.5	11.5	16.4
2012–13	Panathinaikos	27	25	**31.5**	.368	.315	.712	3.4	5.8	1.4	.4	8.1	13.1
2013–14	Panathinaikos	**29**	**27**	31.2	.324	.283	.763	2.4	**6.2***	1.4	.1	8.9	12.8
2014–15	Panathinaikos	27	**27**	27.3	.410	.379	.814	2.3	5.9	.9	.3	8.0	12.1
2015–16	Panathinaikos	26	1	21.2	.459	.376	.827	2.3	4.2	.8	.2	7.2	10.3
Career EL		278	228	28.7	.442	.375	.795	3.5	4.5	1.6	.4	9.0	13.7
Career SL/EL		291	228	28.0	.440	.373	.794	3.4	4.4	1.6	.4	8.7	13.2

=== International statistics ===
Denotes years in which Diamantidis won a Gold medal (first place)
Denotes years in which Diamantidis won a Silver medal (second place)

Led the competition

Year	Tournament	National Team	GP	GS	MPG	FG%	3P%	FT%	RPG	APG	SPG	BPG	PPG
2000	Europe Under-20	Greece Under-20	8	N/A	23.5	.444	.200	.333	3.4	1.3	2.5	.0	3.0
Career			8	N/A	23.5	.444	.200	.333	3.4	1.3	2.5	.0	3.0

Year	Tournament	National Team	GP	GS	MPG	FG%	3P%	FT%	RPG	APG	SPG	BPG	PPG
2001	Mediterranean Games	Greece Men	4	–	–	–	–	–	–	–	–	–	1.5
2003	EuroBasket qualifiers	Greece Men	4	N/A	17.2	.571	.500	.000	3.2	1.8	0.5	0.5	2.2
2003	EuroBasket	Greece Men	6	N/A	16.0	.214	.200	.636	2.2	2.3	0.5	0.0	2.5
2004	Summer Olympics	Greece Men	6	N/A	18.7	.381	.200	.692	3.8	2.5	0.8	0.5	4.5
2005	EuroBasket	Greece Men	7	7	31.4	.303	.214	.682	**5.1**	**5.0**	2.8	0.0	5.4
2006	Stanković World Cup	Greece Men	3	N/A	22.3	**.750**	.500	.000	2.7	3.0	3.0	0.0	4.7
2006	World Cup	Greece Men	**9**	N/A	29.9	.511	.440	.708	3.9	2.9	**3.3**	0.6	8.4
2007	EuroBasket	Greece Men	**9**	**9**	**32.8**	.362	.350	**.923**	5.0	2.1	1.3	**1.0**	8.9
2008	World OQT	Greece Men	4	N/A	26.8	.654	**.600**	.500	4.2	3.8	0.8	0.0	**11.0**
2008	Summer Olympics	Greece Men	6	N/A	28.3	.421	.368	.833	3.5	2.3	1.3	0.3	7.3
2010	World Cup	Greece Men	6	6	29.2	.465	.353	.667	3.5	3.8	1.5	0.5	10.0
Career			64	N/A	26.3	.437	.364	.723	3.9	3.0	1.7	0.4	6.8

== Awards and honors ==
=== Club career ===
- 3× EuroLeague Champion: 2007, 2009, 2011
- 9× Greek League Champion: 2005, 2006, 2007, 2008, 2009, 2010, 2011, 2013, 2014
- 10× Greek Cup Winner: 2005, 2006, 2007, 2008, 2009, 2012, 2013, 2014, 2015, 2016
- 2× Triple Crown Winner: 2007, 2009

=== Greek senior national team ===
- 2001 Mediterranean Games: Silver
- 2005 EuroBasket: Gold
- 2006 FIBA Stanković World Cup: Gold
- 2006 FIBA World Championship: Silver
- 7× Acropolis Tournament Champion: 2002, 2003, 2005, 2006, 2007, 2008, 2010

=== Individual awards ===
==== Pro clubs ====
- EuroLeague MVP: 2011
- 2× EuroLeague Final Four MVP: 2007, 2011
- 6× EuroLeague Best Defender: 2005, 2006, 2007, 2008, 2009, 2011
- 4× All-EuroLeague First Team: 2007, 2011, 2012, 2013
- 2× EuroLeague MVP of the Month: December 2010, March/April 2012
- 5× EuroLeague MVP of the Round: 2008 (Top 16 Week 3), 2010 (regular-season Week 3), 2012 (2× - Playoff Games 1 and 5), 2014 (Top 16 Week 3)
- EuroLeague 2000–2010 All-Decade Team: 2010
- EuroLeague 2010–20 All-Decade Team: 2020
- EuroLeague Legend: 2016
- 2× EuroLeague Assists Leader: 2011, 2014
- 2× Eurobasket.com's All-EuroLeague Defensive Team: 2008, 2011
- 6× Greek League MVP: 2004, 2006, 2007, 2008, 2011, 2014
- 4× Greek League Finals MVP: 2006, 2007, 2011, 2014
- Greek League Defensive Player of the Year: 2011
- 11× All-Greek League Team: 2004, 2005, 2006, 2007, 2008, 2010, 2011, 2012, 2013, 2014, 2016
- 12× Greek League All-Star: 2002, 2003, 2004, 2005, 2006, 2007, 2008, 2009, 2010, 2011, 2013, 2014
- Greek League Assists Leader: 2007
- 6× Led Greek League in steals: 2003, 2004, 2005, 2006, 2007, 2008
- 8× All-Greek League Defensive Team (2009–2016)
- 2× Greek Cup Finals MVP: 2009, 2016
- 2× Greek Cup Finals Top Scorer: 2009, 2013
- Greek League Most Popular Player: 2016
- Greek Male Athlete of the Year: 2007
- EuroBasket assists leader: 2005
- EuroBasket All-Tournament Team: 2005
- Superbasket Magazine's Mister Europa Player of the Year: 2007
- Eurobasket.com's All-Europe Player of the Year: 2007
- 6× Eurobasket.com's All-Greek League Player of the Year: 2004, 2006, 2007, 2011, 2013, 2014
- 10× Eurobasket.com's All-Greek League Domestic Players Team: 2005, 2006–2008, 2010–2016
- 12× Eurobasket.com's All-Greek League Defensive Team: 2004, 2005, 2007–2011–2016
- EuroLeague career steals leader since the 2000–01 season
- Professional Greek Basket League career steals leader
- No. 13 retired by Panathinaikos: 2016
- 101 Greats of European Basketball: 2018
- Greek League Hall of Fame: 2022

==== Greek senior national team ====
- EuroBasket All-Tournament Team: 2005
- EuroBasket Assists Leader: 2005
- FIBA World Cup Steals Leader: 2006
- 2× Acropolis Tournament MVP: 2005, 2006
- FIBA EuroStar: 2007
- Voted one of the Greece men's national basketball team's Best 5 Players of the FIBA EuroBasket's 2000–2020 era: 2020
- EuroBasket 2000–2020 Dream Team: 2020
