= Greek Basketball League career statistical leaders =

Greek Basketball League career statistical leaders are the all-time stats leaders of the top-tier level Greek Basketball League (GBL), since the 1992–93 season, when the league first became recognized by FIBA, as a fully and entirely 100% professional league of basketball. Although the Greek Basket League officially recognizes results and championships from the earlier formats of the league, it only officially recognizes stats since the league's professional era began, with the 1992–93 season. The competition's stats from years prior, when the league was officially classified as amateur, are not officially recognized.

== HEBA professional era all-time cumulative stats leaders (since the 1992–93 season) ==
The following are the all-time stats leaders of the Greek Basketball League (GBL), since it became fully professional, starting with the 1992–93 season.

- This counts only the stats since HEBA took over the competition, starting with the 1992–93 season.
- Counting only games played in the A1 Division, and not counting any games played in the Greek 2nd Division, the Greek Cup, or the Greek Supercup:
- 1992–93 to 2009–10: HEBA A1
- 2010–11 to 2023–24: Greek Basket League
- 2024–25 to present: Greek Basket League (GBL)
- *Currently Active Players in the Greek Basketball League:
- Last update: (through 2023–24 season)

=== Games Played ===
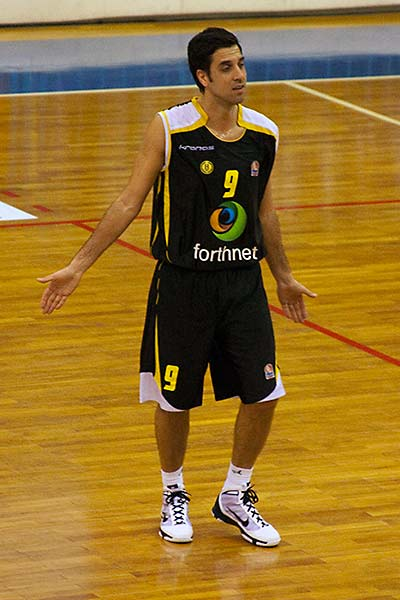
Nikos Chatzis, played in the most games in Greek Basketball League history.

Rank	Player	Games played
1.	(Greece) Nikos Chatzis	554
2.	(Greece) Dimitris Diamantidis	525
3.	(Greece) Nikos Boudouris	510
4.	(Greece) Vassilis Xanthopoulos	505
5.	(Greece) Vassilis Spanoulis	499
6.	(Greece) Georgios Kalaitzis	492
7.	(Greece) Fragiskos Alvertis	489
8.	(Greece) Dimitris Papanikolaou	466
9.	(Greece) Kostas Tsartsaris	462
10.	(Greece) Manolis Papamakarios	452

=== Points Scored ===
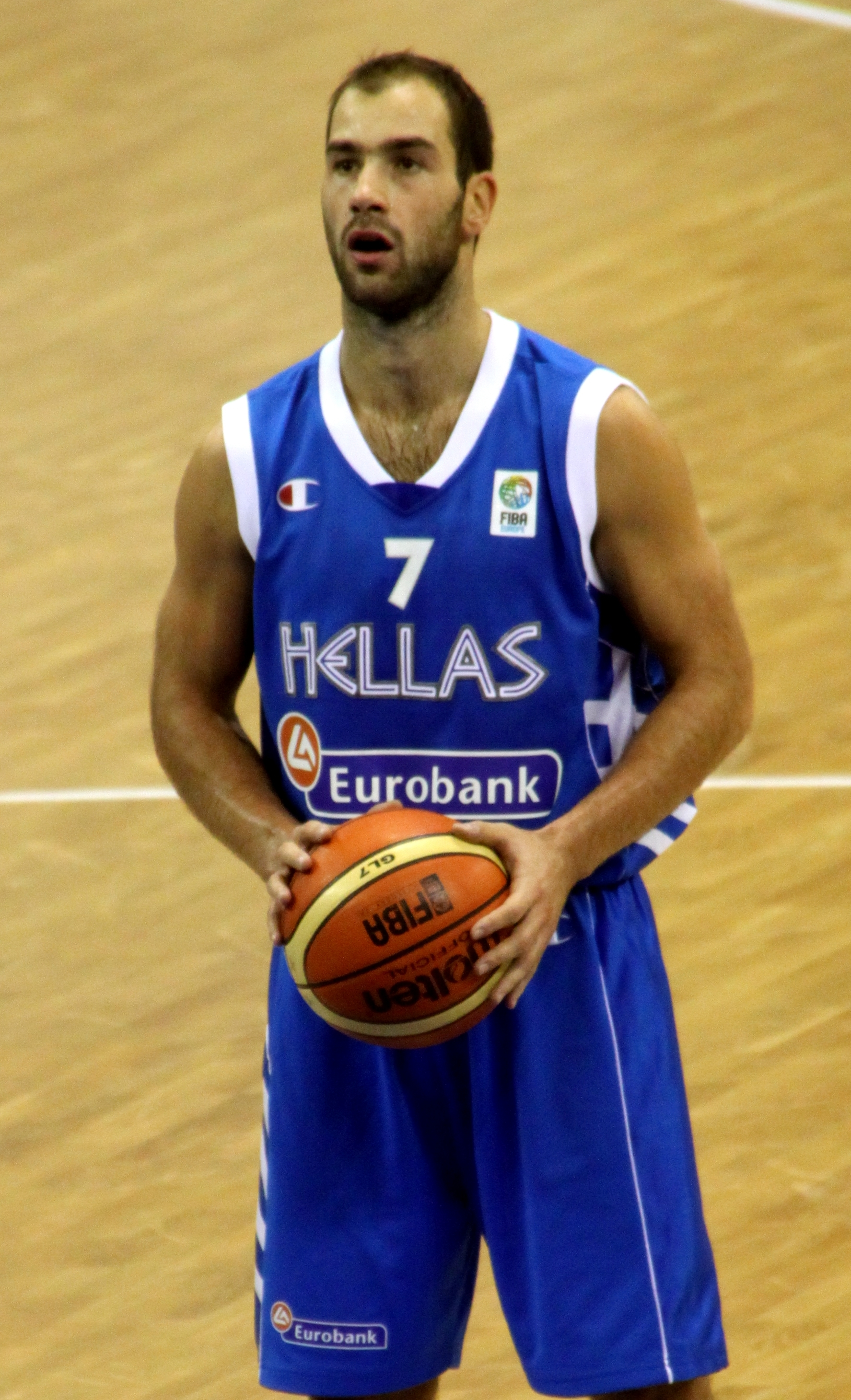
Vassilis Spanoulis, the leading scorer in Greek Basketball League history.

Rank	Player	Points Scored
1.	(Greece) Vassilis Spanoulis	5,517
2.	(Greece) Nikos Chatzis	5,200
3.	(Greece) Angelos Koronios	5,170
4.	(Greece) Panagiotis Liadelis	4,806
5.	(Greece) Fragiskos Alvertis	4,574
6.	(Greece) Dimitris Diamantidis	4,549
7.	(Greece) Nikos Chatzivrettas	4,044
8.	(Greece) Kostas Charalampidis	3,950
9.	(Greece) Giorgos Diamantopoulos	3,946
10.	(Greece) Giorgos Printezis	3,679

=== Total Rebounds ===
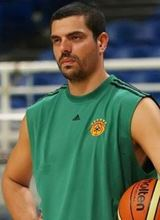
Kostas Tsartsaris, the leading rebounder in Greek Basketball League history.

Rank	Player	Total Rebounds
1.	(Greece) Kostas Tsartsaris	2,173
2.	(Greece) Dimitris Diamantidis	1,948
3.	(Greece) Georgios Karagkoutis	1,877
4.	(Croatia) Stojko Vranković	1,851
5.	(Greece) Ioannis Bourousis	1,803
6.	(United States) Walter Berry	1,722
7.	(Greece) Lazaros Papadopoulos	1,695
8.	(Federal Republic of Yugoslavia) / (Greece) Dragan Tarlać	1,665
9.	(United States) Tony Costner	1,626
10.	(Greece) Panagiotis Fasoulas	1,601

=== Assists ===
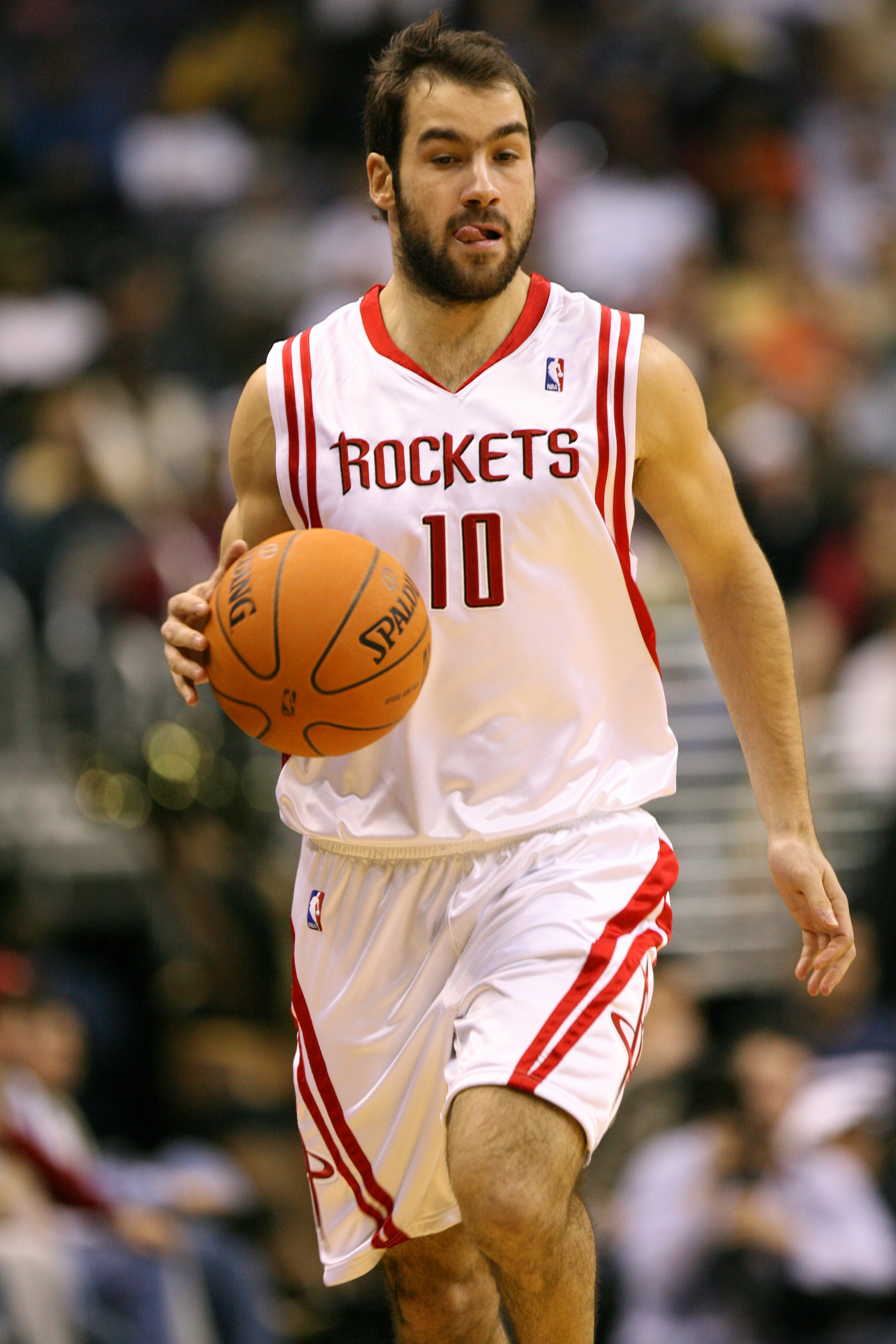
Vassilis Spanoulis, the career assists leader in Greek Basketball League history.

Rank	Player	Assists
1.	(Greece) Vassilis Spanoulis	2,180
2.	(Greece) Dimitris Diamantidis	2,144
3.	(Greece) Vassilis Xanthopoulos	1,607
4.	(Greece) / (United States) Nick Calathes	1,285
5.	(Greece) Nikos Vetoulas	1,093
6.	(Greece) Angelos Koronios	975
7.	(Greece) Kostas Sloukas*	936
8.	(Greece) Georgios Sigalas	933
9.	(Greece) Nikos Boudouris	933
10.	(Greece) Nikos Chatzis	928

=== Steals ===
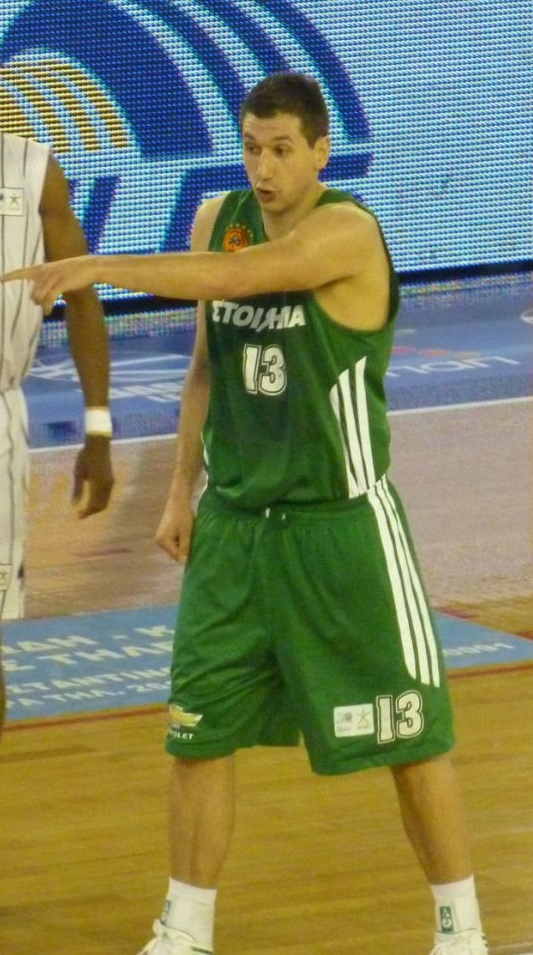
Dimitris Diamantidis, the career steals leader in Greek Basketball League history.

Rank	Player	Steals
1.	(Greece) Dimitris Diamantidis	785
2.	(Greece) Vassilis Xanthopoulos	594
3.	(Greece) Manos Papamakarios	520
4.	(Greece) Georgios Sigalas	472
5.	(Greece) Nikos Vetoulas	470
6.	(Greece) Nikos Boudouris	453
7.	(Greece) Vassilis Spanoulis	436
8.	(Greece) Michalis Pelekanos	428
9.	(Greece) Nikos Chatzis	415
10.	(Greece) Angelos Koronios	412

=== Blocks ===
Rank	Player	Blocks
1.	(Greece) Panagiotis Fasoulas	465
2.	(Croatia) Stojko Vranković	456
3.	(Federal Republic of Yugoslavia) / (Greece) Dragan Tarlać	256
4.	(United States) Walter Berry	231
5.	(Greece) Dimitris Diamantidis	228
6.	(Greece) Kostas Tsartsaris	224
7.	(Greece) Ioannis Bourousis	221
8.	(Russia) / (Greece) Anatoly Zourpenko	208
9.	(United States) Tony Costner	193
10.	(Greece) Kostas Charissis	187

=== 3 pointers made ===
Rank	Player	3 Pointers Made
1.	(Greece) Angelos Koronios	636
2.	(Greece) Vassilis Spanoulis	634
3.	(Greece) Dimitris Diamantidis	624
4.	(Greece) Nikos Chatzis	616
5.	(Greece) Fragiskos Alvertis	590
6.	(Greece) Makis Nikolaidis	588
7.	(Greece) Manos Papamakarios	523
8.	(Federal Republic of Yugoslavia) / (Greece) Milan Tomić	501
9.	(Greece) Nikos Boudouris	454
10.	(Greece) Kostas Charalampidis	447

== Best Tendex performances ==
Rank	Player	Best Tendex Performances
1.	(Greece) Dimitris Mavroeidis	1.991 (May 29, 2010)
2.	(United States) Roy Tarpley	1.941 (October 21, 1992)
3.	(Ukraine) Sasha Volkov	1.921 (November 19, 1994)
4.	(Germany) Misan Haldin	1.903 (November 2, 2002)

== See also ==
- Greek Basketball League regular season statistical leaders
