= 2010–11 Euroleague =

EuroLeague season

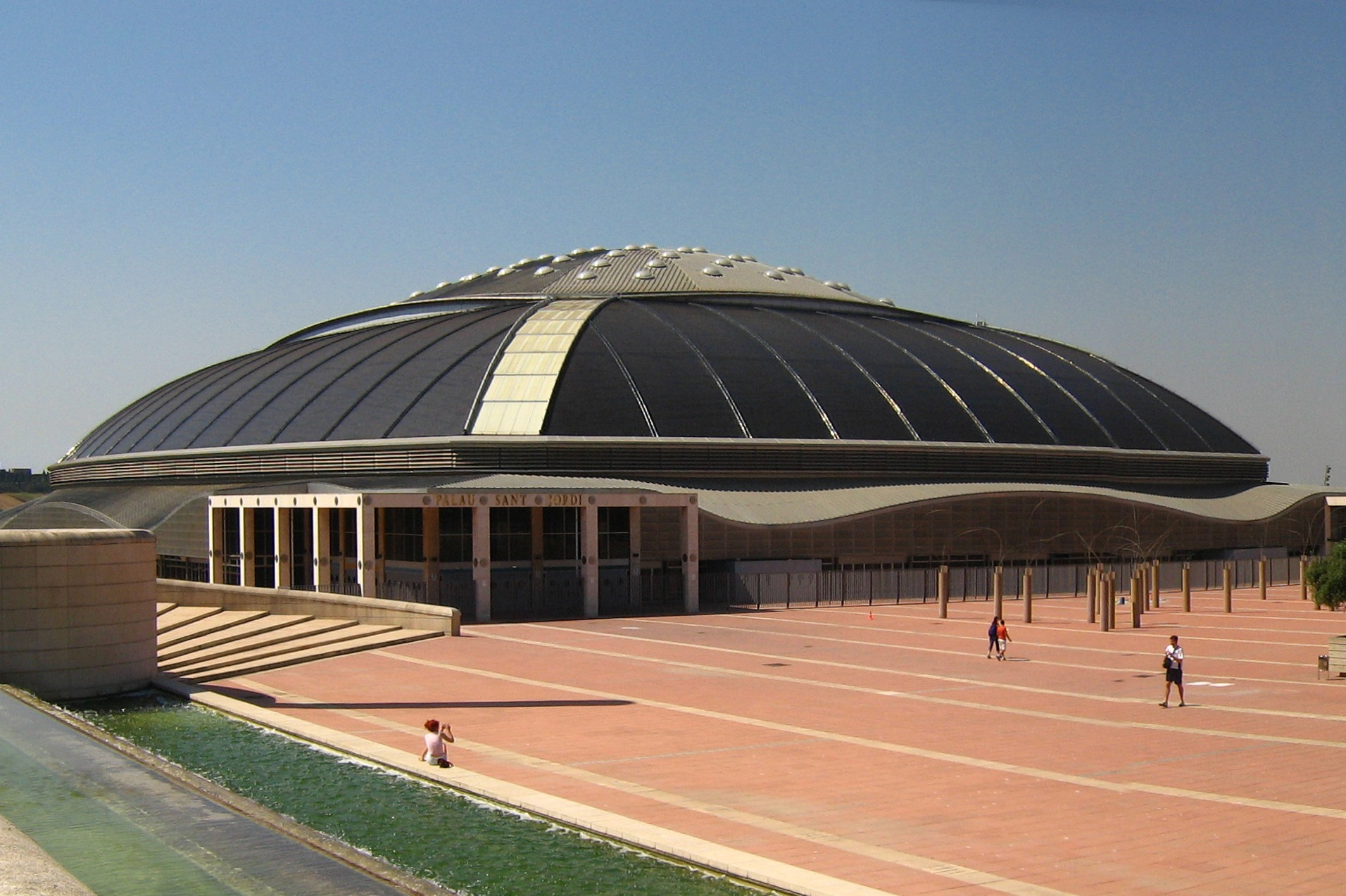
- The Palau Sant Jordi in Barcelona hosted the Final Four
- Season: 2010–11
- Duration: 18 October 2010 – 8 May 2011
- Teams: 24

Regular season
- Season MVP: (Greece) Dimitris Diamantidis

Finals
- Champions: (Greece) Panathinaikos (6th title)
- Runners-up: (Israel) Maccabi Electra
- Third place: (Italy) Montepaschi Siena
- Fourth place: (Spain) Real Madrid
- Final Four MVP: (Greece) Dimitris Diamantidis

Statistical leaders
Points	(Serbia) Igor Rakočević	17.2
Rebounds	(Turkey) Mirsad Türkcan	7.3
Assists	(Greece) Dimitris Diamantidis	6.2
Index Rating	(Spain) Fernando San Emeterio	19.1

The 2010–11 Turkish Airlines Euroleague was the 11th season of the modern era of professional Euroleague Basketball, and the first under the title sponsorship of Turkish Airlines. Including the competition's previous incarnation as the FIBA Europe Champions Cup, this was the 54th season of the premier first-tier competition for European men's clubs.

The format featured 24 teams, beginning with Game 1 of the first qualifying round on September 21, 2010, and culminating at the Final Four in the Palau Sant Jordi, Barcelona. It was won by the Athenian club Panathinaikos (6th title), who defeated Maccabi Electra in the championship game of May 8, 2011. Montepaschi Siena, finished 3rd by holding off Real Madrid in the third-place game.

At the individual level, the season was marked by Dimitris Diamantidis of Panathinaikos. Not only did the Greek point guard lift the trophy for the third time in five years and receive the Euroleague Final Four MVP award, but he also became the first player ever to win three end-of-season awards: Euroleague MVP, Euroleague Best Defender, and All-Euroleague First Team.

== Teams ==
- A - licensed clubs: teams with 3-year licence
- Associated clubs: teams with B and C temporary licenses
- 1st, 2nd, etc.: League position after Playoffs
- EC: Champion of the 2009–10 Eurocup Basketball
- WC: Wild card
- Bold: Qualification rounds winners

Regular season
**A-license**
(Spain) Caja Laboral (1st)	(Greece) Panathinaikos (1st)	(Turkey) Fenerbahçe Ülker (1st)	(Poland) Asseco Prokom Gdynia (1st)
(Spain) FC Barcelona (2nd)^{TH}	(Greece) Olympiacos (2nd)	(Turkey) Efes Pilsen (2nd)	(Russia) CSKA Moscow (1st)
(Spain) Real Madrid (3rd)	(Italy) Montepaschi Siena (1st)	(Israel) Maccabi Electra (2nd)	(Slovenia) Union Olimpija (2nd)
(Spain) Unicaja (4th)	(Italy) Lottomatica Roma (6th)	(Lithuania) Žalgiris (2nd)	
**Associated clubs**
(Spain) Power Electronics Valencia (5th)^{EC}	(Italy) Armani Jeans Milano (2nd)	(Lithuania) Lietuvos rytas (1st)	(Croatia) Cibona (1st)
(France) Cholet (1st)	(Germany) Brose Bamberg (1st)	(Serbia) Partizan (1st)	
Qualifying rounds
(France) Le Mans (2nd)	(Greece) ~~Maroussi~~ (3rd)	(Turkey) Banvit (3rd)	(Russia) **Khimki** (2nd)
(France) Roanne (3rd)	(Italy) Pepsi Caserta (3rd)	(Israel) Hapoel Gilboa (1st)	(Russia) UNICS (3rd)
(France) ASVEL (9th)^{WC}	(Germany) Alba Berlin (2nd)	(Serbia) Hemofarm Vršac (2nd)	(Netherlands) GasTerra Flames (1st)
(Belgium) **Spirou Charleroi** (1st)	(Czech Republic) ČEZ Nymburk (1st)	(Montenegro) Budućnost (1st)	(Ukraine) Budivelnyk (2nd)^{WC}

Key to colors
Champion
Runner-up
Third place
Fourth place
Eliminated in Quarterfinals
Eliminated in Last 16
Eliminated in the regular season

Country (League)	No.teams	Teams
Spain (ACB)	5	Caja Laboral	FC Barcelona	Real Madrid	Unicaja Málaga	Power Electronics Valencia
Italy (Lega A)	3	Montepaschi Siena	Armani Jeans Milano	Lottomatica Roma
Greece (GBL)	2	Panathinaikos	Olympiacos
Turkey (TBL)	2	Fenerbahçe Ülker	Efes Pilsen
Lithuania (LKL)	2	Lietuvos Rytas	Žalgiris
Russia (PBL)	2	CSKA Moscow	Khimki
Serbia (KLS)	1	Partizan
France (LNB Pro A)	1	Cholet
Germany (BBL)	1	Brose Bamberg
Croatia (A1 Liga)	1	Cibona
Slovenia (SKL)	1	Union Olimpija
Israel (BSL)	1	Maccabi Electra
Poland (PLK)	1	Asseco Prokom
Belgium (BLB)	1	Spirou Charleroi

== Draw ==
The draws for the 2010–11 Turkish Airlines Euroleague was held on Thursday, July 8 at Barcelona, Spain. The draws began at 11:15 local time (CET) and determined the qualifying-round matchups and regular-season groups for the Euroleague, as well as the qualifying rounds for the Eurocup and the regular-season for the EuroChallenge.

Teams were organised into six pots of four teams.

Two teams from the same country cannot coincide in the same Regular Season group, except for Spain that has five teams participating in the competition.

Pot 1	Pot 2	Pot 3	Pot 4	Pot 5	Pot 6
(Russia) CSKA Moscow (Spain) FC Barcelona (Greece) Olympiacos (Spain) Caja Laboral	(Italy) Montepaschi Siena (Greece) Panathinaikos (Israel) Maccabi Electra (Spain) Real Madrid	(Serbia) Partizan (Spain) Power Electronics Valencia (Spain) Unicaja Málaga (Lithuania) Lietuvos Rytas	(Turkey) Fenerbahçe Ülker (Poland) Asseco Prokom (Turkey) Efes Pilsen (Italy) Lottomatica Roma	(Lithuania) Žalgiris (Croatia) Cibona (Italy) Armani Jeans Milano (Germany) Brose Bamberg	(Slovenia) Union Olimpija (France) Cholet (Belgium) Spirou Charleroi (QR A) (Russia) Khimki (QR B)

== Qualifying rounds ==
The Qualifying Rounds consisted of three rounds, QR1, QR2 and QR3. The rounds were played in home and away series.

=== Bracket ===
The higher ranked team hosted the second leg.

First qualifying round
1	(Germany) Alba Berlin	79	95	174
4	(France) Roanne	86	82	168
2	(Serbia) Hemofarm Vršac	97	77	174
3	(Israel) Hapoel Gilboa	84	86	170
1	(Russia) UNICS	84	78	162
4	(Netherlands) GasTerra Flames	72	63	135
2	(Czech Republic) ČEZ Nymburk	68	73	141
3	(Belgium) Spirou Charleroi	79	71	150

Second qualifying round
1	(Germany) Alba Berlin	73	73	146
2	(Serbia) Hemofarm Vršac	67	78	145
1	(Russia) UNICS	69	75	144
3	(Belgium) Spirou Charleroi	75	71	146

Third qualifying round
1	(Germany) Alba Berlin	77	70	147
3	(Belgium) Spirou Charleroi	81	70	151

First qualifying round
1	(France) ASVEL	64	84	148
4	(Montenegro) Budućnost	69	76	145
2	(France) Le Mans	78	78	156
3	(Turkey) Banvit	72	66	138
1	(Russia) Khimki	77	85	162
4	(Italy) Pepsi Caserta	74	66	140
2	(Ukraine) Budivelnyk	w/o
3	(Greece) Maroussi	DSQ

Second qualifying round
1	(France) ASVEL	75	71	146
2	(France) Le Mans	85	63	148
1	(Russia) Khimki	87	74	161
2	(Ukraine) Budivelnyk	58	67	125

Third qualifying round
2	(France) Le Mans	56	66	122
1	(Russia) Khimki	70	87	157

== Regular season ==
The Regular Season began on 18 October 2010 with Olympiacos hosting Real Madrid and ended on 23 December 2010.

If teams were level on record at the end of the Regular Season, tiebreakers are applied in the following order:

1. Head-to-head record.
2. Head-to-head point differential.
3. Point differential during the Regular Season.
4. Points scored during the regular season.
5. Sum of quotients of points scored and points allowed in each Regular Season match.

Key to colors
Top four places in each group advanced to Top 16

=== Group A ===
	Team	Pld	W	L	PF	PA	Diff
1.	(Israel) Maccabi Electra	10	9	1	799	700	+99
2.	(Spain) Caja Laboral	10	5	5	809	784	+25
3.	(Lithuania) Žalgiris	10	5	5	762	765	−3
4.	(Serbia) Partizan	10	5	5	658	717	−59
5.	(Russia) Khimki	10	4	6	764	753	+11
6.	(Poland) Asseco Prokom	10	2	8	689	762	−73

=== Group B ===
	Team	Pld	W	L	PF	PA	Diff
1.	(Greece) Olympiacos	10	7	3	805	730	+75
2.	(Spain) Real Madrid	10	6	4	734	662	+72
3.	(Spain) Unicaja Málaga	10	5	5	749	759	−10
4.	(Italy) Lottomatica Roma	10	5	5	733	770	−37
5.	(Germany) Brose Bamberg	10	4	6	714	739	−25
6.	(Belgium) Spirou Charleroi	10	3	7	691	766	−75

=== Group C ===
	Team	Pld	W	L	PF	PA	Diff
1.	(Italy) Montepaschi Siena	10	8	2	787	661	+126
2.	(Turkey) Fenerbahçe Ülker	10	7	3	795	723	+72
3.	(Spain) Regal FC Barcelona	10	7	3	766	709	+57
4.	(Lithuania) Lietuvos Rytas	10	4	6	779	784	−5
5.	(France) Cholet	10	4	6	705	774	−69
6.	(Croatia) Cibona	10	0	10	677	858	−181

=== Group D ===
	Team	Pld	W	L	PF	PA	Diff
1.	(Greece) Panathinaikos	10	7	3	802	703	+99
2.	(Slovenia) Union Olimpija	10	6	4	789	783	+6
3.	(Turkey) Efes Pilsen	10	5	5	756	768	−12
4.	(Spain) Power Electronics Valencia	10	5	5	689	695	−6
5.	(Italy) Armani Jeans Milano	10	4	6	737	766	−29
6.	(Russia) CSKA Moscow	10	3	7	683	741	−58

== Top 16 ==
The 16 qualified teams were drawn into four groups with four teams. The matches were played between January 19 and March 3, the top two teams of every group advanced to the playoffs. The draw took place on 4 January 2011 at Barcelona at 13:00 CET, and was streamed live on the Euroleague's official website.

Key to colors
Top two places in each group advanced to quarterfinals

=== Group E ===
	Team	Pld	W	L	PF	PA	Diff
1.	(Spain) Caja Laboral	6	4	2	468	437	+31
2.	(Greece) Panathinaikos	6	4	2	452	395	+57
3.	(Lithuania) Lietuvos Rytas	6	3	3	445	473	−28
4.	(Spain) Unicaja Málaga	6	1	5	414	474	−60

=== Group F ===
	Team	Pld	W	L	PF	PA	Diff
1.	(Spain) Regal FC Barcelona	6	6	0	471	402	+69
2.	(Israel) Maccabi Electra	6	3	3	511	442	+69
3.	(Italy) Lottomatica Roma	6	2	4	411	462	−51
4.	(Slovenia) Union Olimpija	6	1	5	394	481	−87

=== Group G ===
	Team	Pld	W	L	PF	PA	Diff
1.	(Spain) Real Madrid	6	5	1	460	423	+37
2.	(Italy) Montepaschi Siena	6	4	2	452	423	+29
3.	(Turkey) Efes Pilsen	6	2	4	426	455	−29
4.	(Serbia) Partizan	6	1	5	389	426	−37

=== Group H ===
	Team	Pld	W	L	PF	PA	Diff
1.	(Greece) Olympiacos	6	5	1	461	418	+43
2.	(Spain) Power Electronics Valencia	6	3	3	449	438	+11
3.	(Turkey) Fenerbahçe Ülker	6	3	3	456	462	−6
4.	(Lithuania) Žalgiris	6	1	5	418	466	−48

== Quarterfinals ==
Team 1 hosted Games 1 and 2, plus Game 5 if necessary. Team 2 hosted Game 3, and Game 4 if necessary.

Team 1	Agg.	Team 2	1st leg	2nd leg	3rd leg	4th leg	5th leg
Caja Laboral (Spain)	1–3	(Israel) Maccabi Electra	76–70	81–83	60–81	77–99	
Regal FC Barcelona (Spain)	1–3	(Greece) Panathinaikos	83–82	71–75	74–76	67–78	
Real Madrid (Spain)	3–2	(Spain) Power Electronics Valencia	71–65	75–81	75–66	72–81	66–58
Olympiacos (Greece)	1–3	(Italy) Montepaschi Siena	89–41	65–82	72–81	76–88	

== Final four ==
Semifinals; May 6
(Greece) Panathinaikos	77
(Italy) Montepaschi Siena	69
(Israel) Maccabi Tel Aviv	82
(Spain) Real Madrid	63

Final; May 8
(Greece) Panathinaikos	78
(Israel) Maccabi Tel Aviv	70
Third place
(Spain) Real Madrid	62
(Italy) Montepaschi Siena	80

== Individual statistics ==
=== Rating ===
Rank	Name	Team	Games	Rating	PIR
1.	(Spain) Fernando San Emeterio	(Spain) Caja Laboral	20	381	19.05
2.	(Greece) Dimitris Diamantidis	(Greece) Panathinaikos	22	407	18.50
3.	(United Kingdom) Joel Freeland	(Spain) Unicaja Málaga	15	262	17.47

=== Points ===
Rank	Name	Team	Games	Points	PPG
1.	(Serbia) Igor Rakočević	(Turkey) Efes Pilsen	14	241	17.21
2.	(Bosnia and Herzegovina) Mirza Teletović	(Spain) Caja Laboral	20	309	15.45
3.	(Greece) Vassilis Spanoulis	(Greece) Olympiacos	20	284	14.20

=== Rebounds ===
Rank	Name	Team	Games	Rebounds	RPG
1.	(Turkey) Mirsad Türkcan	(Turkey) Fenerbahçe Ülker	12	88	7.33
2.	(United States) James Gist	(Serbia) Partizan	14	97	6.93
3.	(Lithuania) Paulius Jankūnas	(Lithuania) Žalgiris	16	110	6.88

=== Assists ===
Rank	Name	Team	Games	Assists	APG
1.	(Greece) Dimitris Diamantidis	(Greece) Panathinaikos	22	137	6.23
2.	(Brazil) Marcelinho Huertas	(Spain) Caja Laboral	20	111	5.55
3.	(Montenegro) Omar Cook	(Spain) Power Electronics Valencia	21	116	5.52

=== Other Stats ===
Category	Name	Team	Games	Stat
Steals per game	(United States) Chuck Eidson	(Israel) Maccabi Electra	22	2.64
Blocks per game	(Slovenia) Mirza Begic	(Lithuania) Žalgiris (Spain) Real Madrid	16	1.50
Turnovers per game	(Greece) Vassilis Spanoulis	(Greece) Olympiacos	20	3.85
Fouls drawn per game	(Greece) Vassilis Spanoulis	(Greece) Olympiacos	20	5.40
Minutes per game	(North Macedonia) Vlado Ilievski	(Slovenia) Union Olimpija	15	34:48
2FG%	(Greece) Antonis Fotsis	(Greece) Panathinaikos	22	0.760
3FG%	(Spain) Fernando San Emeterio	(Spain) Caja Laboral	20	0.500
FT%	(France) Nando de Colo	(Spain) Power Electronics Valencia	19	0.957

=== Game highs ===
Category	Name	Team	Stat
Rating	(United States) Keith Langford	(Russia) Khimki	42
Points	(United States) Keith Langford	(Russia) Khimki	35
Rebounds	(North Macedonia) Richard Hendrix	(Israel) Maccabi Electra	16
Assists	(Serbia) Vule Avdalovic	(France) Cholet	13
Assists	(Brazil) Marcelinho Huertas	(Spain) Caja Laboral	13
Steals	(United States) Doron Perkins	(Israel) Maccabi Electra	7
Steals	(United States) Charles Smith	(Italy) Lottomatica Roma	7
Blocks	(Israel) D'or Fischer	(Spain) Real Madrid	6
Turnovers	(United States) DeJuan Collins	(Lithuania) Žalgiris	9
Fouls Drawn	(United States) Keith Langford	(Russia) Khimki	15

== Awards ==
=== Euroleague 2010–11 MVP ===
- (Greece) Dimitris Diamantidis ( (Greece) Panathinaikos)

=== Euroleague 2010–11 Final Four MVP ===
- (Greece) Dimitris Diamantidis ( (Greece) Panathinaikos)

=== All-Euroleague Team 2010–11 ===
Position	All-Euroleague First Team	Club team	All-Euroleague Second Team	Club team
PG	(Greece) Dimitris Diamantidis	(Greece) Panathinaikos	(United States) Jeremy Pargo	(Israel) Maccabi Electra
SG/SF	(Spain) Juan Carlos Navarro	(Spain) FC Barcelona	(Greece) Vassilis Spanoulis	(Greece) Olympiacos
SG/SF	(Spain) Fernando San Emeterio	(Spain) Caja Laboral	(Spain) Sergio Llull	(Spain) Real Madrid
PF/C	(United States) Mike Batiste	(Greece) Panathinaikos	(Serbia) Duško Savanović	(Spain) Power Electronics Valencia
PF/C	(Greece) Sofoklis Schortsanitis	(Israel) Maccabi Electra	(Lithuania) Kšyštof Lavrinovič	(Italy) Montepaschi Siena

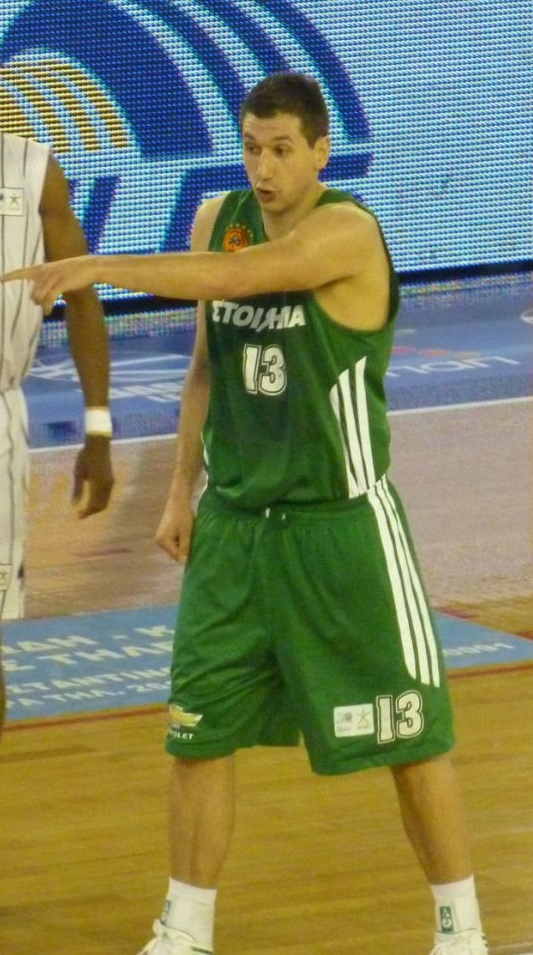
Dimitris Diamantidis, Euroleague MVP and final four MVP for 2011

=== Top scorer (Alphonso Ford Trophy) ===
- (Serbia) Igor Rakočević ( (Turkey) Efes Pilsen)

=== Best Defender ===
- (Greece) Dimitris Diamantidis ( (Greece) Panathinaikos)

=== Rising Star ===
- (Spain) Nikola Mirotić ( (Spain) Real Madrid)

=== Coach of the Year (Alexander Gomelsky Award) ===
- (Serbia) Željko Obradović ( (Greece) Panathinaikos)

=== Club Executive of the Year ===
- (Greece) Pavlos Giannakopoulos and Thanasis Giannakopoulos ( (Greece) Panathinaikos)

=== MVP Weekly ===
==== Regular season ====
Game	Player	Team	Rating
1	(United States) Chuck Eidson	(Israel) Maccabi Electra	30
2	(United States) Bootsy Thornton	(Turkey) Efes Pilsen	29
3	(Greece) Dimitris Diamantidis	(Greece) Panathinaikos	31
4	(Spain) Berni Rodríguez	(Spain) Unicaja Málaga	36
5	(Dominican Republic) Sammy Mejia	(France) Cholet	35
6	(Lithuania) Kšyštof Lavrinovič	(Italy) Montepaschi Siena	36
7	(North Macedonia) Darius Washington	(Italy) Lottomatica Roma	31
8	(Bosnia and Herzegovina) Ratko Varda	(Poland) Asseco Prokom	31
9	(North Macedonia) Bo McCalebb	(Italy) Montepaschi Siena	34
10	(United States) Keith Langford	(Russia) Khimki	42

==== Top 16 ====
Game	Player	Team	Rating
1	(United States) Kenny Gregory	(Slovenia) Union Olimpija	30
2	(Brazil) Marcelinho Huertas (United States) Khalid El-Amin	(Spain) Caja Laboral (Lithuania) Lietuvos Rytas	29
3	(Israel) D'or Fischer (Israel) Lior Eliyahu	(Spain) Real Madrid (Israel) Maccabi Electra	30
4	(Greece) Antonis Fotsis	(Greece) Panathinaikos	40
5	(Brazil) Marcelinho Huertas (2)	(Spain) Caja Laboral	30
6	(Spain) Fernando San Emeterio	(Spain) Caja Laboral	37

==== Quarterfinals ====
Game	Player	Team	Rating
1	(North Macedonia) Richard Hendrix	(Israel) Maccabi Electra	28
2	(United States) Malik Hairston	(Italy) Montepaschi Siena	32
3	(Serbia) Marko Jarić (Israel) D'or Fischer (2)	(Italy) Montepaschi Siena (Spain) Real Madrid	27
4	(United States) Malik Hairston (2)	(Italy) Montepaschi Siena	31
5	(Serbia) Duško Savanović	(Spain) Power Electronics Valencia	23

=== MVP of Month ===
Month	Player	Team
October 2010	(Slovenia) Goran Jagodnik	(Slovenia) Union Olimpija
November 2010	(United States) Chuck Eidson	(Israel) Maccabi Electra
December 2010	(Greece) Dimitris Diamantidis	(Greece) Panathinaikos
January 2011	(Spain) Juan Carlos Navarro	(Spain) FC Barcelona
February 2011	(Slovenia) Radoslav Nesterović	(Greece) Olympiacos
March 2011	(United States) Jeremy Pargo	(Israel) Maccabi Electra
