= 2011 Euroleague Final Four =

Basketball tournament

- Season: 2010–11 Euroleague

Tournament details
- Arena: Palau Sant Jordi; Barcelona, Spain
- Dates: May 6 – May 8, 2011

Final positions
- Champions: (Greece) Panathinaikos (6th title)
- Runners-up: (Israel) Maccabi Tel Aviv
- Third place: (Italy) Montepaschi Siena
- Fourth place: (Spain) Real Madrid

Awards and statistics
- MVP: (Greece) Dimitris Diamantidis

The 2011 Euroleague Final Four was the concluding EuroLeague Final Four tournament of the Euroleague 2010–11 season. It was held on May 6–8, 2011. All of the games were held at the Palau Sant Jordi, in Barcelona, Spain. Panathinaikos won its 6th EuroLeague championship. Dimitris Diamantidis was named the Final Four MVP.

== Bracket ==
Semifinals; May 6
(Greece) Panathinaikos	77
(Italy) Montepaschi Siena	69
(Israel) Maccabi Tel Aviv	82
(Spain) Real Madrid	63

Final; May 8
(Greece) Panathinaikos	78
(Israel) Maccabi Tel Aviv	70
Third place
(Spain) Real Madrid	62
(Italy) Montepaschi Siena	80

All times are CEST (UTC+2).

== Semifinal 1 ==
6 May 2011
18:00

Report

Panathinaikos (Greece)	77–69	(Italy) Montepaschi Siena
Scoring by quarter: 17–21, 23–15, 16–11, 21–22
Pts: Calathes 17; Rebs: Batiste 7 Asts: Diamantidis 9		Pts: Kaukėnas 13; Rebs: Stonerook 14; Asts: McCalebb 4

Palau Sant Jordi, Barcelona
Attendance: 15,768
Referees: Juan Carlos Mitjana (ESP), Grzegorz Ziemblicki (POL), Robert Lottermoser (GER)

== Semifinal 2 ==
6 May 2011
21:00

Report

Maccabi Tel Aviv (Israel)	82–63	(Spain) Real Madrid
Scoring by quarter: 14–12, 18–17, 23–18, 27–16
Pts: Eidson 19; Rebs: Eidson 8 Asts: Pargo 7		Pts: Tomić 17; Rebs: Reyes 14; Asts: Prigioni, Suárez 3

Palau Sant Jordi, Barcelona
Attendance: 15,768
Referees: Luigi Lamonica (ITA), Christos Christodoulou (GRE), Zoran Sutulovic (MNE)

== Third-place playoff ==
8 May 2011
13:30

Report

Montepaschi Siena (Italy)	80–62	(Spain) Real Madrid
Scoring by quarter: 19–11, 17–21, 21–13, 23–17
Pts: Lavrinovič 17; Rebs: Raković 11; Asts: Lavrinovič 4		Pts: Llull 23; Rebs: Tomić 7 Asts: Prigioni 5

Palau Sant Jordi, Barcelona
Attendance: 13,000
Referees: Christos Christodoulou (GRE), Matej Boltauzer (SLO), Eddie Viator (FRA)

== Final ==
8 May 2011
16:30

Report

Maccabi Tel Aviv (Israel)	70–78	(Greece) Panathinaikos
Scoring by quarter: 15–22, 15–11, 13–21, 27–24
Pts: Eidson 17; Rebs: Eidson 7 Asts: Pargo 9		Pts: Batiste 18; Rebs: Fotsis, Sato 7 Asts: Diamantidis 9

Palau Sant Jordi, Barcelona
Attendance: 15,768
Referees: Juan Carlos Mitjana (ESP), Luigi Lamonica (ITA), Robert Lottermoser (GER)

Maccabi	Panathinaikos

Starters:			P	R	A
PG	4	(United States) Jeremy Pargo	12	5	9
SG	13	(United States) Chuck Eidson	17	7	1
SF	10	(Israel) Guy Pnini	8	5	1
PF	8	(Israel) Lior Eliyahu	12	5	0
C	21	(Greece) Sofoklis Schortsanitis	4	0	3
Reserves:			P	R	A
PF	5	(United States) Richard Hendrix	0	1	0
PG	6	(Israel) Derrick Sharp (C)	0	0	0
SF	7	(Israel) David Blu	14	2	1
SG	11	(Israel) Tal Burstein	0	0	0
PF	12	(Israel) Sean Labanowski	DNP		
C	14	(Serbia) Milan Mačvan	3	4	1
Head coach:
(Israel) David Blatt

2010–11 Euroleague
Champions

Panathinaikos
6th title

Starters:			P	R	A
PG	13	(Greece) Dimitris Diamantidis (C)	16	5	9
SG	15	(Greece) Nick Calathes	4	0	6
SF	10	(Central African Republic) Romain Sato	13	7	1
PF	9	(Greece) Antonis Fotsis	5	7	1
C	14	(Greece) Ian Vougioukas	4	1	0
Reserves:			P	R	A
PG	5	(Serbia) Milenko Tepić	0	0	0
C	6	(Australia) Aleks Marić	2	3	0
SF	7	(Greece) Stratos Perperoglou	2	4	0
C	8	(United States) Mike Batiste	18	6	1
SG	11	(United States) Drew Nicholas	14	0	1
PF	12	(Greece) Kostas Tsartsaris	0	1	0
PF	18	(Greece) Kostas Kaimakoglou	0	0	0
Head coach:
(Serbia) Željko Obradović
