= Evangelos Koronios =

Greek basketball player and coach

Angelos Koronios Άγγελος Κορωνιός
Personal information
- Born: 16 March 1969 (age 57) Athens, Greece
- Listed height: 6 ft 1.25 in (1.86 m)
- Listed weight: 180 lb (82 kg)

Career information
- NBA draft: 1991: undrafted
- Playing career: 1986–2005
- Position: Point guard / shooting guard
- Number: 5, 8, 10, 14
- Coaching career: 2005–present

Career history

Playing
- 1986–1998: Peristeri
- 1998–2000: AEK Athens
- 2000–2001: PAOK
- 2001–2003: Maroussi
- 2003–2004: Panionios
- 2004–2005: Olympiacos

Coaching
- 2005–2006: Alimos
- 2006–2007: Sporting
- 2007, 2011: AEK Athens
- 2012–2013: Kavala
- 2014–2015: AEK Athens (assistant)

Career highlights
- As a player: FIBA Saporta Cup champion (2000); Greek Cup winner (2000); 5× Greek League All-Star: (1994 I, 1996 I, 1996 II, 1997, 1999); Greek All-Star Game 3 Point Shootout champion (2004); Greek Basket League Hall of Fame (2022); Greek League career stats leaders: Greek League all-time leader in three-pointers made; As a head coach: Greek 2nd Division champion (2007)
Medals
Men's basketball
Representing Greece
Mediterranean Games
Silver medal – second place	1991 Athens	Under-26

Evangelos Koronios, most commonly known as Angelos Koronios (alternate spelling: Aggelos, Greek: Ευάγγελος "Άγγελος" Κορωνιός; born 16 March 1969), is a Greek former professional basketball player and coach.

== Professional career ==
Born in Athens, Greece, Koronios started playing club basketball with the youth clubs of Peristeri Athens, in 1982. He began his pro career with the senior men's team of Peristeri, in 1986. In 1998, he moved to the Greek club AEK Athens, where he played for two seasons. Then, he continued his career with the Greek clubs PAOK Thessaliniki (2000–01), Maroussi Athens, for two seasons (2001–03), Panionios Athens (2003–04), and finally, with Olympiacos Piraeus (2004–05).

At the time of his retirement, Koronios was the unofficial all-time stats leader of the Greek Basket League, since the 1986–87 season in points scored, with 7,080, in assists, with 1,264, in steals, with 583, in free throws made, with 2,020, and in three pointers made, with 828. In total, Koronios appeared in 448 games in the top-tier level league of Greek basketball. Throughout his career, he appeared in 448 Greek Championship games, ranking 13th all-time. With 7,080 points scored, he remains the 6th top scorer in professional Greek League history since the establishment of the A1 National Division in 1993, and holds the top spot for the era spanning from 1986 onwards. He previously held the all-time records for assists and steals, which were surpassed by Dimitris Diamantidis in 2011; however, because assists and steals were not officially recorded prior to 1993, his complete career totals remain unverified. He ranks first in three-pointers made in the A1 era since 1993 with 636, and accumulated over 855 career three-pointers excluding the playoffs. Regarded as one of the premier shooters in the history of Greek basketball, he ranks 1st in assists, 1st in steals, and 6th in total scoring in the league's history.

== National team career ==
Koronios was a member of the senior Greek national basketball team. With Greece's senior national team, he played at the 1992 FIBA European Olympic Qualifying Tournament, at the 1997 FIBA EuroBasket, at the 1998 FIBA World Championship, and at the 1999 FIBA EuroBasket. He also won a silver medal at the 1991 Mediterranean Games.

== Coaching career ==
In the 2005–06 season, Koronios started his coaching career, working as the head coach at Alimos. He spent the next season (2006–07) coaching Sporting, and with them, he won the Greek 2nd Division championship.

In the summer of 2007, he was appointed as the new head coach of AEK Athens, but he decided to resign, "for personal reasons", on 25 October. He was later appointed as the new head coach of AEK, following the departure of Minas Gekos from that position, in January 2011. After that, he was the head coach of Kavala, before returning to AEK Athens, as an assistant coach.

== Awards and accomplishments ==
=== Pro clubs ===
- 5× Greek League All-Star: (1994 I, 1996 I, 1996 II, 1997, 1999)
- Greek Cup Winner: (2000)
- FIBA Saporta Cup Champion: (2000)
- EuroLeague MVP of the Round: (Playoffs - Eighth-finals Game 3; 2000–01)
- Greek All-Star Game 3 Point Shootout Contest Champion: (2004)
- When he retired, he was the all-time leader in games played in the Greek Basketball Championship's Alpha 1 era (since the 1986–87 season).
- When he retired, he was the all-time leader in steals in the Greek Basketball Championship's Alpha 1 era (since the 1986–87 season).
- He is the all-time leader in 3 pointers made in the Greek Basketball Championship's Alpha 1 era (since the 1986–87 season).
- He is the all-time leading scorer of the Greek Basketball Championship's Alpha 1 era (since the 1986–87 season).
- He is the 6th all-time leading scorer of the Greek Basketball Championship's Alpha era (since the 1963–64 season).
- Member of the Greek Basket League Hall of Fame, inducted as a player.

=== Greek national team ===
- 1991 Mediterranean Games: Silver

=== As a head coach ===
- Greek 2nd Division champion (2007)

== See also ==
- Players with the most points scored in the Amateur Greek Basketball Championship (1963–1992)
