= EuroLeague Best Defender =

Annual basketball award of the European premier league

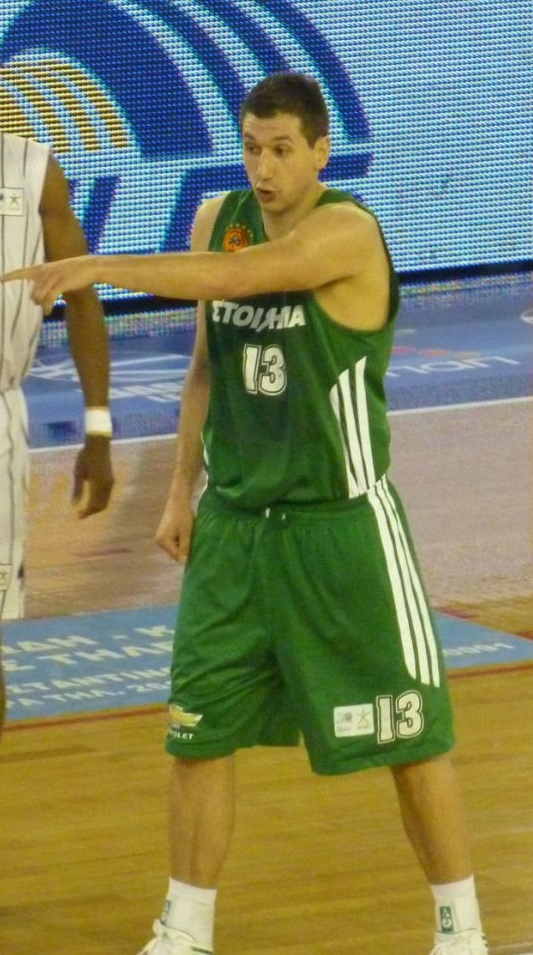
Dimitris Diamantidis was the EuroLeague's Best Defender 6 times (2005, 2006, 2007, 2008, 2009, 2011).

The EuroLeague Best Defender is an annual basketball award of the European premier level EuroLeague. It is awarded to the best defensive player throughout the season, up until the EuroLeague Final Four stage of the season. The award began in the 2004–05 season, and the winner is selected by the EuroLeague's head coaches. Dimitris Diamantidis of Panathinaikos Athens, won the first five awards, from 2005 to 2009.

== Winners ==
Bryant Dunston was the EuroLeague's Best Defender 2 times (2014, 2015).

Season	Position	Best Defender	Club	Ref.
2004–05	PG	(Greece) Dimitris Diamantidis	(Greece) Panathinaikos	
2005–06	PG	(Greece) Dimitris Diamantidis (2x)	(Greece) Panathinaikos	
2006–07	PG	(Greece) Dimitris Diamantidis (3x)	(Greece) Panathinaikos	
2007–08	PG	(Greece) Dimitris Diamantidis (4x)	(Greece) Panathinaikos	
2008–09	PG	(Greece) Dimitris Diamantidis (5x)	(Greece) Panathinaikos	
2009–10	PF	(Russia) Victor Khryapa	(Russia) CSKA Moscow	
2010–11	PG	(Greece) Dimitris Diamantidis (6x)	(Greece) Panathinaikos	
2011–12	SF	(Russia) Andrei Kirilenko	(Russia) CSKA Moscow	
2012–13	C	(Gabon) Stéphane Lasme	(Greece) Panathinaikos	
2013–14	C	(United States) Bryant Dunston	(Greece) Olympiacos	
2014–15	C	(United States) Bryant Dunston (2x)	(Greece) Olympiacos	
2015–16	C	(United States) Kyle Hines	(Russia) CSKA Moscow	
2016–17	SF	(Hungary) Ádám Hanga	(Spain) Baskonia	
2017–18	C	(United States) Kyle Hines (2x)	(Russia) CSKA Moscow	
2018–19	C	(Cape Verde) Edy Tavares	(Spain) Real Madrid	
2019–20	Not awarded ^{1}			
2020–21	C	(Cape Verde) Edy Tavares (2x)	(Spain) Real Madrid	
2021–22	C	(United States) Kyle Hines (3x)	(Italy) Olimpia Milano	
2022–23	C	(Cape Verde) Edy Tavares (3x)	(Spain) Real Madrid	
2023–24	PG	(United States) Thomas Walkup	(Greece) Olympiacos	
2024–25	PG	(Germany) Nick Weiler-Babb	(Germany) Bayern Munich	
2025–26	SF	(United States) Alpha Diallo	(France) Monaco	

Notes:

^1 There was no awarding in the 2019–20, because the season was cancelled due to the coronavirus pandemic in Europe.

== Multiple honors ==
=== Players ===
Number	Player
6	(Greece) Dimitris Diamantidis
3	(United States) Kyle Hines
3	(Cape Verde) Edy Tavares
2	(Armenia) Bryant Dunston
1	(Guinea) Alpha Diallo
1	(Hungary) Ádám Hanga
1	(Russia) Victor Khryapa
1	(Russia) Andrei Kirilenko
1	(Gabon) Stéphane Lasme
1	(Greece) Thomas Walkup
1	(Germany) Nick Weiler-Babb

=== Player nationality ===
Number	Country
7	Greece
6	United States
3	Cape Verde
2	Armenia
2	Russia
1	Gabon
1	Germany
1	Guinea
1	Hungary

=== Clubs ===
Number	Club
7	(Greece) Panathinaikos
4	(Russia) CSKA Moscow
3	(Spain) Real Madrid
3	(Greece) Olympiacos
1	(Spain) Baskonia
1	(Germany) Bayern Munich
1	(France) Monaco
1	(Italy) Olimpia Milano
