= Nikos Chatzis =

Greek basketball player (born 1976)

Nikos Chatzis Νίκος Χατζής
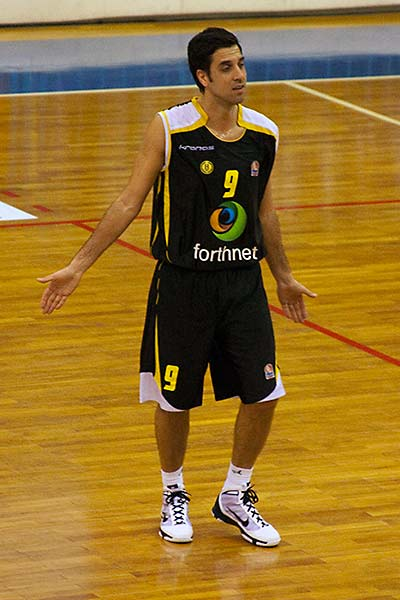
- Chatzis, as an Ilysiakos player, in 2009.

Personal information
- Born: 3 June 1976 (age 50) Kalamata, Greece
- Listed height: 6 ft 5 in (1.96 m)
- Listed weight: 200 lb (91 kg)

Career information
- Playing career: 1995–2015
- Position: Shooting guard / small forward
- Number: 9
- Coaching career: 2015–2019

Career history

Playing
- 1995–2005: AEK Athens
- 2005–2006: Olympiacos
- 2006–2007: Panionios
- 2007–2009: AEK Athens
- 2009–2014: Ilysiakos
- 2014–2015: Arkadikos

Coaching
- 2017–2019: AEK Athens (Cadets, Juniors)

Career highlights
- FIBA Saporta Cup champion (2000); Greek League champion (2002); 2× Greek Cup winner (2000, 2001); All-Greek League Team (2004); 6× Greek League All-Star (1996–1999, 2004, 2005); 2× Greek All-Star 3 Point Shootout champion (1999, 2003); Professional Greek League career stats leaders: Greek League all-time leader in games played
Medals
Men's basketball
Representing Greece
FIBA Europe U16 Championship
Gold medal – first place	1993 Turkey	Under-16
FIBA U19 World Cup
Gold medal – first place	1995 Greece	Under-19

Nikolaos "Nikos" Chatzis (alternative spelling: Hatzis) (Greek: Νίκος Χατζής; born 3 June 1976) is a retired Greek professional basketball player and coach. At a height of 1.96 m (6 ft 5 in) tall, he played at the shooting guard position. He is among the all-time leaders in the history of the Greek Basket League in points scored, assists, 3 pointers made, and games played (since the 1992–93 season).

== Playing career ==
=== Professional career ===
Chatzis started his basketball career with the Greek club Poseidon Kalamatas, and he turned professional in the year 1995, when he transferred to the Greek League club A.E.K. Chatzis stayed with A.E.K. for 10 consecutive years, and in the process, he became the team's all-time number one ranked player in modern-era Greek League competitions (since the league has been organized by HEBA 1992–present) in the following categories: points scored, games played, assists, and free throws made.

In the summer of 2005, A.E.K. decided to release Chatzis, and thus he continued his career with the Greek club Olympiacos. He played the next year with the Greek team Panionios, and he returned to A.E.K. in August 2007, after the changing of the club's chairman. In 2009, he moved to the Greek club Ilysiakos. In 2014, he moved to the Greek club Arkadikos. He officially retired as a player in December 2015, and began a career in coaching.

=== National team career ===
With the junior Greek national teams, Chatzis won the gold medal at both the 1993 FIBA Europe Under-16 Championship, and also at the 1995 FIBA Under-19 World Cup. He also tallied a total of 69 caps, and 336 points scored with the senior men's Greek national basketball team.

== Coaching career ==
Chatzis began his coaching career in 2015. In 2017, he became the head coach of AEK Athens' youth academies.

== Awards and accomplishments ==
=== Pro career ===
- 6× Greek All-Star Game: (1996 II, 1997, 1998, 1999, 2004, 2005)
- 2× Greek All-Star Game 3 Point Shootout Champion: (1999, 2003)
- 2× Greek Cup Winner: (2000, 2001)
- FIBA Saporta Cup Champion: (2000)
- Greek League Champion: (2002)
- Greek League Best Five: (2004)

=== Greek junior national team ===
- 1993 FIBA Europe Under-16 Championship: Gold
- 1995 FIBA Under-19 World Cup: Gold
