= 1999–2000 FIBA Saporta Cup =

- League: FIBA Saporta Cup
- Sport: Basketball

Final
- Champions: (Greece) AEK
- Runners-up: (Italy) Kinder Bologna
- Finals MVP: (United States) Anthony Bowie

FIBA Saporta Cup seasons
- ← 1998–99 2000–01 →

The 1999–2000 FIBA Saporta Cup was the thirty-fourth edition of FIBA's 2nd-tier level European-wide professional club basketball competition. It occurred between September 21, 1999, and April 11, 2000. The final was held at Lausanne, Switzerland.

== Competition system ==
- 48 teams (national domestic cup champions, plus the best qualified teams from the most important European national domestic leagues), entered a preliminary group stage, divided into eight groups of six teams each, and played a round-robin. The final standings were based on individual wins and defeats. In the case of a tie between two or more teams, after the group stage, the following criteria were used to decide the final classification: 1) number of wins in one-to-one games between the teams; 2) basket average between the teams; 3) general basket average within the group.
- The top four teams from each group qualified for a 1/16 Final Playoff (X-pairings, home and away games), where the winners advanced further to 1/8 Finals, 1/4 Finals, and 1/2 Final.
- The Final was played at a predetermined venue.

== Country ranking ==
For the 1999–2000 FIBA Saporta Cup, the countries are allocated places according to their place on the FIBA country rankings, which takes into account their performance in European competitions from 1996–97 to 1998–99.

Country ranking for 1999–2000 FIBA Saporta Cup

Rank	Country	Points	Teams	Notes
1	Italy	237.667	2	
2	Greece	179.167	2	
3	Spain	150.167	2	
4	Turkey	70.500	2	
5	France	68.833	2	
6	Lithuania	55.556	2	
7	FR Yugoslavia	54.500	2	
8	Russia	35.695	2	
9	Slovenia	30.622	2	
10	Germany	27.833	2	
11	Croatia	25.542	2	
12	Israel	22.108	2	
13	Poland	20.714	2	
14	Belgium	13.817	2	
15	Portugal	13.762	2	
16	Ukraine	6.143	2	-2, BIPA-Moda and CSKA Kyiv withdrew
17	Austria	4.559	1	
18	Hungary	4.429	1	+1, Matáv Pécs got wild card
19	Macedonia	4.375	1	

Rank	Country	Points	Teams	Notes
20	Cyprus	3.528	1	+1, Achilleas Kaimakli got wild card
21	Czech Republic	3.187	1	
22	Bosnia and Herzegovina	3.008	1	
23	Finland	2.917	1	+1, Torpan Pojat got wild card
24	Slovakia	2.583	1	
25	Latvia	2.302	1	
26	Bulgaria	1.917	1	
27	Netherlands	1.722	1	
28	Sweden	1.667	1	+1, Norrköping Dolphins got wild card
29	Estonia	0.667	1	
30	Romania	0.611	1	-1, Sibiu withdrew
31	Luxembourg	0.472	1	-1, Etzella withdrew
32	Switzerland	0.389	1	-1, Fribourg Olympic withdrew
33	Georgia	0.333	0	
34	England	0.278	0	+1, London Towers got wild card
35	Belarus	0.111	0	
36	Albania	0.055	0	
37	Denmark	0.000	0	
38	Ireland	0.000	0	

== Team allocation ==
The labels in the parentheses show how each team qualified for the place of its starting round:

- 1st, 2nd, 3rd, 4th, 5th, etc.: League position after eventual Playoffs
- CW: Cup winners
- WC: Wild card

Regular season
(Italy) Kinder Bologna (CW)	(Federal Republic of Yugoslavia) Partizan (CW)	(Poland) Zepter Idea Śląsk Wrocław (1st)	(Sweden) Plannja Basket (1st)
(Italy) Adecco Milano (5th)	(Federal Republic of Yugoslavia) Radnički Jugopetrol (4th)	(Poland) Hoop Pekaes (CW)	(Sweden) Norrköping Dolphins (WC)
(Greece) AEK (5th)	(Russia) Avtodor Saratov (2nd)	(Belgium) Spirou (1st)	(Austria) UKJ SÜBA Sankt Pölten (1st)
(Greece) Hercules (Note: G.S. Iraklis B.C. adopted the Latin name Hercules exclusively for this current season at FIBA Saporta Cup.) (6th)	(Russia) Arsenal Tula (3rd)	(Belgium) Okapi Aalstar (3rd)	(North Macedonia) Godel Rabotnički (1st)
(Spain) Tau Cerámica (CW)	(Slovenia) Krka (3rd)	(Portugal) Porto (1st)	(Czech Republic) Mlekarna Kunin (1st)
(Spain) Pamesa Valencia (6th)	(Slovenia) Kovinotehna Savinjska Polzela (4th)	(Portugal) Illiabum Clube (2nd)	(Bosnia and Herzegovina) Bosna (1st)
(Turkey) Fenerbahçe (4th)	(Germany) Telekom Baskets Bonn (2nd)	(Hungary) Albacomp Fehérvár (1st)	(Slovakia) Slovakofarma Pezinok (1st)
(Turkey) Darüşşafaka (5th)	(Germany) Skyliners Frankfurt (3rd)*	(Hungary) Matáv Pécs (WC)	(Latvia) Ventspils (2nd)
(France) Élan Chalon (4th)	(Croatia) Zadar (2nd)	(Cyprus) APOEL (1st)	(Bulgaria) Cherno More Port Varna (1st)
(France) PSG Racing Basket (5th)	(Croatia) Split CO (3rd)	(Cyprus) Achilleas Kaimakli (WC)	(Netherlands) Ricoh Astronauts (1st)
(Lithuania) Lietuvos rytas (2nd)	(Israel) Hapoel Jerusalem (2nd)	(Finland) Honka Playboys (2nd)	(Estonia) Tartu ÜSK Delta (4th)
(Lithuania) Sakalai (3rd)	(Israel) Maccabi Ra'anana (5th)	(Finland) Torpan Pojat (WC)	(England) London Towers (WC)

* Tatami Rhöndorf (3rd in the previous season of Bundesliga) merged with Skyliners Frankfurt (at that time newly formed club), so Skyliners took their place in the competition.

== Preliminary round ==
Key to colors
Qualified to Round of 32
Eliminated

=== Group A ===
	Team	Pld	W	L	PF	PA	Pts
1.	(Greece) AEK	10	9	1	827	663	19
2.	(Israel) Hapoel Jerusalem	10	6	4	789	726	15
3.	(Bulgaria) Cherno More Port Varna	10	5	5	809	876	15
4.	(Belgium) Spirou	10	5	5	756	75o	15
5.	(Finland) Honka Playboys	10	3	7	748	827	13
6.	(Russia) Avtodor Saratov	10	2	8	682	769	12

=== Group B ===
	Team	Pld	W	L	PF	PA	Pts
1.	(Spain) Pamesa Valencia	10	9	1	855	650	19
2.	(Croatia) Zadar	10	8	2	817	675	18
3.	(Cyprus) Achilleas Kaimakli	10	4	6	705	776	14
4.	(Slovenia) Kovinotehna Savinjska Polzela	10	4	6	755	779	14
5.	(Russia) Arsenal Tula	10	4	6	698	812	14
6.	(Estonia) Tartu ÜSK Delta	10	1	9	649	787	11

=== Group C ===
	Team	Pld	W	L	PF	PA	Pts
1.	(Lithuania) Lietuvos rytas	10	8	2	814	667	18
2.	(Israel) Maccabi Ra'anana	10	6	4	696	608	16
3.	(France) Élan Chalon	10	6	4	649	604	16
4.	(Netherlands) Ricoh Astronauts	10	5	5	622	623	15
5.	(Hungary) Albacomp Fehérvár	10	5	5	751	697	15
6.	(Cyprus) APOEL	10	0	10	513	846	10

=== Group D ===
	Team	Pld	W	L	PF	PA	Pts
1.	(France) PSG Racing	10	9	1	771	600	19
2.	(Poland) Hoop Pekaes	10	8	2	760	668	18
3.	(Spain) Tau Cerámica	10	7	3	808	659	17
4.	(Bosnia and Herzegovina) Bosna	10	4	6	644	714	14
5.	(Portugal) Illiabum Clube	10	1	9	692	855	11
6.	(North Macedonia) Godel Rabotnički	10	1	9	550	729	11

=== Group E ===
	Team	Pld	W	L	PF	PA	Pts
1.	(Greece) Hercules	10	9	1	743	656	19
2.	(Portugal) FC Porto	10	6	4	726	686	16
3.	(Slovakia) Slovakofarma Pezinok	10	5	5	786	782	15
4.	(Germany) Telekom Baskets Bonn	10	5	5	731	718	15
5.	(Federal Republic of Yugoslavia) Partizan	10	5	5	734	718	15
6.	(Austria) SÜBA Sankt Pölten	10	0	10	639	798	10

=== Group F ===
	Team	Pld	W	L	PF	PA	Pts
1.	(Italy) Kinder Bologna	10	10	0	885	586	20
2.	(Poland) Zepter Idea Śląsk Wrocław	10	7	3	743	692	17
3.	(Latvia) Ventspils	10	5	5	705	732	15
4.	(Sweden) Norrköping Dolphins	10	4	6	803	929	14
5.	(Turkey) Fenerbahçe	10	3	7	708	765	13
6.	(Hungary) Matáv Pécs	10	1	9	651	793	11

=== Group G ===
	Team	Pld	W	L	PF	PA	Pts
1.	(Turkey) Darüşşafaka	10	8	2	825	759	18
2.	(Croatia) Split CO	10	6	4	787	773	16
3.	(Sweden) Plannja	10	5	5	753	772	15
4.	(Italy) Adecco Milano	10	4	6	749	719	14
5.	(Belgium) Okapi Aalst	10	4	6	789	831	14
6.	(England) London Towers	10	3	7	789	838	13

=== Group H ===
	Team	Pld	W	L	PF	PA	Pts
1.	(Slovenia) Krka	10	7	3	774	659	17
2.	(Germany) Skyliners Frankfurt	10	7	3	750	681	17
3.	(Lithuania) Sakalai	10	7	3	791	771	17
4.	(Federal Republic of Yugoslavia) Radnički Jugopetrol	10	4	6	746	736	14
5.	(Finland) Torpan Pojat	10	3	7	673	808	13
6.	(Czech Republic) Mlekarna Kunin	10	2	8	723	802	12

== Round of 32 ==
Team 1	Agg.	Team 2	1st leg	2nd leg
Kovinotehna Savinjska Polzela (Slovenia)	95–154	(Greece) AEK	51–86	44–68
Achilleas Kaimakli (Cyprus)	133–188	(Israel) Hapoel Jerusalem	67–93	66–95
Cherno More (Bulgaria)	133–172	(Croatia) Zadar	63–73	70–99
Spirou (Belgium)	149–163	(Spain) Pamesa Valencia	74–81	75–82
Bosna (Bosnia and Herzegovina)	138–174	(Lithuania) Lietuvos rytas	65–71	73–103
Tau Cerámica (Spain)	139–129	(Israel) Maccabi Ra'anana	68–62	71–67
Élan Chalon (France)	153–145	(Poland) Hoop Pekaes	76–57	77–88
Ricoh Astronauts (Netherlands)	130–136	(France) PSG Racing	60–61	70–75
Norrköping Dolphins (Sweden)	144–206	(Greece) Hercules	64–87	80–119
Ventspils (Latvia)	122–157	(Portugal) FC Porto	47–77	75–80
Slovakofarma Pezinok (Slovakia)	160–170	(Poland) Zepter Śląsk Idea Wrocław	79–86	81–84
Telekom Baskets Bonn (Germany)	125–154	(Italy) Kinder Bologna	56–67	69–87
Radnički Jugopetrol (Federal Republic of Yugoslavia)	137–141	(Turkey) Darüşşafaka	77–66	60–75
Sakalai (Lithuania)	166–186	(Croatia) Split CO	86–97	80–89
Plannja (Sweden)	121–145	(Germany) Skyliners Frankfurt	63–74	58–71
Adecco Milano (Italy)	118–112	(Slovenia) Krka	62–55	56–57

== Round of 16 ==
Team 1	Agg.	Team 2	1st leg	2nd leg
Tau Cerámica (Spain)	132–156	(Greece) AEK	67–71	65–85
Élan Chalon (France)	119–146	(Spain) Pamesa Valencia	83–75	36–71
Hapoel Jerusalem (Israel)	148–157	(Lithuania) Lietuvos rytas	78–91	70–66
Zadar (Croatia)	143–129	(France) PSG Racing	76–57	67–72
Split CO (Croatia)	129–150	(Greece) Hercules	63–71	66–79
Skyliners Frankfurt (Germany)	115–140	(Italy) Kinder Bologna	62–57	53–83
FC Porto (Portugal)	135–127	(Turkey) Darüşşafaka	81–78	54–49
Zepter Śląsk Idea Wrocław (Poland)	137–121	(Italy) Adecco Milano	75–57	62–64

== Quarterfinals ==
Team 1	Agg.	Team 2	1st leg	2nd leg
AEK (Greece)	154–146	(Greece) Hercules	84–73	70–73
Kinder Bologna (Italy)	144–139	(Spain) Pamesa Valencia	85–61	59–78
Lietuvos rytas (Lithuania)	170–160	(Portugal) FC Porto	93–73	77–87
Zepter Śląsk Idea Wrocław (Poland)	120–132	(Croatia) Zadar	56–63	64–69

== Semifinals ==
Team 1	Agg.	Team 2	1st leg	2nd leg
Zadar (Croatia)	142–152	(Greece) AEK	75–70	67–82
Lietuvos rytas (Lithuania)	141–143	(Italy) Kinder Bologna	70–60	71–83

== Final ==
April 11, Centre Intercommunal de Glace de Malley, Lausanne

Team 1	Score	Team 2
AEK (Greece)	83–76	(Italy) Kinder Bologna

== Rosters ==
(Greece) AEK: Angelos Koronios, Anthony Bowie, Michalis Kakiouzis, Martin Müürsepp, Iakovos Tsakalidis; Nikos Chatzis (C), Dimos Dikoudis, Steve Hansell, Dan O'Sullivan. Coach: Dusan Ivkovic
(Italy) Kinder Bologna: Alessandro Abbio, Hugo Sconochini, Predrag Danilovic (C), Nikos Ikonomou, David Andersen; Alessandro Frosini, Saulius Stombergas. Coach: Ettore Messina

1999–2000 FIBA Saporta Cup Champions

AEK
2nd title

== Awards ==
=== FIBA Saporta Cup Finals MVP ===
- (United States) Anthony Bowie ( (Greece) AEK Athens)

== See also ==
- 1998–99 FIBA Euroleague
- 1999–00 FIBA Korać Cup
