= Panathinaikos B.C. =

Greek professional basketball team

Panathinaikos AKTOR Athens
- Nickname: Trifýlli (The Shamrock); Prássini (The Greens); PAO
- Leagues: Greek Basketball League; EuroLeague
- Founded: 1919; 107 years ago
- History: Panathinaikos B.C. (1919–present)
- Arena: Telekom Center Athens
- Capacity: 19,250
- Location: Athens, Greece
- Team colors: Green, White
- Main sponsor: Pame Stoixima; AKTOR (naming partner)
- CEO: Giorgos Athanasiou
- President: Vassileios Parthenopoulos
- Vice-president: Giorgos Moireas
- General manager: Dimitris Kontos
- Team manager: Giorgos Gkotzogiannis
- Head coach: Željko Obradović
- Team captain: Kostas Sloukas
- Ownership: Dimitris Giannakopoulos
- International titles: 7 EuroLeague titles (1996, 2000, 2002, 2007, 2009, 2011, 2024); 1 Intercontinental Cup (1996)
- Domestic titles: 40 Greek Championships (1946, 1947, 1950, 1951, 1954, 1961, 1962, 1967, 1969, 1971, 1972, 1973, 1974, 1975, 1977, 1980, 1981, 1982, 1984, 1998, 1999, 2000, 2001, 2003, 2004, 2005, 2006, 2007, 2008, 2009, 2010, 2011, 2013, 2014, 2017, 2018, 2019, 2020, 2021, 2024); 22 Greek Cup titles (1979, 1982, 1983, 1986, 1993, 1996, 2003, 2005, 2006, 2007, 2008, 2009, 2012, 2013, 2014, 2015, 2016, 2017, 2019, 2021, 2025, 2026); 1 Greek Super Cup (2021)
- Other titles: 2 Triple Crowns (2007, 2009)
- Retired numbers: 3 (1, 4, 13)
- Website: paobc.gr
Home	Away

Panathinaikos B.C. (Greek: ΚΑΕ Παναθηναϊκός), also simplified to Panathinaikos or PAO and officially referred to as Panathinaikos AKTOR Athens for sponsorship reasons, is the professional basketball team of the major Athens-based multi-sport club Panathinaikos A.O. It is owned by the Giannakopoulos family.

The parent athletic club was founded in 1908, while the basketball team was established in 1919. Panathinaikos, along with Aris, are the only Greek teams never to have been relegated from the top division, with participation in every Greek First Division Championship.

Panathinaikos has developed into the most successful basketball club in Greek basketball history and one of the most successful teams in European basketball. The team has won seven EuroLeague Championships, forty Greek Basket League Championships, twenty-two Greek Cups, one Intercontinental Cup, one Greek Super Cup, and two Triple Crowns. The Greens count one more Greek Championship (forty-one in total), that took place in 1921 and was organized by the YMCA, but is not officially recognized, because it was before the creation of the Hellenic Basketball Association. They hold the world record for the longest title-winning streak, spanning 27 seasons from 1995–96 to 2021–22, during which the team won at least one title each season.

The team plays its home games at the Telekom Center Athens, also known as Nikos Galis Olympic Indoor Hall with a capacity of 18,300.

Many top-class players have represented the club over the years, including Dominique Wilkins, Fragiskos Alvertis, Byron Scott, Nick Galis, John Salley, Dimitris Diamantidis, Antonio Davis, Stojko Vranković, Dino Rađja, Šarūnas Jasikevičius, Dejan Bodiroga, Nick Calathes, Nikola Peković, Panagiotis Giannakis, Fanis Christodoulou, Mike Batiste, Antonis Fotsis, Kostas Tsartsaris, Željko Rebrača, Vassilis Spanoulis, Dejan Tomašević, Nikos Oikonomou, Ramūnas Šiškauskas, Mike James, İbrahim Kutluay, Sani Bečirovič, Jaka Lakovič, Marcelo Nicola, Hugo Sconochini, Nando Gentile, Pepe Sánchez, Darryl Middleton, Lazaros Papadopoulos, Žarko Paspalj, Nikos Chatzivrettas, Drew Nicholas, Stratos Perperoglou, Byron Dinkins, Oded Kattash, Alexander Volkov, John Amaechi, Tiit Sokk, Sofoklis Schortsanitis, Jason Kapono, Arijan Komazec, Edgar Jones, Romain Sato, Johnny Rogers, Tony Delk, James Gist, Stéphane Lasme, Jonas Mačiulis, Roko Ukić, Robertas Javtokas, Ioannis Bourousis, Keith Langford, Jimmer Fredette, Kostas Sloukas, Juancho Hernangómez, Mathias Lessort, Kendrick Nunn and Cedi Osman. Players of that caliber, under the wing of the Giannakopoulos family and guided by top basketball coaches, such as Rick Pitino, Božidar Maljković, Xavi Pascual and later Ergin Ataman, but mainly Željko Obradović who coached the team for 13 straight years, winning at that time with the Greens 5 EuroLeague titles, 11 Greek Championships and 7 Greek Cups, have made Panathinaikos one of the biggest powerhouses in European basketball history.

Panathinaikos is the only team on the European continent to win seven EuroLeague titles (1996, 2000, 2002, 2007, 2009, 2011, and 2024) since the establishment of the modern EuroLeague Final Four format in 1988 (no other club has won more than four championships in this period). They were also runners-up in 2001. Panathinaikos reached the EuroLeague Final Four thirteen times overall (1994, 1995, 1996, 2000, 2001, 2002, 2005, 2007, 2009, 2011, 2012, 2024, 2025).

== History ==
=== Basketball in Greece (1918–1945) ===
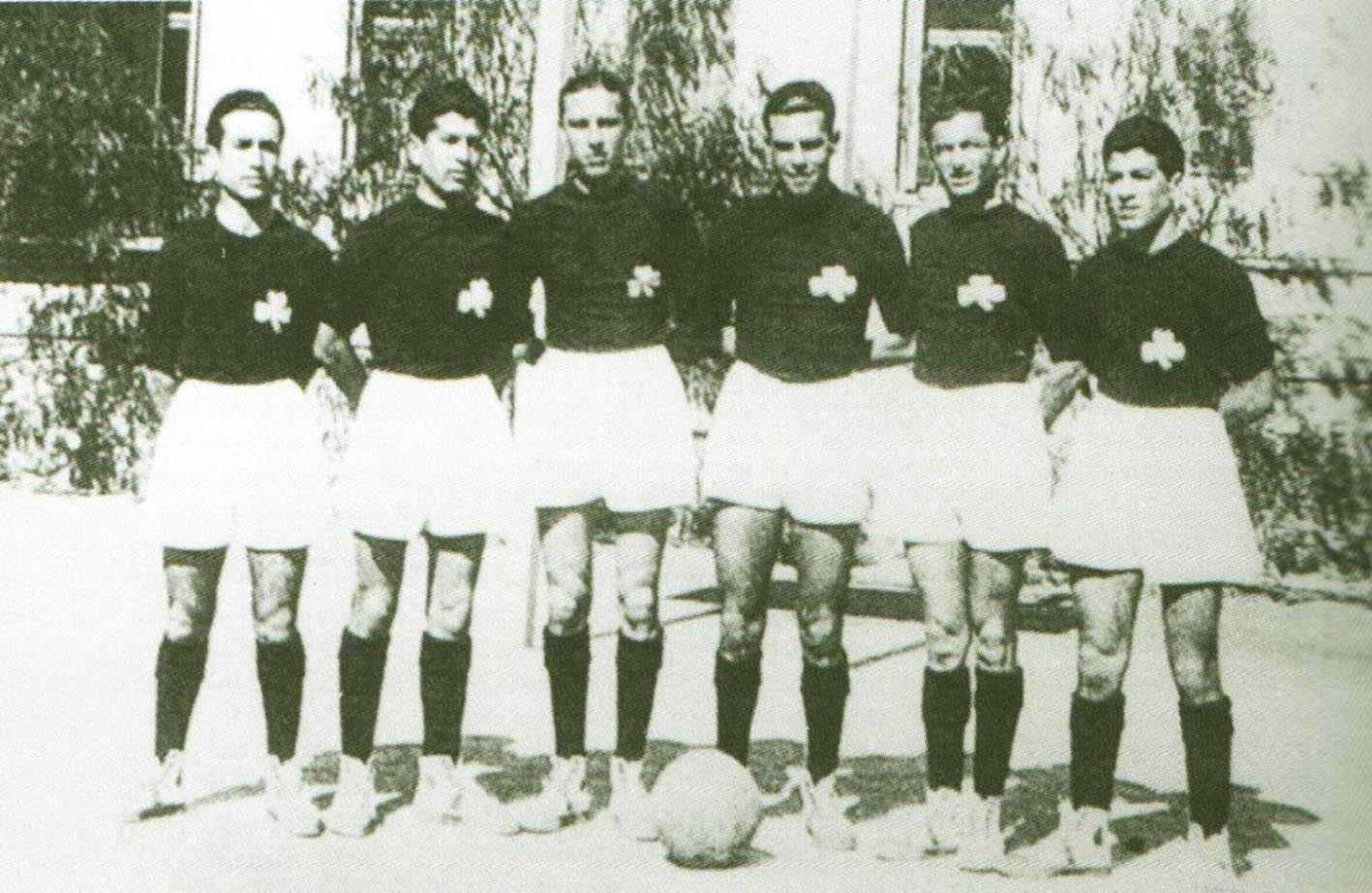
The basketball team of 1940

Panathinaikos started as a football club in 1908. In 1919, basketball was still unknown in Greece. During that period, Giorgos Kalafatis with other athletes participated in the Inter-Allied Games in Paris and attended basketball games between the Allies of World War I. When he later returned to Greece with the necessary equipment, he set up the Panathinaikos basketball club, led by Apostolos Nikolaidis.

In 1919, Panathinaikos played their first match against X.A.N. Thessaloniki (YMCA), another club also pioneer of basketball in Greece, a match which took place at the Panathenaic Stadium.

In 1937, Giorgos Kalafatis managed to create a new Panathinaikos team that, during the following year, tried to catch up with already established clubs like the YMCA, Ethnikos G.S. Athens, Panionios, Aris and Iraklis. Angelos Fillipou, Nikos Mantzaroglou, Litsas and Dimitrakos were the ringleaders of the group and were later joined by Telis Karagiorgos, Thymios Karadimos, Giorgos Bofilios, Philipos Papaikonomou, Petros Polycratis and Nikos Polycratis. During the German occupation that followed, Dimitris Giannatos (founding member of the basketball team) was executed by the German occupation forces as a member of the resistance action group “Ivanov.”

=== Postwar history (1946–1970) ===
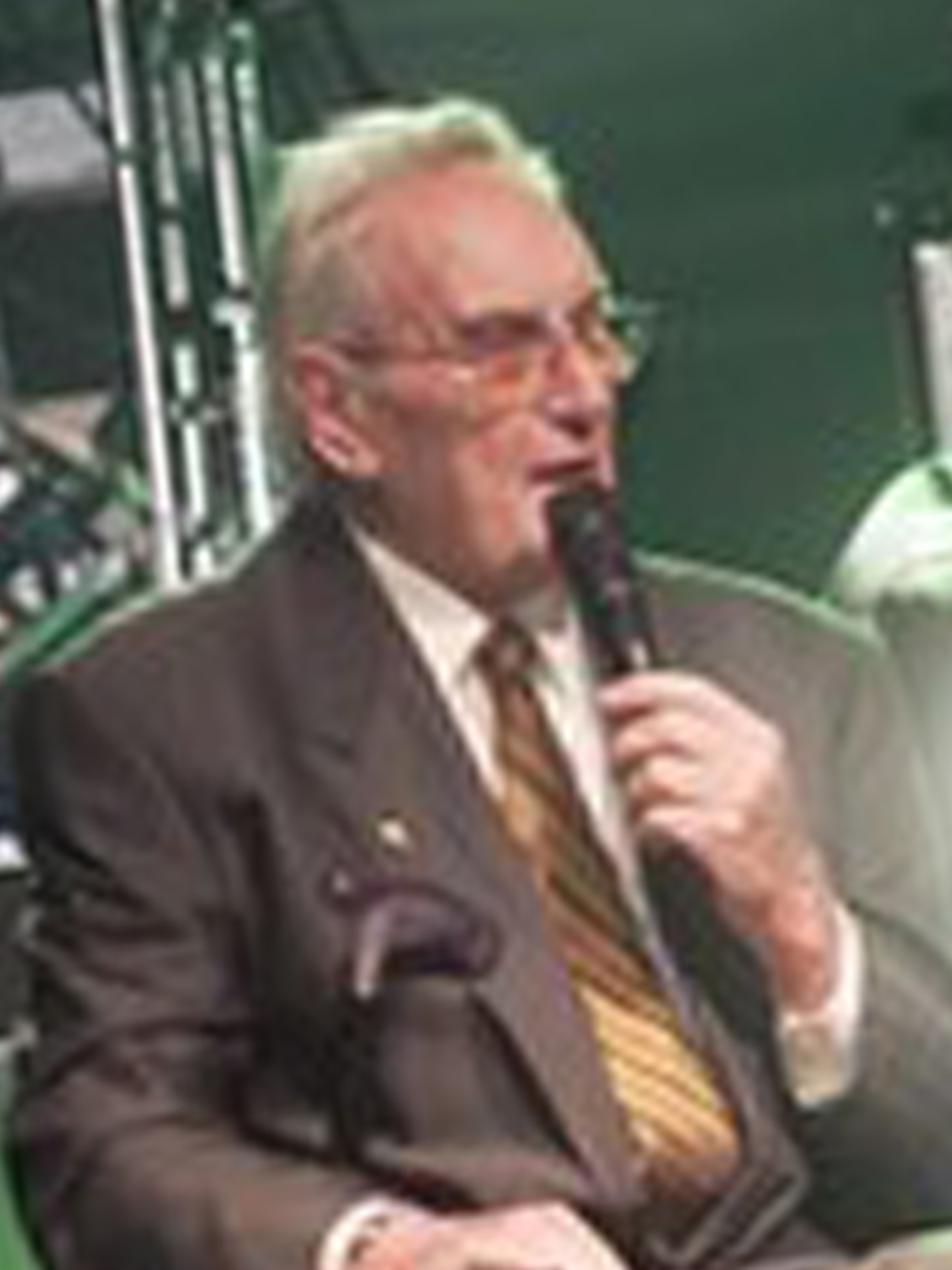
Faidon Matthaiou

In 1946 (the first post‑war championship) and 1947, Panathinaikos emerged as champions, with the help of players like Ioannis Lambrou, Missas Pantazopoulos, and Stelios Arvanitis (these players would later go on to win the bronze medal in EuroBasket 1949), as well as Jack Nicolaidis (nephew of Apostolos Nikolaidis).

In 1950 and 1951, Panathinaikos again emerged as champions, with key contributions from Faidon Matthaiou (considered the Patriarch of Greek basketball) and Nikos Milas. In 1954, the club repeated this success. The following five years were fruitless, as shown by the lack of championships until 1960–61, marking a period of renewal for the team.

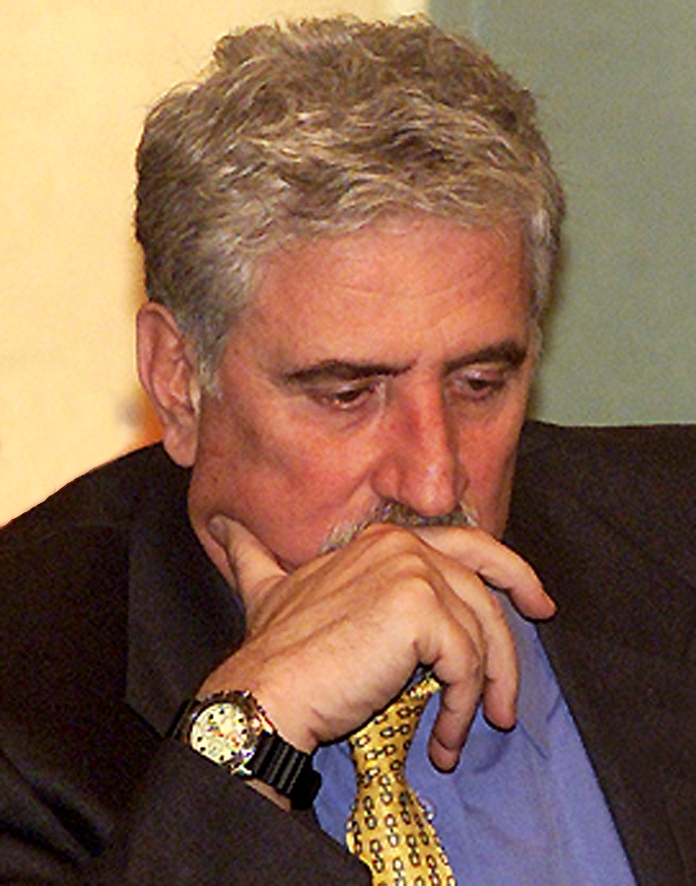
Giorgos Kolokythas

In 1961, Panathinaikos won the Greek League championship with new leaders Georgios Vassilakopoulos, Stelios Tavoularis, and Petros Panagiotarakos. In 1962, Panathinaikos repeated as Greek League champions. That year, PAO also took part in a European-wide competition for the first time, facing Hapoel Tel Aviv in the FIBA European Champions Cup 1961–62 season.

On 23 November 1963, Panathinaikos defeated Olympiacos by a score of 90–48 in the Mantellos Cup, a tournament that was later replaced by the Greek Cup, which made its first appearance in 1976.

In 1967, Panathinaikos were crowned Greek League champions, with Giorgos Kolokithas (one of the greatest basketball players of his era) among their ranks.

In 1969, the conquest of the Greek League championship was followed by the club's first European success, reaching the semifinals of the FIBA European Cup Winners' Cup 1968–69 season, where they were eliminated by Dinamo Tbilisi.

The next year, 1970, PAO became the first Greek basketball team to include a foreign player (Craig Greenwood) in a European game.

=== The Golden Age (1970–1984) ===
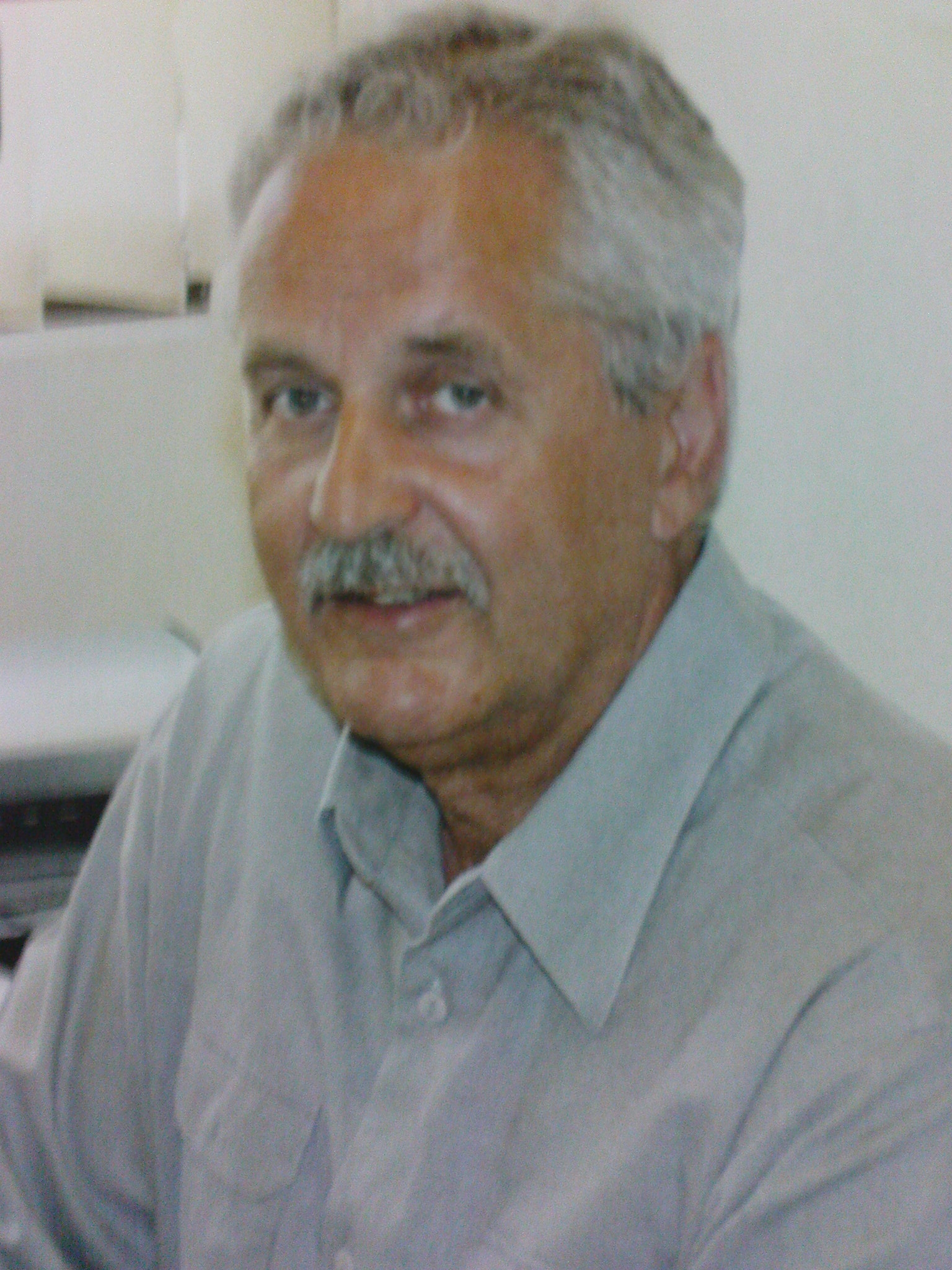
Apostolos Kontos

During these golden years, Panathinaikos won 10 out of 14 Greek League championships, with their great leader and scorer Apostolos Kontos.

During this period, Kostas Mourouzis, nicknamed the fox of coaching, managed the "team of the 4 Ks" — the young Kontos, Koroneos, Kokolakis, and Kefalos. These players, along with Iordanidis, who acted as a link with older players, won five consecutive Greek League championships and achieved one of the greatest accomplishments of their era by reaching the semifinals of the FIBA European Champions Cup 1971–72 season, aided by American Willy Kirkland. Unfortunately, Ignis Varese, one of the giants of the era, proved an insurmountable obstacle for Panathinaikos.

Over the next four seasons, Panathinaikos captured the Greek League championship once, in 1977, and also won their first Greek Cup in 1979. They acquired Memos Ioannou in 1974 and Greek-American David Stergakos in 1979, a player who would contribute greatly to the team in the coming years.

In the following five years, Panathinaikos won four Greek League championships (1980, 1981, 1982, 1984) and two Greek Cups (1982, 1983). Specifically, in 1982, while coached by Kostas Politis, Panathinaikos achieved their first Greek double, as well as a 6th-place finish in the FIBA European Champions Cup 1981–82 season. During the group stage of that season, Panathinaikos finished ahead of a strong CSKA Moscow team, winning a thrilling last-second game. The club's last Greek League championship before the subsequent decline came in 1984, when Panathinaikos won the decisive match in Corfu, with Liveris Andritsos and Tom Kappos starring for the team.

Panathinaikos also had a chance to avoid the upcoming decline when they discovered Rony Seikaly, but Greek government bureaucratic issues prevented him from playing in the Greek League as a Greek citizen, despite claims that he was entitled to do so. This ultimately forced him to move to the United States to play college basketball at Syracuse.

=== The decline of 1985–1992 ===
In 1985, PAO finished in 3rd place in the Greek League. Stergakos, Ioannou, Vidas, Andritsos, and Koroneos — who left the following year — were the key players. However, the balance of power in the Greek League had shifted in favour of Aris, and Panathinaikos ceased to be the league leader, assuming a secondary role. Nevertheless, they remained a worthy adversary. In 1986, against all odds, they eliminated the powerful Aris from the Greek Cup at the semifinal stage. Panathinaikos then defeated Olympiacos in the final, claiming what would be their last title until 1993. During the next two seasons, PAO finished in 5th place in the Greek League, marking their worst results in many years.

In 1988, the ban on foreign players in the Greek League was lifted, allowing Panathinaikos to acquire Edgar Jones from the NBA. He proved to be a capable shooter, scorer, and rebounder, and for the next two years, he was the star of the team. Although PAO achieved significant wins over other major Greek teams, they did not secure any notable distinctions. Over the next two years, Antonio Davis, who later had a distinguished NBA career, replaced Jones as the team leader.

During this period, Panathinaikos also acquired some of the most talented young Greek players, including Fragiskos Alvertis, Nikos Oikonomou, and Christos Myriounis. Despite this promising roster, the club experienced its worst period in history, finishing 7th in the Greek League in 1991 and dropping to 8th place in 1992, leaving them outside of European-wide competition for the first time since 1967.

=== Return to distinction (1992–1995) ===
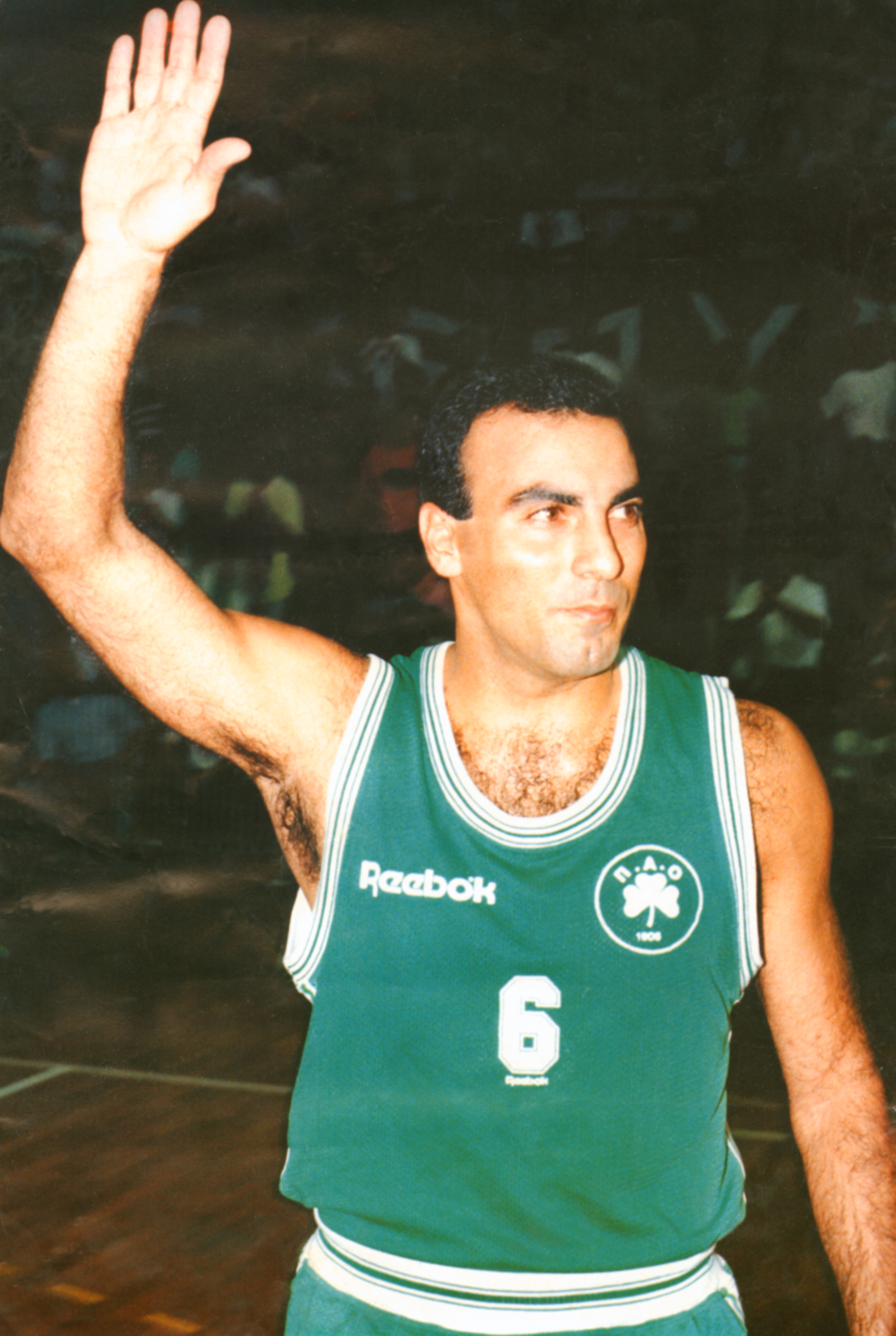
Nikos Galis

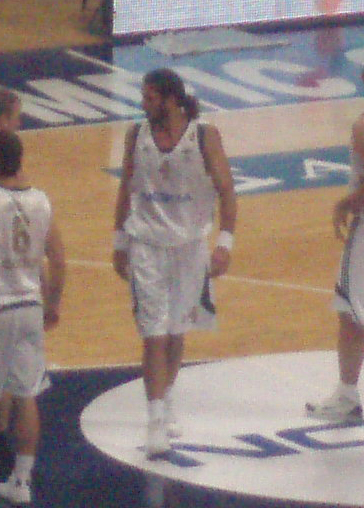
Fragiskos Alvertis

In 1992, Panathinaikos’ basketball department became professional under the management of the Giannakopoulos family. That summer, the club undertook a full reconstruction of the team, acquiring Nikos Galis, widely regarded as Greece's top basketball player, who was joined by star players Stojko Vranković, Tiit Sokk, Arijan Komazec, and Sasha Volkov. Galis led Panathinaikos to a Greek Cup victory. The team reached the Greek League championship finals but ultimately lost the title after withdrawing from the decisive fourth game in protest against refereeing decisions in Game 3.

In the 1993–94 season, Galis, along with Sasha Volkov and Stojko Vranković, were key figures in Panathinaikos’ campaign, which culminated in a 3rd-place finish at the 1994 FIBA European League Final Four, the highest placement in the club's history at that time.

The 1994–95 season began with strong prospects as Panathinaikos acquired Panagiotis Giannakis and Žarko Paspalj, making the team a favorite for all domestic titles. The club eliminated Olympiacos in a tough Greek Cup match before the start of the Greek League championship, winning 42–40 on 24 September 1994. However, after the first few games of the Greek League, Nikos Galis retired from professional basketball, having been instrumental in both the Greek Cup victory and the decisive FIBA European League qualifiers. Despite some strong performances, the team finished 3rd place in Europe. Panathinaikos also reached the Greek League finals, losing 3–2 to Olympiacos.

=== European, Intercontinental and Greek Champions (1996–1999) ===
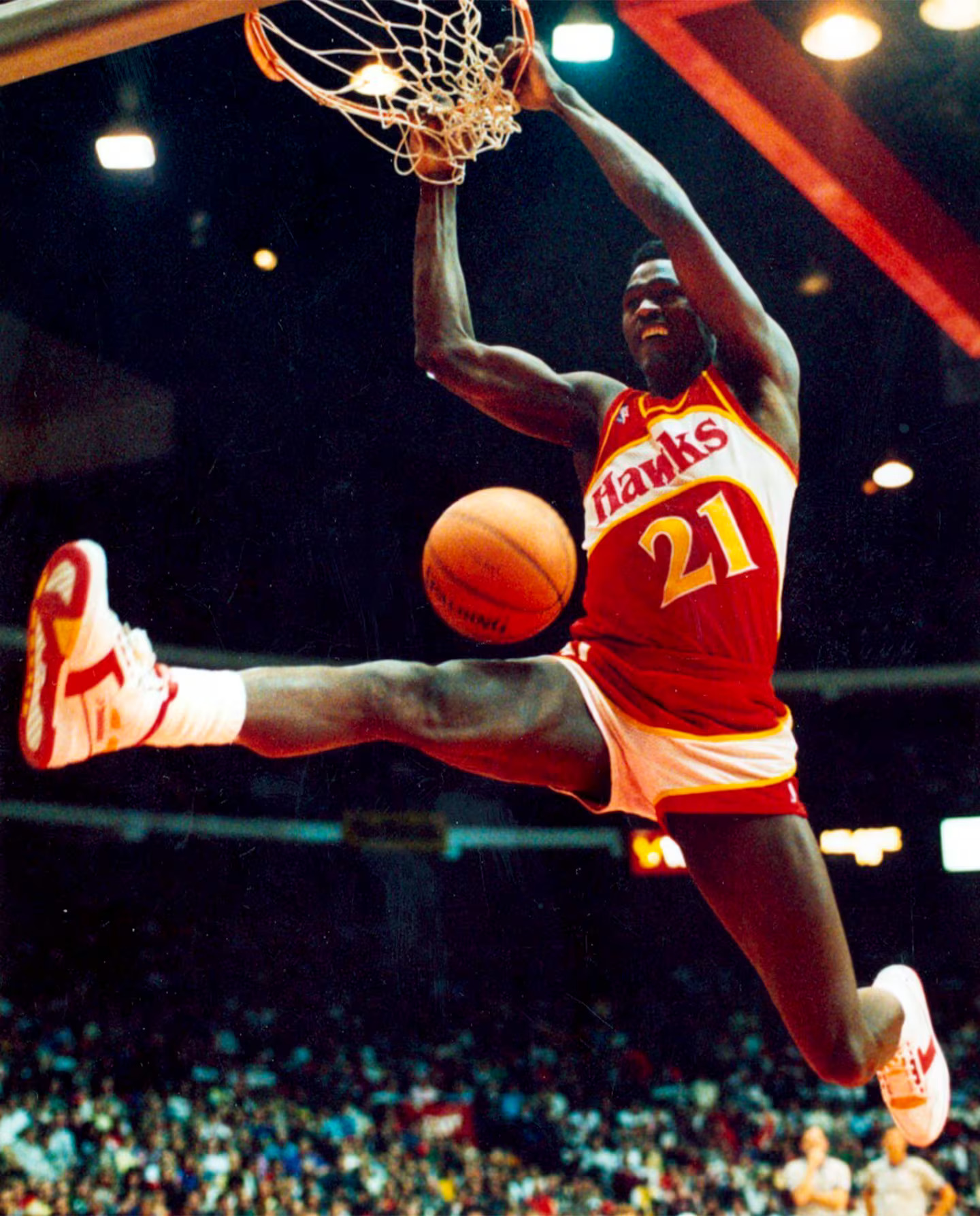
Dominique Wilkins

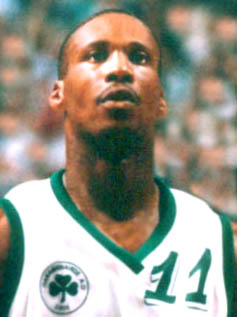
Byron Scott

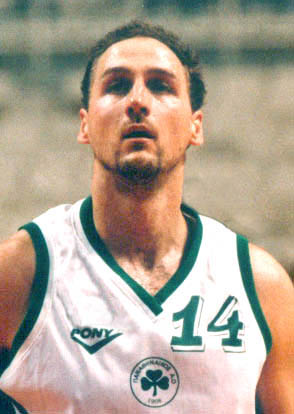
Dino Rađja

During the years 1996–98, Panathinaikos fulfilled all of their objectives by winning the FIBA European League championship, the FIBA Intercontinental Cup, and the Greek League championship (in that order).

In 1996, expectations for the team were very high, as it was imperative for Panathinaikos to obtain a significant title. In the summer of 1995, they acquired the nine-time NBA All-Star, Dominique Wilkins, one of the top American players to ever play in Europe. The head coach was Božidar Maljković. Along with Giannakis, Vranković, Alvertis, and Patavoukas, they comprised a very experienced roster. In April 1996, at the Paris Final Four, Panathinaikos became the first Greek team to lift the EuroLeague championship, defeating Banca Catalana FC Barcelona 67–66. Back in Greece, the team did not win the Greek League that season, losing to Olympiacos.

For the 1996–97 season, Maljković restructured the roster to emphasize teamwork. Panathinaikos won the 1996 FIBA Intercontinental Cup by defeating Olimpia of Venado Tuerto 2–1 in a three-game series. However, the team finished 5th in the Greek League, losing the right to participate in the next season's EuroLeague.

In the 1997–98 season, Slobodan Subotić became head coach. The club signed Dino Rađja, Byron Scott, Fanis Christodoulou, and several other players. With contributions from Alvertis, Oikonomou, and Koch, Panathinaikos captured the Greek League championship, ending a 14-year domestic title drought.

In the summer of 1998, chairman Pavlos Giannakopoulos reinforced the roster with Dejan Bodiroga, Nando Gentile, Pat Burke, and Nikos Boudouris. During the 1998–99 Greek League playoffs, Olympiacos held home-court advantage, but Panathinaikos captured the decisive away victory in the final to secure the title.

=== Obradović era (1999–2012) ===
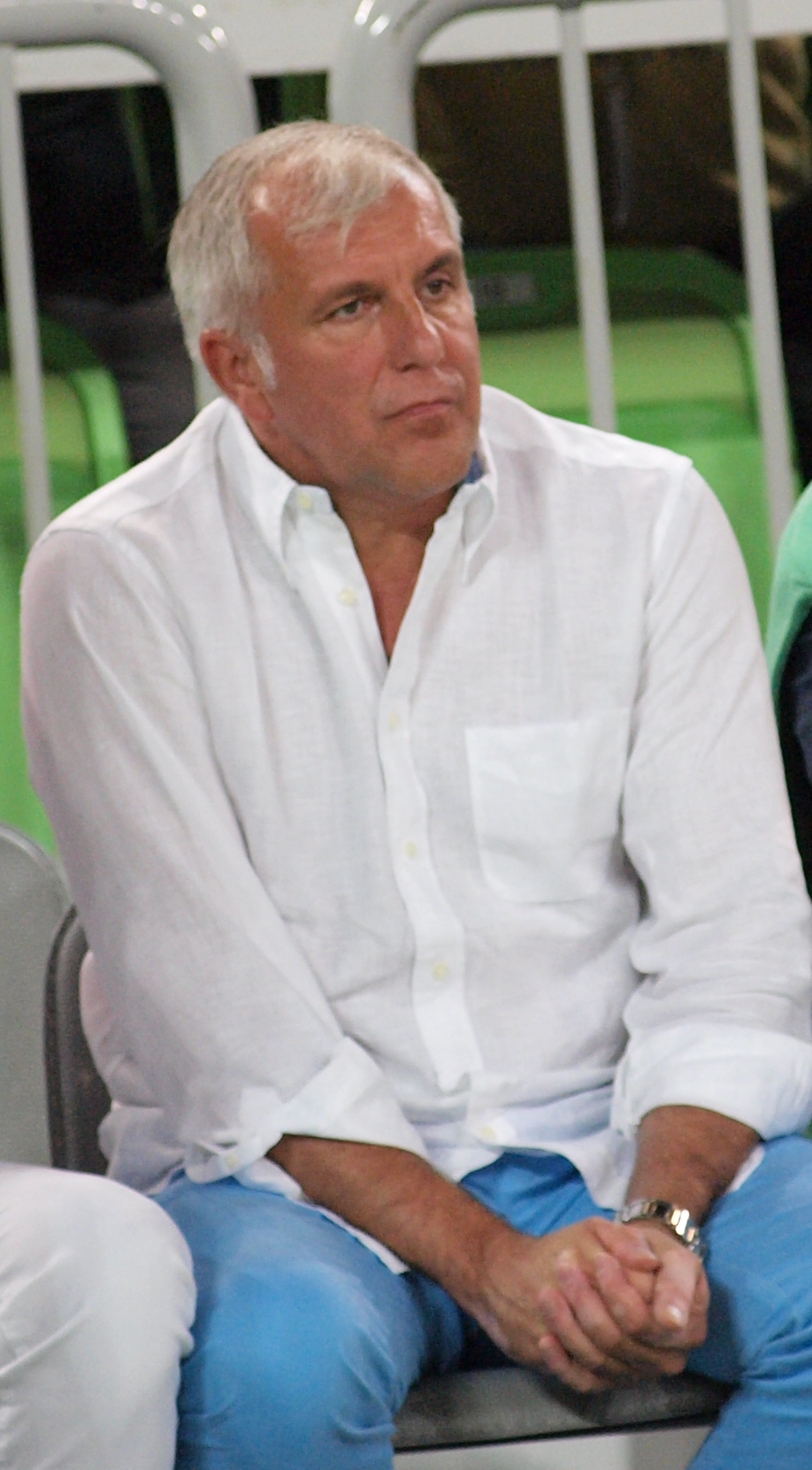
Željko Obradović

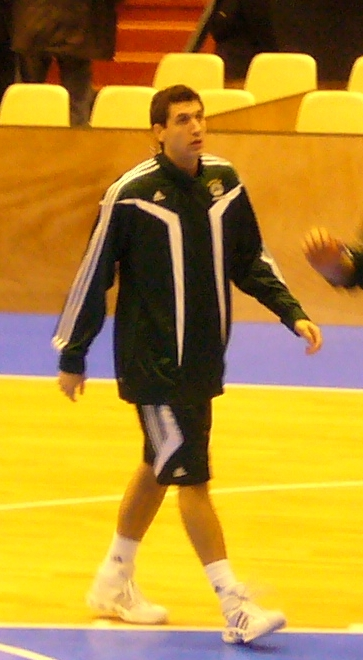
Dimitris Diamantidis lead the EuroLeague in all-time assists, steals and PIR since the 2000–01 season, and was a six time EuroLeague Best Defender.

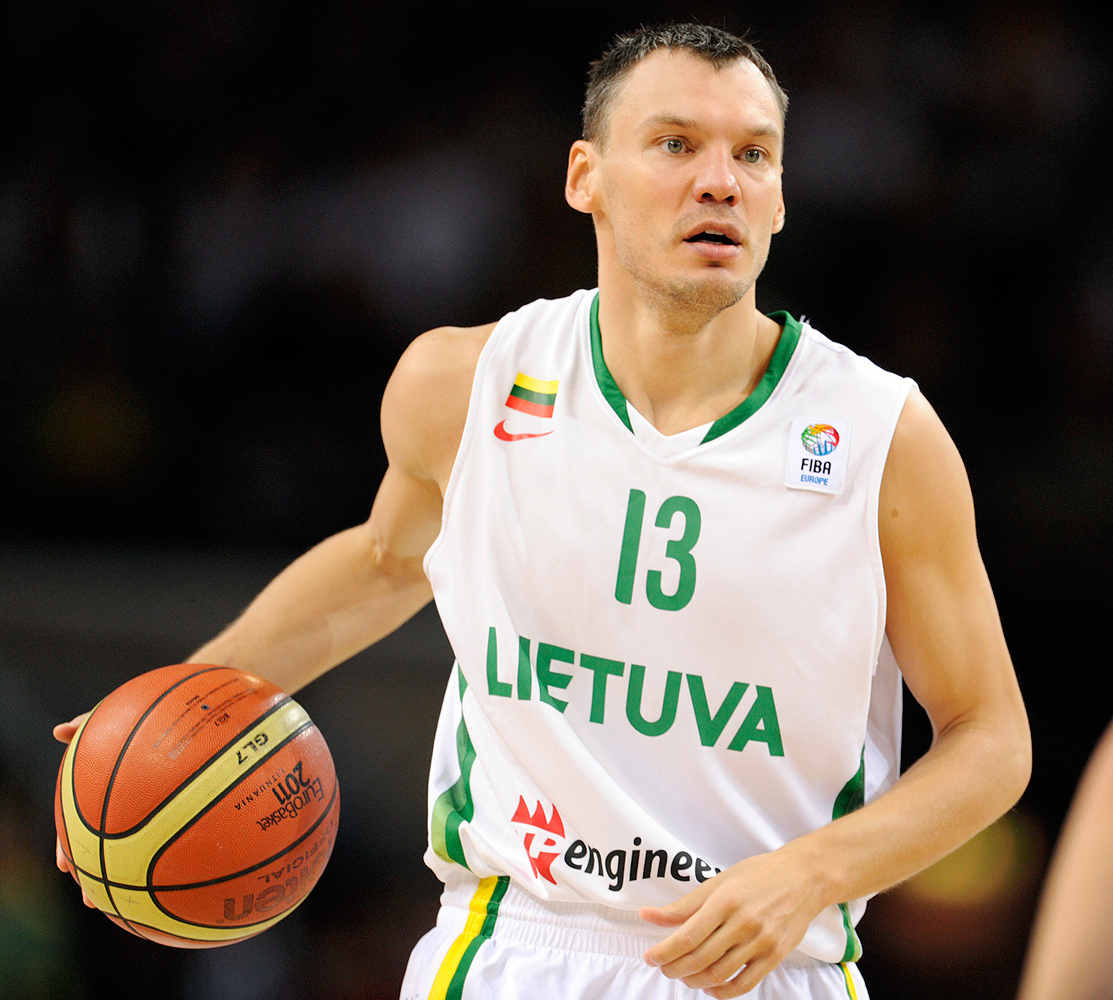
Šarūnas Jasikevičius

The arrival of Željko Obradović at Panathinaikos in the summer of 1999 marked the beginning of an extraordinary era for the club, establishing it as one of the strongest teams in European club basketball history.

Obradović's first task was to build the team around Dejan Bodiroga, Panathinaikos’ absolute leader at the time. This strategy proved highly successful: Panathinaikos captured two EuroLeague titles (2000 and 2002) after three consecutive EuroLeague Finals appearances (2000–2002), and won three consecutive Greek League championships (1998–99, 1999–2000, 2000–01).

In 2000, at the Thessaloniki EuroLeague Final Four, Panathinaikos defeated Maccabi Tel Aviv 73–67 to win its second EuroLeague title. In 2002, at the 2002 EuroLeague Final Four in Bologna, Panathinaikos defeated hosts Kinder Bologna 89–83, securing its third EuroLeague trophy.

Despite these successes, Panathinaikos did not win the Greek Cup during this period. Notable players included Rebrača, Gentile, Middleton, Alvertis, Kattash, Kutluay, and Fotsis. Panathinaikos’ Greek League dominance was interrupted in 2002 — the same year they won their third EuroLeague title — and the departure of Bodiroga necessitated a roster renewal.

The 2002–03 season marked the start of Obradović's restructuring of Panathinaikos. He returned the team to the top of Greek basketball, eventually leading them to nine consecutive Greek League championships (2003‑04 through 2010‑11), six domestic doubles, and two triple crowns (Greek League, Greek Cup, and EuroLeague) in subsequent years, establishing a true dynasty. With Bodiroga gone, the team shifted from a star-centric model to a system focused on teamwork. Players such as Lakovič, Alvertis, Diamantidis, Fotsis, Tsartsaris, Batiste, and later Spanoulis, Šiškauskas, and Jasikevičius prioritized team success over individual accolades, transforming Panathinaikos into a title-winning machine independent of any single superstar.

At the 2007 EuroLeague Final Four, held on their home court at Telekom Center Athens in Athens, Panathinaikos defeated defending champions CSKA Moscow 93–91 to win their fourth EuroLeague title. The two teams met again in the 2009 EuroLeague Final Four final in Berlin, where Panathinaikos won 73–71 for their fifth EuroLeague trophy. On 14 December 2009, Panathinaikos was voted the top Greek sports team of the year, while Obradović was voted top coach.

At the 2011 EuroLeague Final Four in Barcelona, Panathinaikos defeated Montepaschi Siena 77–69 in the semifinals, with Calathes contributing 17 points, six rebounds, and two steals. In the final, Panathinaikos overcame Maccabi Tel Aviv 78–70, securing their sixth EuroLeague title and further cementing their status as Greece's “Great Club.”

=== Post-Obradović period (2012–2018) ===
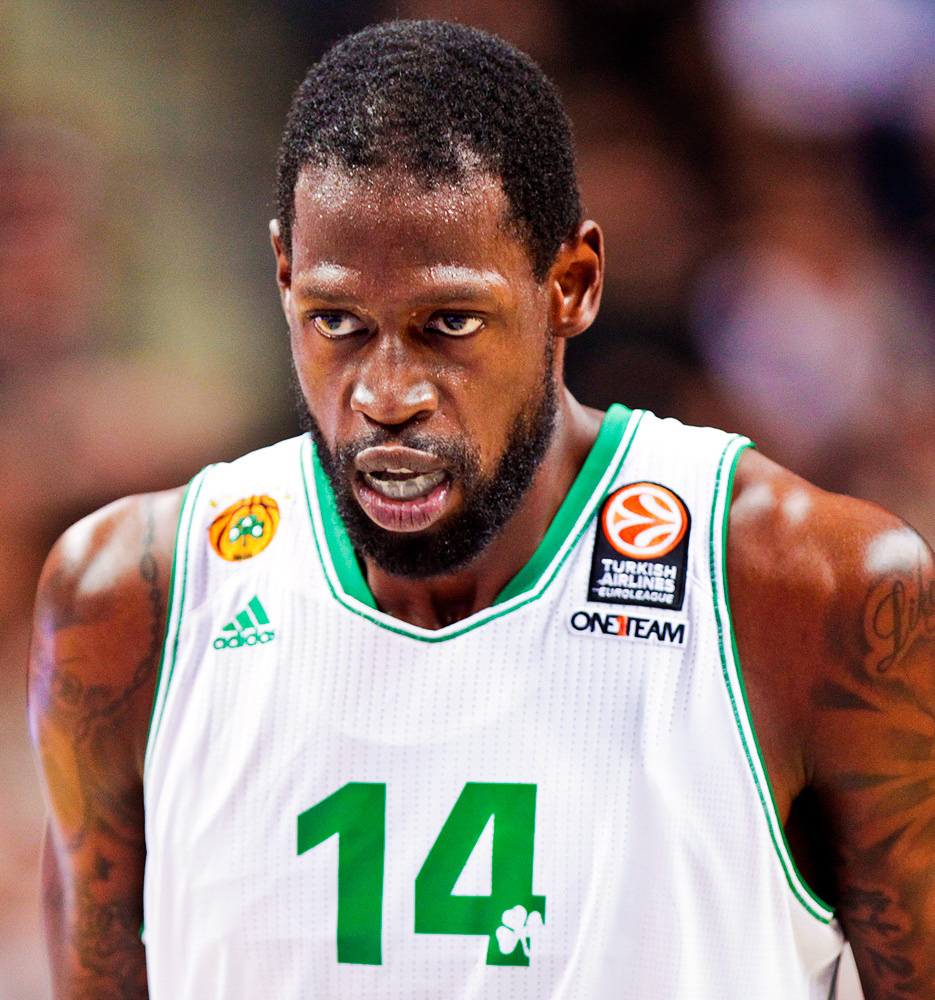
James Gist

After the departure of Obradović, Panathinaikos' new head coach, Argiris Pedoulakis, was forced to make extensive changes to the team, adding 12 new players to the roster, including James Gist, Roko Ukić, and NBA players Jason Kapono and Marcus Banks. Team captains Dimitris Diamantidis and Kostas Tsartsaris led the rebuilding effort for the Greens, who reached the EuroLeague quarterfinals, only to fall to FC Barcelona Regal in a five-game series. Panathinaikos won their 14th Greek Cup by beating Olympiacos in the final with a three-point difference (81–78). During the same season, Panathinaikos managed to defeat Olympiacos twice on their home court in the Greek League Finals, winning the championship for the 33rd time in the club's history.

Since Dimitris Giannakopoulos became chairman of Panathinaikos, he made repeated efforts to secure marketing partnerships with Asian corporations. The first step came when Panathinaikos announced the signing of Chinese basketball player Shang Ping, making them the first European club to feature a Chinese player on its roster. On 12 September 2013, Panathinaikos arrived in Guangzhou, becoming the first European team to travel to China by air for a basketball series. The following day, 13 September, Panathinaikos made European basketball history again, becoming the first European club to face a CBA team. They also became the first European team to defeat a Chinese team, the Foshan Dralions, with a score of 66–67.

On 8 March 2014, following fan dissatisfaction with the team's performance in the EuroLeague, the club announced the dismissal of head coach Argiris Pedoulakis. Fragiskos Alvertis, a legendary figure of the club, was appointed interim caretaker coach. Under his guidance, Panathinaikos achieved another domestic double, defeating Olympiacos in both the Greek Basketball Cup and the Greek Basket League Finals. Shortly afterward, Duško Ivanović was appointed as the club's new head coach.

On 5 April 2015, Panathinaikos defeated Apollon Patras in the Greek Cup Final with a score of 53–68, having previously overcome Olympiacos and PAOK in earlier rounds. The team also reached the EuroLeague playoffs but lost in the Greek League Finals to Olympiacos 0–3.

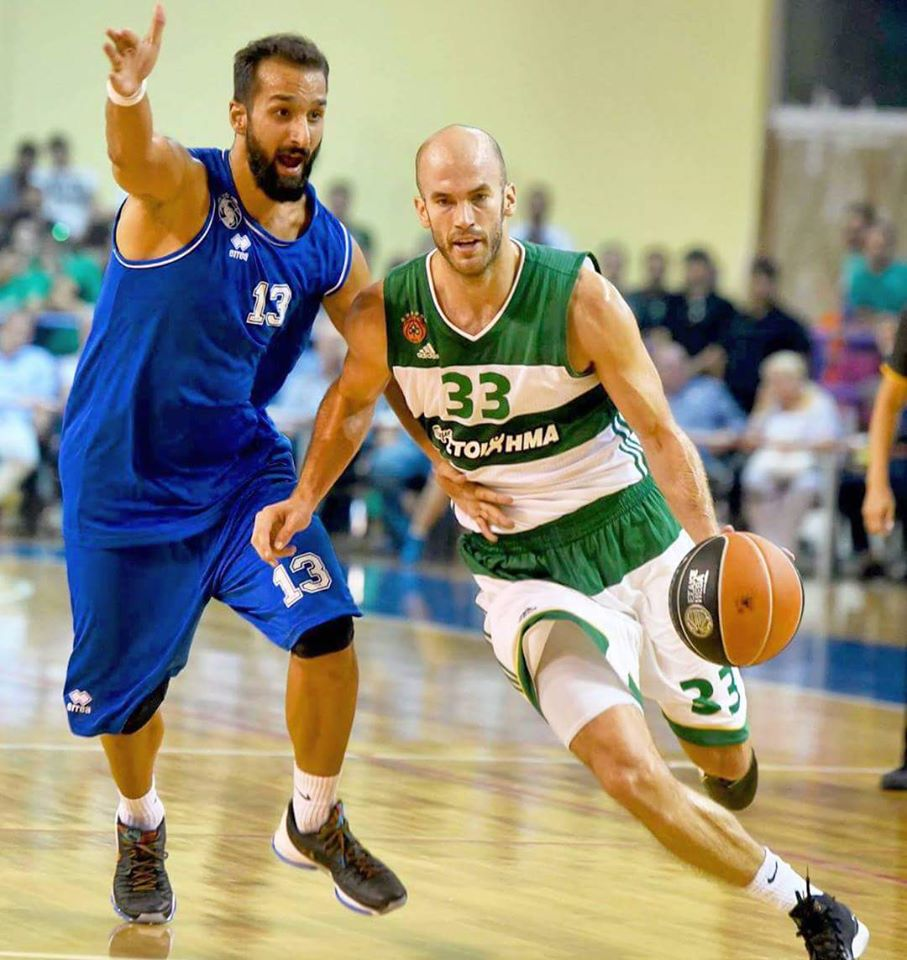
Nick Calathes (right)

On 30 June 2015, Sasha Đjorđjević was announced as the club's new head coach. That same summer, Panathinaikos signed Greek point guard Nick Calathes and Serbian center Miroslav Raduljica. The team's debut under the new leadership was promising, as Panathinaikos defeated Olympiacos away in the Greek Basketball Cup with a score of 64–70 on 8 October 2015. On 6 March 2016, they won the Greek Cup for a record 17th time (and fifth consecutive season), defeating Faros Keratsiniou 101–52.

On 19 April 2016, Sasha Đjorđjević was replaced by Argyris Pedoulakis, who returned as head coach. Nevertheless, Panathinaikos lost to Olympiacos in the Greek League Finals 1–3.

Following the retirement of Dimitris Diamantidis, the club increased its budget to sign new key players, including Mike James, K.C. Rivers, Chris Singleton, and Ioannis Bourousis. During this period, Panathinaikos also secured significant sponsorship deals, most notably with OPAP, Greece's largest betting company. The appointment of Xavi Pascual as head coach marked the beginning of a new era for the team.

In the 2016–17 and 2017–18 seasons, under Pascual, Panathinaikos won two consecutive Greek League Championships against Olympiacos and the 2017 Greek Basketball Cup against Aris. They also reached the EuroLeague playoffs both years, facing the eventual champions (Fenerbahçe in 2017 and Real Madrid in 2018), but were eliminated before the Final Four.

In the 2017 Greek League Finals, Panathinaikos defeated Olympiacos 3–2, winning the decisive game away to secure their first league title in two years. The following season, Panathinaikos became the only team in Europe to complete their domestic regular season undefeated, later winning the Finals once again over Olympiacos 3–2.

Despite the challenges that followed Obradović's departure and the fluctuations in the club's finances, Panathinaikos remains the only European basketball team to have won at least one title every season for 27 consecutive years, since 1996.

=== Rick Pitino era (2018–2020) ===
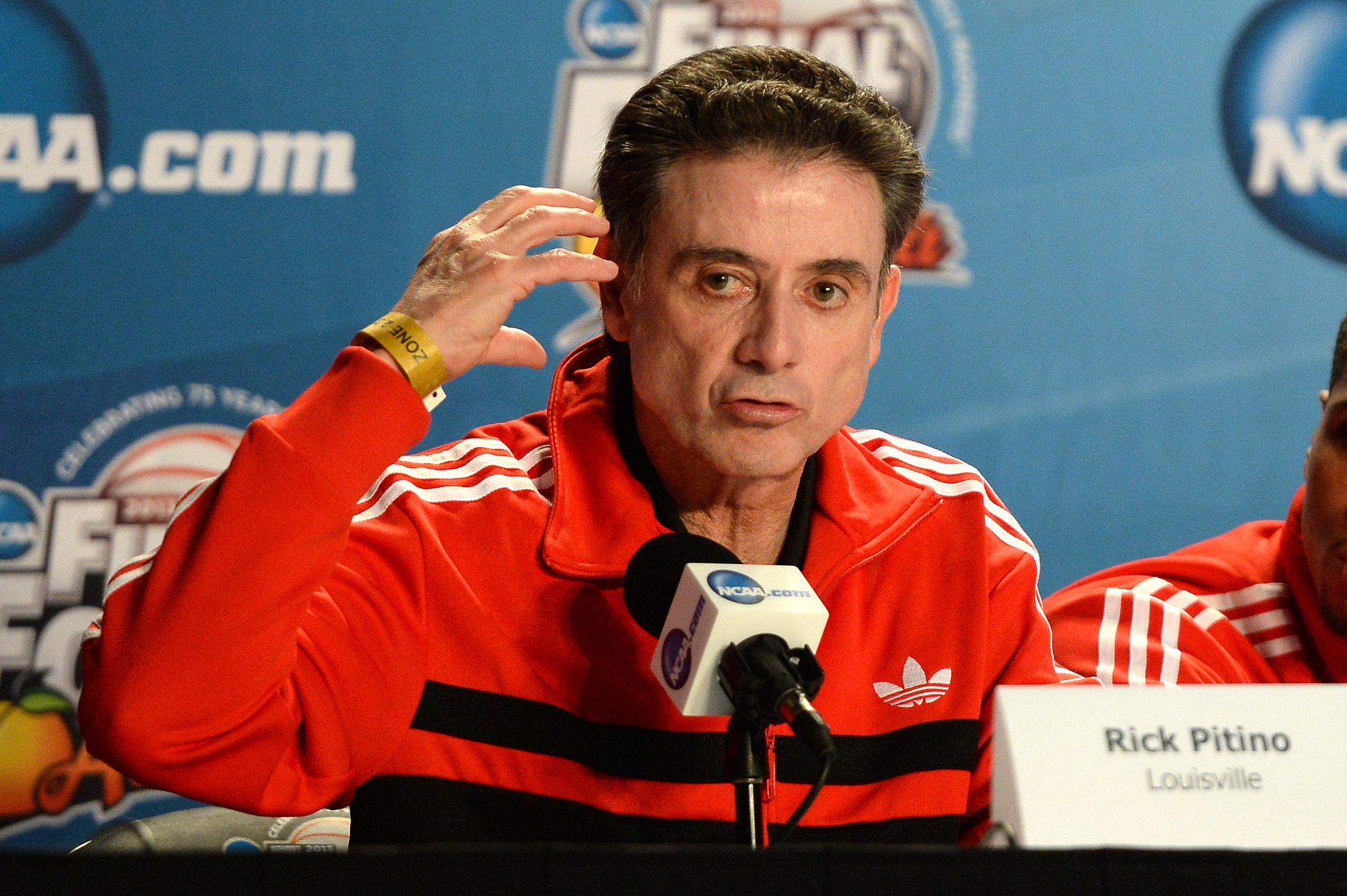
Rick Pitino

After two and a half seasons, Panathinaikos parted ways with coach Xavi Pascual on 20 December 2018. Pascual paid the price for the team's poor performance and losing streak during the 2018–19 EuroLeague. Georgios Vovoras served as Panathinaikos' interim head coach for the second time in his career, as the club reached an agreement with Hall of Famer Rick Pitino to become the team's new head coach until the end of the 2018–19 season.

Under coach Pitino, Panathinaikos transformed into a stronger team, making an impressive comeback in the EuroLeague, finishing sixth and reaching the playoffs. There, they faced defending champions Real Madrid and were eliminated before the Final Four. The season ended successfully, with Panathinaikos winning both the Greek Cup—defeating PAOK in the final—and the Greek Basket League Championship, sweeping Promitheas Patras 3–0 in the finals.

Panathinaikos offered Pitino a contract for the following season, and although he was willing to stay in Greece, family matters required him to return home. On 24 June 2019, Panathinaikos signed a two-year contract with Greek coach Argyris Pedoulakis, marking his third stint as the team's head coach in seven years. Pedoulakis's third stint ended on 15 November 2019, when Panathinaikos dismissed him after poor EuroLeague performance and elimination from the Greek Cup. Georgios Vovoras once again served as interim head coach.

On 26 November 2019, Rick Pitino officially returned to Panathinaikos, having resolved the family matter that had kept him away, and signed a one-and-a-half-year contract to serve as the team's head coach until summer 2021. However, on 20 March 2020, Panathinaikos and Pitino mutually agreed to end their cooperation due to the coronavirus pandemic, which forced the suspension of play in both the EuroLeague and Greek Basket League. Pitino returned to his family in the United States and later became the head coach of the Iona College team. Once again, Georgios Vovoras served as interim head coach for the fourth time.

=== Giannakopoulos step down & new team management (2020–2023) ===
In the summer of 2020, Panathinaikos went through major changes. On 10 June, the owner of the team, Dimitris Giannakopoulos, held a press conference where he announced that he would no longer be involved with Panathinaikos and that the club was up for sale for a price of 25 million euros. As a result, a new and unusual era began for the Greens, meaning that the team had to be rebuilt and operated based on the balance sheet, and that players with large contracts could not stay with the club at the time. Many players had to leave the team, including long-time club captain Nick Calathes. Also, long-time Panathinaikos member in various roles, Manos Papadopoulos, who had been very close to the Giannakopoulos family for over 30 years, left the Greens to join Zenit Saint Petersburg as the club's sports director.

On 26 June 2020, Panathinaikos announced that the club's sports management would be represented by the team's legends and former players Dimitris Diamantidis and Fragiskos Alvertis, alongside former CEO Takis Triantopoulos. Meanwhile, George Vovoras was named head coach for the challenging upcoming season. After almost seven months, and due to the team's poor performance, Panathinaikos and coach Vovoras parted ways on 4 January 2021. Kostas Charalampidis served as interim coach for a few days, until 14 January 2021, when Panathinaikos announced Oded Kattash as the club's new head coach on a one-and-a-half-year contract. With coach Kattash, Panathinaikos managed to win both the 2020–21 Greek Basket League and 2020–21 Greek Cup. However, on 24 June 2021, the team parted ways with him. Two days later, on 26 June 2021, Panathinaikos appointed Dimitris Priftis as their new head coach on a three-year deal. Priftis was no stranger to the team, having served as an assistant coach in 2014 under then head coach Fragiskos Alvertis.

On 12 April 2022, after a home defeat in a Greek Basket League regular season game against Olympiacos, in an unexpected turn of events, coach Priftis, general managers Diamantidis and Alvertis, and technical director Nikos Pappas were all fired by Panathinaikos, while president Panagiotis Triantopoulos resigned. Fragiskos Alvertis was given the option to stay with the club as team manager, but he declined, leaving Panathinaikos for the first time in his life after 32 years with the club. Former Panathinaikos coach Argyris Pedoulakis was immediately appointed as the team's new technical director, responsible for the team and the hiring of a new coach. On 14 April 2022, Panathinaikos announced the return of head coach George Vovoras for the remainder of the season, with former Lavrio B.C. head coach Christos Serelis joining as his assistant. According to the team's official press release, the massive changes were due to the failure to "create a basic core of athletes and build a team for today and especially for tomorrow," as well as economic challenges based on maintaining a balanced budget.

Although Dimitris Giannakopoulos announced his comeback to Panathinaikos in June 2022, the 2022–23 budget was still based on the balance sheet. The season ended as an absolute failure, after the team did not manage to win a title for the first time in 27 years. Therefore, that summer the balance sheet plan was waived and Giannakopoulos decided to spend enough money to make Panathinaikos dominant again.

=== Giannakopoulos actual comeback, Ergin Ataman era and the 7th EuroLeague title (2023–2026) ===
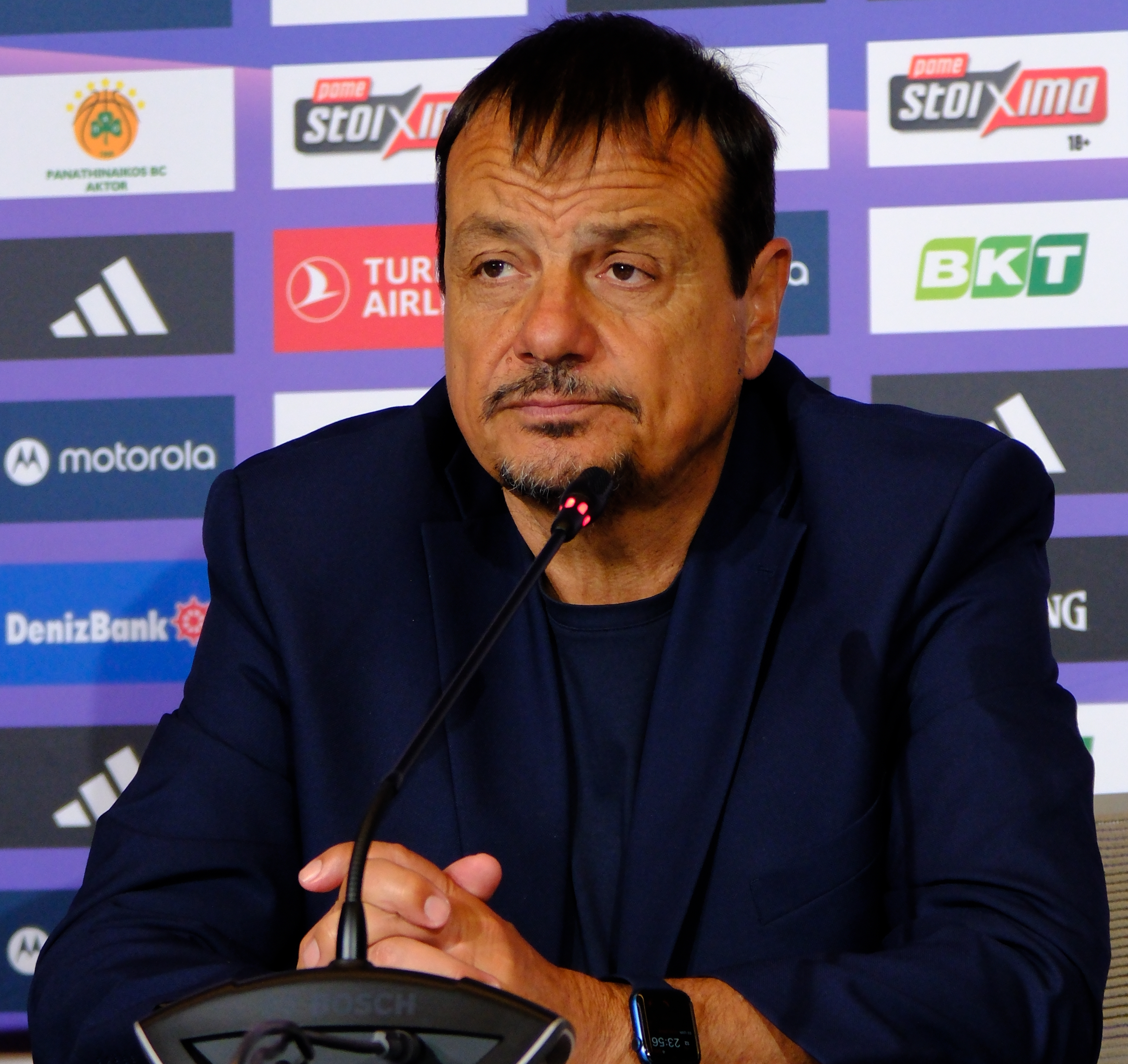
Ergin Ataman

The 2023–24 season started with Panathinaikos appointing Ergin Ataman as its new coach for two years. The deal was made official on 20 June 2023. Following this, Panathinaikos signed Kostas Sloukas, who instantly became the captain of the team after leaving Olympiacos. They also signed Juancho Hernangomez, Mathias Lessort, Ioannis Papapetrou, Jerian Grant, Konstantinos Mitoglou, Luca Vildoza, Kostas Antetokounmpo, Dimitris Moraitis, Olek Balcerowski, and, a few months later, their upcoming top-scorer Kendrick Nunn.

In the 2023–24 EuroLeague, Panathinaikos finished second in the regular season and returned to the playoffs after a five-year absence. In the playoffs, Panathinaikos beat Maccabi Tel Aviv, winning the quarterfinal series 3–2. They qualified for the EuroLeague Final Four. where the Greens defeated Fenerbahçe in the semifinal. They then blew out Real Madrid in the final, claiming their seventh EuroLeague title. Kostas Sloukas was crowned MVP of the Final Four.

About a month later, Panathinaikos also won the 2023–24 Greek Basket League. They beat Olympiacos 3–2 in the finals, coming back from a 0–2 deficit in the first two games. Kostas Sloukas was again named MVP of the finals.

Although the 2024–25 season wasn't as successful as the previous one as the team was riddled with key player serious injuries such as Mathias Lessort, the team still finished the Greek League regular season undefeated. Panathinaikos also won the Greek Cup on 16 February 2025 defeating again their rival Olympiacos in the final. At the end of the game, Kostas Sloukas was once more named MVP of the final.

In the 2024–25 EuroLeague, Panathinaikos finished the regular season in third place and qualified for the playoffs. Kendrick Nunn won both the EuroLeague MVP and the Alphonso Ford EuroLeague Top Scorer Trophy. In the Euroleague playoffs, Panathinaikos beat Anadolu Efes 3–2 and qualified for the Final Four. At Abu Dhabi, where the Final Four took place, Panathinaikos faced Fenerbahçe in the semifinal. They lost to the eventual champions.

The 2025–26 season started with high hopes for Panathinaikos following the signing of key additions such as T. J. Shorts, Richaun Holmes, and Nikos Rogkavopoulos.

The team did not compete in the 2025 Greek Basketball Super Cup due to the scheduling conflict with the Pavlos Giannakopoulos Tournament in Australia. The Hellenic Basketball Federation (E.O.K.) refused to adjust the date despite being aware of the tournament for months, and the club was fined €20,000.

The team quickly ran into significant depth issues in the frontcourt, as Mathias Lessort did not return from his previous injury and both Richaun Holmes and Ömer Yurtseven sustained injuries early in the season. To address the sudden shortage of centers while assessing the recovery timelines of the injured players, Panathinaikos signed Kenneth Faried to a two-month emergency contract. This measure allowed the team to stabilize the roster and maintain competitiveness during the early stages of the season while waiting for the potential return of the sidelined centers.

== Players ==
=== Current roster ===
Note: Flags indicate a player's nationality(ies), not just their eligibility to play for a national team at FIBA-sanctioned events. According to FIBA regulations, any player over the age of 17 who has played for a national team in an official FIBA competition cannot play for a national team of another country, save in exceptional cases.

Panathinaikos roster
Players
Coaches

Pos.	No.	Nat.	Name	Ht.	Wt.	Age
G	0	(Greece)	Kalaitzakis, Panagiotis	2.00 m (6 ft 7 in)	92 kg (203 lb)	27 – 2 January 1999
PG	3	(France)	Francisco, Sylvain	1.86 m (6 ft 1 in)	82 kg (181 lb)	29 – 10 October 1997
PG	6	(Greece)	Moraitis, Dimitrios	1.94 m (6 ft 4 in)	86 kg (190 lb)	27 – 3 February 1999
G	7	(Senegal)	Badio, Brancou	1.92 m (6 ft 4 in)	85 kg (187 lb)	27 – 17 February 1999
PG	10	(Greece)	Sloukas, Kostas (C)	1.92 m (6 ft 4 in)	87 kg (192 lb)	36 – 15 January 1990
F	11	(United States)	Hayes-Davis, Nigel	2.03 m (6 ft 8 in)	115 kg (254 lb)	31 – 16 December 1994
G	12	(Greece)	Varvaritis, Iason	2.02 m (6 ft 8 in)	85 kg (187 lb)	16 – 1 May 2010
G/F	17	(Greece)	Rogkavopoulos, Nikos	2.03 m (6 ft 8 in)	91 kg (201 lb)	25 – 27 June 2001
G	22	(United States)	Grant, Jerian	1.95 m (6 ft 5 in)	90 kg (198 lb)	34 – 9 October 1992
F	24	(Greece)	Kouzeloglou, Ioannis	2.07 m (6 ft 9 in)	95 kg (209 lb)	31 – 1 April 1995
G	25	(United States)	Nunn, Kendrick	1.91 m (6 ft 3 in)	86 kg (190 lb)	31 – 3 August 1995
F/C	26	(France)	Lessort, Mathias	2.06 m (6 ft 9 in)	112 kg (247 lb)	31 – 29 September 1995
F	28	(France)	Yabusele, Guerschon	2.03 m (6 ft 8 in)	120 kg (265 lb)	30 – 17 December 1995
F	32	(Germany)	Bonga, Isaac	2.06 m (6 ft 9 in)	82 kg (181 lb)	27 – 8 November 1999
F	41	(Spain)	Hernangómez, Juancho	2.06 m (6 ft 9 in)	97 kg (214 lb)	31 – 28 September 1995
F/C	44	(Greece)	Mitoglou, Dinos	2.10 m (6 ft 11 in)	116 kg (256 lb)	30 – 11 June 1996
F	72	(Greece)	Mantzoukas, Lefteris (injured)	2.07 m (6 ft 9 in)	100 kg (220 lb)	23 – 8 July 2003
C	93	(France)	Fall, Moustapha	2.21 m (7 ft 3 in)	124 kg (273 lb)	34 – 23 February 1992

Head coach

- (Serbia) Željko Obradović

Assistant coach(es)

- (United States) Mike Batiste
- (Spain) Josep Maria Izquierdo
- (Serbia) Vladimir Androić
- (Greece) Vassilis Symtsak
- (Greece) Savvas Kamperidis

Athletic trainer(s)

- (Greece) Dimitris Paspalas
- (Greece) Giorgos Papoulias

Team manager

- (Greece) Giorgos Gkotzogiannis

Head of operations

- (Greece) Savvas Aronis

Legend

- (C) Team captain
- Injured

- Roster
Updated: November 17, 2026

=== EuroLeague depth chart ===
Pos.	Starting 5	Bench 1	Bench 2	Bench 3	Inactive
C	Mathias Lessort	Dinos Mitoglou		Moustapha Fall
PF	Guerschon Yabusele	Juancho Hernangómez		Ioannis Kouzeloglou
SF	Nigel Hayes-Davis	Isaac Bonga	Nikos Rogkavopoulos	Iason Varvaritis	Lefteris Mantzoukas (injured)
SG	Kendrick Nunn	Brancou Badio	Panagiotis Kalaitzakis	Dimitrios Moraitis
PG	Sylvain Francisco	Kostas Sloukas		Jerian Grant

=== GBL depth chart ===
Pos.	Starting 5	Bench 1	Bench 2	Bench 3	Inactive
C	Dinos Mitoglou	Mathias Lessort *	Ioannis Kouzeloglou		Moustapha Fall *
PF	Guerschon Yabusele *	Isaac Bonga *		Juancho Hernangómez *
SF	Nigel Hayes-Davis *	Brancou Badio *	Nikos Rogkavopoulos	Iason Varvaritis	Lefteris Mantzoukas (injured)
SG	Panagiotis Kalaitzakis	Kendrick Nunn *			Jerian Grant *
PG	Kostas Sloukas	Dimitrios Moraitis		Sylvain Francisco *

- GBL requires a maximum of 8 active foreigners in a team's roster, while 6 of them can be on a 12-men game sheet. Foreign players are shown with an asterisk (*).

=== Retired numbers ===
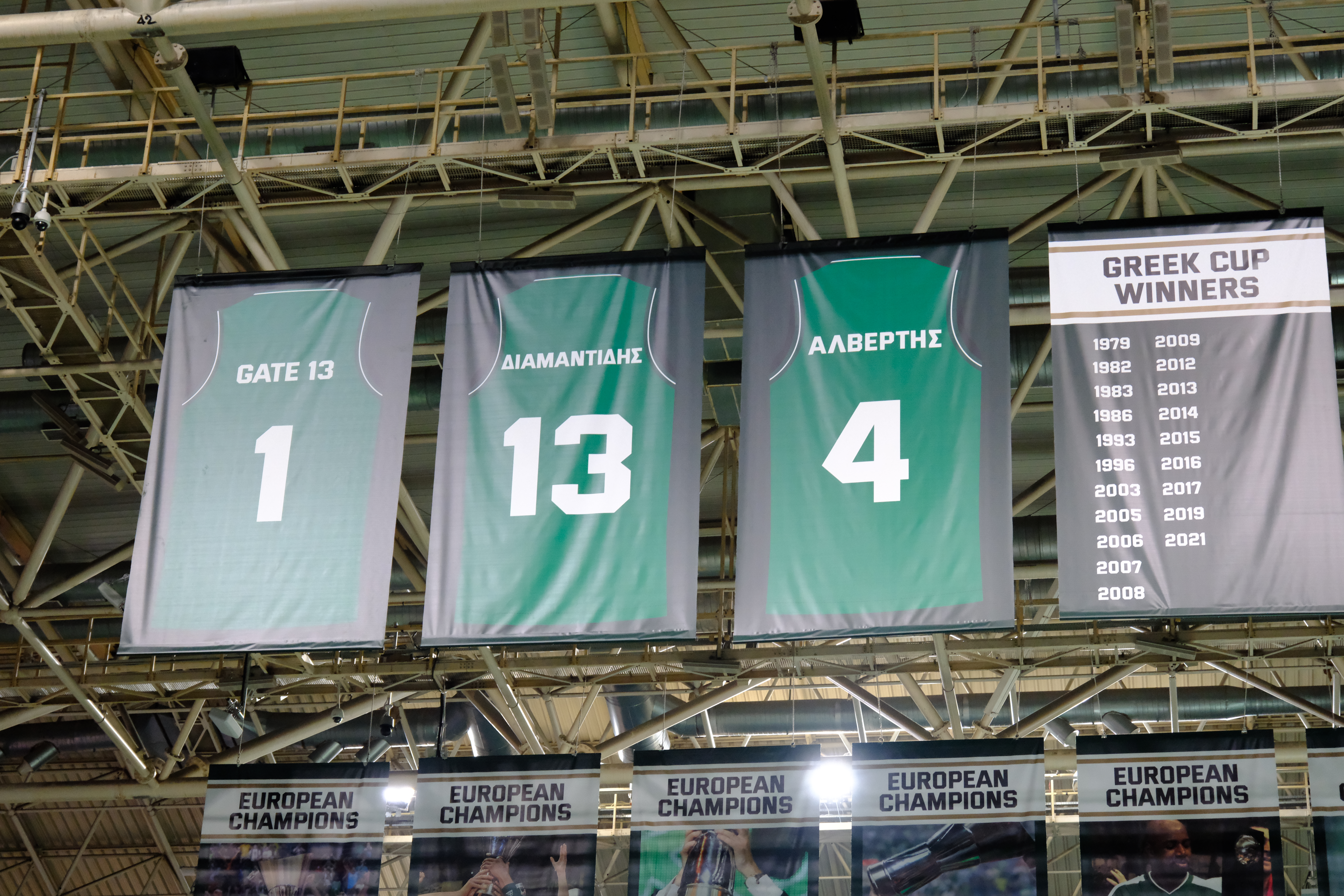
Retired numbers in the rafters of the Telekom Center Athens

Panathinaikos retired numbers
No	Nat.	Player	Position	Tenure	Date retired
1	N/A	Dedicated to the supporters and the oldest fan club (Gate 13)	N/A		
4	(Greece)	Fragiskos Alvertis	SF	1990–2009	October 11, 2009
13	(Greece)	Dimitris Diamantidis	PG	2004–2016	September 17, 2016

== Squad changes for the 2026–27 season ==
=== In ===
Date	Pos.	Name	From
June 24, 2026	C	(France) Moustapha Fall	(Greece) Olympiacos
July 8, 2026	PF/C	(France) Guerschon Yabusele	(United States) Chicago Bulls
July 9, 2026	SG	(Senegal) Brancou Badio	(Spain) Valencia
July 10, 2026	SF/PF	(Germany) Isaac Bonga	(Serbia) Partizan
July 17, 2026	PG/SG	(Greece) Dimitrios Moraitis	(Greece) Iraklis (end of loan)
July 17, 2026	PF/SF	(Greece) Lefteris Mantzoukas	(United States) Oklahoma State Cowboys
July 30, 2026	PG	(France) Sylvain Francisco	(Lithuania) Zalgiris Kaunas

=== Out ===
Date	Pos.	Name	To
June 20, 2026	SG/SF	(Lithuania) Marius Grigonis	(Lithuania) Žalgiris Kaunas
June 21, 2026	C	(United States) Kenneth Faried	(Puerto Rico) Cangrejeros de Santurce
June 23, 2026	PG	(United States) (North Macedonia) T. J. Shorts	(Spain) Valencia
July 6, 2026	PF	(Greece) Alexandros Samodurov	(United States) North Carolina Tar Heels
July 20, 2026	SF	(Turkey) Cedi Osman	(Greece) PAOK Thessaloniki
July 24, 2026	SG/PG	(Greece) Vassilis Toliopoulos	(Greece) Aris Thessaloniki

== Honours and other achievements ==
Panathinaikos is the most successful basketball club in Greece and one of the most accomplished in Europe. The club has won numerous domestic and international titles, including several EuroLeague championships and multiple Greek League and Cup doubles.

Honours
Type	Competition	Titles	Seasons
International	EuroLeague	7	1995–96, 1999–00, 2001–02, 2006–07, 2008–09, 2010–11, 2023–24
International	Intercontinental Cup	1	1996
Domestic	Greek League	40	1945–46, 1946–47, 1949–50, 1950–51, 1953–54, 1960–61, 1961–62, 1966–67, 1968–69, 1970–71, 1971–72, 1972–73, 1973–74, 1974–75, 1976–77, 1979–80, 1980–81, 1981–82, 1983–84, 1997–98, 1998–99, 1999–00, 2000–01, 2002–03, 2003–04, 2004–05, 2005–06, 2006–07, 2007–08, 2008–09, 2009–10, 2010–11, 2012–13, 2013–14, 2016–17, 2017–18, 2018–19, 2019–20, 2020–21, 2023–24
Domestic	Greek Cup	22	1978–79, 1981–82, 1982–83, 1985–86, 1992–93, 1995–96, 2002–03, 2004–05, 2005–06, 2006–07, 2007–08, 2008–09, 2011–12, 2012–13, 2013–14, 2014–15, 2015–16, 2016–17, 2018–19, 2020–21, 2024–25, 2025–26
Domestic	Greek Super Cup	1	2021

- Record title holders

=== Domestic competitions ===
- Greek League

Winners (40) (record): 1945–46, 1946–47, 1949–50, 1950–51, 1953–54, 1960–61, 1961–62, 1966–67, 1968–69, 1970–71, 1971–72, 1972–73, 1973–74, 1974–75, 1976–77, 1979–80, 1980–81, 1981–82, 1983–84, 1997–98, 1998–99, 1999–00, 2000–01, 2002–03, 2003–04, 2004–05, 2005–06, 2006–07, 2007–08, 2008–09, 2009–10, 2010–11, 2012–13, 2013–14, 2016–17, 2017–18, 2018–19, 2019–20, 2020–21, 2023–24
Runners-up (14): 1952–53, 1967–68, 1969–70, 1977–78, 1982–83, 1992–93, 1994–95, 1995–96, 2011–12, 2014–15, 2015–16, 2021–22, 2022–23, 2024–25, 2025–26

- Greek Cup

Winners (22) (record): 1978–79, 1981–82, 1982–83, 1985–86, 1992–93, 1995–96, 2002–03, 2004–05, 2005–06, 2006–07, 2007–08, 2008–09, 2011–12, 2012–13, 2013–14, 2014–15, 2015–16, 2016–17, 2018–19, 2020–21, 2024–25, 2025–26
Runners-up (6): 1984–85, 1999–00, 2000–01, 2009–10, 2010–11, 2021–22, 2023–24

- Greek Super Cup

Winners (1): 2021
Runners-up (3): 2022, 2023, 2024

=== European competitions ===
- EuroLeague

Winners (7): 1995–96, 1999–00, 2001–02, 2006–07, 2008–09, 2010–11, 2023–24
Runners-up (1): 2000–01
Semifinalists (1): 1971–72
3rd place (3): 1993–94, 1994–95, 2004–05
4th place (2): 2011–12, 2024-25
Final Four (13): 1994, 1995, 1996, 2000, 2001, 2002, 2005, 2007, 2009, 2011, 2012, 2024, 2025

- FIBA Saporta Cup (defunct)

Semifinalists (2): 1968–69, 1997–98

=== Worldwide competitions ===
- FIBA Intercontinental Cup

Winners (1): 1996

=== Other competitions ===
- FIBA International Christmas Tournament (defunct)

Winners (1): 1999

- Athens, Greece Invitational Game

Winners (1): 2007

- Valjevo, Serbia Tournament

Winners (1): 2008

- Gomelsky Cup

Winners (1): 2009
Runners-up (4): 2008, 2011, 2014, 2015

- Kruševac, Serbia Invitational Game

Winners (1): 2009

- Užice, Serbia Invitational Game

Winners (1): 2010

- Kragujevac, Serbia Invitational Game

Winners (1): 2010

- Novi Sad, Serbia Invitational Game

Winners (1): 2011

- Crete, Greece Invitational Game

Winners (1): 2015

- Dimitris Diamantidis Tournament

Winners (1): 2016

- Pavlos Giannakopoulos Tournament

Winners (1): 2018

- Portaria-Makrinitsa, Greece Invitational Game

Winners (1): 2018

- Vilnius, Lithuania Invitational Game

Winners (1): 2020

=== Individual club awards ===
- Triple Crown

Winners (2): 2006–07, 2008–09

- Double

Winners (11) (record): 1981–82, 2002–03, 2004–05, 2005–06, 2006–07, 2007–08, 2008–09, 2012–13, 2013–14, 2016–17, 2018–19, 2020–2021

== Crest and colours ==
The trifolium is the emblem of the team, symbolizing harmony, unity, nature, and good luck. Since its foundation, the team's main colours have been green and white (green representing health and nature, such as physiolatry, and white representing virtue). Alternative colours also used include black, lime, dark blue or purple uniforms, and elements of golden yellow. Since 1992, the year in which the club's basketball department became professional, Panathinaikos B.C. has used its own logo.

=== Sponsors and manufacturers ===
Since 1982, Panathinaikos has maintained designated kit manufacturers and sponsors. The tables below list the shirt sponsors and kit suppliers by year:

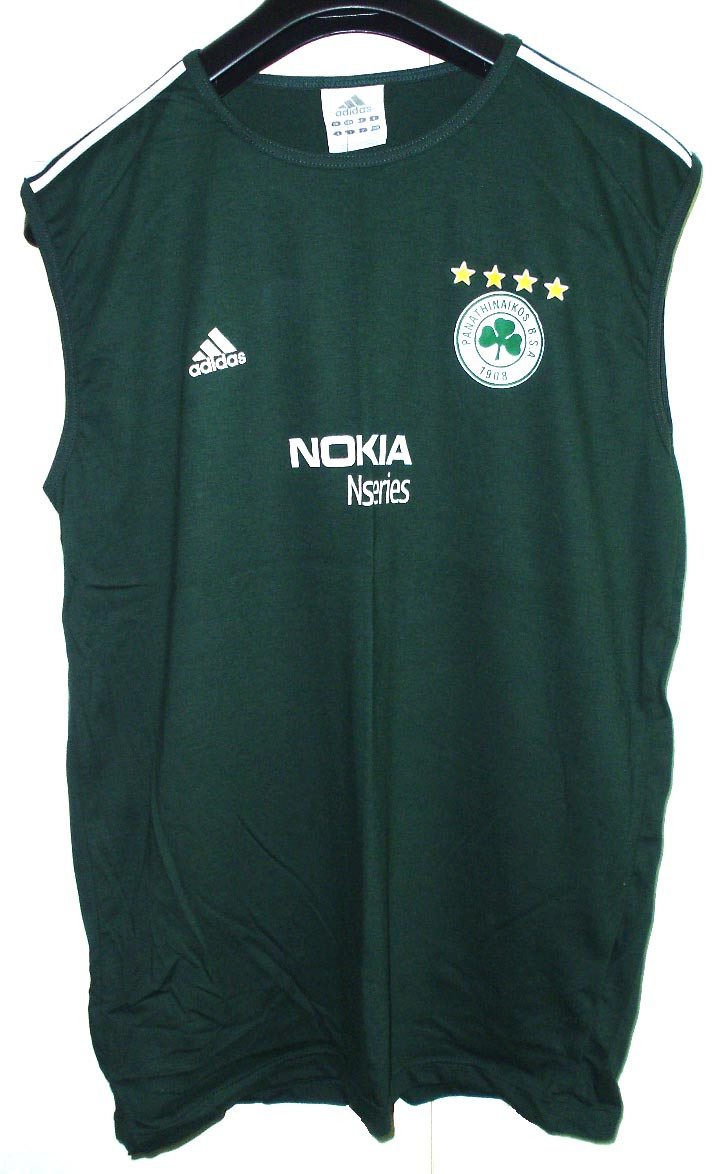
Panathinaikos BC training shirt (2008–09)

Period	Kit supplier	Shirt sponsor
1982–1986	Converse	Motor Oil
1986–1989	Nike	Motor Oil
1989–1992	Nike	None
1992–1993	Reebok	Maxwell House
1993–1994	Adidas	Maxwell House
1994–1996	Nike	Beck's
1996–1997	Pony	Dental V6
1997–1998	Pony	None
1998–1999	Nike	None
1999–2000	Nike	Bake Rolls
2000–2008	Adidas	Nokia Series
2008–2011	Adidas	Cosmote
2011–2014	Adidas	Pame Stoixima
2014–2016	Adidas	Stoiximan.gr
2016–present	Adidas	Pame Stoixima

=== Current sponsorships ===
- Title Sponsor: AKTOR
- Great Shirt Sponsor: Pame Stoixima
- Official Sport Clothing Manufacturer: Adidas
- Official Sponsor: Altion, Protergia, Cosmote, Avance Car Rental, Coca-Cola 3E, EZA, Electroholic, Aktina, Viva, BP, HEDNO, Molto, Lenovo, Nikas, Nestle, Matrix, The Mall Athens, Pizza Fun, Indiba
- Official Broadcaster: Cosmote TV
- Official Partner: Smartup, Direction Business Network, Leoforos.gr
- Official Health Care Service Provider: Hygeia Medical Center

=== Historical uniforms ===
1957–59	1970–75	1992–93	2007–11	2013 (A)	2014 (A)	2016–17 (A)	2016–17

== Arena ==
Panathinaikos' long-time home court is the Telekom Center Athens, which is the largest indoor venue in Greece. It is located in Marousi, and is a part of the Athens Olympic Sports Complex. Panathinaikos signed a concession contract with the Greek state in 2023 and thus became the venue's single operator for 49 years. The venue was inaugurated in 1995, was renovated for the 2004 Summer Olympics, and underwent a total makeover in 2024. It is considered to be one of the biggest and most modern indoor sports arenas in all of Europe. The seating capacity for basketball games is 18,300 however, the arena can hold up to a temporary capacity of 21,098.

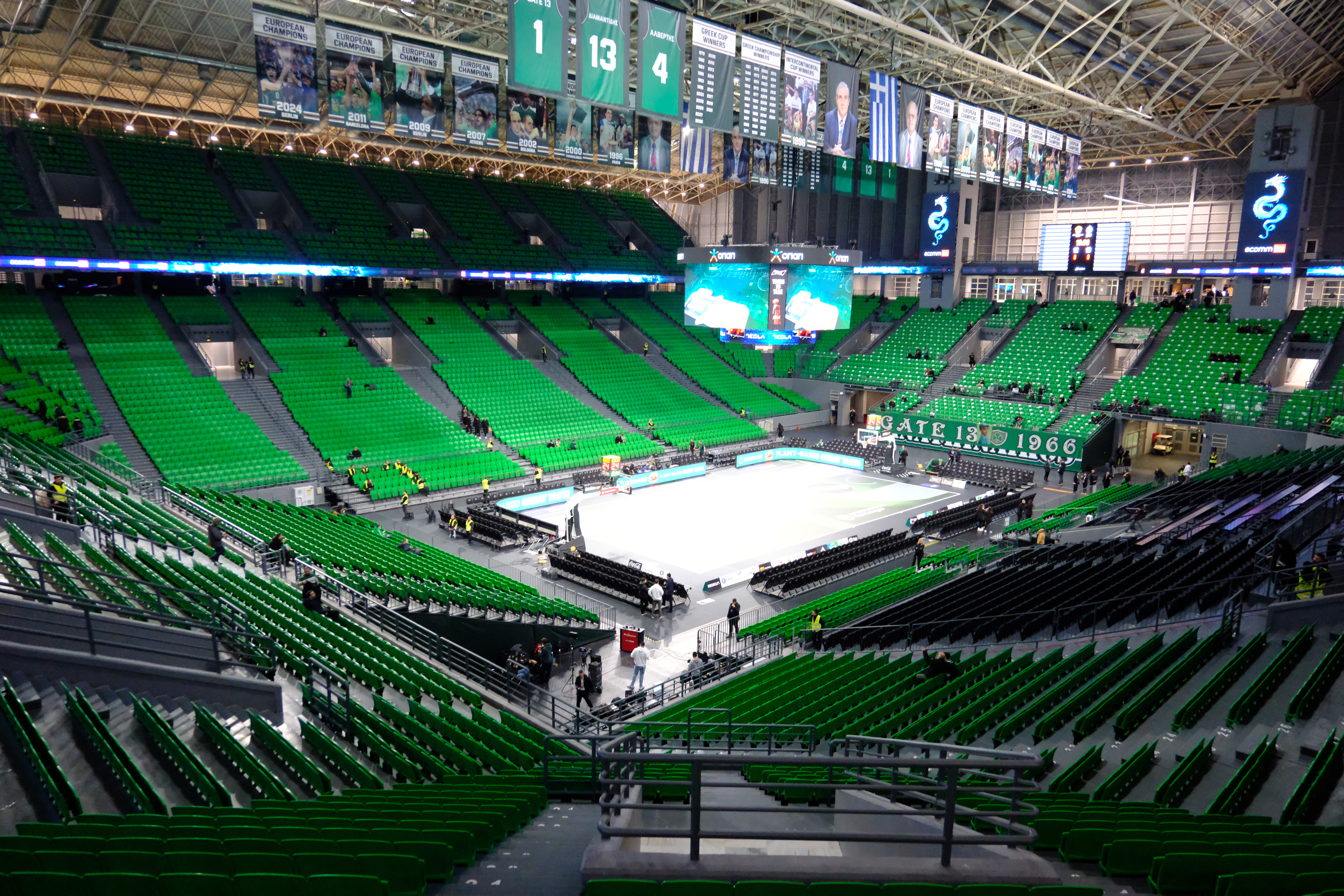
Internal view

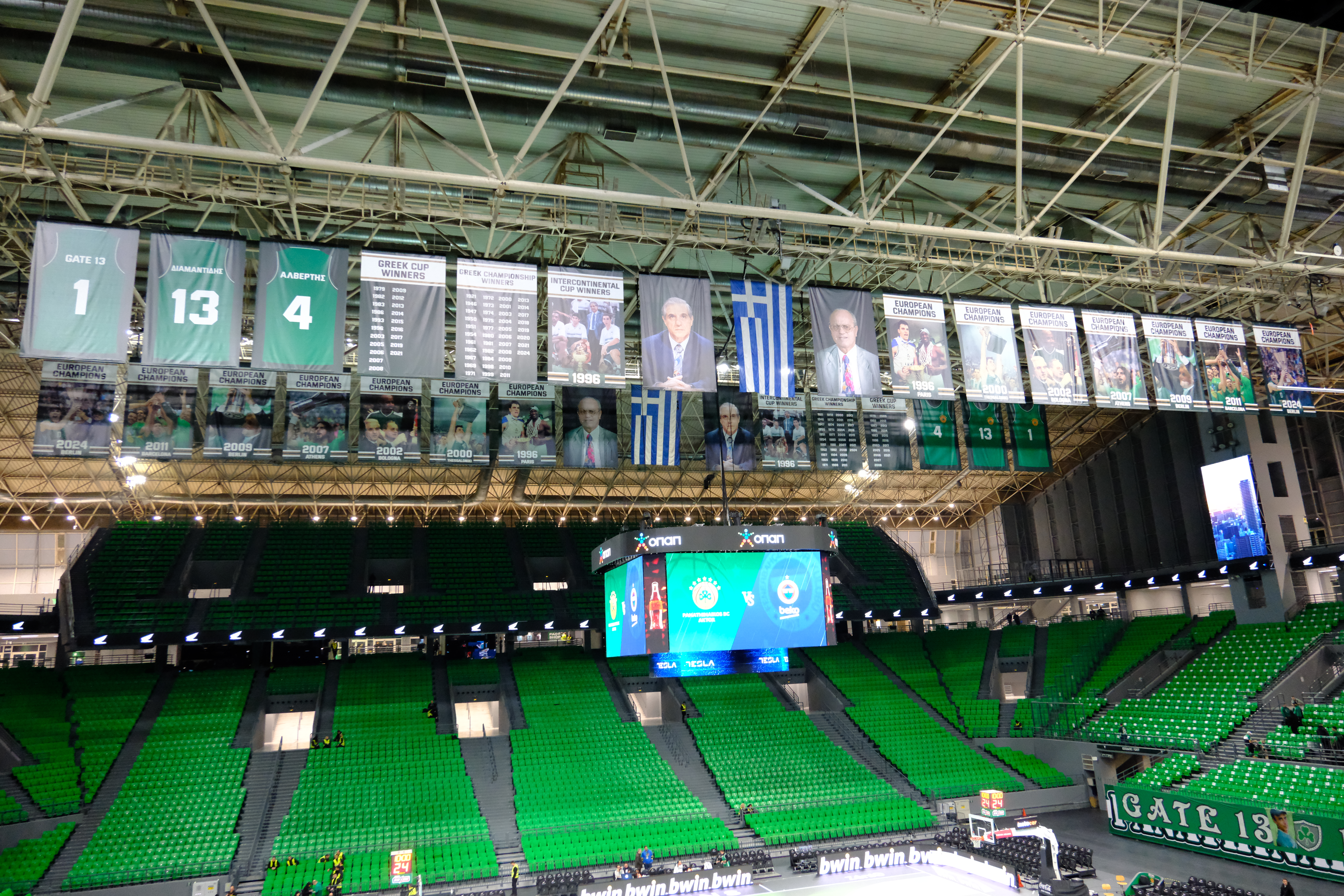
Banners of Panathinaikos

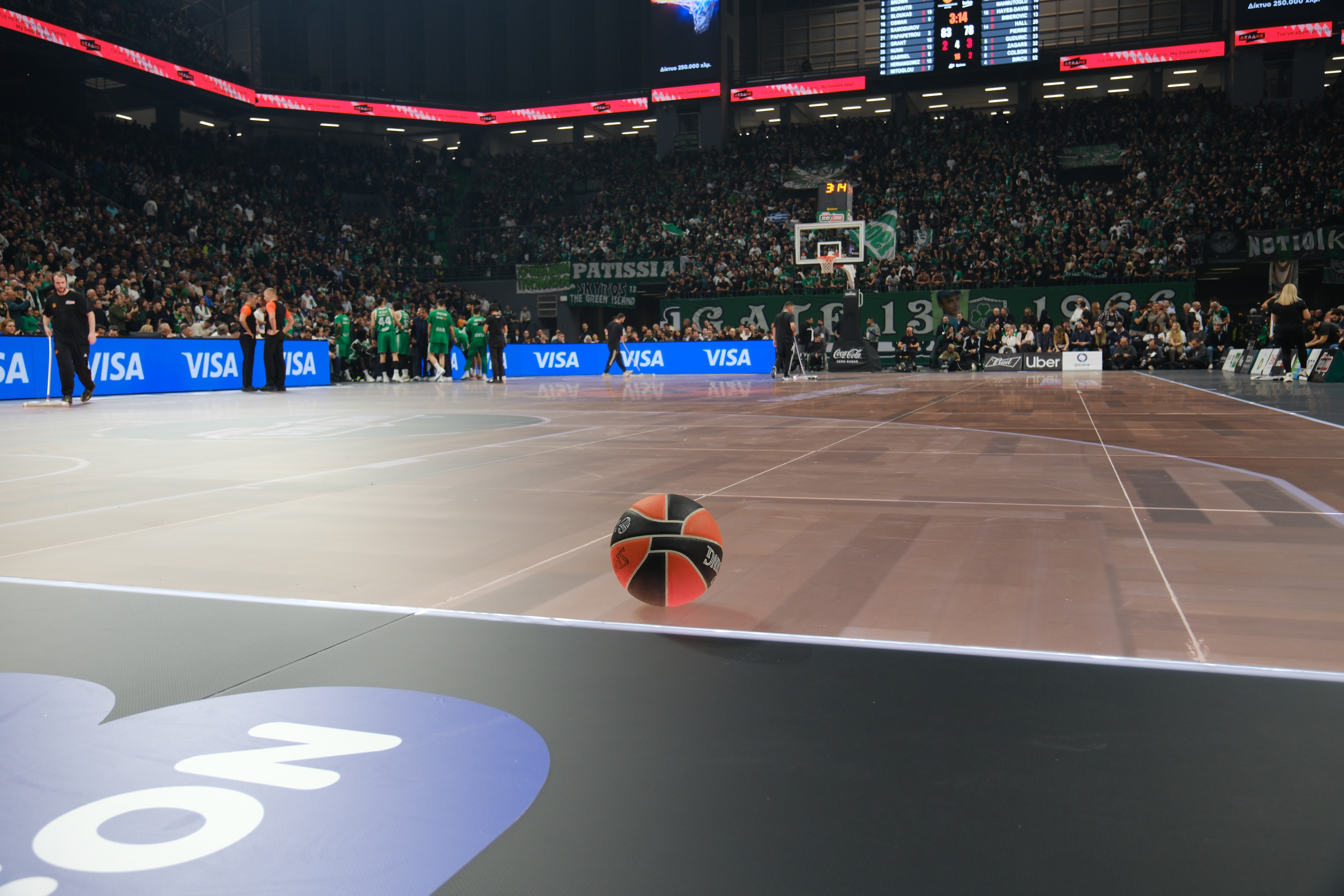
Glass floor

Outside view

== Supporters ==
Panathinaikos is renowned for its fans' passionate support. On 29 March 2006, during a home game at Telekom Center Athens against Benetton Treviso in the second phase of the 2005–06 EuroLeague, the team set a EuroLeague home attendance record of 20,000 fans.

This record was later broken on 5 March 2009 at another Panathinaikos game, this time as the away team against Partizan Belgrade at Belgrade Arena for the 2008–09 EuroLeague season, when 22,567 fans attended the arena. This remains the highest single game EuroLeague attendance recorded to date.

On 18 April 2013, during the 4th game of the 2012–13 EuroLeague Quarterfinals against FC Barcelona, it is estimated that 30,000 fans attended the game. However, the EuroLeague does not officially recognize this as the all-time attendance record, as the number of fans exceeded the arena's official seating capacity.

== Mascot ==
=== Mr. Green (2006–2021, 2023–present) ===
"Mr. Green" is the first official mascot of Panathinaikos B.C. Introduced in 2006, he is a green, muscular basketball player with a basketball for a head. He typically wears a jersey with the number "08," referencing 1908, the year Panathinaikos was founded. Creating Mr. Green took nearly a month, using materials commonly employed in Hollywood movie costumes, including those for Batman and Spider-Man.

He entertains fans during game breaks, gives away presents, and participates in various in-arena events. Mr. Green appears at every home game at Telekom Center Athens and takes part in social responsibility initiatives with children. He has also participated in six All-Star Games.

=== Green Kong (2021–2023) ===
On 18 September 2021, during the 2021–22 pre-season and the "3rd Pavlos Giannakopoulos Tournament," a new mascot named "Green Kong" was introduced: a grey-haired gorilla wearing a Panathinaikos jersey. Two years later, the team re-introduced the previous mascot, "Mr. Green."

== Rivalries ==
=== Olympiacos ===
Panathinaikos holds a major long-term rivalry with Olympiacos, and matches between the two teams are referred to as the "Derby of the Eternal Enemies." Panathinaikos is the most successful basketball club in Greece, with Olympiacos often finishing as runners-up. The two clubs are considered the most traditional powers in Greek basketball, having competed at the top level longer than any other teams.

Their rivalry intensified in the 1990s and 2000s, when they faced each other in numerous regular season and playoff series, as well as in several EuroLeague matches that became historic.

=== Minor rivalries ===
Panathinaikos previously held a minor rivalry with Aris, mostly during the 1980s, when the two clubs were the dominant forces in Greek basketball. They also have minor rivalries with AEK and PAOK, primarily driven by fanbase interactions rather than on-court competition. However, none of these rivalries compare to the intensity and significance of the one with Olympiacos.

== Seasons ==
Season	Greek League	Greek Cup	Europe	Head coach	Roster
1945–46	Champion	No tournament	No tournament	Missas Pantazopoulos	Giannis Lambrou, Missas Pantazopoulos, Stelios Arvanitis, Jack Nikolaidis, Giorgos Nikolaidis, Thymios Karadimos
1946–47	Champion	No tournament	No tournament	Missas Pantazopoulos	Giannis Lambrou, Missas Pantazopoulos, Stelios Arvanitis, Jack Nikolaidis, Giorgos Nikolaidis, Dimitrakopoulos
1948–49	4th place	No tournament	No tournament	Missas Pantazopoulos	Giannis Lambrou, Stelios Arvanitis, Missas Pantazopoulos, Nikos Milas, Petros Dimitropoulos, Alekos Karalis, Fanis Theofanis, Dimitrakopoulos
1949–50	Champion	No tournament	No tournament	Missas Pantazopoulos	Fedon Mattheou, Giannis Lambrou, Missas Pantazopoulos, Stelios Arvanitis, Nikos Milas, Petros Dimitropoulos, Alekos Karalis, Panos Koukopoulos, Thanasis Koukopoulos, Fanis Theofanis, Kaligeris, Vithipoulias, Papatheoharis, Giazimis, Genimatas
1950–51	Champion	No tournament	No tournament	Missas Pantazopoulos	Fedon Mattheou, Giannis Lambrou, Stelios Arvanitis, Nikos Milas, Giorgos Oven, Fanis Theofannis, Kaligeris, Papatheoharis, Tripos, Vithipoulias, Konidis, Filipou, Yiaximis, Genimatas
1952–53	2nd place	No tournament	No tournament		Fedon Mattheou, Giannis Lambrou, Stelios Arvanitis, Nikos Milas, Alekos Karalis, Panos Koukopoulos, Yiaximis, Konidis, Kaligeris, Eftaxias
1953–54	Champion	No tournament	No tournament		Fedon Mattheou, Stelios Arvanitis, Nikos Milas, Panos Koukopoulos, Stelios Tavoularis, Giorgos Oven, Alekos Karalis, Giannis Malakates, Yiaximis, Varias, Konidis, Yianopoulos, Stamatiou, Kimanis
1960–61	Champion	No tournament	No tournament	Nikos Milas	Panos Koukopoulos, Petros Panagiotarakos, Makridis, Liamis, Zanos, Koutsoukos, Tavoularis, Papakonstantopoulos, Mandilaris, Dedes, Katsikidis, Nakios, Sitzakis
1961–62	Champion	No tournament	Euroleague; Last 32	Kimonas Agathos	Petros Panagiotarakos, Giorgos Vassilakopoulos, Panos Koukopoulos, Liamis, Tavoularis, Katsikidis, Zanos, Makridis, Antoniadis, Mandilaris, Panagiotidis, Papadimitriou
1962–63	4th place	No tournament	Euroleague; Last 16	Panos Koukopoulos	Petros Panagiotarakos, Giorgos Vassilakopoulos, Kostas Politis, Panos Koukopoulos, Stelios Tavoularis, Liamis, Katsikidis, Zanis
1963–64	3rd place	No tournament	Not participated	Nikos Milas	Kostas Politis, Michalis Kyritsis, Petros Panagiotarakos, Giorgos Vassilakopoulos, Andreas Chaikalis, Gavrilos Antoniadis, Christos Antoniadis, Stelios Tavoularis, Kostas Politis, Papadimitriou
1964–65	6th place	No tournament	Not participated	Nikos Milas	Petros Panagiotarakos, Giorgos Vassilakopoulos, Kostas Politis, Michalis Kyritsis, Andreas Chaikalis, Christos Iordanidis
1965–66	3rd place	No tournament	Not participated	Mio Stefanović	Giorgos Kolokythas, Petros Panagiotarakos, Giorgos Vassilakopoulos, Kostas Politis, Michalis Kyritsis, Andreas Chaikalis, Christos Iordanidis
1966–67	Champion	No tournament	Not participated	Kostas Mourouzis	Giorgos Kolokythas, Kostas Politis, Giorgos Vassilakopoulos, Michalis Kyritsis, Petros Panagiotarakos, Thanasis Peppas, Andreas Chaikalis, Kouzoupis, Liamis, Lekkakis, Stefanou
1967–68	2nd place	No tournament	Euroleague; Last 16	Kostas Mourouzis	Giorgos Kolokythas, Kostas Politis, Petros Panagiotarakos, Thanasis Peppas, Andreas Haikalis, Michalis Kyritsis
1968–69	Champion	No tournament	Cup Winners' Cup; Last 4	Kostas Mourouzis	Giorgos Kolokythas, Kostas Politis, Christos Iordanidis, Petros Panagiotarakos, Thanasis Peppas, Andreas Haikalis, Craig Greenwood, Michalis Kyritsis
1969–70	2nd place	No tournament	Euroleague; Last 16	Kostas Mourouzis	Apostolos Kontos, Giorgos Kolokythas, Dimitris Kokolakis, Christos Iordanidis, Christos Kefalos, Kostas Politis, Haris Papazoglou, Petros Panagiotarakos, Thanasis Peppas, Andreas Haikalis, Andreas Papantoniou, Michalis Kyritsis
1970–71	Champion	No tournament	Cup Winners' Cup; Last 16	Kostas Mourouzis	Giorgos Kolokythas, Christos Iordanidis, Kostas Politis, Petros Panagiotarakos, Thanasis Peppas, Andreas Haikalis, Michalis Kyritsis, Charis Papazoglou, Christos Kefalos
1971–72	Champion	No tournament	Euroleague; Last 4	Kostas Mourouzis	Apostolos Kontos, Dimitris Kokolakis, Takis Koroneos, Christos Kefalos, Christos Iordanidis, Michalis Kyritsis, Giannis Dimaras, Charis Papazoglou, Andreas Papantoniou, Petros Panagiotarakos, Thanasis Peppas, Andreas Haikalis, Zografos, Zegleris, Paraskevas, Willy Kirkland
1972–73	Champion	No tournament	Euroleague; Last 32	Kostas Mourouzis	Apostolos Kontos, Dimitris Kokolakis, Takis Koroneos, Christos Iordanidis, Christos Kefalos, Andreas Papantoniou, Giannis Dimaras, Andreas Haikalis, Charis Papazoglou, Sigas, Houseas, Broutsos, Bogdanos, Poulidis, Michelis
1973–74	Champion	No tournament	Euroleague; Last 16	Kostas Mourouzis	Apostolos Kontos, Dimitris Kokolakis, Christos Iordanidis, Christos Kefalos, Charis Papazoglou, Andreas Haikalis, Andreas Papantoniou, Giannis Dimaras, Houseas, Poulidis, Koumanakos, Bogdanos
1974–75	Champion	No tournament	Euroleague; Last 16	Richard Dukeshire	Apostolos Kontos, Dimitris Kokolakis, Takis Koroneos, Christos Iordanidis, Christos Kefalos, Memos Ioannou, Kostas Batis, Charis Papazoglou, Andreas Papantoniou, S. Kontos, Kabourakis, Spiliopoulos
1975–76	3rd place	Last 4	Euroleague; Last 16	Nikos Milas	Apostolos Kontos, Dimitris Kokolakis, Takis Koroneos, Christos Iordanidis, Christos Kefalos, Memos Ioannou, Kostas Batis, Charis Papazoglou, Andreas Papantoniou, Andreas Haikalis, Kampourakis, S. Kontos
1976–77	Champion	Last 4	Korać Cup; Last 27	Kostas Anastasatos	Apostolos Kontos, Dimitris Kokolakis, Takis Koroneos, Christos Kefalos, Memos Ioannou, Kostas Batis, Andreas Papantoniou, Charis Papazoglou, S. Kontos, Kakogeorgiou, Kabourakis, Petrakakis
1977–78	2nd place	Last 4	Euroleague; Last 18	Kostas Anastasatos, Michalis Kyritsis	Apostolos Kontos, Dimitris Kokolakis, Takis Koroneos, Christos Iordanidis, Memos Ioannou, Christos Kefalos, Kostas Batis, Andreas Papantoniou, Charis Papazoglou
1978–79	3rd place	Winners	Korać Cup; Last 16	Michalis Kyritsis, Kostas Politis	Apostolos Kontos, Dimitris Kokolakis, Takis Koroneos, David Stergakos, Kostas Batis, Andreas Papantoniou, Charis Papazoglou, Christos Kefalos
1979–80	Champion	Last 8	Cup Winners' Cup; Last 8	Kostas Politis	Apostolos Kontos, Dimitris Kokolakis, Takis Koroneos, David Stergakos, Memos Ioannou, Kyriakos Vidas, Kostas Batis, Andreas Papantoniou, Charis Papazoglou, Garos, Georganas, Kalogeropoulos
1980–81	Champion	Last 8	Euroleague; Last 8	Kostas Politis	Apostolos Kontos, Dimitris Kokolakis, Takis Koroneos, David Stergakos, Kyriakos Vidas, Memos Ioannou, Andreas Papantoniou, Katsinis, Garos, Georganas, Kalogeropoulos, Metaxas
1981–82	Champion	Winners	Euroleague; Final-6	Kostas Politis	Apostolos Kontos, Dimitris Kokolakis, Takis Koroneos, David Stergakos, Kyriakos Vidas, Memos Ioannou, Kostas Batis, Andreas Papantoniou, Kim Woolfolk, David Thompson, Katsinis, Georganas, Venieris, Kalogeropoulos, Garos, Karanasos
1982–83	3rd place	Winners	Euroleague; Last 5	Christos Kefalos	Dimitris Kokolakis, Takis Koroneos, David Stergakos, Liveris Andritsos, Memos Ioannou, Tom Kappos
1983–84	Champion	Last 4	Cup Winners' Cup; Last 8	Michalis Kyritsis	Takis Koroneos, David Stergakos, Memos Ioannou, Liveris Andritsos, Kyriakos Vidas, Giorgos Skropolithas, Tom Kappos, Tolias, Kalogeropoulos, Politis, Tsantilis, Sotiriou
1984–85	3rd place	Finalist	Euroleague; Last 8	Michalis Kyritsis	Takis Koroneos, David Stergakos, Liveris Andritsos, Kyriakos Vidas, Memos Ioannou, Giorgos Skropolithas, Tom Kappos, Tolias, Kalogeropoulos, Politis, Tsantilis, Sotiriou
1985–86	4th place	Winners	Cup Winners' Cup; Last 16	Michalis Kyritsis	David Stergakos, Liveris Andritsos, Memos Ioannou, Kyriakos Vidas, Argiris Papapetrou, Giorgos Skropolithas, Petroudakis
1986–87	5th place	Last 16	Cup Winners' Cup; Last 32	Kostas Mourouzis	David Stergakos, Liveris Andritsos, Memos Ioannou, Argyris Papapetrou, Giorgos Skropolithas, Kostas Missas, Dimitris Dimakopoulos, Dionysis Fragiskatos
1987–88	5th place	Last 16	Korać Cup; Last 32	Richard Dukeshire	David Stergakos, Liveris Andritsos, Memos Ioannou, Argyris Papapetrou, Giorgos Skropolithas, Kostas Missas, Dimitris Dimakopoulos, Dionysis Fragiskatos
1988–89	3rd place	Last 4	Korać Cup; Last 16	Michalis Kyritsis	Edgar Jones, David Stergakos, Liveris Andritsos, Memos Ioannou, Argyris Papapetrou, Giorgos Skropolithas, Argyris Pedoulakis, Dimitris Dimakopoulos, Dionysis Fragiskatos
1989–90	5th place	Last 8	Korać Cup; Last 64	Christos Iordanidis	Edgar Jones, David Stergakos, Liveris Andritsos, Memos Ioannou, Takis Koroneos, Argyris Papapetrou, Giorgos Skropolithas, Argyris Pedulakis, Dimitris Dimakopoulos, Dionysis Fragiskatos
1990–91	7th place	Last 4	Korać Cup; Last 16	Christos Iordanidis	Antonio Davis, David Stergakos, Liveris Andritsos, Giorgos Skropolithas, Argyris Pedulakis, Argyris Papapetrou, Dimitris Dimakopoulos, Wayne Yearwood, Dinos Kalambakos
1991–92	8th place	Last 4	Korać Cup; Last 16	Željko Pavličević	Fragiskos Alvertis, Antonio Davis, Nikos Ekonomou, Christos Myriounis, Minas Gekos, David Stergakos, Liveris Andritsos, Argyris Papapetrou, Giorgos Skropolithas, Argyris Pedulakis, Dinos Kalambakos Yannis Georgikopoulos, Greg Ikonomu, Sotiris Manolopoulos, Scott Roth
1992–93	2nd place	Winners	Not participated	Željko Pavličević	Fragiskos Alvertis, Nikos Galis, Arijan Komazec, Stojko Vranković, Tiit Sokk, Nikos Ekonomou, Christos Myriounis, Argiris Papapetrou, Giannis Georgikopoulos
1993–94	3rd place	Last 16	EuroLeague; 3rd place	Kostas Politis	Fragiskos Alvertis, Nikos Galis, Sasha Volkov, Stojko Vranković, Tiit Sokk, Nikos Ekonomou, Christos Myriounis, Costas Patavoukas, Yannis Papayannis, Giannis Georgikopoulos, Minas Gekos, Aivar Kuusmaa, Giorgos Chrysanthopoulos, Dionysis Kourlis
1994–95	2nd place	Last 16	EuroLeague; 3rd place	Efthimis Kiumurtzoglou	Fragiskos Alvertis, Nikos Galis, Panagiotis Giannakis, Žarko Paspalj, Stojko Vranković, Miroslav Pecarski, Tiit Sokk, Nikos Ekonomou, Christos Myriounis, Costas Patavoukas, Yannis Papayannis, Giannis Georgikopoulos, Aivar Kuusmaa, Giorgos Chrysanthopoulos, Dionysis Kourlis
1995–96	2nd place	Winners	EuroLeague; Champion	Božidar Maljković	Fragiskos Alvertis, Dominique Wilkins, Stojko Vranković, Panagiotis Giannakis, Nikos Ekonomou, Kostas Patavoukas, Jon Korfas, Tzanis Stavrakopoulos, Miroslav Pecarski, Vagelis Vourtzoumis, Christos Myriounis
1996–97	5th place	Last 4	EuroLeague Last 8	Božidar Maljković Michalis Kyritsis	Fragiskos Alvertis, Nikos Ekonomou, Byron Dinkins, Michael Koch, Jon Korfas, Marcelo Nicola, Hugo Sconochini, Ferran Martínez, Julius Nwosu, John Amaechi, Vagelis Vourtzoumis, Giannis Georgikopoulos, John Salley, Sasa Markovic, Leonidas Skoutaris
1996–97			Intercontinental Cup Winner	Božidar Maljković Michalis Kyritsis	Fragiskos Alvertis, Nikos Ekonomou, Byron Dinkins, Michael Koch, Jon Korfas, Marcelo Nicola, Hugo Sconochini, Ferran Martínez, Julius Nwosu, John Amaechi, Vagelis Vourtzoumis, Giannis Georgikopoulos, John Salley, Sasa Markovic, Leonidas Skoutaris
1997–98	Champion	Last 4	EuroCup; Last 4	Slobodan Subotić	Fragiskos Alvertis, Dino Rađa, Byron Scott, Fannis Christodoulou, Nikos Ekonomou, Antonis Fotsis, Michael Koch, Ferran Martínez, Costas Patavoukas, Sascha Hupmann, Giorgos Kalaitzis, Johnny Branch, Andreas Glyniadakis, Vagelis Vourtzoumis
1998–99	Champion	Last 8	EuroLeague; Last 16	Slobodan Subotić	Fragiskos Alvertis, Dejan Bodiroga, Dino Rađa, Nikos Ekonomou, Ferdinando Gentile, Michael Koch, Costas Patavoukas, Nikos Boudouris, Pat Burke, Sascha Hupmann, Giorgos Kalaitzis, Kostas Maglos, Alexandros Anthis
1999–00	Champion	Finalist	EuroLeague; Champion	Željko Obradović	Fragiskos Alvertis, Dejan Bodiroga, Željko Rebrača, Johnny Rogers, Oded Kattash, Giorgos Kalaitzis, Antonis Fotsis, Ferdinando Gentile, Michael Koch, Nikos Boudouris, Pat Burke
2000–01	Champion	Finalist	SuproLeague; Finalist	Željko Obradović	Fragiskos Alvertis, Dejan Bodiroga, Željko Rebrača, Johnny Rogers, Pat Burke, Antonis Fotsis, Ferdinando Gentile, Giorgos Kalaitzis, Oded Kattash, Michael Koch, Darryl Middleton, Giorgos Baloyannis, Andreas Glyniadakis, Yannis Rodostoglou, Marios Voulgaridis
2001–02	3rd place	Last 4	Euroleague; Champion	Željko Obradović	Fragiskos Alvertis, Dejan Bodiroga, İbrahim Kutluay, Johnny Rogers, Darryl Middleton, Giorgos Kalaitzis, Damir Mulaomerović, Pepe Sánchez, Giannis Sioutis, Giorgos Balogiannis, Lazaros Papadopoulos, Giannis Giannoulis, Christos Vidalis, Michalis Svoronos, Serafim Theos, Corey Albano
2002–03	Champion	Winner	Euroleague; Last 8	Željko Obradović	Fragiskos Alvertis, Jaka Lakovič, Ariel McDonald, Darryl Middleton, Kostas Tsartsaris, Giorgos Balogiannis, Giorgos Kalaitzis, Antonis Fotsis, Lazaros Papadopoulos, Rodney Buford, Jurica Žuža, Christos Vidalis
2003–04	Champion	Last 32	Euroleague; Last 16	Željko Obradović	Fragiskos Alvertis, Darryl Middleton, Mike Batiste, Ariel McDonald, Jaka Lakovič, Nikos Hatzivrettas, Kostas Tsartsaris, Dimitris Papanikolaou, Giannis Gagaloudis, Giorgos Kalaitzis, Dušan Šakota, Giorgos Maslarinos, Artemis Kouvaris, Haris Mujezinović
2004–05	Champion	Winner	Euroleague; 3rd place	Željko Obradović	Fragiskos Alvertis, Dimitris Diamantidis, Giorgos Kalaitzis, Jaka Lakovič, İbrahim Kutluay, Vlado Šćepanović, Nikos Hatzivrettas, Dimitris Papanikolaou, Mike Batiste, Kostas Tsartsaris, Lonny Baxter, Darryl Middleton, Patrick Femerling, Dušan Šakota, Vasilis Xanthopoulos
2005–06	Champion	Winner	Euroleague; Last 8	Željko Obradović	Fragiskos Alvertis, Dimitris Diamantidis, Giorgos Kalaitzis, Jaka Lakovič, Vassilis Spanoulis, Vlado Šćepanović, Nikos Hatzivrettas, Dimitris Papanikolaou, Dušan Šakota, Mike Batiste, Kostas Tsartsaris, Dejan Tomašević, Patrick Femerling, Brandon Hunter
2006–07	Champion	Winner	Euroleague; Champion	Željko Obradović	Fragiskos Alvertis, Dimitris Diamantidis, Ramūnas Šiškauskas, Sani Bečirovič, Mike Batiste, Nikos Hatzivrettas, Dimos Dikoudis, Kostas Tsartsaris, Tony Delk, Dimitris Papanikolaou, Vasilis Xanthopoulos, Dejan Tomašević, Dušan Šakota, Miloš Vujanić, Robertas Javtokas
2007–08	Champion	Winner	Euroleague; Last 16	Željko Obradović	Fragiskos Alvertis, Kostas Tsartsaris, Mike Batiste, Nikos Hatzivrettas, Dimitris Diamantidis, Vassilis Spanoulis, Dejan Tomašević, Dimos Dikoudis, Sani Bečirovič, Stratos Perperoglou, Šarūnas Jasikevičius, Kennedy Winston, Andrija Žižić, Nikola Prkačin, Aris Tatarounis
2008–09	Champion	Winner	Euroleague; Champion	Željko Obradović	Fragiskos Alvertis, Antonis Fotsis, Kostas Tsartsaris, Mike Batiste, Nikos Hatzivrettas, Dimitris Diamantidis, Vassilis Spanoulis, Stratos Perperoglou, Šarūnas Jasikevičius, Drew Nicholas, Nikola Peković, Giorgi Shermadini, Dimitris Verginis, Dušan Kecman
2009–10	Champion	Finalist	Euroleague; Last 16	Željko Obradović	Dimitris Diamantidis, Antonis Fotsis, Kostas Tsartsaris, Mike Batiste, Vassilis Spanoulis, Stratos Perperoglou, Šarūnas Jasikevičius, Drew Nicholas, Nikola Peković, Giorgi Shermadini, Dimitris Verginis, Nick Calathes, Milenko Tepić, Georgios Bogris, Jurica Golemac, Marcus Haislip, Ioannis Karamalegkos
2010–11	Champion	Finalist	Euroleague; Champion	Željko Obradović	Dimitris Diamantidis, Antonis Fotsis, Kostas Tsartsaris, Mike Batiste, Stratos Perperoglou, Drew Nicholas, Nick Calathes, Milenko Tepić, Georgios Bogris, Romain Sato, Aleks Marić, Kostas Kaimakoglou, Ian Vougioukas, Fotios Zoumpos, Ioannis Karamalegkos, Paris Maragkos
2011–12	2nd place	Winner	Euroleague; 4th place	Željko Obradović	Dimitris Diamantidis, Kostas Tsartsaris, Mike Batiste, Stratos Perperoglou, Šarūnas Jasikevičius, Nick Calathes, Romain Sato, Aleks Marić, Kostas Kaimakoglou, Ian Vougioukas, David Logan, Steven Smith, Alexis Kyritsis, Pat Calathes, Fotios Zoumpos
2012–13	Champion	Winner	Euroleague; Last 8	Argyris Pedoulakis	Dimitris Diamantidis, Kostas Tsartsaris, Sofoklis Schortsianitis, Stéphane Lasme, Jonas Mačiulis, Mike Bramos, Roko Ukić, James Gist, Marcus Banks, Vassilis Xanthopoulos, Charis Giannopoulos, Gaios Skordilis, Vassilis Charalampopoulos, Giorgos Diamantakos, Ramel Curry, R. T. Guinn, Jason Kapono
2013–14	Champion	Winner	Euroleague; Last 8	Argyris Pedoulakis, Fragiskos Alvertis	Dimitris Diamantidis, Antonis Fotsis, Mike Batiste, Jonas Mačiulis, Mike Bramos, Ramel Curry, Roko Ukić, Stéphane Lasme, James Gist, Loukas Mavrokefalidis, Nikos Pappas, Vlado Janković, Shang Ping, Gaios Skordilis, Vassilis Charalampopoulos, Giorgos Diamantakos, Georgios Apostolidis, Zack Wright
2014–15	2nd place	Winner	Euroleague; Last 8	Duško Ivanović, Sotiris Manolopoulos	Dimitris Diamantidis, Esteban Batista, Jānis Blūms, Lefteris Bochoridis, Antonis Fotsis, Vlado Janković, James Gist, Loukas Mavrokefalidis, DeMarcus Nelson, Nikos Pappas, A.J. Slaughter, Vasileios Charalampopoulos, Giorgos Diamantakos, Antonis Koniaris, Michalis Lountzis, Georgios Papagiannis, D.J. Cooper, Raymar Morgan, Gani Lawal, Julian Wright
2015–16	2nd place	Winner	Euroleague; Last 8	Aleksandar Đorđević; Argyris Pedoulakis	Dimitris Diamantidis, Aleksandar Pavlović, Vassilis Charalampopoulos, Antonis Koniaris, Lefteris Bochoridis, Vlado Janković, Antonis Fotsis, Miroslav Raduljica, Nikos Pappas, James Feldeine, James Gist, Nick Calathes, Georgios Kalaitzakis, Konstantinos Papadakis, Georgios Papagiannis, Michalis Lountzis, Ognjen Kuzmić, MarQuez Haynes, Elliot Williams, Vince Hunter
2016–17	Champion	Winner	EuroLeague; Last 8	Argyris Pedoulakis; Georgios Vovoras; Xavi Pascual	Antonis Fotsis, Vassilis Charalampopoulos, Nikos Pappas, James Feldeine, James Gist, Nick Calathes, Chris Singleton, K. C. Rivers, Mike James, Demetris Nichols, Lefteris Bochoridis, Kenny Gabriel, Alessandro Gentile, Ioannis Bourousis, Georgios Kalaitzakis, Michalis Lountzis, Kostas Gontikas, Pat Calathes
2017–18	Champion	Last 4	EuroLeague; Last 8	Xavi Pascual	Nikos Pappas, James Gist, Nick Calathes, Chris Singleton, K. C. Rivers, Marcus Denmon, Thanasis Antetokounmpo, Matt Lojeski, Lukas Lekavičius, Ian Vougioukas, Zach Auguste, Kenny Gabriel, Dinos Mitoglou, Georgios Kalaitzakis, Mike James, Adreian Payne, Lefteris Bochoridis
2018–19	Champion	Winner	EuroLeague; Last 8	Xavi Pascual, Rick Pitino	Nick Calathes, Keith Langford, Ioannis Papapetrou, Deshaun Thomas, James Gist, Lukas Lekavičius, Sean Kilpatrick, Matt Lojeski, Thanasis Antetokounmpo, Ian Vougioukas, Georgios Kalaitzakis, Nikos Pappas, Dinos Mitoglou, Georgios Papagiannis, Evangelos Sakellariou, Stéphane Lasme, Adreian Payne
2019–20	Champion	Last 8	EuroLeague suspended due to COVID-19	Argyris Pedoulakis, Rick Pitino	Nick Calathes, Jimmer Fredette, Ioannis Papapetrou, Deshaun Thomas, Georgios Papagiannis, Tyrese Rice, Rion Brown, Wesley Johnson, Ian Vougioukas, Ioannis Athinaiou, Nikos Pappas, Nikos Persidis, Dinos Mitoglou, Ben Bentil, Konstantinos Papadakis, Andy Rautins, Jacob Wiley
2020–21	Champion	Winner	EuroLeague	Georgios Vovoras, Kostas Charalampidis, Oded Kattash	Pierre Jackson, Keifer Sykes, Shelvin Mack, Nemanja Nedović, Ioannis Papapetrou, Aaron White, Georgios Papagiannis, Howard Sant-Roos, Marcus Foster, T.J. Bray, Leonidas Kaselakis, Dinos Mitoglou, Zach Auguste, Georgios Kalaitzakis, Eleftherios Bohoridis, Nikos Persidis, Mario Hezonja, Ben Bentil, Ian Vougioukas, Nikos Diplaros, Lefteris Mantzoukas
2021–22	2nd place	Finalist	EuroLeague	Dimitris Priftis, Georgios Vovoras	Kendrick Perry, Stefan Jović, Nemanja Nedović, Ioannis Papapetrou, Okaro White, Georgios Papagiannis, Yogi Ferrell, Peyton Siva, Daryl Macon, Howard Sant-Roos, Jeremy Evans, Jehyve Floyd, Lefteris Bohoridis, Leonidas Kaselakis, Nikos Chougkaz, Vassilis Kavvadas, Neoklis Avdalas, Lefteris Mantzoukas
2022–23	2nd place	Last 4	EuroLeague	Dejan Radonjić, Christos Serelis	Andrew Andrews, Dwayne Bacon, Nikos Chougkaz, Paris Lee, Marius Grigonis, Mateusz Ponitka, Derrick Williams, Georgios Papagiannis, Lefteris Bochoridis, Panagiotis Kalaitzakis, Georgios Kalaitzakis, Lefteris Mantzoukas, Artūras Gudaitis, Alexandros Samodurov, Dimitrios Agravanis, Neoklis Avdalas, Matt Thomas, Nate Wolters, Nikos Pappas
2023–24	Champion	Finalist	Euroleague; Champion	Ergin Ataman	Jerian Grant, Kendrick Nunn, Marius Grigonis, Dinos Mitoglou, Mathias Lessort, Kostas Sloukas, Luca Vildoza, Ioannis Papapetrou, Juancho Hernangómez, Kostas Antetokounmpo, Panagiotis Kalaitzakis, Aleksander Balcerowski, Dimitrios Moraitis, Lefteris Mantzoukas, Alexandros Samodurov
2024–25	2nd place	Winner	Euroleague; Final 4	Ergin Ataman	Panagiotis Kalaitzakis, Lorenzo Brown, Dimitrios Moraitis, Kostas Sloukas, Cedi Osman, Alexandros Samodurov, Ioannis Papapetrou, Jerian Grant, Tibor Pleiß, Kendrick Nunn, Mathias Lessort, Wenyen Gabriel, Kostas Antetokounmpo, Marius Grigonis, Juancho Hernangómez, Dinos Mitoglou, Ömer Yurtseven
2025–26	2nd place	Winner	Euroleague; Last 8	Ergin Ataman	Panagiotis Kalaitzakis, T. J. Shorts, Kenneth Faried, Kostas Sloukas, Cedi Osman, Alexandros Samodurov, Ioannis Kouzeloglou, Jerian Grant, Nigel Hayes-Davis, Kendrick Nunn, Mathias Lessort, Nikos Rogkavopoulos, Marius Grigonis, Juancho Hernangómez, Dinos Mitoglou, Ömer Yurtseven, Vassilis Toliopoulos, Richaun Holmes

== Season by season ==
Season	Tier	League	Pos.	Greek Cup	European competitions		GBL Record	EuroLeague Record
1945–46	1	GBL	1st					
1946–47	1	GBL	1st					
1948–49	1	GBL	4th					
1950–51	1	GBL	1st					
1952–53	1	GBL	2nd					
1953–54	1	GBL	1st					
1960–61	1	GBL	1st					
1961–62	1	GBL	1st		1 Euroleague	R32		
1962–63	1	GBL	4th		1 Euroleague	R16		
1963–64	1	GBL	3rd					
1964–65	1	GBL	6th					
1965–66	1	GBL	3rd					
1966–67	1	GBL	1st					
1967–68	1	GBL	2nd		1 Euroleague	R16		
1968–69	1	GBL	1st		2 Winners' Cup	SF		
1969–70	1	GBL	2nd		1 Euroleague	L16		
1970–71	1	GBL	1st		2 Winners' Cup	L16		
1971–72	1	GBL	1st		1 Euroleague	SF		
1972–73	1	GBL	1st		1 Euroleague	L32		
1973–74	1	GBL	1st		1 Euroleague	L16		
1974–75	1	GBL	1st		1 Euroleague	L16		
1975–76	1	GBL	3rd	Semifinalist	1 Euroleague	L16		
1976–77	1	GBL	1st	Semifinalist	3 Korać Cup	L27		
1977–78	1	GBL	2nd	Semifinalist	1 Euroleague	L18		
1978–79	1	GBL	3rd	Semifinalist	1 Korać Cup	L16		
1979–80	1	GBL	1st	Quarterfinalist	1 Euroleague	QF		
1980–81	1	GBL	1st	Quarterfinalist	1 Euroleague	QF		
1981–82	1	GBL	1st	Winners	1 Euroleague	SF		
1982–83	1	GBL	3rd	Winners	1 Euroleague	L24		
1983–84	1	GBL	1st	Semifinalist	2 Winners' Cup	QF		
1984–85	1	GBL	3rd	Runner-up	1 Euroleague	QF		
1985–86	1	GBL	4th	Winners	2 Winners' Cup	L16		
1986–87	1	GBL	5th	Last 16	2 Winners' Cup	L32		
1987–88	1	GBL	5th	Last 16	3 Korać Cup	L32		
1988–89	1	GBL	3rd	Semifinalist	3 Korać Cup	L16		
1989–90	1	GBL	5th	Quarterfinalist	3 Korać Cup	R64		
1990–91	1	GBL	7th	Semifinalist	3 Korać Cup	L16		
1991–92	1	GBL	8th	Semifinalist	3 Korać Cup	L16		
1992–93	1	GBL	2nd	Winners				
1993–94	1	GBL	3rd	Last 16	1 EuroLeague	3rd	27–10	14–7
1994–95	1	GBL	2nd	Winners	1 EuroLeague	3rd	30–5	14–7
1995–96	1	GBL	2nd	Winners	1 EuroLeague	C	27–10	15–6
1996–97	1	GBL	5th	Semifinalist	1 EuroLeague	QF	19–10	15–5
1997–98	1	GBL	1st	Semifinalist	2 Saporta Cup	SF	28–9	
1998–99	1	GBL	1st	Quarterfinalist	1 EuroLeague	L16	28–7	15–3
1999–00	1	GBL	1st	Runner-up	1 EuroLeague	C	28–6	19–4
2000–01	1	GBL	1st	Runner-up	1 SuproLeague	RU	27–6	18–6
2001–02	1	GBL	3rd	Semifinalist	1 Euroleague	C	21–7	19–3
2002–03	1	GBL	1st	Winners	1 Euroleague	QF	28–7	14–6
2003–04	1	GBL	1st	Last 32	1 Euroleague	L16	29–5	9–11
2004–05	1	GBL	1st	Winners	1 Euroleague	3rd	30–7	15–10
2005–06	1	GBL	1st	Winners	1 Euroleague	QF	32–2	16–7
2006–07	1	GBL	1st	Winners	1 Euroleague	C	32–4	20–4
2007–08	1	GBL	1st	Winners	1 Euroleague	L16	31–5	15–5
2008–09	1	GBL	1st	Winners	1 Euroleague	C	30–5	17–5
2009–10	1	GBL	1st	Runner-up	1 Euroleague	L16	33–2	10–6
2010–11	1	GBL	1st	Runner-up	1 Euroleague	C	32–3	16–6
2011–12	1	GBL	2nd	Winners	1 Euroleague	4th	29–6	14–9
2012–13	1	GBL	1st	Winners	1 Euroleague	QF	30–4	17–12
2013–14	1	GBL	1st	Winners	1 Euroleague	QF	33–3	14–15
2014–15	1	GBL	2nd	Winners	1 Euroleague	QF	28–7	13–15
2015–16	1	GBL	2nd	Winners	1 Euroleague	QF	31–6	15–12
2016–17	1	GBL	1st	Winners	1 EuroLeague	QF	31–4	19–14
2017–18	1	GBL	1st	Semifinalist	1 EuroLeague	QF	34–2	20–14
2018–19	1	GBL	1st	Winners	1 EuroLeague	QF	31–2	16–17
2019–20	1	GBL	1st	Winners	1 EuroLeague	QF	18–2	14–14
2020–21	1	GBL	1st	Winners	1 EuroLeague	L16	28–4	11–23
2021–22	1	GBL	2nd	Runner-up	1 EuroLeague	L16	27–7	9-19
2022–23	1	GBL	2nd	Semifinalist	1 EuroLeague	17th	22–11	9–23
2023–24	1	GBL	1st	Runner-up	1 EuroLeague	C	33–3	28–13
2024–25	1	GBL	2nd	Winners	1 EuroLeague	SF	27–3	25-16
2025–26	1	GBL	TBC	Winners	1 EuroLeague	QF	TBC	25-19

== International record ==
Season	Achievement	Notes
EuroLeague
1971–72	Semi-finals	eliminated by Ignis Varese, 78–70 (W) in Athens, 55–69 (L) in Varese
1981–82	Semi-final group stage	6th place in a group with Maccabi Tel Aviv, Squibb Cantù, Partizan, FC Barcelona and Nashua EBBC
1993–94	Final four	3rd place in Tel Aviv, lost to Olympiacos 72–77 (L) in the semi-final, defeated Banca Catalana FC Barcelona 100–83 (W) in the 3rd place game
1994–95	Final four	3rd place in Zaragoza, lost to Olympiacos 52–58 (L) in the semi-final, defeated Limoges CSP 91–77 (W) in the 3rd place game
1995–96	Champions	defeated CSKA Moscow 81–71 (W) in the semi-final, defeated Banca Catalana FC Barcelona 67–66 (W) in the final of the Final Four in Paris
1996–97	Quarter-finals	eliminated 2–0 by Olympiacos, 49–69 (L) in Athens, 57–65 (L) in Piraeus
1999–00	Champions	defeated Efes Pilsen 81–71 (W) in the semi-final, defeated Maccabi Tel Aviv 73–67 (W) in the final of the Final Four in Thessaloniki
2000–01	Final	defeated Efes Pilsen 74–66 (W) in the semi-final, lost to Maccabi Tel Aviv 67–81 (L) in the Final Paris
2001–02	Champions	defeated Maccabi Tel Aviv 83–75 (W) in the semi-final, defeated Kinder Bologna 89–83 (W) in the final of the Final Four in Bologna
2004–05	Final four	3rd place in Moscow, lost to Maccabi Tel Aviv 82–91 (L) in the semi-final, defeated CSKA Moscow 94–91 (W) in the 3rd place game
2005–06	Quarter-finals	eliminated 2–1 by Tau Cerámica, 84–72 (W) in Athens, 79–85 (L) in Vitoria-Gasteiz, 71–74 (L) in Athens
2006–07	Champions	defeated Tau Cerámica 67–53 (W) in the semi-final, defeated CSKA Moscow 93–91 (W) in the final of the Final Four in Athens
2008–09	Champions	defeated Olympiacos 84–82 (W) in the semi-final, defeated CSKA Moscow 73–71 (W) in the final of the Final Four in Berlin
2010–11	Champions	defeated Montepaschi Siena 77–69 (W) in the semi-final, defeated Maccabi Tel Aviv 70–78 (W) in the final of the Final Four in Barcelona
2011–12	Final four	4th place in Istanbul, lost to CSKA Moscow 64–66 (L) in the semi-final, lost to FC Barcelona Regal 69–74 (L) in the 3rd place game
2012–13	Quarter-finals	eliminated 3–2 by FC Barcelona Regal, 70–72 (L) & 66-65 (W) in Barcelona, 65–63 (W) & 60-70 (L) in Athens and 53–63 (L) in Barcelona
2013–14	Quarter-finals	eliminated 3–2 by CSKA Moscow, 74-77 (L) & 51-77 (L) in Moscow, 65-59 (W) & 73-72 (W) in Athens and 44-74 (L) in Moscow
2014–15	Quarter-finals	eliminated 3–1 by CSKA Moscow, 66-93 (L) & 80-100 (L) in Moscow, 86-85 (W) & 55-74 (L) in Athens
2015–16	Quarter-finals	eliminated 3–0 by Laboral Kutxa, 68-84 (L) & 78-82 (L) in Vitoria-Gasteiz, 75-84 (L) in Athens
2016–17	Quarter-finals	eliminated 3–0 by Fenerbahçe, 58-71 (L) & 75-80 (L) in Athens, 61-79 (L) in Istanbul
2017–18	Quarter-finals	eliminated 3–1 by Real Madrid, 95-67 (W) & 82-89 (L) in Athens, 74-81 (L) & 82-89 (L) in Madrid
2018–19	Quarter-finals	eliminated 3–0 by Real Madrid, 72-75 (L) & 63-78 (L) in Madrid, 82-89 (L) in Athens
2023–24	Champions	defeated Fenerbahçe 73–57 (W) in the semi-final, defeated Real Madrid 95–80 (W) in the final of the Final Four in Berlin
2024–25	`Final-Four	eliminated 82-76 (L) by Fenerbahçe in the semi-final, lost 97-93 (L) in 3rd place game against Olympiacos at the Final Four in Abu Dhabi
2025–26	Quarter-finals	eliminated 3–2 by Valencia Basket, 67-68 (W) 105-107 (OT) (W) & 81-64 (L) in Valencia, 91-87 (L) & 89-86 (L) in Athens
FIBA Saporta Cup
1968–69	Semi-finals	eliminated by Dinamo Tbilisi, 81–67 (W) in Athens, 71–103 (L) in Tbilisi
1979–80	Quarter-finals	3rd place in a group with Gabetti Cantù, Parker Leiden and Caen
1983–84	Quarter-finals	3rd place in a group with Real Madrid, Scavolini Pesaro and Rudá hvězda Pardubice
1997–98	Semi-finals	eliminated by Stefanel Milano, 77–58 (W) in Athens, 61–86 (L) in Milan
FIBA Intercontinental Cup
1996	Champions	defeated 2–1 Olimpia, 83-89 (L) in Venado Tuerto, 83-78 (W) and 101-76 (W) in Athens

== The road to the seven EuroLeague victories ==
=== EuroLeague 1996 ===
Round	Team	Home	Away
1st Round	Bye		
2nd Round	(Lithuania) Žalgiris	86–66	59–56
Group stage	(Spain) Real Madrid Teka	54–52	73–80
Group stage	(Spain) Banca Catalana FC Barcelona	74–95	57–63
Group stage	(Croatia) Cibona	79–61	93–82
Group stage	(France) Pau-Orthez	67–69	87–79
Group stage	(Portugal) Benfica	67–51	87–96
Group stage	(Italy) Buckler Beer Bologna	72–69	72–69
Group stage	(Israel) Maccabi Tel Aviv	67–62	86–79
Quarter finals	(Italy) Benetton Treviso	70–67	69–83
Quarter finals	(Italy) Benetton Treviso	70–67	65–64
Semifinal	(Russia) CSKA Moscow	81–71	
Final	(Spain) Banca Catalana FC Barcelona	67–66	

=== EuroLeague 2000 ===
Round	Team	Home	Away
Group stage 1	(Lithuania) Žalgiris	86–82	82–66
Group stage 1	(Turkey) Tofaş	79–74	64–59
Group stage 1	(Slovenia) Union Olimpija	100–80	86–71
Group stage 1	(Spain) Real Madrid Teka	96–69	66–63
Group stage 1	(Germany) Alba Berlin	70–72	73–54
Group stage 2	(Federal Republic of Yugoslavia) Crvena zvezda	67–58	76–61
Group stage 2	(France) Cholet	85–50	68–81
Group stage 2	(Greece) PAOK	71–75	77–69
Round of 16	(Federal Republic of Yugoslavia) Budućnost	65–59	64–77
Round of 16	(Federal Republic of Yugoslavia) Budućnost	78–61	64–77
Quarter finals	(Croatia) Cibona	73–62	69–63
Semifinal	(Turkey) Efes Pilsen	81–71	
Final	(Israel) Maccabi Tel Aviv	73–67	

=== EuroLeague 2002 ===
Round	Team	Home	Away
Group stage	(Italy) Skipper Bologna	81–70	79–77
Group stage	(Russia) CSKA Moscow	83–80	91–85
Group stage	(France) Pau-Orthez	67–63	79–67
Group stage	(Federal Republic of Yugoslavia) Budućnost	91–82	84–72
Group stage	(Slovenia) Krka	98–92	81–82
Group stage	(Croatia) Zadar	102–64	85–81
Group stage	(Spain) Real Madrid	77–88	78–70
Top 16	(Greece) Olympiacos	88–78	75–92
Top 16	(Slovenia) Union Olimpija	85–67	79–72
Top 16	(Greece) AEK	96–92	73–66
Semifinal	(Israel) Maccabi Tel Aviv	83–75	
Final	(Italy) Kinder Bologna	89–83	

=== EuroLeague 2007 ===
Round	Team	Home	Away
Regular Season	(Spain) DKV Joventut	83–73	82–79
Regular Season	(Croatia) Cibona VIP	86–69	78–75
Regular Season	(Slovenia) Union Olimpija	83–74	86–65
Regular Season	(Italy) Lottomatica Roma	87–71	79–69
Regular Season	(Spain) Unicaja	87–72	61–67
Regular Season	(Serbia) Partizan	80–93	73–65
Regular Season	(Israel) Maccabi Tel Aviv	90–88	73–76
Top 16	(Turkey) Efes Pilsen	84–57	79–65
Top 16	(Spain) Winterthur FC Barcelona	102–82	66–87
Top 16	(Poland) Prokom Trefl Sopot	95–68	75–69
Playoffs	(Russia) Dynamo Moscow	80–58	73–65
Semifinal	(Spain) Tau Cerámica	67–53	
Final	(Russia) CSKA Moscow	93–91	

=== EuroLeague 2009 ===
Round	Team	Home	Away
Regular Season	(Lithuania) Žalgiris	78–51	80–69
Regular Season	(Spain) Regal FC Barcelona	76–87	66–90
Regular Season	(France) SLUC Nancy	83–69	80–70
Regular Season	(Italy) Montepaschi Siena	81–76	77–82
Regular Season	(Poland) Prokom Trefl Sopot	75–53	67–60
Top 16	(Serbia) Partizan	81–63	56–63
Top 16	(Spain) Unicaja	103–95	81–69
Top 16	(Italy) Lottomatica Roma	92–67	90–71
Playoffs	(Italy) Montepaschi Siena	90–85	72–53
Playoffs	(Italy) Montepaschi Siena	79–84	91–84
Semifinal	(Greece) Olympiacos	84–82	
Final	(Russia) CSKA Moscow	73–71	

=== EuroLeague 2011 ===
Round	Team	Home	Away
Group stage 1	(Spain) Power Electronics Valencia	69–73	72–56
Group stage 1	(Russia) CSKA Moscow	74–60	72–68
Group stage 1	(Slovenia) Union Olimpija	95–88	84–85
Group stage 1	(Turkey) Efes Pilsen	84–61	78–79
Group stage 1	(Italy) Armani Jeans Milano	93–62	81–71
Group stage 2	(Lithuania) Lietuvos rytas	67–68	80–59
Group stage 2	(Spain) Unicaja	82–56	77–61
Group stage 2	(Spain) Caja Laboral	76–74	70–77
Quarter finals	(Spain) Regal FC Barcelona	76–74	82–83
Quarter finals	(Spain) Regal FC Barcelona	78–67	75–71
Semifinal	(Italy) Montepaschi Siena	77–69	
Final	(Israel) Maccabi Tel Aviv	78–70	

=== EuroLeague 2024 ===
Round	Team	Home	Away
Regular season	(Germany) Alba Berlin	84–75	99–85
Regular season	(Turkey) Anadolu Efes	83–76	68–71
Regular season	(Spain) FC Barcelona	89–81	72–80
Regular season	(Spain) Saski Baskonia	95–81	73–75
Regular season	(Germany) Bayern Munich	78–71	82–75
Regular season	(Serbia) Crvena zvezda Meridianbet	82–65	89–76
Regular season	(Italy) EA7 Emporio Armani Milan	79–62	76–68
Regular season	(Turkey) Fenerbahçe Beko	74–63	69–83
Regular season	(France) LDLC ASVEL	85–67	89–81
Regular season	(Israel) Maccabi Playtika Tel Aviv	81–86	75–90
Regular season	(France) AS Monaco	88–63	91–90
Regular season	(Greece) Olympiacos	78–88	65–71
Regular season	(Serbia) Partizan Mozzart Bet	84–71	87–92
Regular season	(Spain) Real Madrid	78–90	97–86
Regular season	(Spain) Valencia Basket	90–73	82–81
Regular season	(Italy) Virtus Segafredo Bologna	90–76	81–79
Regular season	(Lithuania) Žalgiris	73–71	68–80
Quarter finals	(Israel) Maccabi Playtika Tel Aviv	87–91	83–85
Quarter finals	(Israel) Maccabi Playtika Tel Aviv	95–79	95–88
Quarter finals	(Israel) Maccabi Playtika Tel Aviv	81–72	
Semifinal	(Turkey) Fenerbahçe Beko	73–57	
Final	(Spain) Real Madrid	95–80	

=== Other European achievements ===
Panathinaikos has advanced to the Final Four of the EuroLeague (and its predecessor) another five times: Tel Aviv in 1994 (3rd), Zaragoza in 1995 (3rd), Paris in 2001 (2nd), Moscow in 2005 (3rd), and Istanbul in 2012 (4th). Other significant successes are: the two appearances in the semifinals of the FIBA Cup Winners' Cup (1968–69, 1997–98), as well as the road to the semifinals of the FIBA European Champions' Cup in the 1971–72 season (eliminated by Ignis Varese (78–70, 55–69). In the 1981–82 season, Panathinaikos participated in the semifinals of the FIBA European Champions' Cup, after eliminating the teams of CSKA Moscow and Levski-Spartak, in that order.

Panathinaikos has reached the Final Four of the EuroLeague (and its equivalent predecessor competitions) on five additional occasions without winning the title: Tel Aviv in 1994 (3rd), Zaragoza in 1995 (3rd), Paris in 2001 (2nd), Moscow in 2005 (3rd), and Istanbul in 2012 (4th).

Other notable European achievements include two semifinals appearances in the FIBA Cup Winners' Cup (1968–69 and 1997–98). Panathinaikos also reached the semifinals of the FIBA European Champions' Cup in the 1971–72 season, where they were eliminated by Ignis Varese (78–70, 55–69). In the 1981–82 season, they again reached the semifinals after first eliminating CSKA Moscow and then Levski-Spartak.

=== EuroLeague Finals ===
On 26 May 2024, Panathinaikos wins the 7th title of EuroLeague.

11 April 1996
21:00 (CEST)

Report

Panathinaikos (Greece)	67–66	(Spain) Barcelona
Pts: Alvertis 17; Rebs: Wilkins 10; Asts: Oikonomou 5		Pts: Karnišovas 23; Rebs: Karnišovas 8 Asts: Godfread, 5

Palais Omnisports Paris
Attendance: 12,500
Referees: Reuven Virovnik (ISR), Pascal Dorizon (FRA)

20 April 2000
21:00 (CEST)

Report

Maccabi Tel Aviv (Israel)	67–73	(Greece) Panathinaikos
Pts: Brisker 13; Rebs: Huffman 10; Asts: Comegys 3		Pts: Rebrača 20; Rebs: Rebrača 8 Asts: Bodiroga, 2

P.A.O.K. Sports Arena
Attendance: 8,500
Referees: Romualdas Brazauskas (LIT), Iztok Rems (SLO)

5 May 2002
21:00 (CEST)

Report

Kinder Bologna (Italy)	83–89	(Greece) Panathinaikos
Scoring by quarter: 23-23, 25–17, 13–24, 22-25
Pts: Ginobili 27; Rebs: Jaric 7 Asts: Jaric 5		Pts: Kutluay 22; Rebs: Bodiroga 7 Asts: Bodiroga, 4

Palamalaguti
Attendance: 8,278
Referees: Miguelo Betancor (SPA), Juan Carlos Arteaga (SPA), Romualdas Brazauskas (LIT)

6 May 2007
21:00 (CEST)

Report

Panathinaikos (Greece)	93–91	(Russia) CSKA Moscow
Scoring by quarter: 18-17, 28–19, 19–21, 28-34
Pts: Siskauskas 20; Rebs: Batiste 5 Asts: Siskauskas 5		Pts: Papaloukas 23; Rebs: Andersen 6 Asts: Papaloukas, 8

OAKA Athens
Attendance: 18,363
Referees: Juan Carlos Mitjana (SPA), Luigi Lamonica (ITA), Ilija Belosevic (SER)

3 May 2009
21:00 (CEST)

Report

Panathinaikos (Greece)	73–71	(Russia) CSKA Moscow
Scoring by quarter: 21-16, 27–12, 8–18, 17-25
Pts: Fotsis 13; Rebs: Fotsis 8 Asts: Jasikevicius 4		Pts: Holden 14; Rebs: Smodis 9 Asts: Holden, 4

O2 World
Attendance: 13,238
Referees: Romualdas Brazauskas (LIT), Juan Carlos Arteaga (SPA), Shmuel Bachar (ISR), Fernando Rocha (POR)

8 May 2011
21:00 (CEST)

Report

Maccabi Tel Aviv (Israel)	70–78	(Greece) Panathinaikos
Scoring by quarter: 15-22, 15–11, 13–21, 27–24
Pts: Eidson 17; Rebs: Eidson 7 Asts: Pargo 4		Pts: Batiste 18; Rebs: Fotsis 7 Asts: Diamantidis, 9

Palau Sant Jordi
Attendance: 15,768
Referees: Juan Carlos Mitjana (SPA), Luigi Lamonica (ITA), Robert Lottermoser (GER)

26 May 2024
21:00 (CEST)

Report

Real Madrid (Spain)	80–95	(Greece) Panathinaikos
Scoring by quarter: 36–25, 18–24, 7–15, 19–31
Pts: Musa 15; Rebs: Hezonja 8 Asts: Campazzo 4		Pts: Sloukas 24; Rebs: Grant 6 Asts: Grant, 5

Uber Arena Berlin
Attendance: 13,578
Referees: Fernando Rocha (POR), Ilija Belosevic (SER), Mehdi Difallah (FRA)

== Friendly games against NBA and Chinese teams ==
Panathinaikos has twice made a tour of the United States, for friendly games. In 2003, when they played against the NBA team the Toronto Raptors, and in 2007. On 11 October 2007, Panathinaikos played against the NBA's Houston Rockets, and on 18 October 2007, they played against the defending NBA champions at the time, the San Antonio Spurs.

10 October 2003

Toronto Raptors (Canada)	100–76	(Greece) Panathinaikos

Air Canada Centre, Toronto, ON

11 October 2007

Boxscore

Houston Rockets (United States)	107–70	(Greece) Panathinaikos

(United States) Toyota Center, Houston, TX

13 October 2007

Boxscore

San Antonio Spurs (United States)	113–91	(Greece) Panathinaikos

(United States) AT&T Center, San Antonio, TX

Panathinaikos has also twice made a tour in China for friendly games. In 2013, when they played against Foshan Long Lions. On 28 September 2015, Panathinaikos played against Zhejiang Lions, and on 30 September 2015, they played against the Guangdong Tigers.

15 September 2013

Boxscore

Foshan Dralions (China)	66–67	(Greece) Panathinaikos

(China) Foshan Lingnan Mingzhu Gymnasium, Guangdong,

28 September 2015

Boxscore

Zhejiang Lions (China)	64–83	(Greece) Panathinaikos

(China) Hangzhou Gymnasium, Hangzhou, Zhejiang

30 September 2015

Boxscore

Guangdong Tigers (China)	63–85	(Greece) Panathinaikos

(China) Dongguan Arena, Dongguan, Guangdong

== Notable players ==
Listed as Green Legends in Panathinaikos B.C. site:

Note: Flags indicate national team eligibility at FIBA-sanctioned events. Players may hold other non-FIBA nationalities not displayed.

Criteria

To appear in this section a player must have either:

- Set a club record or won an individual award while at the club
- Played at least one official international match for their national team at any time
- Played at least one official NBA match at any time.

- (Greece) Faidon Matthaiou (1949–1955)
- (Greece) Giorgos Kolokithas (1966–1973)
- (Greece) Takis Koroneos (1968–1986, 1989–1990)
- (Greece) (United States) Chris Kefalos (1969–1978)
- (Greece) Dimitris Kokolakis (1969–1983)
- (Greece) Apostolos Kontos (1969–1983)
- (Greece) Memos Ioannou (1974–1990)
- (Greece) (United States) David Stergakos (1978–1991)
- (Greece) Nikos Galis (1992–1994)
- (United States) Dominique Wilkins (1995–1996)
- (Greece) Panagiotis Giannakis (1994–1996)
- (Croatia) Dino Rađja (1997–1999)
- (United States) Byron Scott (1997–1998)
- (Greece) Fanis Christodoulou (1997–1998)
- (Federal Republic of Yugoslavia) Željko Rebrača (1999–2001)
- (Federal Republic of Yugoslavia) Dejan Bodiroga (1998–2002)
- (United States) (Spain) Darryl Middleton (2000–2005)
- (Greece) Fragiskos Alvertis (1990–2009)
- (Lithuania) Sarunas Jasikevicius (2007–2010, 2011–2012)
- (United States) Mike Batiste (2003–2012, 2013–2014)
- (Greece) Dimitris Diamantidis (2004–2016)
- (Greece) Antonis Fotsis (1997–2001, 2002–2003, 2008–2011, 2013–2017)
- (United States) James Gist (2012–2019)
- (Greece) (United States) Nick Calathes (2009–2012, 2015–2020)

Mentioned by Panathinaikos B.C. as players who have left their mark in basketball history:

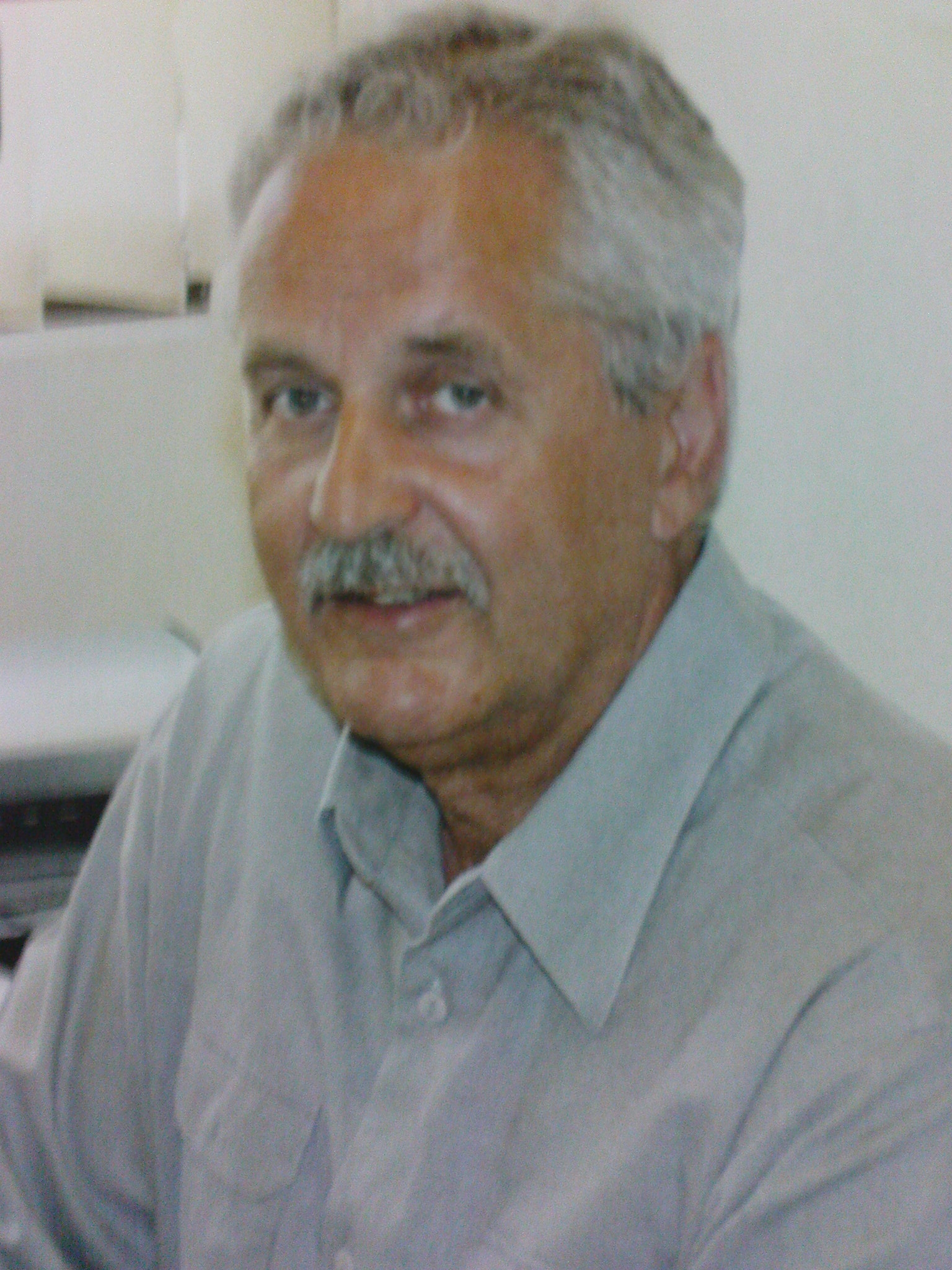
Apostolos Kontos

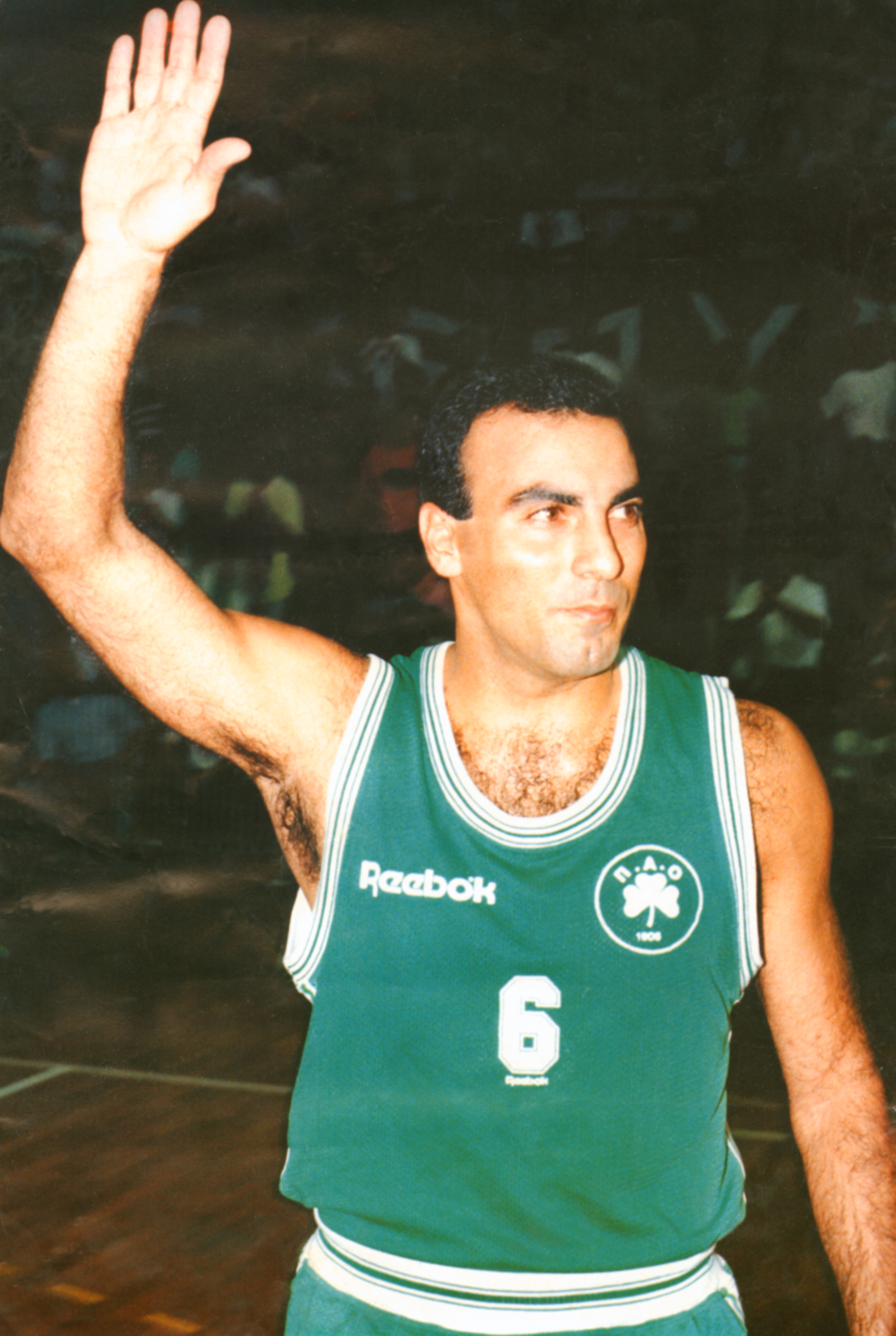
Nikos Galis

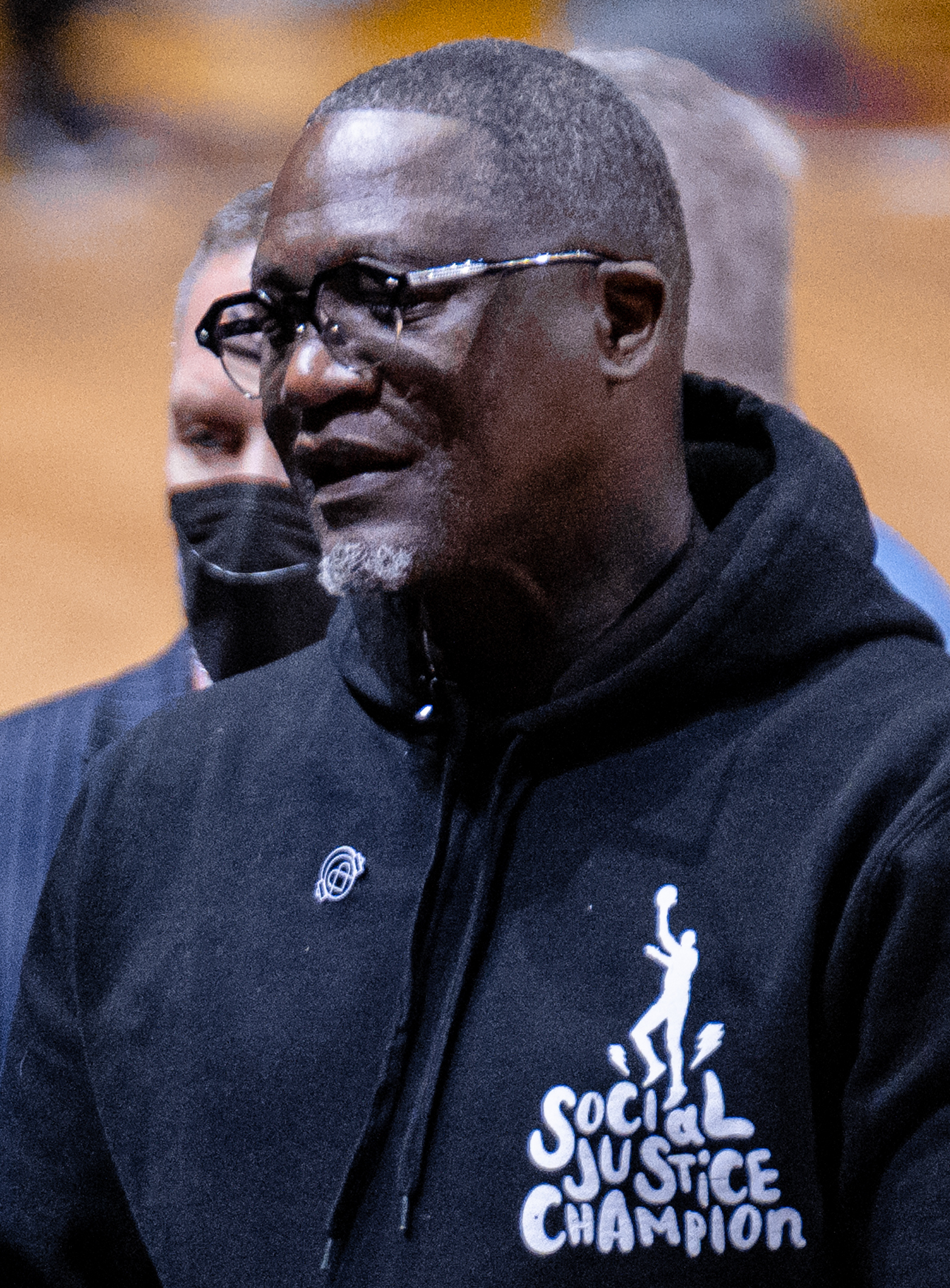
Dominique Wilkins

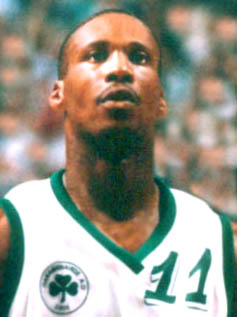
Byron Scott

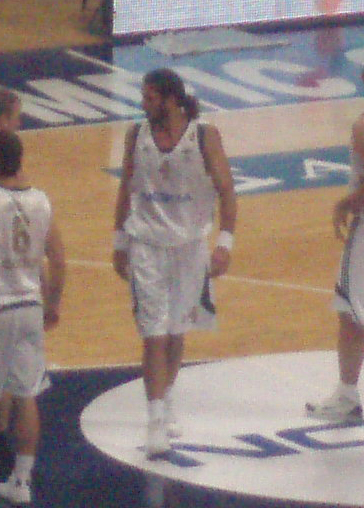
Fragiskos Alvertis

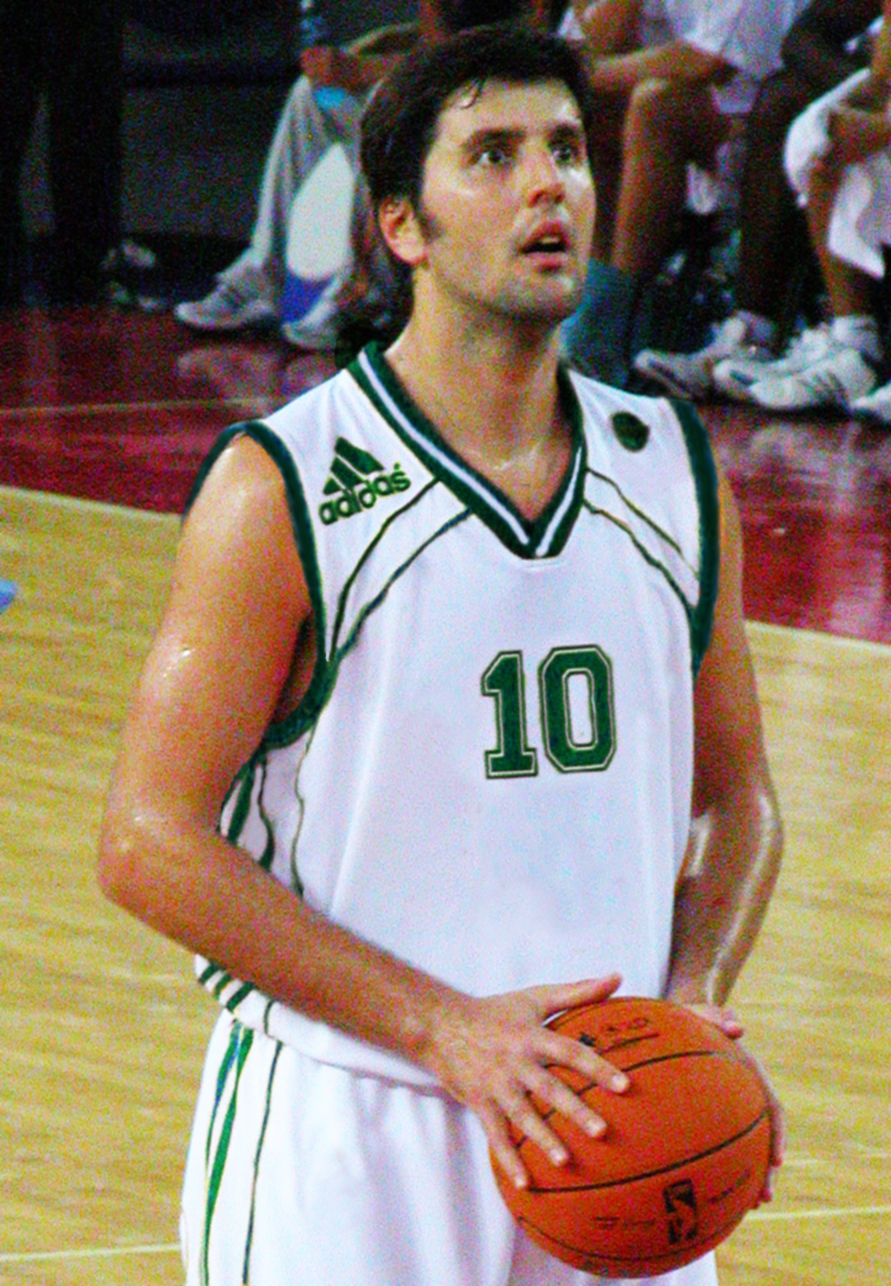
Dejan Bodiroga

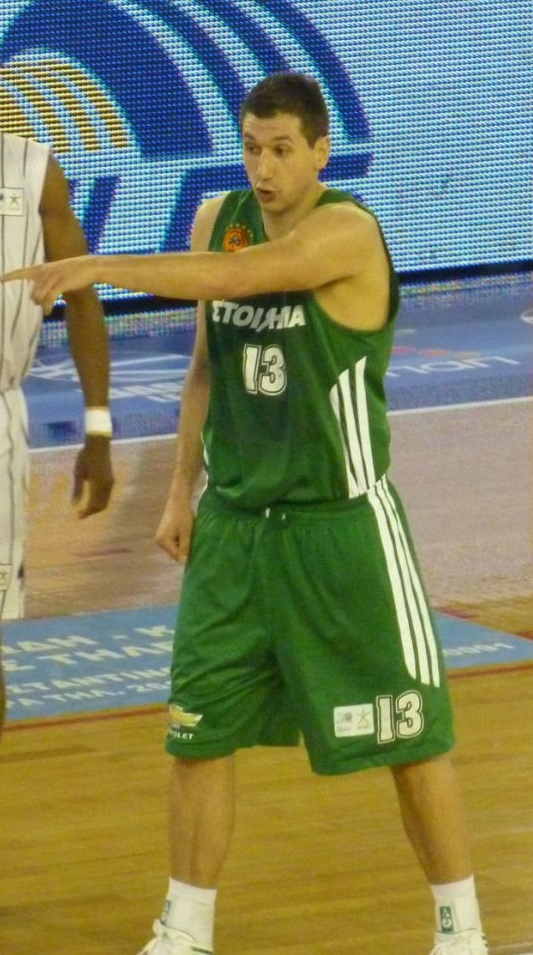
Dimitris Diamantidis

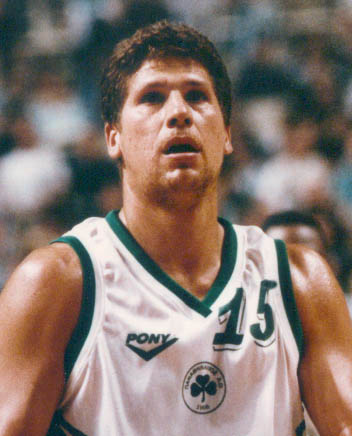
Fanis Christodoulou

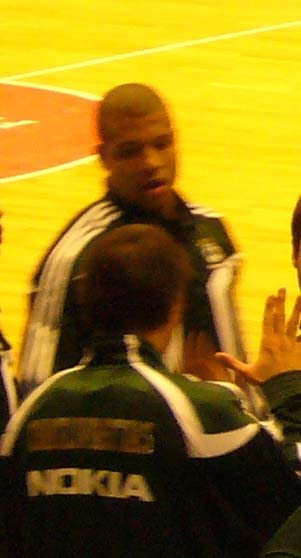
Mike Batiste

=== Club captains ===
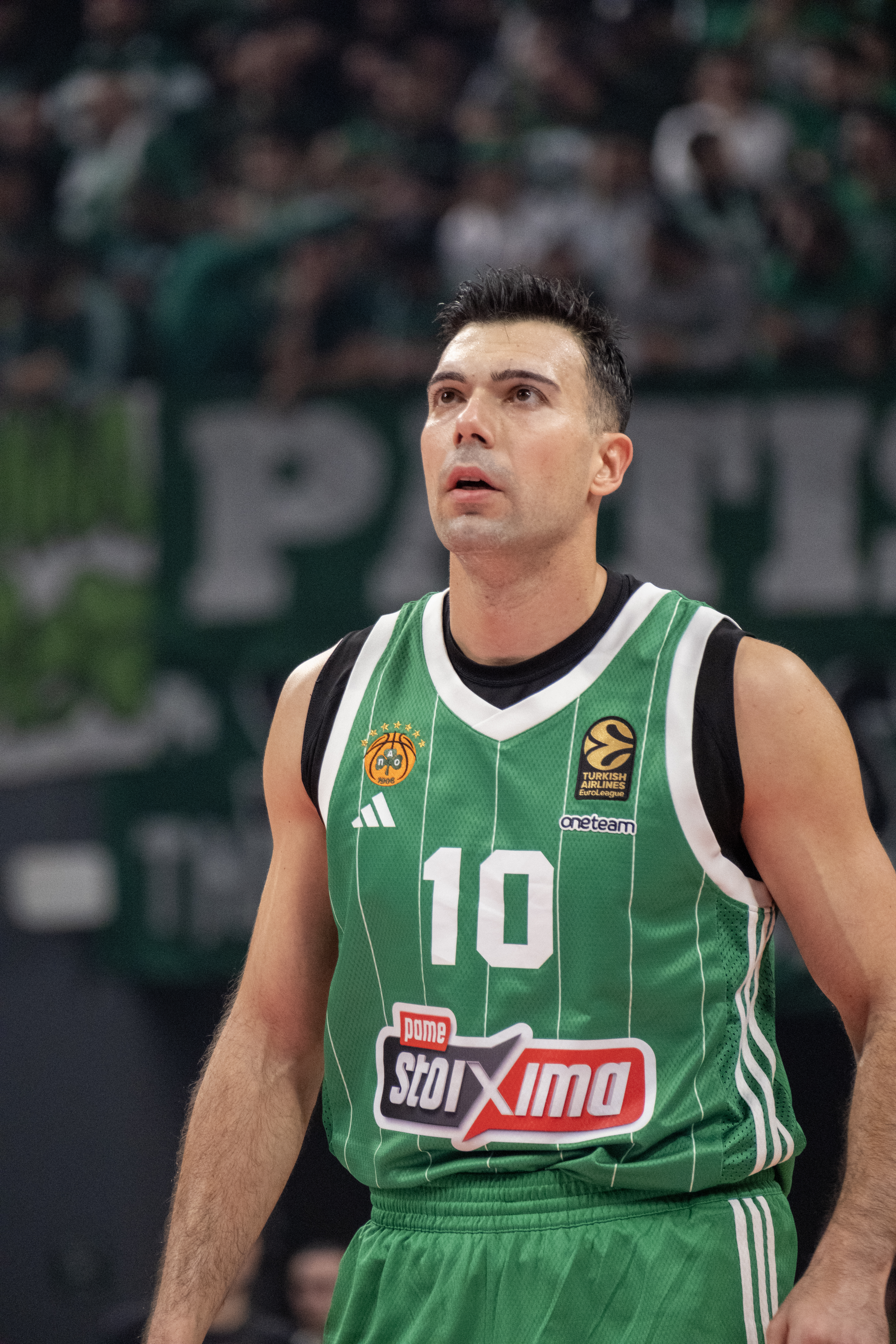
Kostas Sloukas

- (Greece) Apostolos Kontos (1972–1983)
- (Greece) Takis Koroneos (1983–1985)
- (Greece) Memos Ioannou (1985–1990)
- (Greece) Liveris Andritsos (1990–1992)
- (Greece) (United States) Nikos Galis (1992–1994)
- (Greece) Panagiotis Giannakis (1994–1996)
- (Greece) Nikos Oikonomou (1996–1997)
- (Greece) Kostas Patavoukas (1997–1999)
- (Greece) Fragiskos Alvertis (1999–2009)
- (Greece) Dimitris Diamantidis (2009–2016)
- (Greece) (United States) Nick Calathes (2016–2017)
- (Greece) Ian Vougioukas (2017–2018)
- (Greece) (United States) Nick Calathes (2018–2020)
- (Greece) Ioannis Papapetrou (2020–2022)
- (Greece) Georgios Papagiannis (2022–2023)
- (Greece) Kostas Sloukas (2023–present)

== Head coaches ==
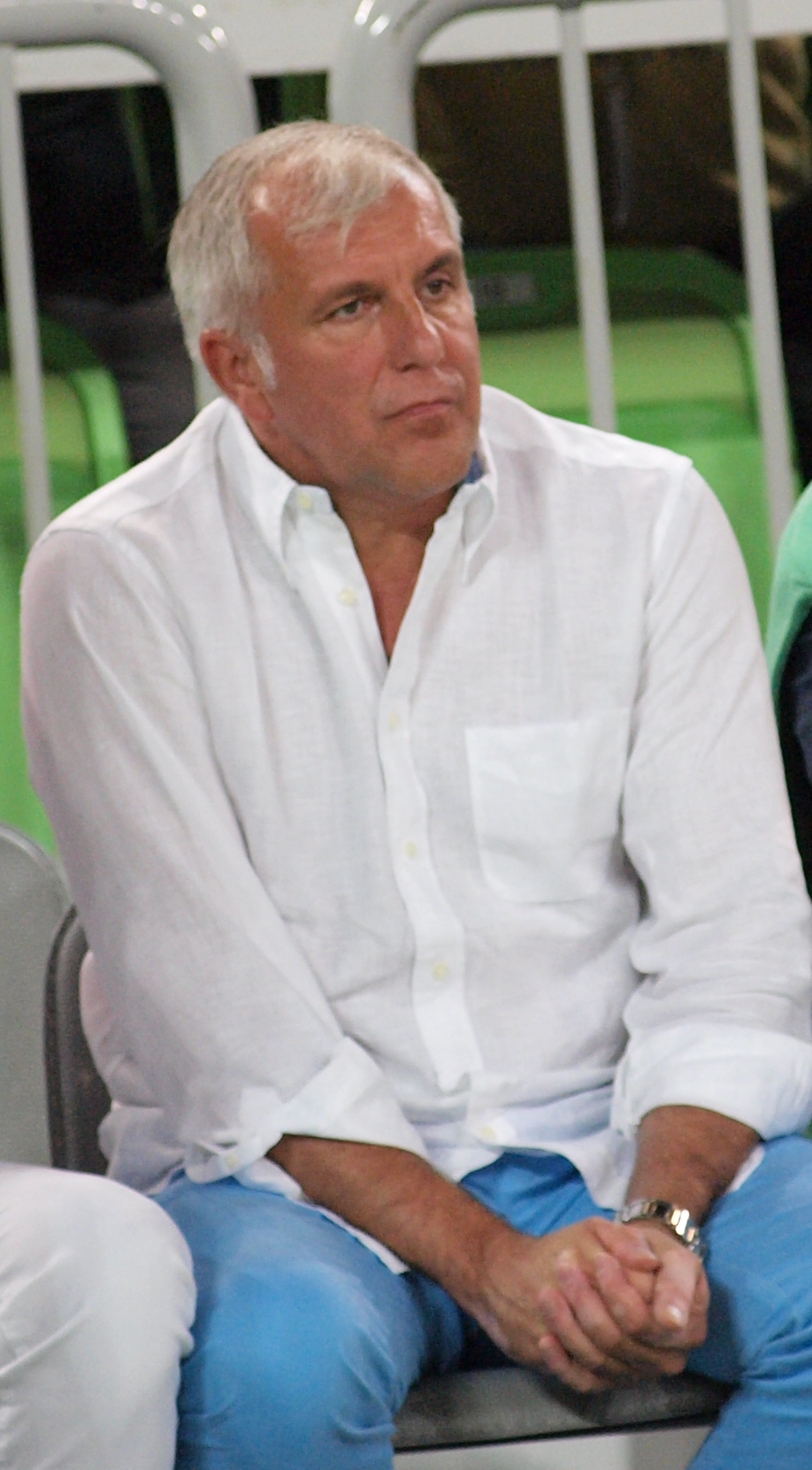
Željko Obradović

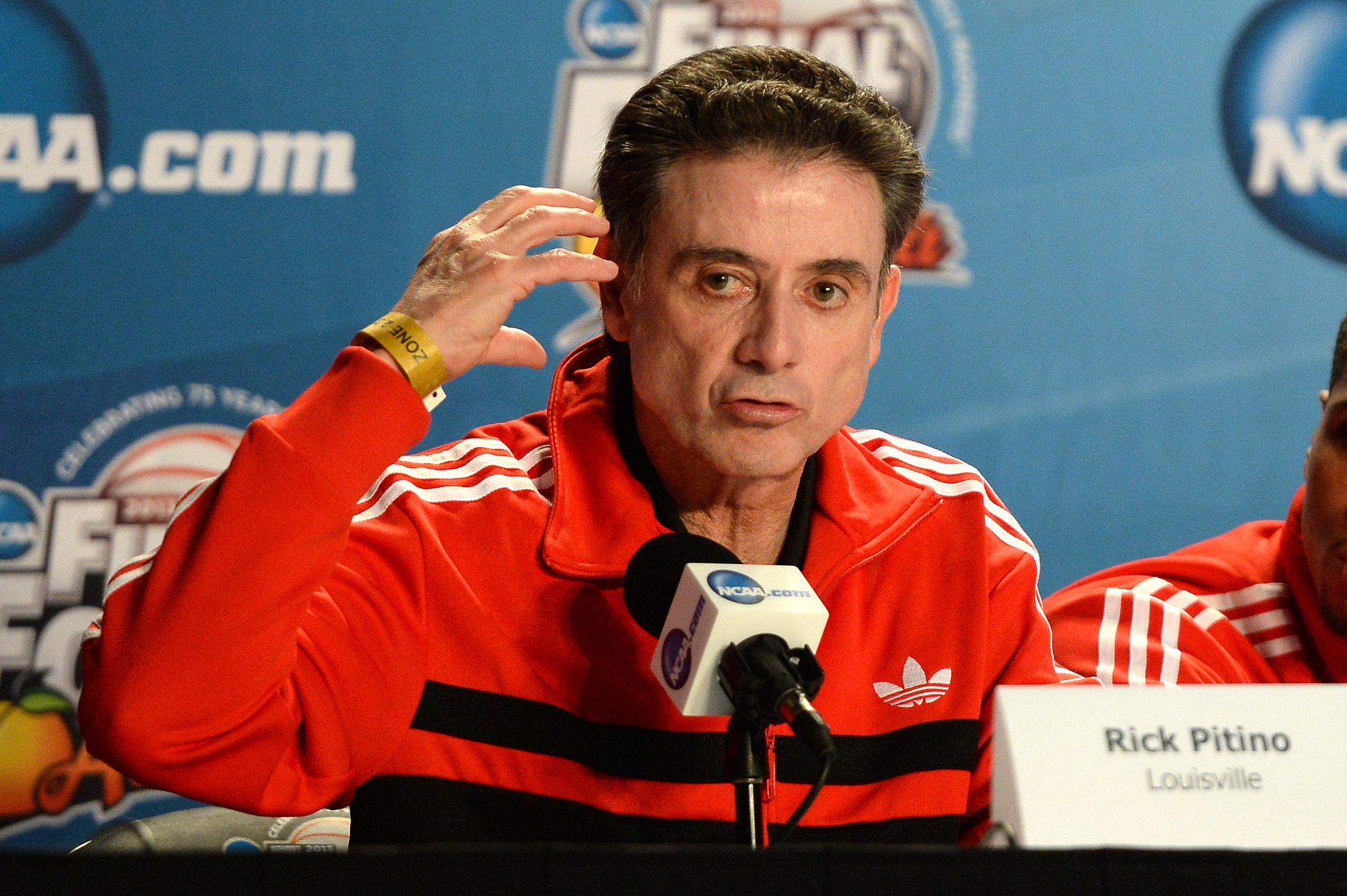
Rick Pitino

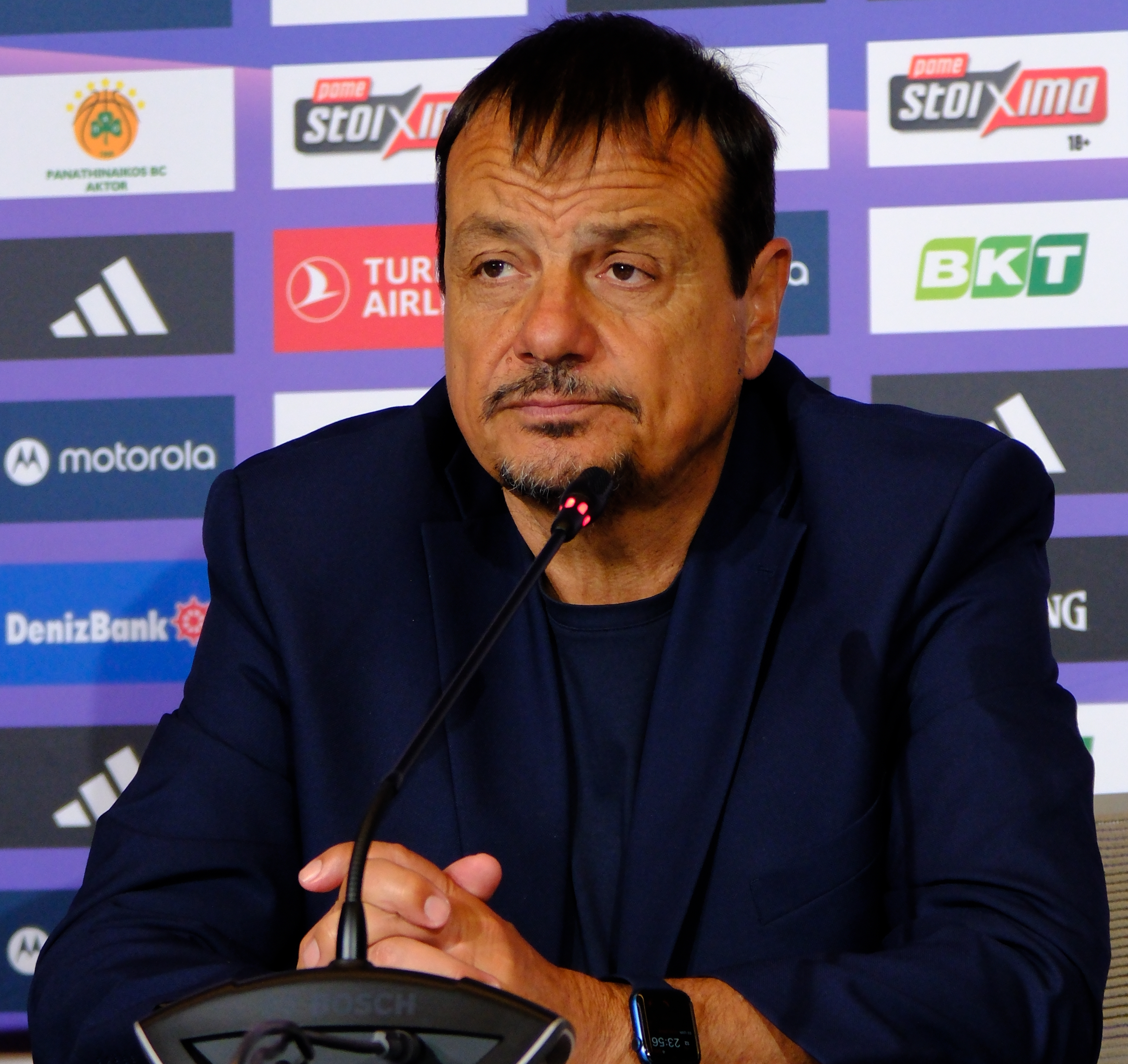
Ergin Ataman

- (Greece) Missas Pantazopoulos (1945–1951)
- (Greece) Nikos Milas (1960–1961, 1963–1965, 1975–1976)
- (Greece) Kostas Mourouzis (1966–1974, 1986–1987)
- (United States) Richard Dukeshire (1974–1975)
- (Greece) Michalis Kyritsis (1978, 1983–1986, 1988–1989, 1997)
- (Greece) Kostas Politis (1978–1982, 1993–1994)
- (Greece) Christos Kefalos (1982–1983)
- (Greece) Christos Iordanidis (1989–1991)
- (Croatia) Željko Pavličević (1991–1993)
- (Greece) Efthimis Kioumourtzoglou (1994–1995)
- (Federal Republic of Yugoslavia) Božidar Maljković (1995–1997)
- (Slovenia) (Greece) Slobodan Subotić (1997–1999)
- (Serbia and Montenegro) (Serbia) Željko Obradović (1999–2012, 2026–present)
- (Greece) Argyris Pedoulakis (2012–2014, 2016, 2019)
- (Montenegro) Duško Ivanović (2014–2015)
- (Serbia) Aleksandar Đorđević (2015–2016)
- (Spain) Xavi Pascual (2016–2018)
- (United States) Rick Pitino (2018–2019, 2019–2020)
- (Greece) Georgios Vovoras (2020–2021, 2022)
- (Greece) Kostas Charalampidis (2021)
- (Israel) Oded Kattash (2021)
- (Greece) Dimitris Priftis (2021–2022)
- (Montenegro) Dejan Radonjić (2022–2023)
- (Greece) Christos Serelis (2023)
- (Turkey) Ergin Ataman (2023–2026)

== Honours and statistics ==
=== GBL All-time regular season records ===
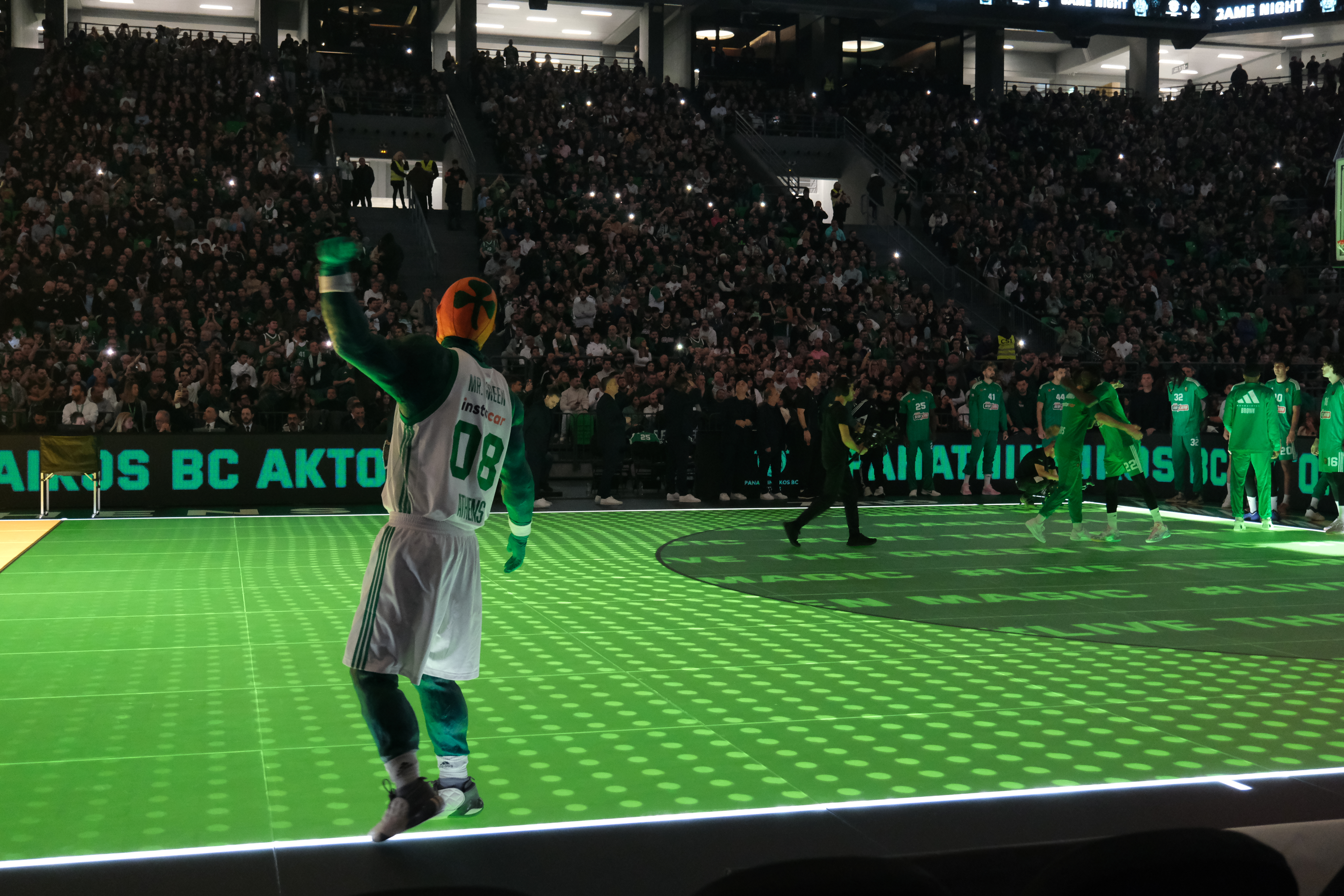
During a Panathinaikos game

Outline	Record
Champions without a loss	4 times (1945–46, 1950–51, 1951–52, 1953–54)
Champions in a row	9 seasons (2002–2003, 2003–2004, 2004–2005, 2005–2006, 2006–2007, 2007–2008, 2008–2009, 2009–2010, 2010–2011)
Best regular season record in A1 GBL	26-0 (2017–18)
Best playoffs record in A1 GBL	8-0 (2005–06, 2012–13)
Best regular season & playoffs record in A1 GBL	34-2 (2017–18)

=== Cup records ===
Outline	Record
Biggest win in a Greek Cup final	101-54 (vs Faros Keratsiniou, 2015–16)
Greek Cup Winners in a row	6 seasons (2011 to 2017)

=== European records ===
Outline	Record
Most points in a EuroLeague game	123 points (vs Chorale Roanne, 2007–08)

=== Top 10 players in games, points, rebounds and assists in the A1 Division (since the 1986–87 season) ===
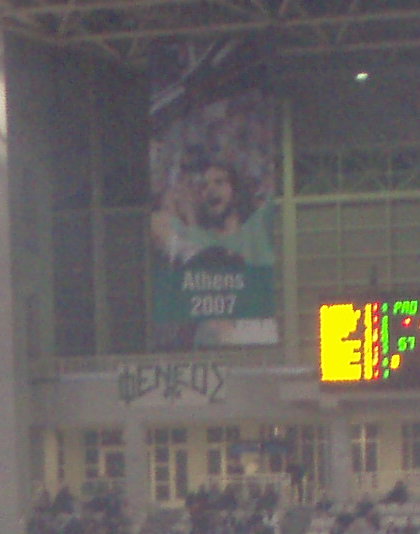
Giant portrait of Fragiskos Alvertis, OAKA Indoor Hall roof

Panathinaikos team leaders in games played, points scored, and rebounds, in games played in the Greek A1 Division, since it was first formed, starting with the 1986–87 season.

- * Still active player with the team.

As of 25 May 2022:

Most Games
Rank	Player	Games
1	(Greece) Fragiskos Alvertis	534
2	(Greece) Dimitris Diamantidis	397
3	(Greece) Antonis Fotsis	354
4	(Greece) Kostas Tsartsaris	345
5	(United States) Mike Batiste	303
6	(Greece) Nikos Oikonomou	268
7	(Greece) Nick Calathes	249
8	(Greece) Georgios Kalaitzis	221
9	(Greece) Nikos Chatzivrettas	204
10	(United States) James Gist	191

Most Points
Rank	Player	Points
1	(Greece) Fragiskos Alvertis	4,698
2	(Greece) Dimitris Diamantidis	3,928
3	(United States) Mike Batiste	2,950
4	(Greece) Kostas Tsartsaris	2,316
5	(Serbia) Dejan Bodiroga	2,285
6	(Greece) Nikos Oikonomou	2,207
7	(Greece) Antonis Fotsis	2,089
8	(Greece) Liveris Andritsos	2,088
9	(Greece) Nick Calathes	2,083
10	(Slovenia) Jaka Lakovič	1,596

Most Rebounds
Rank	Player	Rebounds
1	(Croatia) Stojan Vranković	1,851
2	(United States) Mike Batiste	1,501
3	(Greece) Kostas Tsartsaris	1,392
4	(Greece) Dimitris Diamantidis	1,356
5	(Greece) Antonis Fotsis	1,239
6	(Greece) Fragiskos Alvertis	1,214
7	(United States) James Gist	905
8	(Greece) Georgios Papagiannis *	800
9	(Serbia) Dejan Bodiroga	669
10	(Greece) Nick Calathes	590

Most Assists
Rank	Player	Assists
1	(Greece) Dimitris Diamantidis	1,728
2	(Greece) Nick Calathes	1,273
3	(Greece) Vassilis Spanoulis	469
4	(Serbia) Dejan Bodiroga	436
5	(Greece) Fragiskos Alvertis	408
6	(Greece) Nikos Galis	402
7	(Greece) Georgios Kalaitzis	385
8	(Lithuania) Šarūnas Jasikevičius	370
9	(Slovenia) Jaka Lakovič	359
10	(Greece) Antonis Fotsis	283

=== One-club men ===
Player	Nat.	Position	Debut	Last Game
Fragiskos Alvertis	(Greece)	SF	1990	2009

=== Individual honours ===
FIBA Hall of Fame

- Nikos Galis

Naismith Memorial Basketball Hall of Fame

- Dominique Wilkins
- Nikos Galis
- Rick Pitino
- Dino Rađja

FIBA's 50 Greatest Players

- Dino Rađja
- Alexander Volkov
- Giorgos Kolokithas
- Nikos Galis

50 Greatest EuroLeague Contributors

- Fragiskos Alvertis
- Dejan Bodiroga
- Nikos Galis
- Panagiotis Giannakis
- Šarūnas Jasikevičius
- Božidar Maljković
- Željko Obradović
- Dino Rađja

EuroLeague Basketball Legend Award

- Dimitris Diamantidis
- Šarūnas Jasikevičius
- Ramūnas Šiškauskas

EuroLeague Basketball 2001–10 All-Decade Team

- Dejan Bodiroga
- Dimitris Diamantidis
- Šarūnas Jasikevičius
- Ramūnas Šiškauskas

Mr. Europa

- Dimitris Diamantidis (2007)

All-Europe Player of the Year

- Dejan Bodiroga (2002)
- Dimitris Diamantidis (2007)

EuroLeague Executive of the Year

- Pavlos Giannakopoulos (2010–11)
- Thanasis Giannakopoulos (2010–11)

EuroLeague MVP

- Dimitris Diamantidis (2010–11)
- Kendrick Nunn (2024–25)

EuroLeague Final Four MVP

- Dominique Wilkins (1995–96)
- Željko Rebrača (1999–00)
- Dejan Bodiroga (2001–02)
- Dimitris Diamantidis (2006–07, 2010–11)
- Vassilis Spanoulis (2008–09)
- Kostas Sloukas (2023–24)

EuroLeague Best Defender

- Dimitris Diamantidis (2004–05, 2005–06, 2006–07, 2007–08, 2008–09, 2010–11)
- Stéphane Lasme (2012–13)

EuroLeague Top Scorer

- Nikos Galis (1993–94)

EuroLeague Coach of the Year Award

- Željko Obradović (2006–07, 2010–11)

Greek Basket League MVP

- Dejan Bodiroga (1998–99)
- Željko Rebrača (1999–00)
- Fragiskos Alvertis (2002–03)
- Jaka Lakovič (2004–05)
- Dimitris Diamantidis (2005–06, 2006–07, 2007–08, 2010–11, 2013–14)
- Vassilis Spanoulis (2008–09)
- Mike Batiste (2009–10)
- Stéphane Lasme (2012–13)
- Nick Calathes (2016–17, 2017–18, 2018–19)
- Ioannis Papapetrou (2020–21)
- Kostas Sloukas (2023–24)

Greek Basket League Finals MVP

- Dino Rađja (1997–98)
- Dejan Bodiroga (1998–99, 1999–00)
- Željko Rebrača (2000–01)
- Jaka Lakovič (2002–03, 2004–05)
- Nikos Chatzivrettas (2003–04)
- Dimitris Diamantidis (2005–06, 2006–07, 2007–08, 2008–09, 2013–14)
- Mike Batiste (2009–10)
- Stéphane Lasme (2012–13)
- Mike James (2016–17, 2017–18)
- Ioannis Papapetrou (2020–21)
- Mathias Lessort (2023–24)

Greek Cup MVP

- Dominique Wilkins (1995–96)
- Željko Rebrača (1999–00)
- Fragiskos Alvertis (2002–03)
- Jaka Lakovič (2004–05)
- Kostas Tsartsaris (2005–06, 2006–07, 2007–08)
- Dimitris Diamantidis (2008–09, 2015–16)
- Šarūnas Jasikevičius (2011–12)
- Roko Ukić (2012–13)
- Ramel Curry (2013–14)
- Loukas Mavrokefalidis (2014–15)
- James Feldeine (2016–17)
- Nick Calathes (2018-19)
- Ioannis Papapetrou (2020–21)
- Kostas Sloukas (2024–25)

Greek League Top Scorer

- Giorgos Kolokithas (1965–66, 1966–67)

Greek League Defensive Player of the Year

- Dimitris Diamantidis (2010–11)
- Stéphane Lasme (2012–13, 2013–14)
- Nick Calathes (2015-16, 2016-17, 2017-18)
- Howard Sant-Roos (2018-19, 2020-21)
- Jerian Grant (2023-24, 2024-25)

Greek League Top Rebounder

- David Stergakos (1987–88)
- Antonio Davis (1991–92)
- Dino Rađja (1997–98)

Greek League Assist Leader

- Nikos Galis (1992–93, 1993–94)
- Byron Dinkins (1995–96)
- Dimitris Diamantidis (2005–06, 2006–07, 2009–10, 2010–11, 2014-15)
- Vassilis Spanoulis (2007–08)
- Nick Calathes (2015-16, 2016-17, 2017-18, 2018-19, 2019-20)

Greek League Most Improved Player

- Nick Calathes (2010–11)
- Lefteris Mantzoukas (2022-23)

Greek League Coach of the Year

- Željko Obradović (2006–07, 2008–09, 2010–11)
- Argyris Pedoulakis (2012–13)
- Xavi Pascual (2016-17, 2017-18)
- Ergin Ataman (2023-24)

All-Greek League Team

- Kostas Tsartsaris (2003-04)
- Dimitris Diamantidis (2004-05, 2005-06, 2006-07, 2007-08, 2009-10, 2010-11, 2011-12, 2012-13, 2013-14, 2015-16)
- Jaka Lakovič (2004-05)
- Vassilis Spanoulis (2004-05, 2005-06, 2007-08, 2008-09)
- Ramūnas Šiškauskas (2006-07)
- Mike Batiste (2006-07, 2008-09, 2009-10, 2010-11, 2011-12)
- Šarūnas Jasikevičius (2008-09)
- Nikola Peković (2008-09)
- Drew Nicholas (2009-10)
- Stéphane Lasme (2012-13, 2013-14)
- Jonas Mačiulis (2013-14)
- Loukas Mavrokefalidis (2014-15)
- Chris Singleton (2016-17, 2017-18)
- Nick Calathes (2016-17, 2017-18, 2018-19)
- Ioannis Papapetrou (2018-19, 2020-21)
- Dinos Mitoglou (2020-21)
- Georgios Papagiannis (2020-21, 2021-22)
- Kostas Sloukas (2023-24)
- Mathias Lessort (2023-24)
- Juancho Hernangómez (2024-25)
- Kendrick Nunn (2023-24, 2024-25)

Greek League Most Spectacular Player

- Mike James (2016-17)
- Thanasis Antetokounmpo (2017-18, 2018-19)
- Mario Hezonja (2020-21)
- Mathias Lessort (2023-24)
- Kendrick Nunn (2024-25)

Greek League Best Young Player

- Antonis Fotsis (2000-01)
- Lefteris Mantzoukas (2022-23)

== Management ==
=== Ownership & Current Board ===
Position	Staff
Ownership	(Greece) Dimitrios Giannakopoulos
President	(Greece) Vassileios Parthenopoulos
General Manager	(Greece) Stavros Ntinos
Technical Director	(Greece) Nikos Pappas

=== Academies staff ===
Position	Name
Academies Director	(Greece) Argyris Pedoulakis
General Coach	(Greece) Georgios Kalaitzis

== Presidential history ==
Until 1992, the President of Panathinaikos A.C. was responsible for the management of the team. In 1992, the basketball department became professional, with its own President.

Years	President
1992–2000	Pavlos Giannakopoulos
2000–2002	Dimitris Panagoulias
2002–2003	Giorgos Panagoulias
2003–2012	Pavlos Giannakopoulos; Thanasis Giannakopoulos
2012–2014	Dimitris Giannakopoulos
2014–2020	Manos Papadopoulos
2020–2022	Panagiotis Triantopoulos
2022–present	Vassileios Parthenopoulos

== See also ==
- Panathinaikos women's basketball
