= Greek Basketball League awards =

Greek Basket League awards are the yearly individual awards that are given by the 1st-tier professional basketball league in Greece, the Greek Basketball League (GBL).

Since the 2014–15 season, the awards are voted on by the fans online, whereas previously they were not. The voting is currently decided by a ratio of 40% by the ballfans and the media, and 60% by the coaches and the captains of each of the teams of the Greek Basketball League. However, the Most Popular Player and Women's Favorite Player awards are decided exclusively by the fan's online voting.

== MVP ==
*	Member of the Naismith Memorial Basketball Hall of Fame
**	Member of the FIBA Hall of Fame
***	Member of both the Naismith and FIBA Halls of Fame

Season	MVP	Club
1987–88	(Greece) / (United States) Nikos Galis**	Aris
1988–89	(Greece) / (United States) Nikos Galis** (2×)	Aris
1989–90	(Greece) / (United States) Nikos Galis** (3×)	Aris
1990–91	(Greece) / (United States) Nikos Galis** (4×)	Aris
1991–92	(Greece) (United States) Nikos Galis** (5×)	Aris

== Regular season Performance Index Rating leader (2014–15 & 2015–16) ==
This list includes the regular season leaders in Performance Index Rating (PIR) of the Greek Basketball League, of the 2014–15 season and the 2015–16 season.

In the 2014–15 and 2015–16 seasons, the Greek Basketball League's regular season PIR leader was considered to be an unofficial statistical "MVP award", that was based solely on this statistic. This is not to be confused with the official Greek Basketball League MVP award, which is an award that is based on a voting process, and that is awarded at the end of each season's playoffs.

Source: widgets.baskethotel.com/site/esake

Season	Regular season PIR leader	Team
2014–15	(Bulgaria) / (Greece) Sasha Vezenkov	Aris
2015–16	(United States) Okaro White	Aris

== Finals MVP ==
*	Member of the Naismith Memorial Basketball Hall of Fame
**	Member of the FIBA Hall of Fame
***	Member of both the Naismith and FIBA Halls of Fame

Season	Finals MVP	Club
1987–88	(Greece) / (United States) Nikos Galis***	Aris
1988–89	(Greece) / (United States) Nikos Galis*** (2×)	Aris
1989–90	(Greece) / (United States) Nikos Galis*** (3×)	Aris
1990–91	(Greece) / (United States) Nikos Galis*** (4×)	Aris
1991–92	(Greece) Panagiotis Fasoulas**	PAOK

== Best Young Player ==
Season	Player	Club
1998–99	(Greece) Kostas Tsartsaris	Near East
1999–00	(Greece) Dimos Dikoudis	AEK
2000–01	(Greece) Antonis Fotsis	Panathinaikos
2001–02	(Greece) Nikos Zisis	AEK
2002–03	(Greece) Vassilis Spanoulis	Maroussi

== Defensive Player of the Year ==
Season	Player	Club
2006–07	(Greece) Michalis Pelekanos	Panellinios
2007–08	(Greece) Dimitris Diamantidis	Panathinaikos
2008–09	(Greece) Dimitris Diamantidis (2×)	Panathinaikos

== Most Improved Player ==
Season	Player	Club
2003–04	(Greece) Vassilis Spanoulis	Maroussi
2005–06	(Greece) Loukas Mavrokefalidis	PAOK
2009–10	(Greece) Kostas Kaimakoglou	Maroussi
2010–11	(Greece) / (United States) Nick Calathes	Panathinaikos
2011–12	(Greece) Georgios Printezis	Olympiacos

== Best Coach ==
Season	Coach	Club
1996–97	(Federal Republic of Yugoslavia) Dušan Ivković	Olympiacos
1997–98	(Slovenia) / (Greece) Lefteris Subotić	Panathinaikos
1998–99	(Slovenia) / (Greece) Lefteris Subotić (2×)	Panathinaikos
1999–00	(Federal Republic of Yugoslavia) Željko Obradović	Panathinaikos
2000–01	(Greece) Argyris Pedoulakis	Peristeri

== Most Spectacular Player ==
Most Spectacular Player
Season	Player	Team
2012–13	(United States) Brent Petway	Rethymno
2015–16	(United States) Okaro White	Aris
2016–17	(United States) Mike James	Panathinaikos
2017–18	(Greece) Thanasis Antetokounmpo	Panathinaikos
2018–19	(Greece) Thanasis Antetokounmpo (2×)	Panathinaikos

== Most Popular Player ==
- The Most Popular Player Award is given to the player that is voted as being the most popular player in the league.

Most Popular Player
Season	Player	Team
2014–15	(Greece) Vassilis Spanoulis	Olympiacos
2015–16	(Greece) Dimitris Diamantidis	Panathinaikos
2016–17	(Greece) Vassilis Spanoulis (2×)	Olympiacos
2017–18	(Greece) / (United States) Nick Calathes	Panathinaikos
2018–19	(Greece) / (United States) Nick Calathes (2×)	Panathinaikos

== Women's Favorite Player ==
- The Women's Favorite Player Award is given to the player that is voted as being the favorite player in the league, as chosen by female voters.

Women's Favorite Player
Season	Player	Team
2014–15	(Greece) Georgios Printezis	Olympiacos

== Greek League Best Five ==
- In some years there are actually 6 players selected to the team, due to the result of ties in the voting.

Best Five
Season	Player	Team
2003–04	(Bulgaria) / (United States) Roderick Blakney	Maroussi
2003–04	(Greece) Nikos Chatzis	AEK
2003–04	(Greece) Dimitris Diamantidis	Iraklis
2003–04	(Greece) Kostas Tsartsaris	Panathinaikos
2003–04	(Greece) Lazaros Papadopoulos	Iraklis

Best Five
Season	Player	Team
2004–05	(Slovenia) Jaka Lakovič	Panathinaikos
2004–05	(Greece) Vassilis Spanoulis	Panathinaikos
2004–05	(Greece) Dimitris Diamantidis (2×)	Panathinaikos
2004–05	(United States) Pete Mickeal	Makedonikos
2004–05	(Greece) Nikos Oikonomou	Panionios
2004–05	(United States) Travis Watson	Panionios

For a listing of all of the Greek Basketball League Pentad Best Five and Greek Basketball League Deka Best 10 teams,
