= Greek Basketball League full season statistical leaders =

The Greek Basketball League full season statistical leaders are the yearly full season (the regular season and the playoffs combined) statistical leaders of the top-tier level Greek Basketball League (GBL), since the league first held a playoffs round after the end of the regular season, starting with the 1986–87 season. The yearly full season stats leaders in each statistical category are listed by the number of total accumulated stats in a given full season, rather than by per game averages, and include both the league's regular season and the league's playoffs combined, as that is how the league counts its full season statistical leaders.

== Greek Basketball Championship Full Season Top Scorers (1986–87 season to 1991–92 season) ==
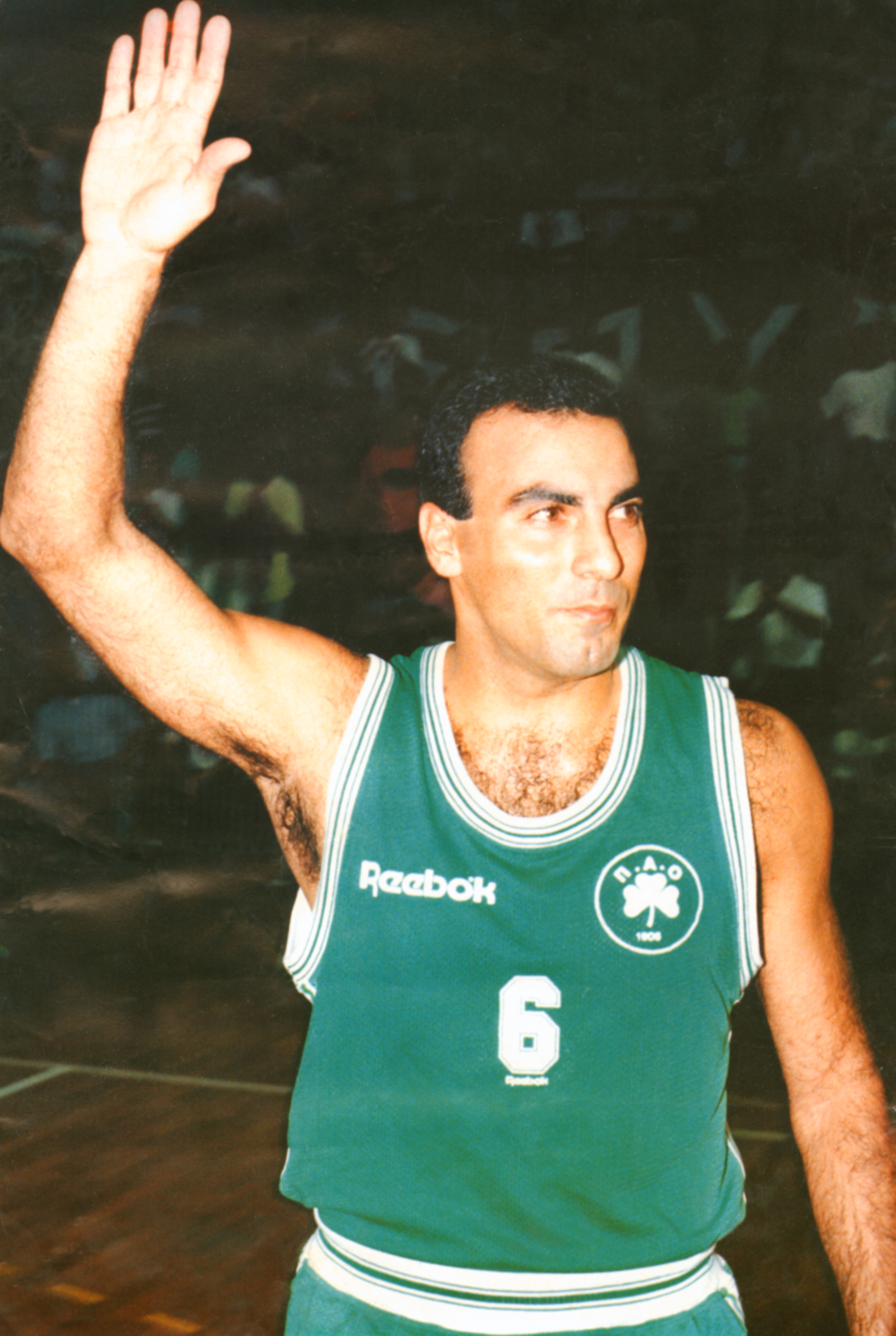
Nikos Galis was the Full Season Top Scorer of the amateur status Greek Basketball Championship, a record five consecutive times, from 1987 to 1991.

- The amateur status Greek Basketball Championship counted official full season statistical leaders by stats totals, and not by per game averages. It also counted the total stats for the both regular season and the playoffs combined. The league first held a playoffs round following the end of the 1986–87 regular season.
- This list includes all of the top scorers of each full season (the regular season and the playoffs combined) of the amateur status Greek Basketball Championship, from when the league first added a playoffs round, following the conclusion of the 1986–87 regular season.

Key
Player (X)	Name of the player and the number of times they had led the league in scoring at that point (if more than one).

Amateur Greek Alpha1 National Category Full Season Top Scorer (1986–87 season to 1991–92 season)
Season	Full Season Top Scorer (Regular Season + Playoffs)	Team	Total Points	Points Per Game
1986–87	(Greece) / (United States) Nikos Galis	Aris	715	38.5
1987–88	(Greece) / (United States) Nikos Galis (2×)	Aris	651	36.0
1988–89	(Greece) / (United States) Nikos Galis (3×)	Aris	641	37.1
1989–90	(Greece) / (United States) Nikos Galis (4×)	Aris	893	38.6
1990–91	(Greece) / (United States) Nikos Galis (5×)	Panathinaikos	813	34.7
1991–92	(Federal Republic of Yugoslavia) Žarko Paspalj	Olympiacos	741	30.0

== Greek Professional Basketball League Full Season Top Scorers (1992–93 season to present) ==
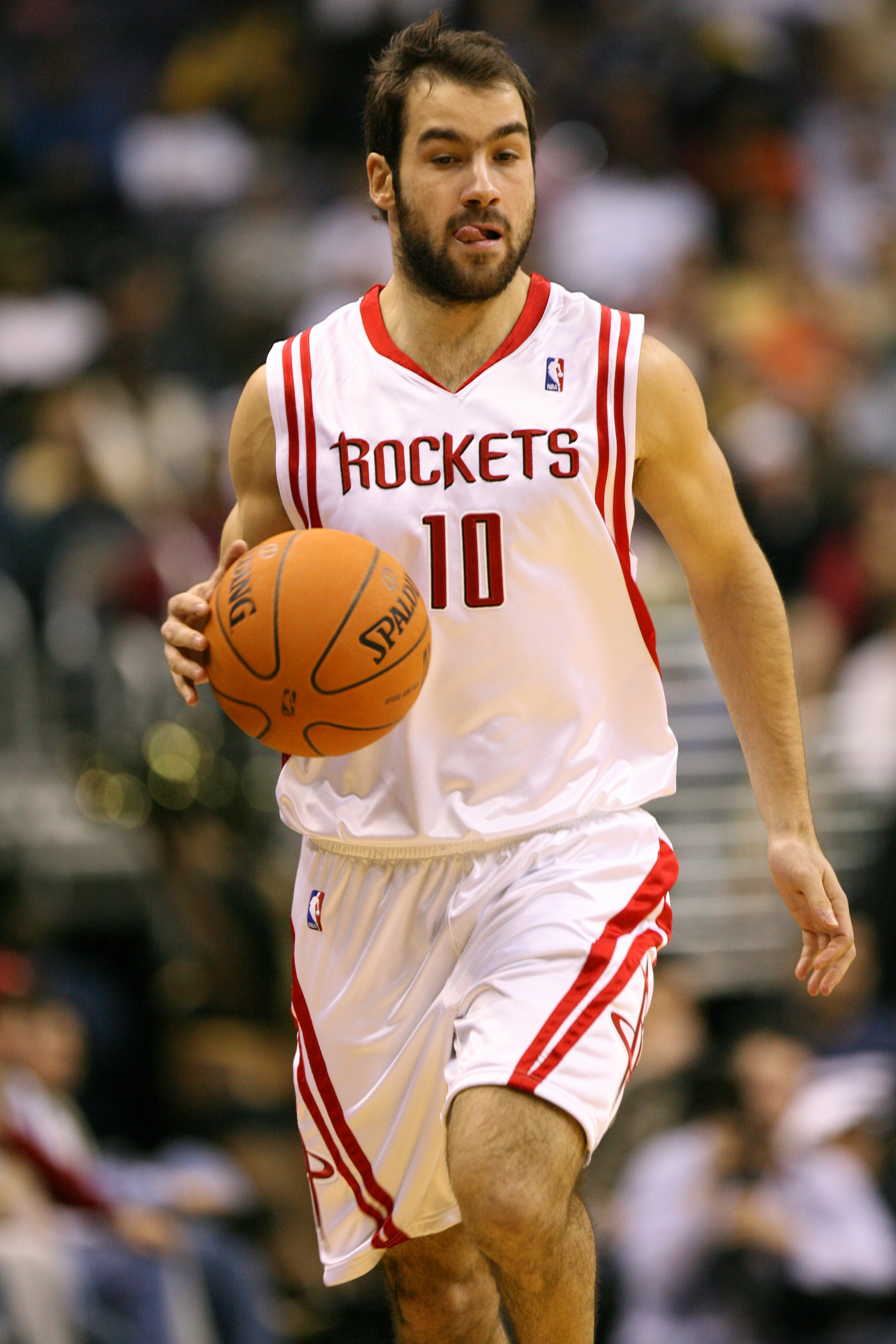
Vassilis Spanoulis was the professional status Greek Basketball League's Full Season Top Scorer in 2005.

Sasha Vezenkov was the professional status Greek Basketball League's Full Season Top Scorer three times, in 2015, 2022, 2025

- The professional status Greek Basketball League (GBL) counts official full season statistical leaders by stats totals, and not by per game averages. It also counts the total stats for the both regular season and the playoffs combined. The Professional Greek Basketball League (GBL) began with its inaugural 1992–93 season.
- This list includes all of the top scorers of each full season (the regular season and the playoffs combined) of the professional status Greek Basketball League (GBL), starting with the league's debut 1992–93 season.

Key
Player (X)	Name of the player and the number of times they had led the league in scoring at that point (if more than one).

Greek Basketball League Full Season Top Scorer (1992–93 season to present)
Season	Full Season Top Scorer (Regular Season + Playoffs)	Team	Total Points	Points Per Game
1992–93	(United States) Richard Rellford	Dafni	726	27.9
1993–94	(United States) Mitchell Wiggins	Milon	784	23.8
1994–95	(United States) Walter Berry	Iraklis	761	29.1
1995–96	(United States) Mitchell Wiggins	Sporting	782	31.4
1996–97	(United States) Alphonso Ford	Papagou	614	23.9
1997–98	(United States) Tony Dawson	Apollon Patras	678	22.7
1998–99	(United States) Alphonso Ford (2×)	Sporting	547	23.3
1999–00	(United States) Alphonso Ford (3×)	Peristeri	586	22.7
2000–01	(United States) Alphonso Ford (4×)	Peristeri	576	24.1
2001–02	(Greece) Nikos Chatzivrettas	Iraklis	578	22.1
2002–03	(Greece) Georgios Diamantopoulos	Panionios	635	26.7
2003–04	(Greece) Savvas Iliadis	Iraklis	677	18.8
2004–05	(Greece) Vassilis Spanoulis	Maroussi	558	15.9
2005–06	(Bulgaria) / (United States) Roderick Blakney	Maroussi	535	13.7
2006–07	(United States) / (North Macedonia) Kennedy Winston	Panionios	568	14.6
2007–08	(United States) Anthony Grundy	Panellinios	557	21.5
2008–09	(Bulgaria) / (United States) Kee Kee Clark	Aris	501	14.3
2009–10	(United States) Josh Childress	Olympiacos	475	15.8
2010–11	(Guyana) / (United States) Rawle Marshall	PAOK	546	16.5
2011–12	(United States) Dionte Christmas	Rethymno	484	18.6
2012–13	(Greece) / (Cyprus) Nikos Pappas	Panionios	589	16.8
2013–14	(United States) Errick McCollum	Panionios	620	17.7
2014–15	(Bulgaria) / (Greece) Sasha Vezenkov	Aris	622	16.8
2015–16	(United States) Jerel McNeal	Aris	485	14.1
2016–17	(United States) Will Cummings	Aris	450	14.5
2017–18	(United States) McKenzie Moore	Lavrio	427	17.1
2018–19	(United States) Vince Hunter	AEK Athens	508	13.7
2019–20	(United States) Conner Frankamp	Rethymno	397	20.9
2020–21	(United States) Tyson Carter	Lavrio	457	13.8
2021–22	(Bulgaria) / (Greece) Sasha Vezenkov (2×)	Olympiacos	450	15.5
2022–23	(United States) Marcus Denmon	Peristeri	513	16.0
2022–23	(United States) Alec Peters	Olympiacos	519	14.8
2024–25	(Bulgaria) / (Greece) Sasha Vezenkov (3×)	Olympiacos	496	18.4

== Full Season Performance Index Rating (PIR) leaders (since the 1993–94 season) ==
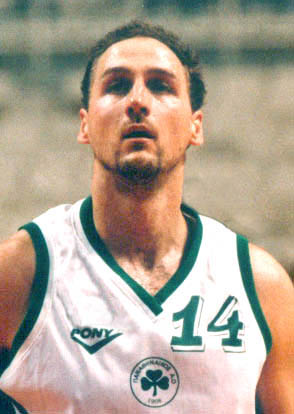
Dino Rađa

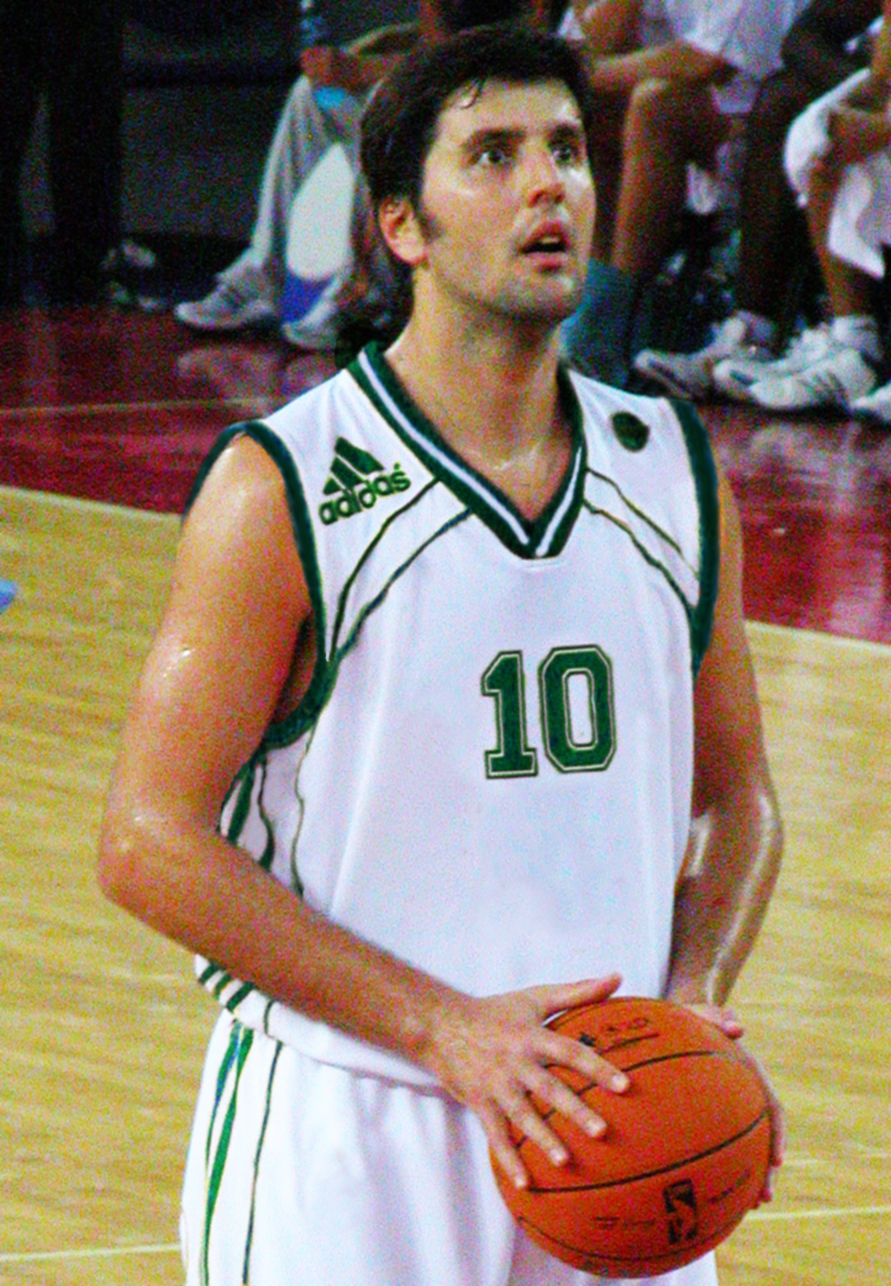
Dejan Bodiroga

- The Greek Basketball League (GBL) counts official statistical leaders by stats totals, and not by per game averages.
- This list includes all of the leaders in Performance Index Rating (PIR) of each full season (the regular season + the playoffs combined) of the Greek Basketball League (GBL), starting with the 1993–94 season.

Key
Player (X)	Name of the player and the number of times they had led the league in PIR at that point (if more than one).

Season	Full Season PIR Leader (Regular Season + Playoffs)	Team
1993–94	(United States) Roy Tarpley	Olympiacos
1994–95	(United States) Walter Berry	Iraklis
1995–96	(Croatia) Stojko Vranković	Panathinaikos
1996–97	(United States) Anthony Bonner	PAOK
1997–98	(Croatia) Dino Rađja	Panathinaikos
1998–99	(Federal Republic of Yugoslavia) Dejan Bodiroga	Panathinaikos
1999–00	(Federal Republic of Yugoslavia) Dejan Bodiroga (2×)	Panathinaikos
2000–01	(Croatia) Dino Rađja (2×)	Olympiacos
2001–02	(United States) Alphonso Ford	Olympiacos
2002–03	(North Macedonia) / (United States) Kenyon Jones	Maroussi
2003–04	(Greece) Dimitris Diamantidis	Iraklis
2004–05	(United States) Travis Watson	Panionios
2005–06	(North Macedonia) / (United States) Ryan Stack	Aris
2006–07	(United States) Andre Hutson	Panionios
2007–08	(North Macedonia) / (United States) Jeremiah Massey	Aris
2008–09	(Greece) Ioannis Bourousis	Olympiacos
2009–10	(Greece) Ian Vougioukas	Panellinios
2010–11	(Greece) Ioannis Bourousis (2×)	Olympiacos
2011–12	(United States) Dionte Christmas	Rethymno
2012–13	(United States) Brent Petway	Rethymno
2013–14	(United States) D. J. Cooper	PAOK
2014–15	(Bulgaria) / (Greece) Sasha Vezenkov	Aris
2015–16	(United States) Okaro White	Aris
2016–17	(United States) Chris Singleton	Panathinaikos
2017–18	(United States) McKenzie Moore	Lavrio
2018–19	(United States) Vince Hunter	AEK
2019–20	(Georgia (country)) / (United States) Conner Frankamp	Rethymno
2020–21	(United States) Jerian Grant	Promitheas
2021–22	(Bulgaria) / (Greece) Sasha Vezenkov (2×)	Olympiacos
2022–23	(Bulgaria) / (Greece) Sasha Vezenkov (3×)	Olympiacos
2023–24	(United States) Alec Peters	Olympiacos
2024–25	(Bulgaria) / (Greece) Sasha Vezenkov (4×)	Olympiacos

- In the 2014–15 and 2015–16 seasons, the Greek Basket League's regular season PIR leader was considered to be an unofficial statistical "MVP award", that was based solely on this statistic. This is not to be confused with the official Greek Basket League MVP award, which is an award that is based on a voting process, and that is awarded at the end of each season's playoffs.

Season	Regular season PIR Leader	Team
2014–15	(Bulgaria) / (Greece) Sasha Vezenkov	Aris
2015–16	(United States) Okaro White	Aris

== Full Season Total Rebounding leaders (since the 1986–87 season) ==
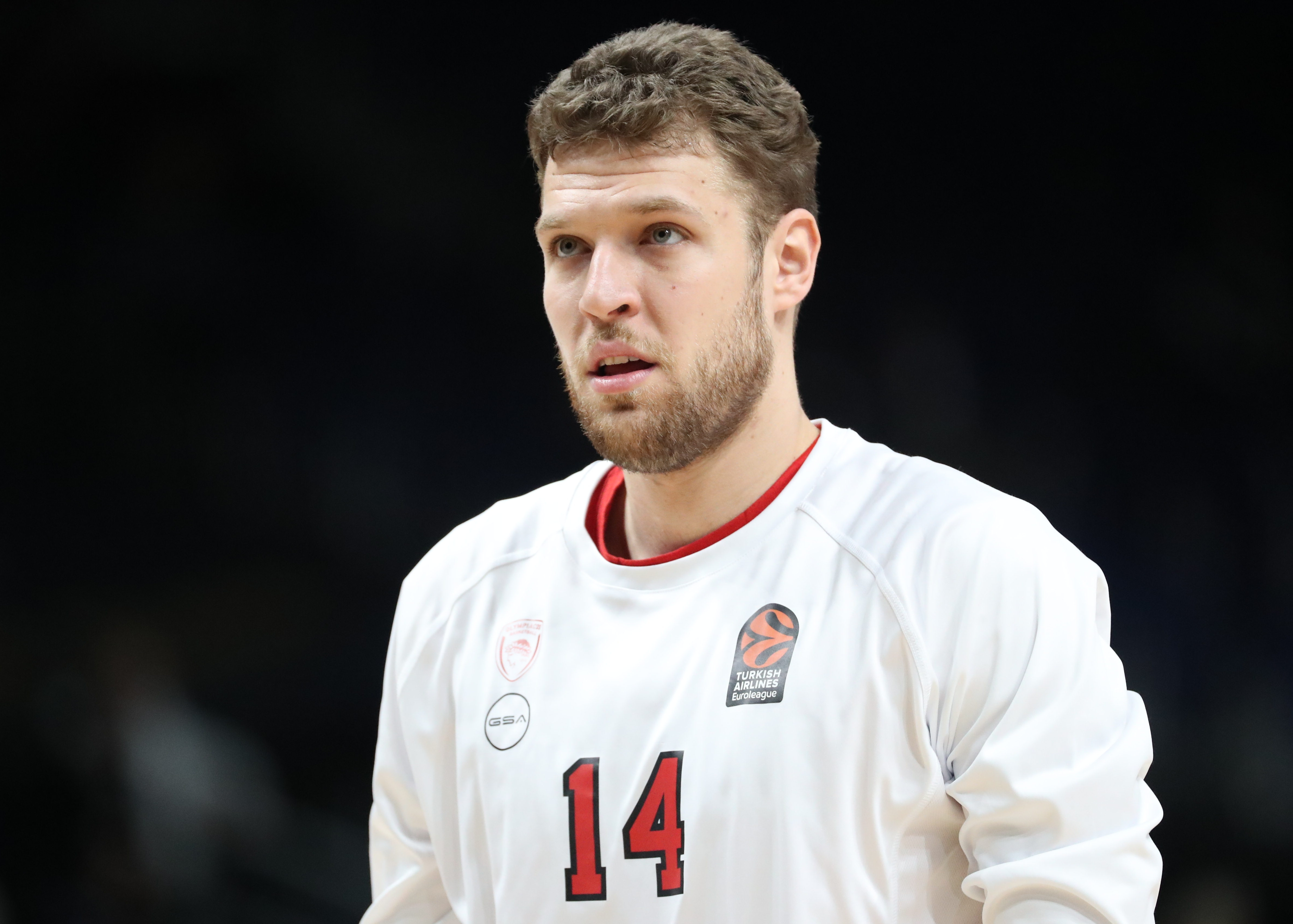
Sasha Vezenkov

- The Greek Basketball League (GBL) counts official statistical leaders by stats totals, and not by per game averages.
- This list includes all of the leaders in total rebounding of each full season (the regular season + the playoffs combined) of the Greek Basketball League (GBL), starting with the 1986–87 season.

Key
Player (X)	Name of the player and the number of times they had led the league in rebounding at that point (if more than one).

Season	Full Season Total Rebounding Leader (Regular Season + Playoffs)	Team	Total Rebounds	Rebounds per game
1986–87	(Greece) Panos Fasoulas	PAOK	654	15.5
1987–88	(Greece) / (United States) David Stergakos	Panathinaikos	421	12.2
1988–89	(United States) Mark Landsberger	Panionios	833	17.9
1989–90	(United States) Earl Harrison	Pagrati	648	15.3
1990–91	(United States) Earl Harrison (2×)	Pagrati	524	12.8
1991–92	(United States) Antonio Davis	Panathinaikos	617	14.6
Starting with the 1992–93 season, the league became fully professional.
1992–93	(United States) Roy Tarpley	Aris	825	17.2
1993–94	(Croatia) Stojko Vranković	Panathinaikos	373	11.4
1994–95	(United States) Walter Berry	Iraklis	471	13.9
1995–96	(Croatia) Stojko Vranković (2×)	Panathinaikos	565	15.3
1996–97	(United States) Anthony Bonner	PAOK	221	11.4
1997–98	(Croatia) Dino Rađja	Panathinaikos	246	12.7
1998–99	(Croatia) Dino Rađja (2×)	Panathinaikos	309	11.2
1999–00	(United States) James Forrest	Irakleio	304	11.3
2000–01	(Croatia) Dino Rađja (3×)	Olympiacos	400	11.4
2001–02	(Republic of Ireland) Pat Burke	Maroussi	304	9.8
2002–03	(United States) Ben Handlogten	Makedonikos	310	12.9
2003–04	(Greece) Lazaros Papadopoulos	Iraklis	318	8.5
2004–05	(United States) Travis Watson	Panionios	336	9.6
2005–06	(Greece) Loukas Mavrokefalidis	PAOK	226	7.7
2006–07	(United States) Andre Hutson	Panionios	284	8.6
2007–08	(Greece) Ioannis Bourousis	Olympiacos	295	7.9
2008–09	(Azerbaijan) / (United States) Spencer Nelson	Aris	241	7.2
2009–10	(Greece) Ian Vougioukas	Panellinios	208	5.9
2010–11	(Bulgaria) / (United States) Cedric Simmons	Kavala	281	10.0
2011–12	(Australia) Aron Baynes	Ikaros	199	8.6
2012–13	(Greece) Lazaros Papadopoulos (2×) & (Greece) Vlado Janković	PAOK & Panionios	213	8.1
2013–14	(United States) Kenny Gabriel	Rethymno	243	9.3
2014–15	(Bulgaria) / (Greece) Sasha Vezenkov	Aris	270	7.4
2015–16	(United States) Okaro White	Aris	253	7.2
2016–17	(United States) Keith Clanton	PAOK	286	9.5
2017–18	(United States) Gary McGhee	Kymis	193	7.7
2018–19	(Ghana) Ben Bentil	Peristeri	234	6.7
2019–20	(United States) Sean Evans	Ifaistos Limmou	186	9.3
2020–21	(Greece) Dinos Mitoglou	Panathinaikos	188	6.5
2021–22	(The Gambia) / (United States) Ousman Krubally	Larisa	318	9.1
2022–23	(Croatia) Miro Bilan	Peristeri	266	8.3

== Full Season Assists leaders (since the 1988–89 season) ==
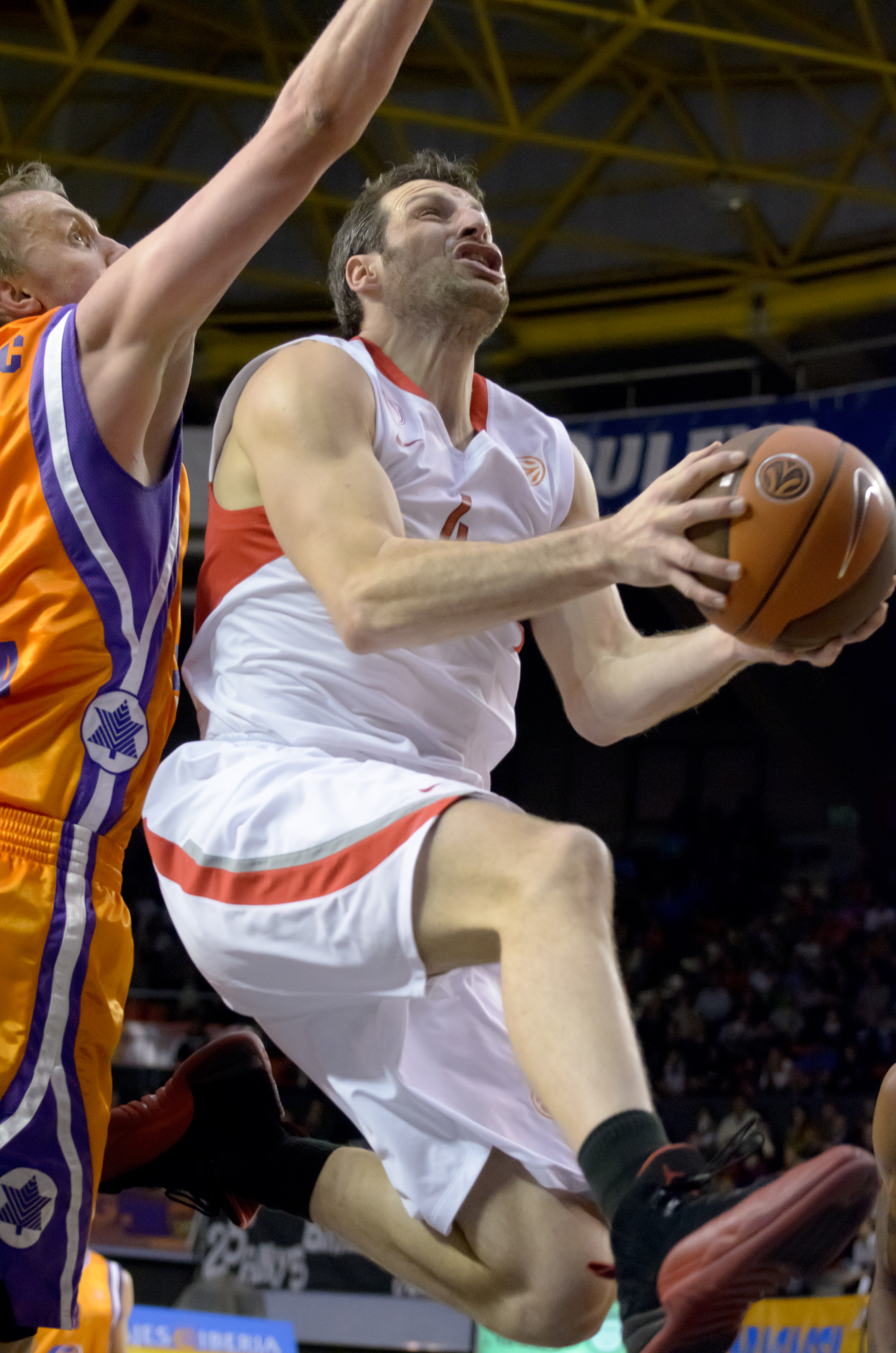
Theo Papaloukas, #4 in white and red

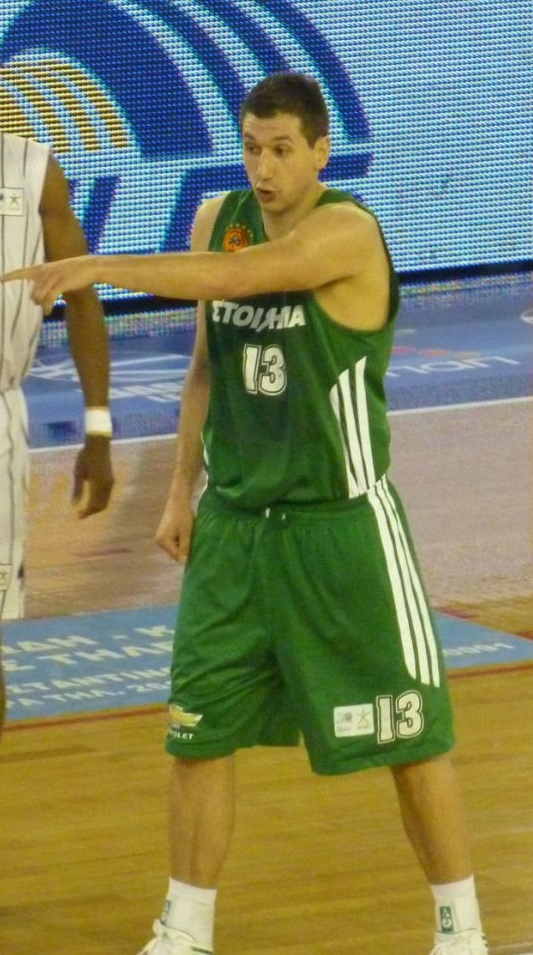
Dimitris Diamantidis

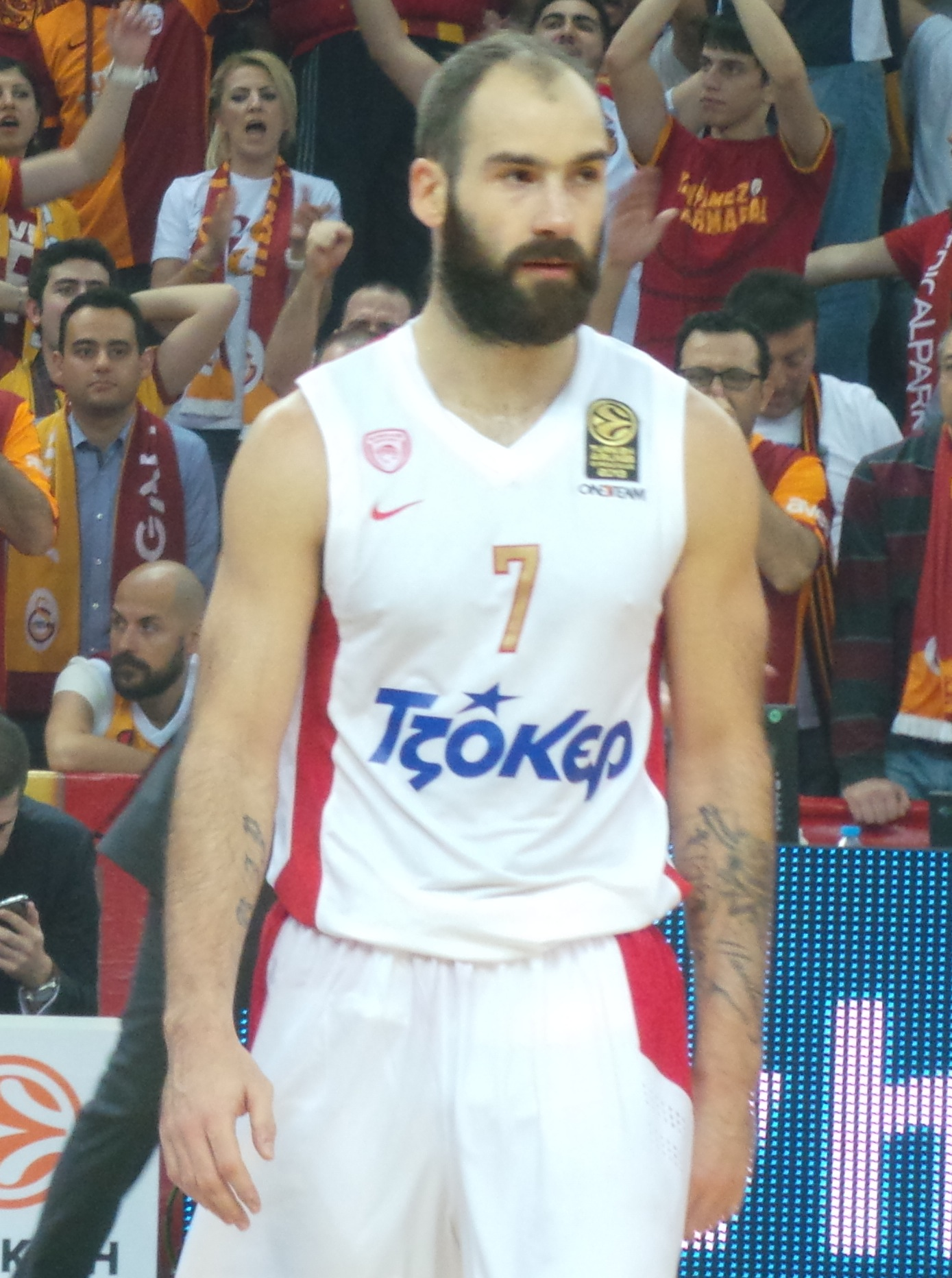
Vassilis Spanoulis

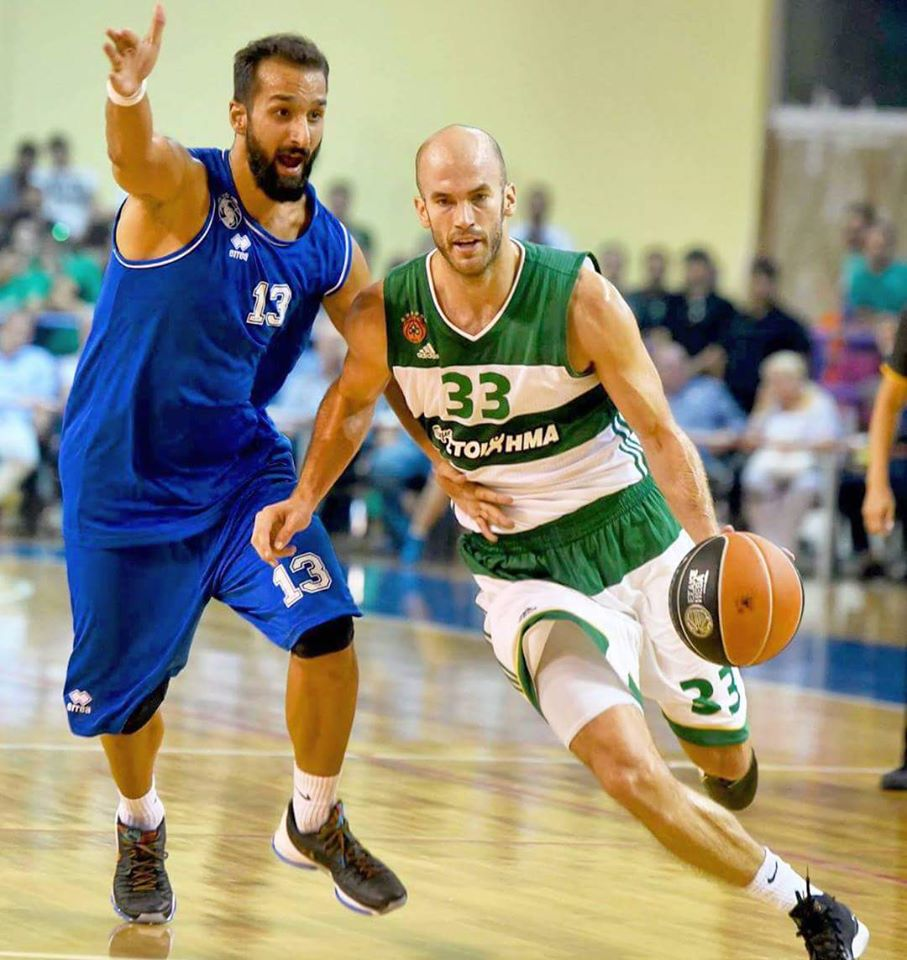
Nick Calathes, #33 in white and green

- The Greek Basketball League (GBL) counts official statistical leaders by stats totals, and not by per game averages.
- This list includes all of the leaders in assists of each full season (the regular season + the playoffs combined) of the Greek Basketball League (GBL), starting with the 1988–89 season.

Key
Player (X)	Name of the player and the number of times they had led the league in rebounding at that point (if more than one).

Season	Full Season Assists Leader (Regular Season + Playoffs)	Team	Total Assists	Assists per game
1988–89	(Greece) Panagiotis Giannakis	Aris	85	3.1
1989–90	(Greece) / (United States) Jon Korfas	PAOK	102	3.8
1990–91	(Greece) / (United States) Nikos Galis	Aris	134	4.8
1991–92	(Greece) / (United States) Nikos Galis (2×)	Aris	103	4.4
Starting with the 1992–93 season, the league became fully professional.
Season	Full Season Assists Leader (Regular Season + Playoffs)	Team	Total Assists	Assists per game
1992–93	(Greece) / (United States) Nikos Galis (3×)	Panathinaikos	209	5.8
1993–94	(Greece) / (United States) Nikos Galis (4×)	Panathinaikos	190	5.1
1994–95	(Greece) Lefteris Kakiousis	Iraklis	164	4.8
1995–96	(United States) Byron Dinkins	Panionios	112	5.2
1996–97	(Greece) Nikos Vetoulas	Apollon Patras	101	5.1
1997–98	(Greece) Nikos Vetoulas (2×)	Apollon Patras	214	5.8
1998–99	(United States) Frankie King	PAOK	104	4.5
1999–00	(Federal Republic of Yugoslavia) Dejan Bodiroga	Panathinaikos	138	4.1
2000–01	(Greece) Theo Papaloukas	Panionios	159	5.6
2001–02	(Greece) Theo Papaloukas (2×)	Olympiacos	137	4.1
2002–03	(Greece) Nikos Vetoulas (3×)	Ionikos NF	149	5.3
2003–04	(Croatia) Damir Mulaomerović	PAOK	193	6.8
2004–05	(Greece) Vassilis Spanoulis	Maroussi	138	3.9
2005–06	(Greece) Dimitris Diamantidis	Panathinaikos	129	3.7
2006–07	(Greece) Dimitris Diamantidis (2×)	Panathinaikos	176	4.8
2007–08	(Greece) Vassilis Spanoulis (2×)	Panathinaikos	158	4.3
2008–09	(Greece) Theo Papaloukas (3×)	Olympiacos	139	4.7
2009–10	(Greece) Dimitris Diamantidis (3×) & (United States) Jamon Gordon	Panathinaikos & Maroussi	148	4.9
2010–11	(Greece) Dimitris Diamantidis (4×)	Panathinaikos	153	4.3
2011–12	(Greece) Vassilis Spanoulis (3×)	Olympiacos	155	5.0
2012–13	(Greece) Vassilis Spanoulis (4×)	Olympiacos	189	5.7
2013–14	(United States) D. J. Cooper	PAOK	228	6.5
2014–15	(Greece) Dimitris Diamantidis (5×)	Panathinaikos	176	5.6
2015–16	(Greece) / (United States) Nick Calathes	Panathinaikos	214	6.5
2016–17	(Greece) / (United States) Nick Calathes (2×)	Panathinaikos	187	5.3
2017–18	(Greece) / (United States) Nick Calathes (3×)	Panathinaikos	241	6.9
2018–19	(Greece) / (United States) Nick Calathes (4×)	Panathinaikos	221	8.2
2019–20	(Greece) / (United States) Nick Calathes (5×)	Panathinaikos	137	7.2
2020–21	(United States) Jerian Grant	Promitheas Patras	182	6.7
2021–22	(Spain) / (Andorra) Quino Colom	AEK Athens	164	6.3
2022–23	(Greece) / (United States) Thomas Walkup	Olympiacos	171	5.5

== Greek Basketball League Full Season (Regular Season + Playoffs) Top 5 Scorers (1986–87 season to present) ==
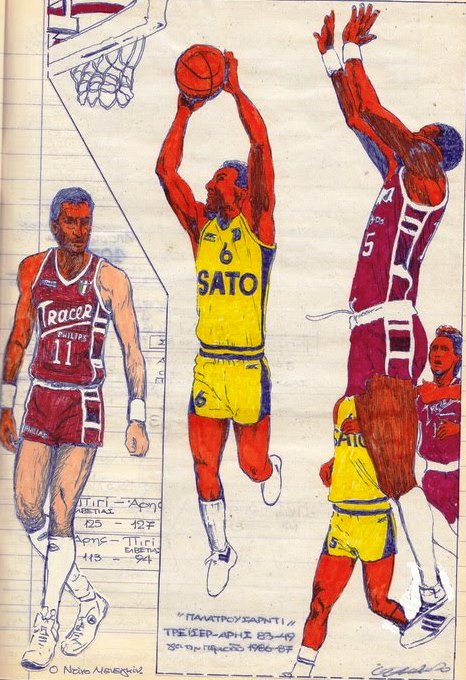
Nikos Galis

1986–87 season

Rank	Player	Team	Total Points Scored
1st	/ Nikos Galis	Aris	715 points
2nd	Vassilis Goumas	Ilysiakos	416 points
3rd	Kostas Petropoulos	Apollon Patras	378 points
4th	Takis Koroneos	Panionios	370 points
5th	Tzimis Maniatis	Olympiacos	345 points

1987–88 season

Rank	Player	Team	Total Points Scored
1st	/ Nikos Galis	Aris	651 points
2nd	Minas Gekos	AEK	404 points
3rd	Takis Koroneos	Panionios	401 points
4th	/ Jon Korfas	PAOK	365 points
5th	Tzimis Maniatis	Olympiacos	345 points

1988–89 season

Rank	Player	Team	Total Points Scored
1st	/ Nikos Galis	Aris	641 points
2nd	David Ancrum	Iraklis	552 points
3rd	Mike Jones	PAOK	510 points
4th	Mark Petteway	Apollon Patras	506 points
5th	Edgar Jones	Panathinaikos	456 points

1989–90 season

Rank	Player	Team	Total Points Scored
1st	/ Nikos Galis	Aris	893 points
2nd	David Ancrum	Iraklis	817 points
3rd	Wayne Yearwood	Apollon Patras	649 points
4th	Todd Mitchell	Olympiacos	624 points
5th	Edgar Jones	Panathinaikos	600 points

1990–91 season

Rank	Player	Team	Total Points Scored
1st	/ Nikos Galis	Αris	813 points
2nd	David Ancrum	Iraklis	750 points
3rd	John Hudson	Panionios	589 points
4th	Earl Harrison	Pagrati	567 points
5th	Angelos Koronios	Peristeri	562 points

1991–92 season

Rank	Player	Team	Total Points Scored
1st	Žarko Paspalj	Olympiacos	741 points
2nd	David Ancrum	Iraklis	682 points
3rd	Derreck Hamilton	Sporting	613 points
4th	Earl Harrison	Pagrati	560 points
5th	Melvin Cheatum	Dafni	557 points

1992–93 season

Rank	Player	Team	Total Points Scored
1st	Richard Rellford	Dafni	726 points
2nd	Žarko Paspalj	Olympiacos	653 points
3rd	/ Nikos Galis	Panathinaikos	615 points
4th	Arijan Komazec	Panathinaikos	602 points
5th	Lucius Davis	Apollon Patras	528 points

1993–94 season

Rank	Player	Team	Total Points Scored
1st	Mitchell Wiggins	Milon	784 points
2nd	Henry Turner	Panionios	691 points
3rd	/ Nikos Galis	Panathinaikos	622 points
4th	Walter Berry	PAOK	596 points
5th	Derrick Chievous	Dafni	595 points

1994–95 season

Rank	Player	Team	Total Points Scored
1st	Walter Berry	Iraklis	761 points
2nd	Tony White	Aris	701 points
3rd	Lawrence Funderburke	Ampelokipoi	627 points
4th	Mitchell Wiggins	Sporting	626 points
5th	Travis Mays	Panionios	602 points

1995–96 season

Rank	Player	Team	Total Points Scored
1st	Mitchell Wiggins	Sporting	782 points
2nd	Lucius Davis	Papagou	663 points
3rd	Richard Rellford	Irakleio	644 points
4th	Buck Johnson	Apollo Patras	572 points
5th	Marlon Maxey	Gymnastikos S. Larissas	542 points

1996–97 season

Rank	Player	Team	Total Points Scored
1st	Alphonso Ford	Papagou	614 points
2nd	Angelos Koronios	Peristeri	499 points
3rd	Andrés Guibert	Sporting	497 points
4th	Bill Edwards	AEK	484 points
5th	Harold Ellis	Apollon Patras	472 points

1997–98 season

Rank	Player	Team	Total Points Scored
1st	Tony Dawson	Apollo Patras	678 points
2nd	Frankie King	Panionios	660 points
3rd	/ Peja Stojaković	PAOK	574 points
4th	Dino Radja	Panathinaikos	546 points
5th	Dyron Nix	Irakleio	469 points

1998–99 season

Rank	Player	Team	Total Points Scored
1st	Alphonso Ford	Sporting	582 points
2nd	Dejan Bodiroga	Panathinaikos	547 points
3rd	Erik Meek	Maroussi	531 points
4th	Shane Heal	Near East	509 points
5th	Walter Berry	PAOK	487 points

1999–00 season

Rank	Player	Team	Total Points Scored
1st	Alphonso Ford	Peristeri	586 points
2nd	James Forrest	Irakleio	550 points
3rd	Shane Heal	Near East	531 points
4th	Dejan Bodiroga	Panathinaikos	452 points
5th	Ashraf Amaya	Maroussi	446 points

2000–01 season

Rank	Player	Team	Total Points Scored
1st	Alphonso Ford	Peristeri	576 points
2nd	Georgios Diamantopoulos	Panionios	486 points
3rd	James Forrest	Aris	478 points
4th	Nikos Chatzivrettas	Iraklis	478 points
5th	Jimmy Oliver	Maroussi	462 points

2001–02 season

Rank	Player	Team	Total Points Scored
1st	Nikos Chatzivrettas	Iraklis	578 points
2nd	Buck Johnson	Dafni	560 points
3rd	Jimmy Oliver	Maroussi	543 points
4th	Alphonso Ford	Olympiacos	540 points
5th	Norman Nolan	PAOK	522 points

2002–03 season

Rank	Player	Team	Total Points Scored
1st	Georgios Diamantopoulos	Panionios	635 points
2nd	Nestoras Kommatos	PAOK	549 points
3rd	Willie Solomon	Aris	509 points
4th	Doremus Bennerman	Irakelio	467 points
5th	Georgios Pavlidis	Iraklis	447 points

2003–04 season

Rank	Player	Team	Total Points Scored
1st	Savvas Iliadis	Iraklis	677 points
2nd	Nestoras Kommatos	Aris	543 points
3rd	/ Ruben Douglas	Panionios	521 points
4th	Damir Mulaomerović	PAOK	516 points
5th	/ Willie Deane	Ilysiakos	476 points
6th	Jamel Thomas	Apollon Patras	472 points

2004–05 season

Rank	Player	Team	Total Points Scored
1st	Vassilis Spanoulis	Maroussi	558 points
2nd	Nikos Oikonomou	Panionios	474 points
3rd	Panagiotis Liadelis	Apollo Patras	451 points
4th	Dylan Page	MENT	440 points
5th	Tyrone Grant	Olympia Larissa	406 points

2005–06 season

Rank	Player	Team	Total Points Scored
1st	/ Roderick Blakney	Maroussi	535 points
2nd	Damir Mulaomerović	Panellinios	487 points
3rd	William Avery	Panionios	454 points
4th	Loukas Mavrokefalidis	PAOK	429 points
5th	Kostas Charalampidis	Makedonikos	401 points
6th	Chris Garner	Gymnastikos S. Larissas	400 points

2006–07 season

Rank	Player	Team	Total Points Scored
1st	Kennedy Winston	Panionios	568 points
2nd	/ Kee Kee Clark	Aigaleo	490 points
3rd	Arthur Lee	AEL 1964	448 points
4th	Ivo Josipović	Apollon Patras	391 points
5th	Vlado Šćepanović	PAOK	384 points

2007–08 season

Rank	Player	Team	Total Points Scored
1st	Anthony Grundy	Panellinios	557 points
2nd	/ Jeremiah Massey	Aris	450 points
3rd	Billy Keys	AEL 1964	442 points
4th	/ J. R. Pinnock	Kolossos Rodou	389 points
5th	Makis Nikolaidis	Aigaleo	384 points

2008–09 season

Rank	Player	Team	Total Points Scored
1st	/ Kee Kee Clark	Aris	501 points
2nd	Anthony Grundy	Panellinios	424 points
3rd	Mike Batiste	Panathinaikos	422 points
4th	Loukas Mavrokefalidis	Maroussi	421 points
5th	Nikola Peković	Panathinaikos	389 points

2009–10 season

Rank	Player	Team	Total Points Scored
1st	Josh Childress	Olympiacos	391 points
2nd	Lance Harris	Kolossos Rodou	372 points
3rd	/ Taurean Green	AEK	366 points
4th	Kenny Gregory	PAOK	363 points
5th	Chris Monroe	PAOK	363 points

2010–11 season

Rank	Player	Team	Total Points Scored
1st	/ Rawle Marshall	PAOK	448 points
2nd	/ Pat Calathes	Kolossos Rodou	387 points
3rd	/ Milt Palacio	Kavala	377 points
4th	/ Deon Thompson	Ikaros Kallitheas	352 points
5th	/ Jimmy Baxter	Ilysiakos	350 points

2011–12 season

Rank	Player	Team	Total Points Scored
1st	Dionte Christmas	Rethymno	437 points
2nd	Dimos Dikoudis	PAOK	361 points
3rd	Kostas Charalampidis	KAOD	344 points
4th	Christos Tapoutos	Aris	329 points
5th	Nestoras Kommatos	Maroussi	326 points

2012–13 season

Rank	Player	Team	Total Points Scored
1st	/ Nikos Pappas	Panionios	441 points
2nd	Errick McCollum	Apollon Patras	402 points
3rd	Nikos Liakopoulos	Elefsina	399 points
4th	William Coleman	Kavala	359 points
5th	Terrell Stoglin	Ilysiakos	359 points

2013–14 season

Rank	Player	Team	Total Points Scored
1st	Errick McCollum	Panionios	466 points
2nd	Chris Evans	Trikala Aries	412 points
3rd	J'Covan Brown	KAOD	397 points
4th	(United States Virgin Islands) / Ivan Aska	Ikaros Chalkidas	380 points
5th	Lazeric Jones	KAOD	357 points

2014–15 season

Rank	Player	Team	Total Points Scored
1st	/ Sasha Vezenkov	Aris	622 points
2nd	Muhammad El-Amin	Apollon Patras	373 points
3rd	Dimitris Mavroeidis	Nea Kifisia	363 points
4th	Carl English	AEK	351 points
5th	Theodoros Zaras	KAOD	331 points
