= Michael Batiste =

American basketball player and coach

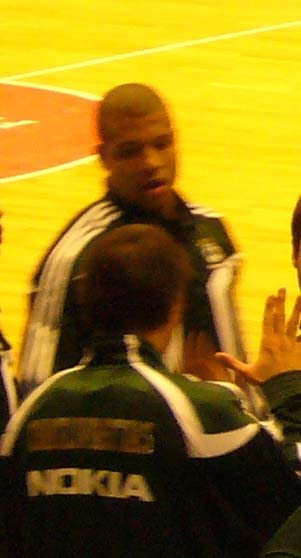
- Batiste in 2007

Panathinaikos
- Title: Assistant coach
- League: Greek Basketball League; EuroLeague

Personal information
- Born: November 21, 1977 (age 48) Inglewood, California, U.S.
- Listed height: 6 ft 8 in (2.03 m)
- Listed weight: 245 lb (111 kg)

Career information
- High school: Wilson (Long Beach, California)
- College: Long Beach CC (1995–1996); Arizona State (1996–1999)
- NBA draft: 1999: undrafted
- Playing career: 2000–2014
- Position: Center / power forward
- Number: 8, 24
- Coaching career: 2014–present

Career history

Playing
- 2000–2001: Spirou Charleroi
- 2001–2002: Lauretana Biella
- 2002–2003: Memphis Grizzlies
- 2003–2012: Panathinaikos
- 2012–2013: Fenerbahçe Ülker
- 2013–2014: Panathinaikos

Coaching
- 2014–2016: Canton Charge (assistant)
- 2016–2017: Brooklyn Nets (player development assistant)
- 2017–2018: Charlotte Hornets (assistant)
- 2018–2021: Orlando Magic (assistant)
- 2021–2022: Washington Wizards (assistant)
- 2022–2023: Houston Rockets (assistant)
- 2023–2026: Toronto Raptors (assistant)
- 2026–present: Panathinaikos (assistant)

Career highlights
- As player: 3× EuroLeague champion (2007, 2009, 2011); All-EuroLeague First Team (2011); All-EuroLeague Second Team (2012); EuroLeague 25th Anniversary Team (2025); 101 Greats of European Basketball (2018); Greek League Hall of Fame (2022); 9× Greek League champion (2004–2011, 2014); 7× Greek Cup winner (2005–2009, 2012, 2014); Greek League MVP (2010); 2× Greek League Finals MVP (2010, 2011); 5× All-Greek League Team (2007, 2009, 2010–2012); 6× Greek All-Star (2005, 2006, 2008–2011); Turkish Cup winner (2013); First-team All-Pac-10 (1999)
- Stats at NBA.com
- Stats at Basketball Reference

Michael James Batiste (born November 21, 1977) is an American professional basketball coach and former player who is currently an assistant coach for Panathinaikos of the Greek Basketball League (GBL) and the EuroLeague. A two-time All-EuroLeague selection, Batiste won three EuroLeague championships in 2007, 2009, and 2011 with the Greek Basket League club Panathinaikos. In 2018, he was named one of the 101 Greats of European Basketball. He was inducted into the Greek Basket League Hall of Fame in 2022.

== College career ==
Batiste played college basketball for Long Beach City College and Arizona State University. With the Arizona State Sun Devils, he led the Pacific-10 Conference (Pac-10) in blocked shots during the 1997–98 season, and was named first-team All-Pac-10 for the 1998–99 season.

== Professional career ==
After leaving Arizona State, Batiste had a European stint, representing Spirou Charleroi in the Belgian League (2000–01) and Lauretana Biella (2001–02) in the Italian League.

During the 2002–03 NBA season, Batiste played with the Memphis Grizzlies. In 75 games played, he averaged 6.4 points per game and 3.4 rebounds per game, in 16.6 minutes per game. He was also signed by the Los Angeles Clippers in September 2002, but he was waived before playing in any regular season games.

In July 2003, following his NBA season, Batiste joined the Greek powerhouse Panathinaikos Athens, and he then played a major role in a team that won 8 consecutive Greek League championships (2004, 2005, 2006, 2007, 2008, 2009, 2010, 2011) and 5 consecutive Greek Cups (2005–2009). With Panathinaikos, he also won the EuroLeague championship, by winning the EuroLeague Final Four, in 2007, 2009, and 2011, and the coveted Triple Crown in both 2007 and 2009. In 2010, he was named the Greek League MVP.

On July 13, 2012, Batiste signed a one-year contract with the Turkish Super League team Fenerbahçe Ülker. He won the Turkish Cup with Fenerbahçe.

On August 7, 2013, Batiste signed a contract for the next season with his ex-team Panathinaikos. He retired from playing professional basketball, at the end of the 2013–14 season.

== Coaching career ==
After he retired from playing professional basketball in 2014, Batiste began a career working as a basketball coach. He started his coaching career as assistant coach with the Canton Charge of the NBA G League On July 5, 2016, Batiste was hired as a player development assistant for the Brooklyn Nets. On June 7, 2017, Batiste was hired as an assistant coach of the Charlotte Hornets. On June 26, 2018, Batiste was hired by the Orlando Magic as an assistant coach.

Batiste joined the Washington Wizards coaching staff for the 2021–22 NBA season. On February 10, 2022, he was suspended for two games without pay after attempting to confront a fan three days earlier, during a 100–121 loss to the Miami Heat.

On July 3, 2022, the Houston Rockets hired Batiste as an assistant coach.

On July 4, 2023, the Toronto Raptors hired Batiste as an assistant coach.

== Career statistics ==
Legend
GP	Games played	GS	Games started	MPG	Minutes per game
FG%	Field-goal percentage	3P%	3-point field-goal percentage	FT%	Free-throw percentage
RPG	Rebounds per game	APG	Assists per game	SPG	Steals per game
BPG	Blocks per game	PPG	Points per game	PIR	Performance index rating
**Bold**	Career high

=== NBA ===
==== Regular season ====
Year	Team	GP	GS	MPG	FG%	3P%	FT%	RPG	APG	SPG	BPG	PPG
2002–03	Memphis	75	2	16.6	.422	.222	.784	3.4	.7	.6	.2	6.4
Career		75	2	16.6	.422	.222	.784	3.4	.7	.6	.2	6.4

=== EuroLeague ===
†	Denotes season in which Batiste won the EuroLeague
*	Led the league

Year	Team	GP	GS	MPG	FG%	3P%	FT%	RPG	APG	SPG	BPG	PPG	PIR
2000–01	Charleroi	10	9	**28.6**	.500	.300	.765	**9.2**	.4	.9	.3	**16.1**	16.0
2003–04	Panathinaikos	16	6	16.8	.439	.333	.793	3.2	.4	.8	.2	7.9	7.2
2004–05	Panathinaikos	24	21	23.9	.546	.355	.731	4.8	.7	1.0	.2	11.4	11.8
2005–06	Panathinaikos	23	**22**	25.9	**.641***	.364	.679	6.6	.6	**1.4**	.5	13.3	17.1
2006–07†	Panathinaikos	19	13	22.3	.627	.222	.746	6.1	.5	.9	.5	12.8	15.5
2007–08	Panathinaikos	19	12	24.5	.623	.000	.776	5.3	.7	.8	.3	11.9	13.7
2008–09†	Panathinaikos	22	14	22.7	.635	.125	.728	4.9	.3	.9	.4	12.5	14.8
2009–10	Panathinaikos	11	6	**28.6**	.615	.167	.735	5.7	**.8**	.6	.5	15.5	**17.5**
2010–11†	Panathinaikos	20	13	26.5	.590	.000	.727	5.5	**.8**	.8	**.9**	13.3	14.6
2011–12	Panathinaikos	23*	13	20.7	.477	**.500**	**.814**	4.6	.7	.7	.3	9.7	9.6
2012–13	Fenerbahçe	23	16	15.8	.482	.333	.786	2.7	.3	.6	.1	5.4	4.5
2013–14	Panathinaikos	**27**	1	8.3	.463	.167	.692	1.5	.4	.1	.0	3.5	2.5
Career		237	145	21.0	.564	.283	.742	4.7	.5	.8	.3	10.5	11.4

== Awards and achievements ==
- 9× Greek League Champion: (2004, 2005, 2006, 2007, 2008, 2009, 2010, 2011, 2014)
- 7× Greek Cup Winner: (2005, 2006, 2007, 2008, 2009, 2012, 2014)
- 6× Greek League All-Star (2005, 2006, 2008–2011)
- 3× All-Greek League Second Team: (2005, 2006, 2008)
- 2× EuroLeague MVP of the Week: 2005–06 (Regular Season, Week 10), 2008–09 (Top 16, Week 6)
- EuroLeague MVP of the Month: (November 2006)
- 3× EuroLeague Champion: (2007, 2009, 2011)
- 5× Greek League Best Five: (2007, 2009, 2010, 2011, 2012)
- 2× Triple Crown Winner: (2007, 2009)
- Greek League MVP: (2010)
- 2× Greek League Finals MVP: (2010, 2011)
- All-EuroLeague First Team: (2011)
- EuroLeague Finals Top Scorer: (2011)
- All-EuroLeague Second Team: (2012)
- Turkish Cup Winner: 2013
- 101 Greats of European Basketball: (2018)
- Greek Basket League Hall of Fame: (2022)
