= Greek Basketball League Finals MVP =

Sports

The Greek Basketball League (GBL) Finals MVP, or Greek League Finals MVP award (Greek: Ελληνικού Α1 Μπάσκετ Πρωταθλήματος Tελικός MVP) is the yearly Finals MVP award for the playoff finals of the 1st-tier professional basketball league in Greece, the Greek Basketball League (GBL). Historically, the MVP of the Greek Basketball League Finals usually goes to the player that has the highest Performance Index Rating (PIR) stat, over the course of the Finals series, in combination with his team also winning the Greek Basketball League (GBL).

== Greek Basketball League Finals MVP award winners ==
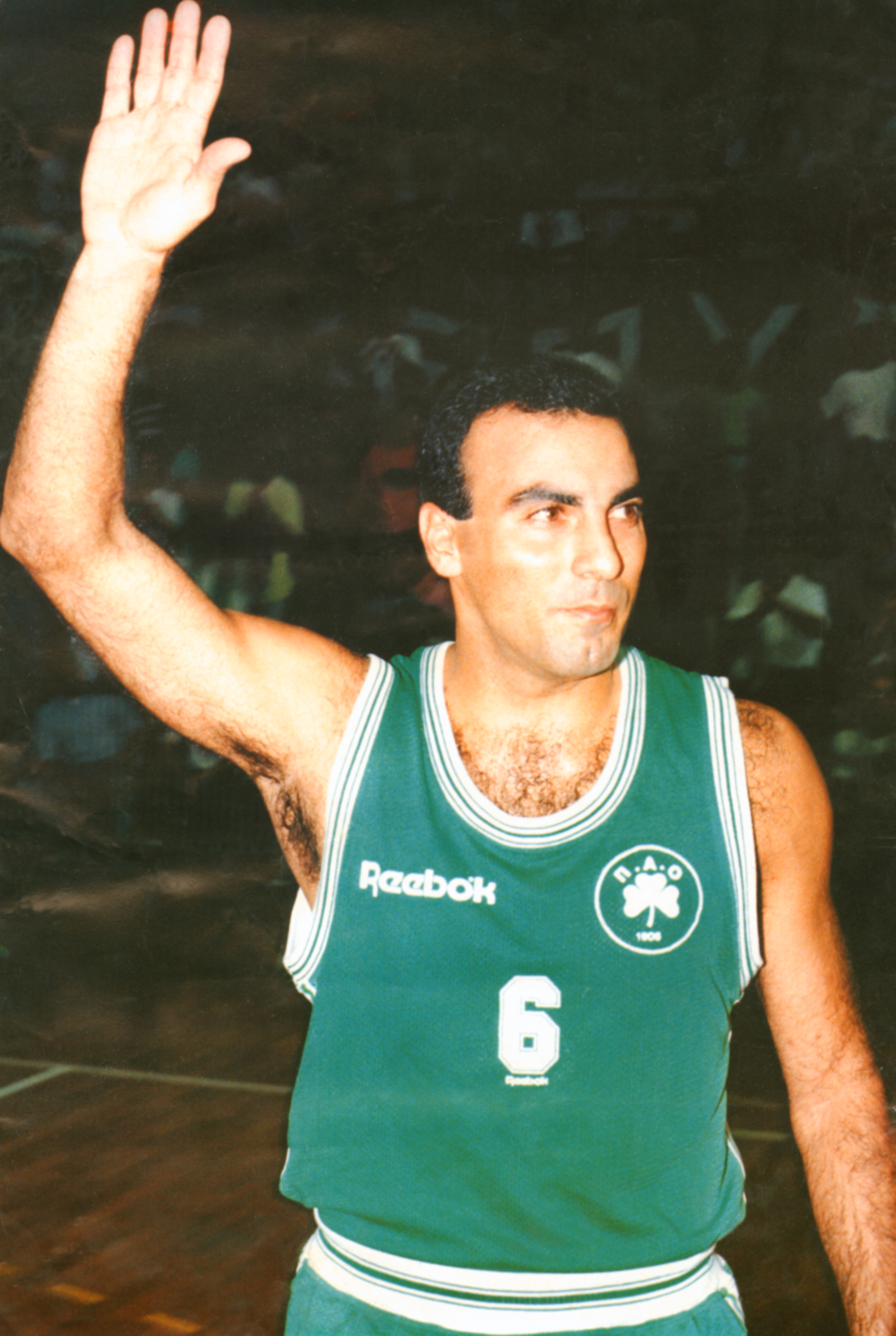
Nikos Galis was the Greek Basketball League Finals MVP four times (1988–1991).

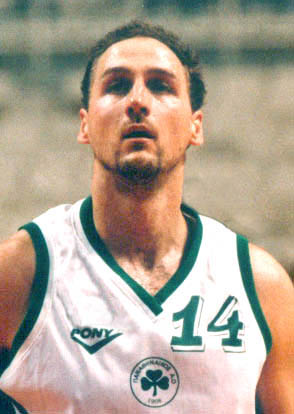
Dino Rađja was the Greek Basketball League Finals MVP in 1998.

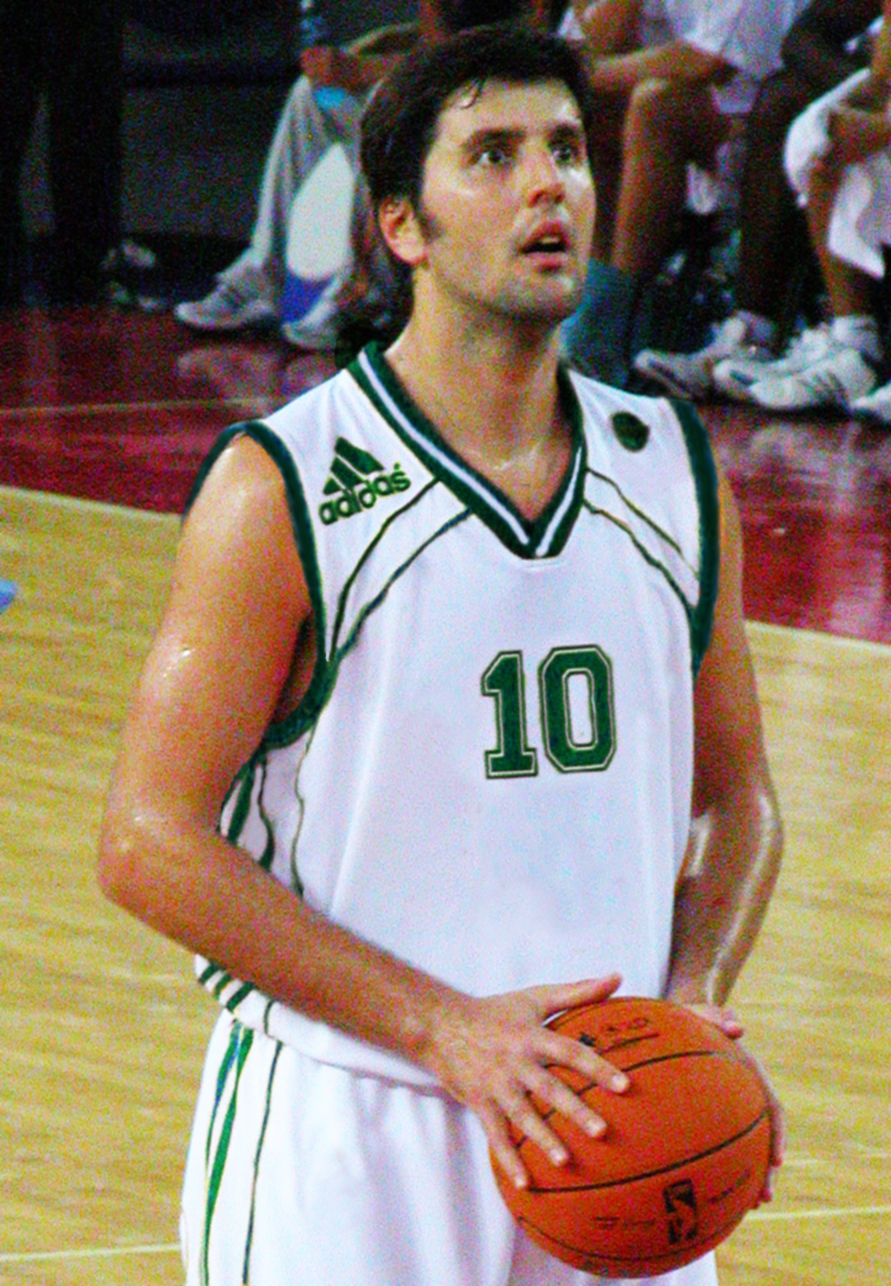
Dejan Bodiroga was the Greek Basketball League Finals MVP two times (1999, 2000).

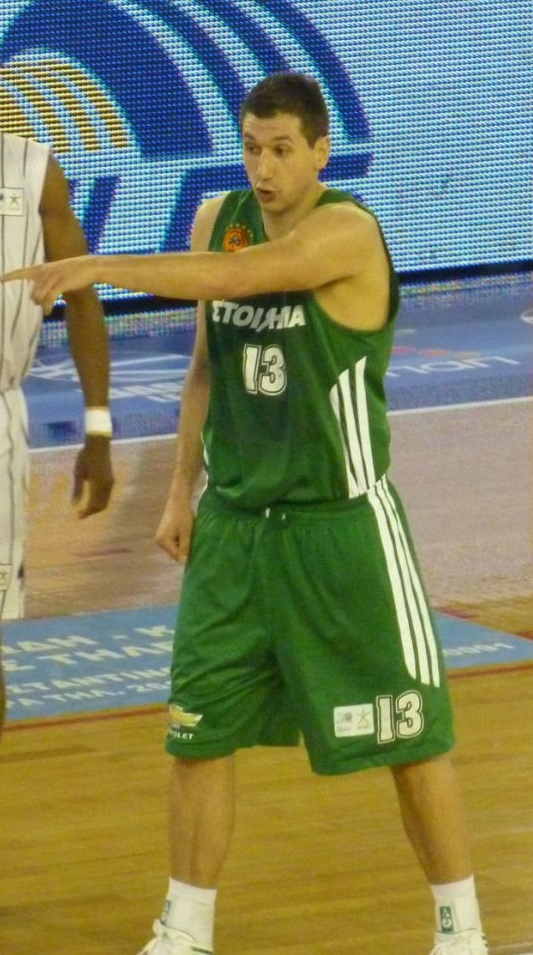
Dimitris Diamantidis was the Greek Basketball League Finals MVP four times (2006, 2007, 2011, 2014).

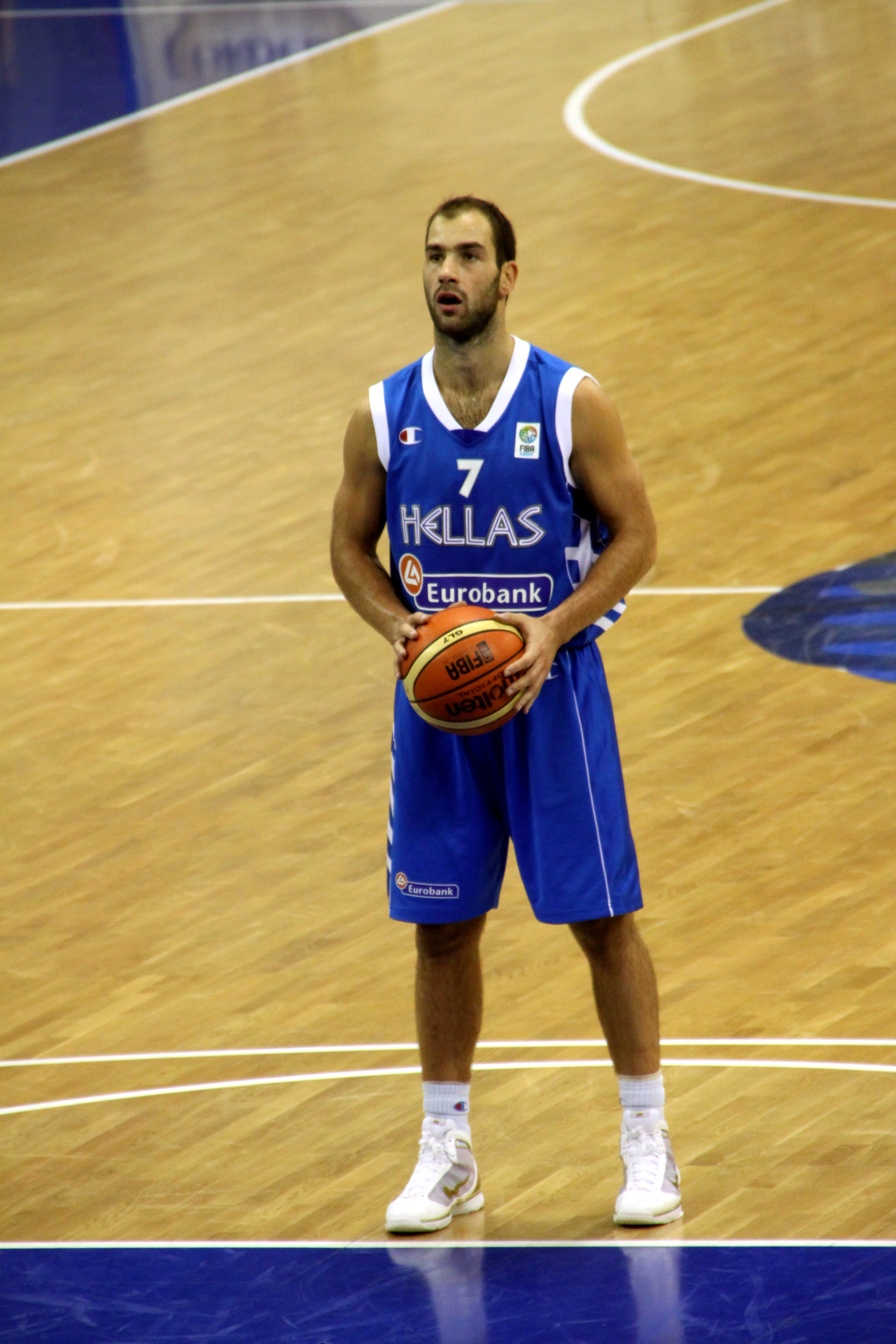
Vassilis Spanoulis was the Greek Basketball League Finals MVP , three times (2006, 2015, 2016).

Sasha Vezenkov was the Greek Basketball League Finals MVP two times (2022 and 2025).

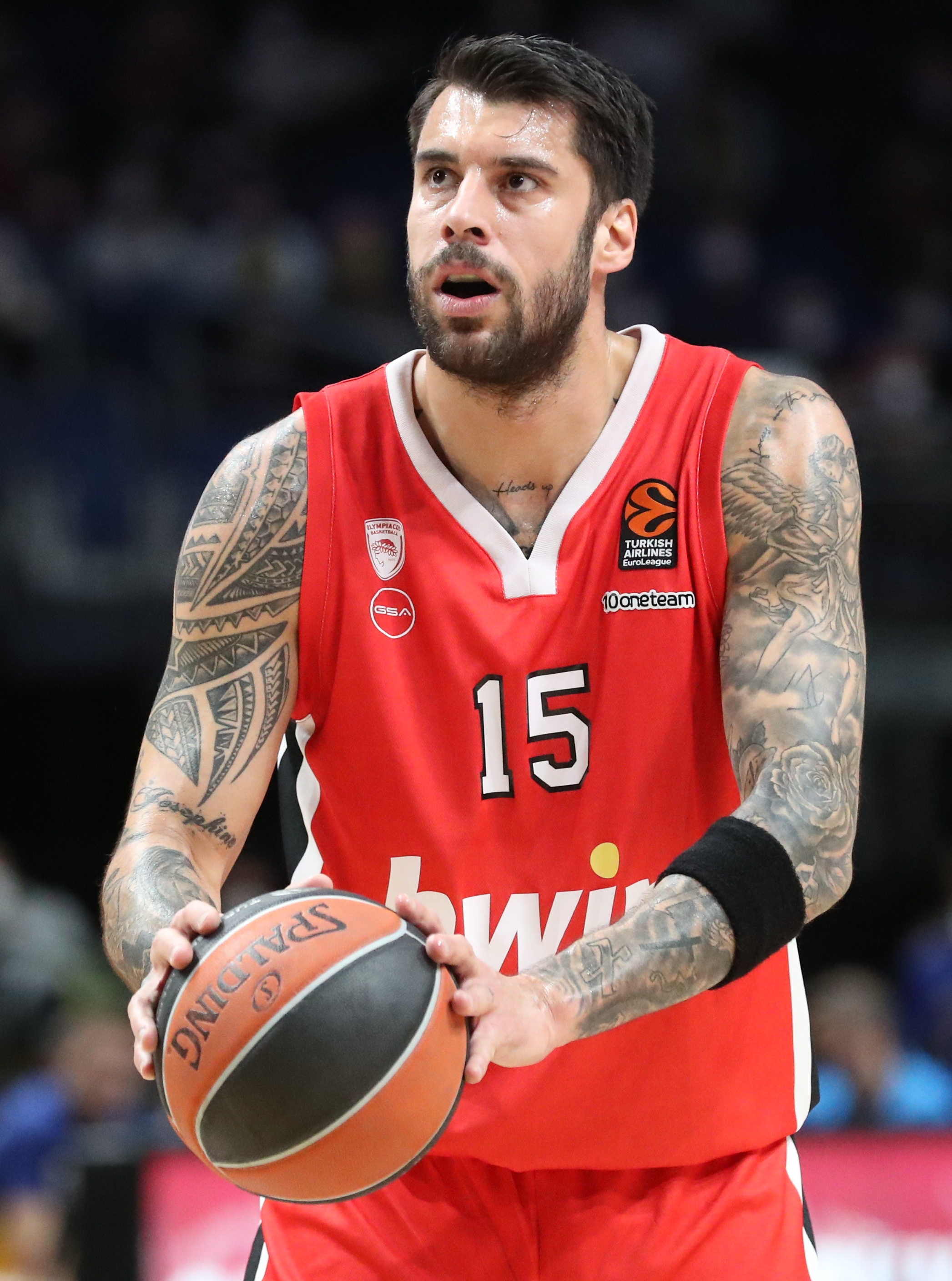
Giorgos Printezis was the Greek Basketball League Finals MVP two times (2012 and 2015).

*	Member of the Naismith Memorial Basketball Hall of Fame
**	Member of the FIBA Hall of Fame
***	Member of both the Naismith and FIBA Halls of Fame

Season	Finals MVP	Club	Ref.
1987–88	(Greece) / (United States) Nikos Galis**	Aris	
1988–89	(Greece) / (United States) Nikos Galis** (2×)	Aris	
1989–90	(Greece) / (United States) Nikos Galis** (3×)	Aris	
1990–91	(Greece) / (United States) Nikos Galis** (4×)	Aris	
1991–92	(Greece) Panagiotis Fasoulas**	PAOK	
1992–93	(Greece) Georgios Sigalas	Olympiacos	
1993–94	(Greece) Georgios Sigalas (2×)	Olympiacos	
1994–95	(United States) Eddie Johnson	Olympiacos	
1995–96	(Greece) Georgios Sigalas (3×)	Olympiacos	
1996–97	(Greece) Georgios Sigalas (4×)	Olympiacos	
1997–98	(Croatia) Dino Rađja*	Panathinaikos	
1998–99	(Federal Republic of Yugoslavia) Dejan Bodiroga	Panathinaikos	
1999–00	(Federal Republic of Yugoslavia) Dejan Bodiroga (2×)	Panathinaikos	
2000–01	(Federal Republic of Yugoslavia) Željko Rebrača	Panathinaikos	
2001–02	(Greece) Dimos Dikoudis	AEK	
2002–03	(Slovenia) Jaka Lakovič	Panathinaikos	
2003–04	(Greece) Nikos Chatzivrettas	Panathinaikos	
2004–05	(Slovenia) Jaka Lakovič (2×)	Panathinaikos	
2005–06	(Greece) Dimitris Diamantidis	Panathinaikos	
2005–06	(Greece) Vassilis Spanoulis	Panathinaikos	
2006–07	(Greece) Dimitris Diamantidis (2×)	Panathinaikos	
2007–08	(Greece) Vassilis Spanoulis (2×)	Panathinaikos	
2008–09	(United States) Drew Nicholas	Panathinaikos	
2009–10	(United States) Mike Batiste	Panathinaikos	
2010–11	(Greece) Dimitris Diamantidis (3×)	Panathinaikos	
2010–11	(United States) Mike Batiste (2×)	Panathinaikos	
2011–12	(Greece) Giorgos Printezis	Olympiacos	
2012–13	(Croatia) Roko Ukić	Panathinaikos	
2013–14	(Greece) Dimitris Diamantidis (4×)	Panathinaikos	
2014–15	(Greece) Giorgos Printezis (2×)	Olympiacos	
2015–16	(Greece) Vassilis Spanoulis (3×)	Olympiacos	
2016–17	(United States) Mike James	Panathinaikos	
2017–18	(United States) Mike James (2×)	Panathinaikos	
2018–19	(United States) Deshaun Thomas	Panathinaikos	
2019–20	Not awarded due to the COVID-19 Pandemic.		
2020–21	(Greece) Ioannis Papapetrou	Panathinaikos	
2021–22	(Bulgaria) / (Greece) Sasha Vezenkov	Olympiacos	
2022–23	(Greece) / (United States) Thomas Walkup	Olympiacos	
2023–24	(United States) Kendrick Nunn	Panathinaikos	
2024–25	(Bulgaria) / (Greece) Sasha Vezenkov (2×)	Olympiacos	
2025–26	(France) Evan Fournier	Olympiacos	

== Multiple Greek Basketball League Finals MVP award winners ==
*	Member of the Naismith Memorial Basketball Hall of Fame
**	Member of the FIBA Hall of Fame
***	Member of both the Naismith and FIBA Halls of Fame

Greek Basketball League Finals MVP	Number Of Greek Basketball League Finals MVPs Won	Years won
(Greece) Dimitris Diamantidis	(4×)	(2006, 2007, 2011, 2014)
(Greece) Georgios Sigalas	(4×)	(1993, 1994, 1996, 1999)
(United States) / (Greece) Nikos Galis**	(4×)	(1988, 1989, 1990, 1991)
(Greece) Vassilis Spanoulis	(3×)	(2006, 2008, 2016)
(Bulgaria) / (Greece) Sasha Vezenkov	(2×)	(2022, 2025)
(United States) Mike James	(2×)	(2017, 2018)
(Greece) Giorgos Printezis	(2×)	(2012, 2015)
(United States) Mike Batiste	(2×)	(2010, 2011)
(Slovenia) Jaka Lakovič	(2×)	(2003, 2005)
(Federal Republic of Yugoslavia) Dejan Bodiroga	(2×)	(1999, 2000)

== See also ==
- Greek Basketball League awards
- Greek Basketball League MVP
