= Giorgos Sigalas =

Greek coach and retired basketball player (born 1971)

Personal information
- Born: 31 July 1971 (age 55) Peristeri, Greece
- Listed height: 6 ft 7 in (2.01 m)
- Listed weight: 235 lb (107 kg)

Career information
- Playing career: 1988–2007
- Position: Shooting guard / small forward
- Number: 5, 8, 9, 6
- Coaching career: 2008–present

Career history

Playing
- 1988–1989: Olympiacos Piraeus
- 1989–1990: Papagos
- 1990–1997: Olympiacos Piraeus
- 1997–1998: Olimpia Milano
- 1998–2000: Aris Thessaloniki
- 2000–2002: P.A.O.K.
- 2002–2003: Granada
- 2003: Viola Reggio Calabria
- 2003–2004: Makedonikos Neapoli
- 2004–2005: Panionios
- 2005–2007: Aris Thessaloniki

Coaching
- 2008: Greece U20
- 2008–2009: Ermis Lagkada
- 2014: Aigaleo
- 2020: Iraklis Thessaloniki (assistant)
- 2020–2022: Kolossos Rhodes (assistant)
- 2022–2024: Aris Thessaloniki (assistant)
- 2024: Kolossos Rhodes
- 2025: Iraklis Thessaloniki

Career highlights
- As player: EuroLeague champion (1997); FIBA European Selection (1995); FIBA EuroStars (1996); 5× Greek League champion (1993–1997); 2× Greek Cup winner (1994, 1997); Greek League MVP (1996); 4× Greek League Finals MVP (1993, 1994, 1996, 1997); 7× Greek All-Star (1994 (I), 1994 (II), 1996 I, 1996 II, 1998, 2001, 2002); Acropolis Tournament MVP (1999)

Giorgos Sigalas (alternate spelling: Georgios) (Greek: Γιώργος Σιγάλας; born 31 July 1971 in Peristeri, Greece) is a Greek retired professional basketball player and is the current head coach for Iraklis of the Greek Basketball League.

During the decade of the 1990s, the 2.01 m (6 ft 7 in) tall swingman was the regular team captain of the pro club Olympiacos Piraeus, of the Greek League and the EuroLeague, and also of the Greece men's national basketball team. Nicknamed Rambo, during his playing career, Sigalas was one of the best European defensive players of his generation.

Sigalas helped Olympiacos Piraeus to win a EuroLeague title in 1997, as well as to make two more EuroLeague Finals appearances, in 1994 and 1995. With the Greece men's national team, he competed in six consecutive EuroBasket tournaments, (1993, 1995, 1997, 1999, 2001, and 2003), and he made it to the semifinals on the first three occasions. Sigalas was also instrumental on the Greek teams that made the semifinals of both the 1994 FIBA World Championship and the 1998 FIBA World Championship, as well as on Greece's team that finished in fifth place at the 1996 Summer Olympic Games.

== Professional career ==
=== Greece ===
Sigalas won five consecutive Greek League championships, while playing with Olympiacos Piraeus, from 1993 to 1997. He also won two Greek Cup titles with Olympiacos, in 1994 and 1997. He also served as the team's captain.

In 1997, while playing with Olympiacos, Sigalas won the European basketball Triple Crown, meaning his team won the Greek League championship, the Greek Cup title, and also the European-wide top-tier level EuroLeague championship, all in the same season. As of 2020, it is still the only time it has happened in the club's history.

=== Italy ===
Sigalas left Olympiacos Piraeus in 1997, after winning the EuroLeague championship with them, and he then joined the Italian League team Olimpia Milano. He played there during the 1997–98 season.

=== Return to Greece ===
Sigalas then returned to the Greek League the following year, to play with Aris Thessaloniki. He stayed with Aris until 2000, when he transferred to Aris' arch-rival PAOK Thessaloniki, with whom he played from 2000 to 2002.

=== Spain ===
Sigalas next played in the Spanish League with Granada, at the beginning of the 2002–03 season.

=== Back to Italy ===
Sigalas returned to the Italian League, to play with Viola Reggio Calabria, at the end of the 2002–03 season.

=== End of career in Greece ===
In the last years of his pro playing career, Sigalas returned home to once again play in the Greek League, to finish his club career. He played with Makedonikos in the 2003–04 season, with Panionios in the 2004–05 season, and finally, Sigalas ended his career back with Aris, where he played from 2005, until he retired in the year 2007.

== National team career ==
=== Greece under-18, under-20 national teams ===
Sigalas made his U18 international debut with the Greece men's national under-18 basketball team at the 1990 FIBA Europe Under-18 Championship, and the Greece men's national under-20 basketball team won a silver medal at the 1992 FIBA Europe Under-20 Championship.

=== Greece men's national team ===
Sigalas was the long-time captain of the Greece men's national basketball team. He played with the Greece men's national team in 185 games. With Greece's senior team, he competed in six consecutive EuroBaskets (1993, 1995, 1997, 1999, 2001, and 2003).

Sigalas competed with the Greece men's national team at the 1994 FIBA World Championship, and the 1998 FIBA World Championship, as well as at the 1996 Atlanta Summer Olympic Games.

== Post-playing career ==
After retiring from playing professional club basketball, Sigalas worked as a TV basketball commentator in Greece, for EuroLeague games. He also worked as a basketball coach for the Greece men's national under-20 basketball team. He would coach Ermis Lagkada, during the 2009–10 season.

Later, he coached the Cypriot League team Keravnos, and the Greek team Aigaleo.

In January 2020, Sigalas was hired as the assistant coach of Ilias Kantzouris, for Greek Basket League club Iraklis Thessaloniki. He then spent two seasons as an assistant coach with Kolossos Rodou, before returning to Aris in 2022, under coach Kastritis.

== Awards and accomplishments ==
=== Pro club career ===
- 5× consecutive Greek League Champion: (1993–1997)
- 4× Greek League Finals MVP: (1993, 1994, 1996, 1997)
- 2× Greek Cup Winner: (1994, 1997)
- 7× Greek League All-Star: (1994 I, 1994 II, 1996 I, 1996 II, 1998, 2001, 2002)
- EuroLeague All-Final Four Team: (1994)
- FIBA European Selection: (1995)
- FIBA EuroStar: (1996)
- Greek League MVP: (1996)
- EuroLeague Champion: (1997)
- Triple Crown Winner: (1997)
- Acropolis Tournament MVP: (1999)
