= Savvas Iliadis =

Greek basketball player (born 1979)

Savvas Iliadis Σάββας Ηλιάδης
Personal information
- Born: November 6, 1979 (age 47) Thessaloniki, Greece
- Listed height: 6 ft 3.75 in (1.92 m)
- Listed weight: 200 lb (91 kg)

Career information
- Playing career: 2000–2014
- Position: Point guard / shooting guard
- Number: 10

Career history
- 2000–2002: Aias Evosmou
- 2002–2005: Iraklis Thessaloniki
- 2005–2006: Panionios
- 2006: Panellinios
- 2006–2009: Aris Thessaloniki
- 2009–2010: Kavala
- 2011: Iraklis Thessaloniki
- 2011–2012: Ermis Lagkada
- 2012–2014: Aias Evosmou

Career highlights
- All-Greek League Second Team (2004); Greek League All-Star (2007)
Medals
Men's basketball
Representing Greece
Mediterranean Games
Silver medal – second place	2005 Almería

Savvas Iliadis (alternate spelling: Savas) (Greek: Σάββας Ηλιάδης; born November 6, 1979) is a former Greek professional basketball player.

== Professional career ==
Iliadis began playing basketball with the junior youth teams of Aias Evosmou. He began his professional career with Aias Evosmou in the Greek 2nd Division during the 2000–01 season. In 2002, he moved to Iraklis.

In 2005, he moved to Panionios. In 2006, he joined Aris, and in 2009, he moved to Kavala. In January 2011, he returned to Iraklis.

== National team career ==
With the Greek national team, Iliadis won the silver medal at the 2005 Mediterranean Games.

== Personal life ==
Iliadis is an Aris fan. His brother is the Greek football player Stelios Iliadis.
