= Greek Basketball League MVP =

Annual award for top-tier league

The Greek Basketball League Season MVP or Greek League MVP is the yearly MVP award that is awarded by the 1st-tier professional basketball league in Greece, the Greek Basketball League (GBL).

Since the 2014–15 season, the Greek Basketball League MVP award is voted on by the fans online, whereas previously it was not. The voting is currently decided by a ratio of 40% by the fans and the media, and 60% by the head coaches and the captains of each of the 14 teams of the Greek Basketball League.

== Greek Basketball League MVP award winners ==
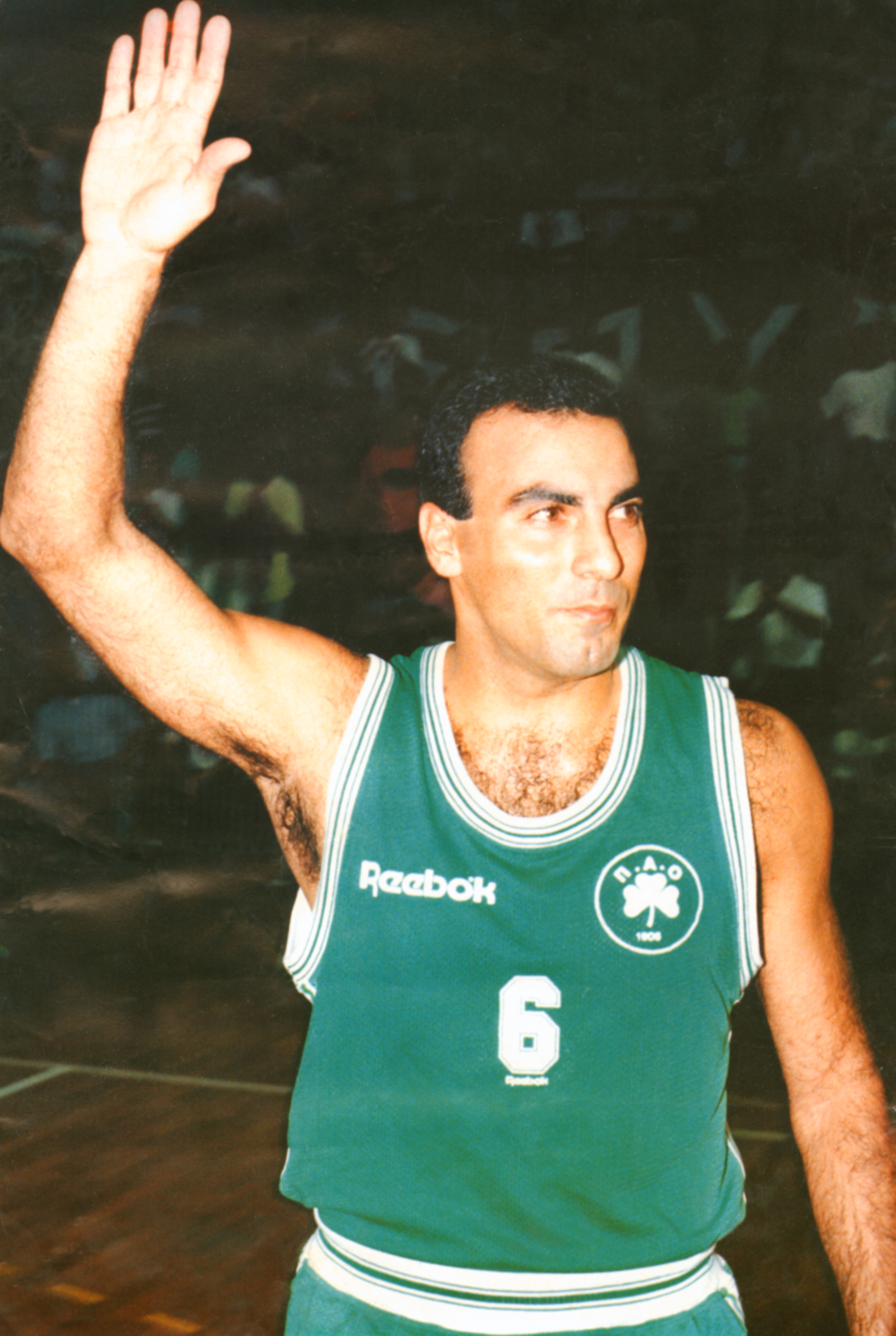
Nikos Galis was the Greek Basketball League MVP five times (1988–1992).

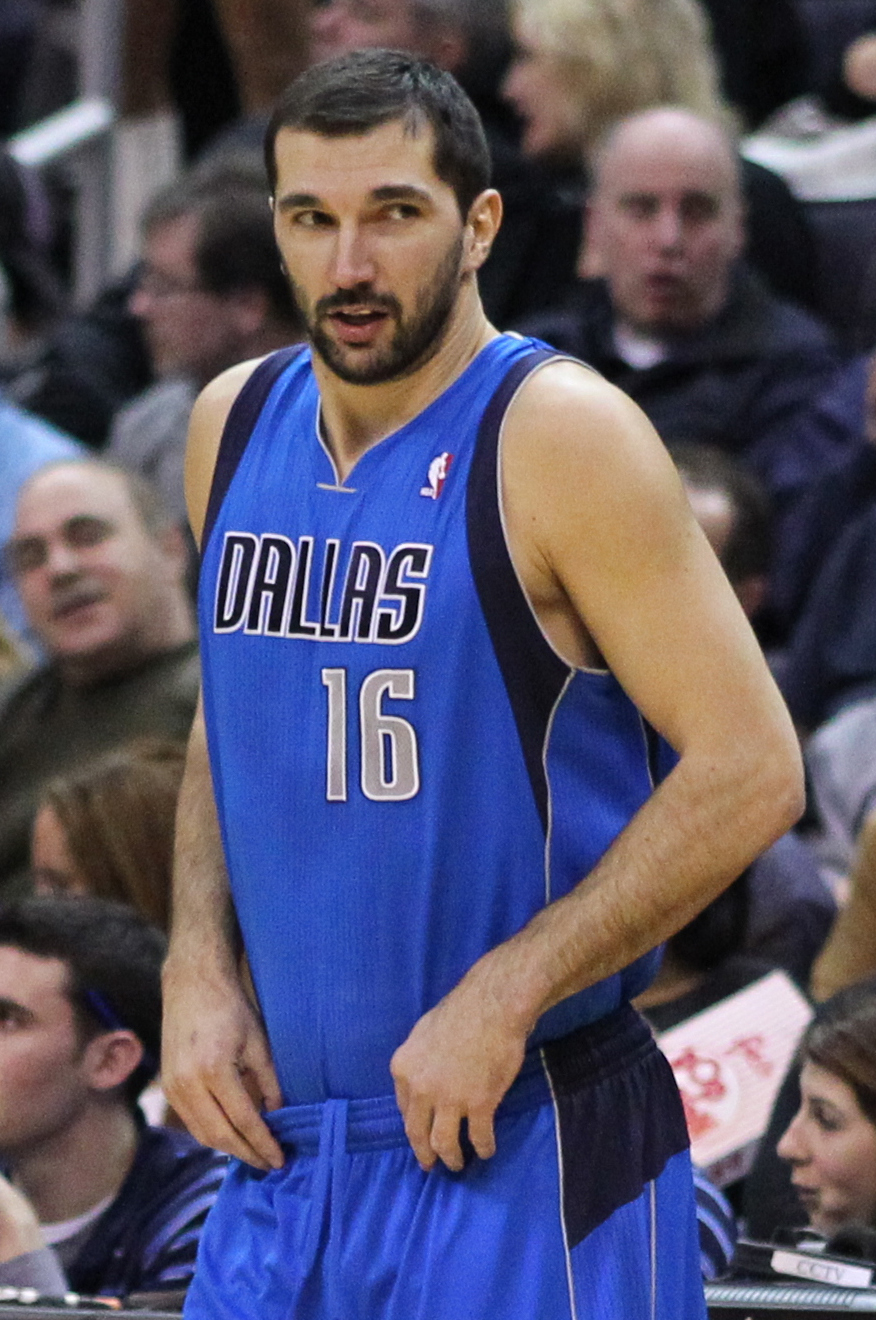
Peja Stojaković was the Greek Basketball League MVP in 1998.

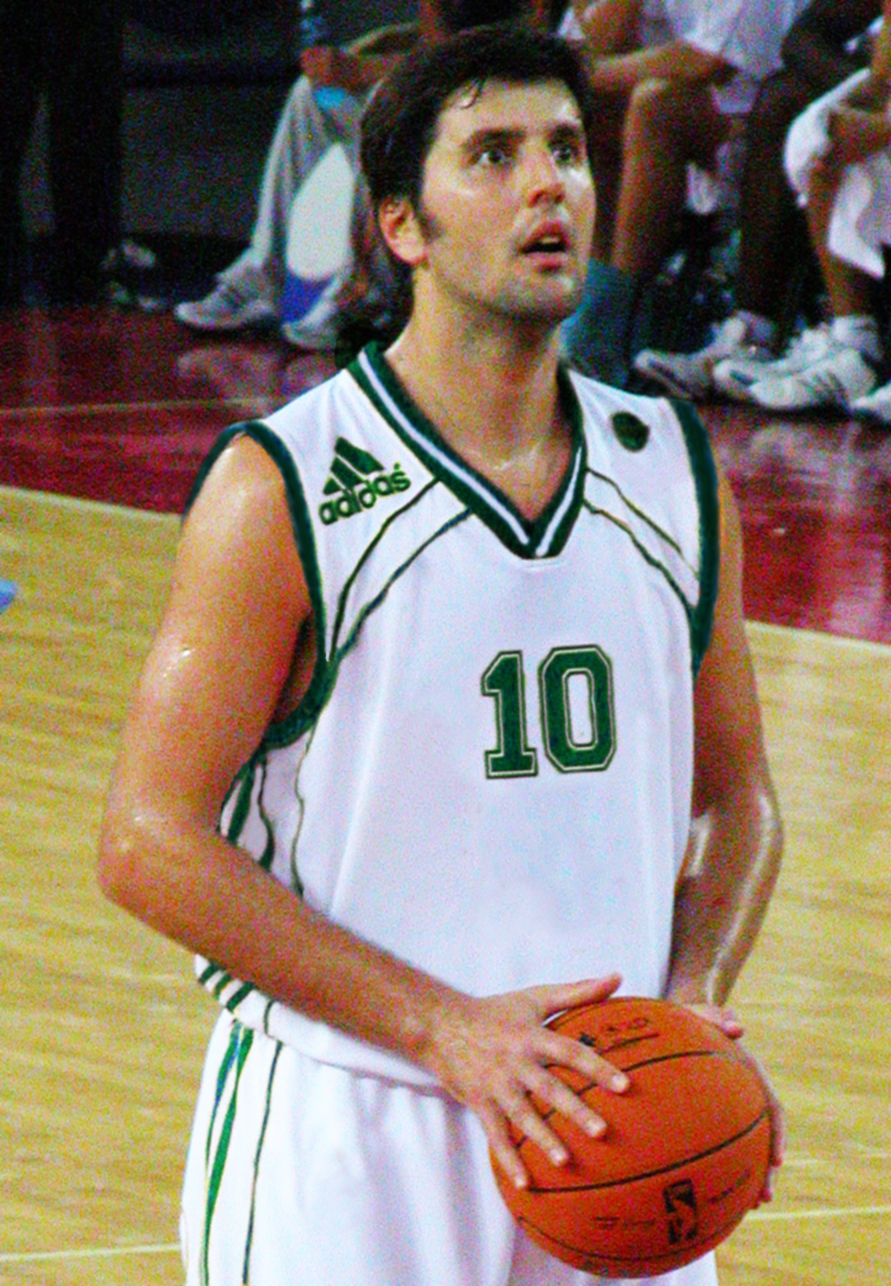
Dejan Bodiroga was the Greek Basket League MVP in 1999.

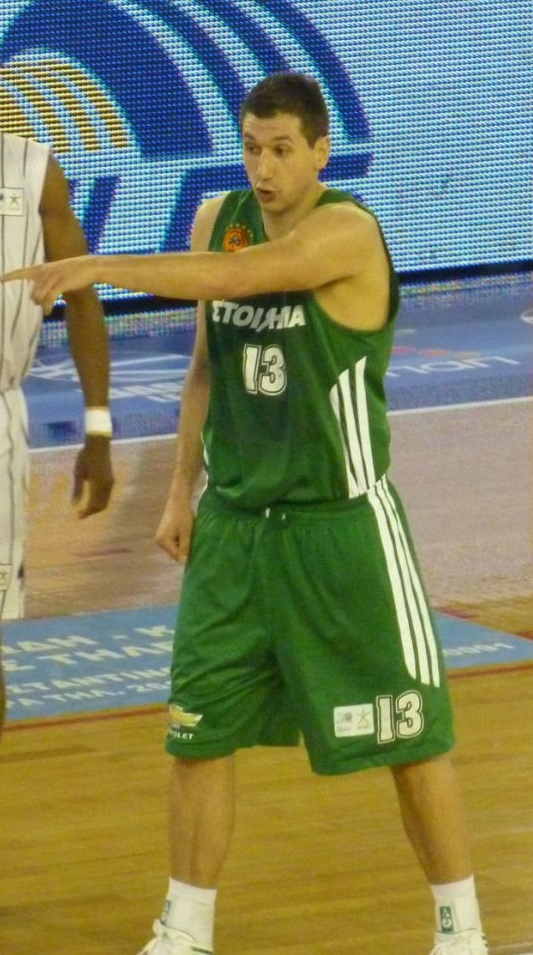
Dimitris Diamantidis won the most Greek Basketball League MVP awards, with six (2004, 2006, 2007, 2008, 2011, 2014).

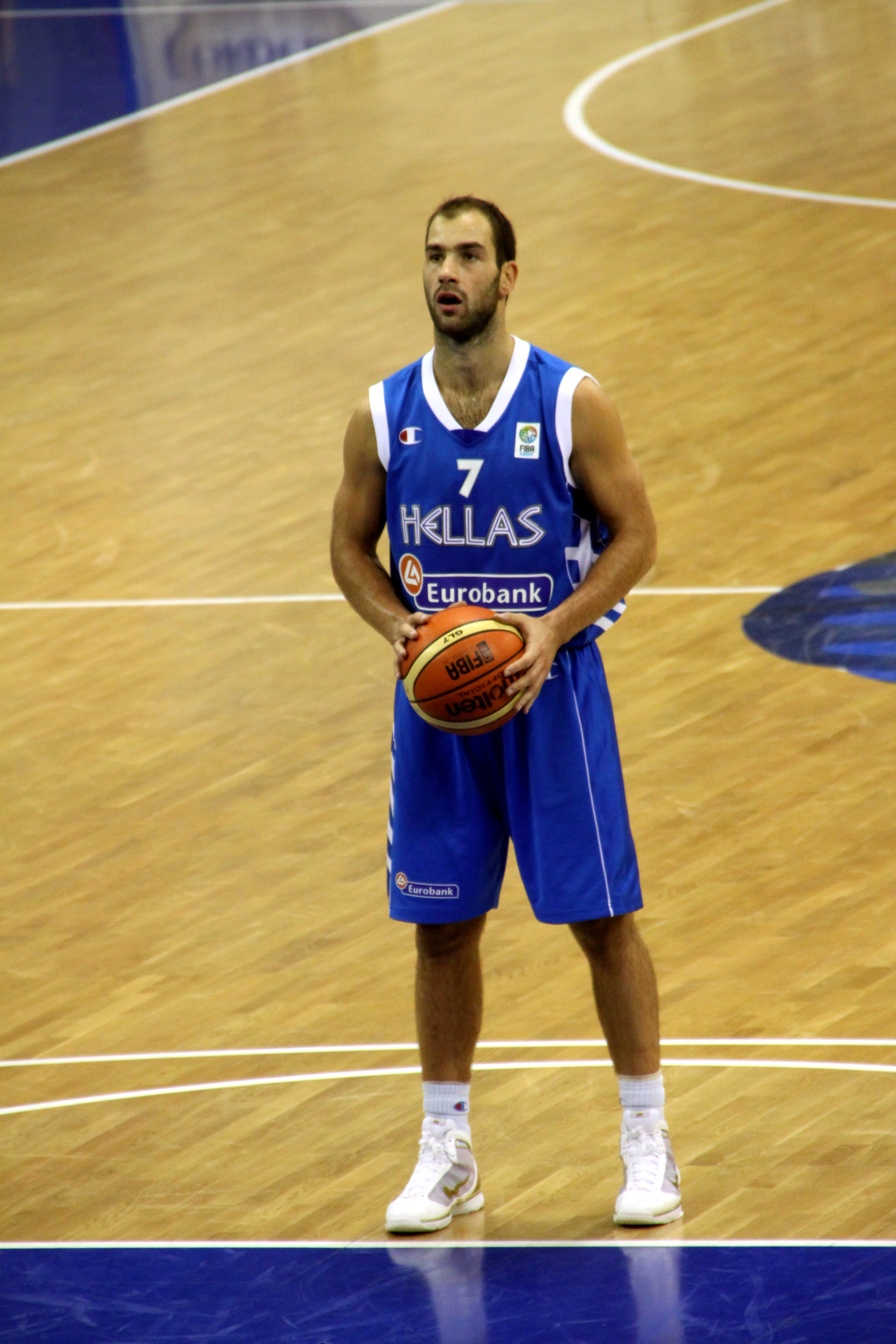
Vassilis Spanoulis was the Greek Basketball League MVP four times (2005, 2009, 2012, 2016).

Sasha Vezenkov was the Greek Basketball League MVP four times (2015, 2022, 2023, 2025).

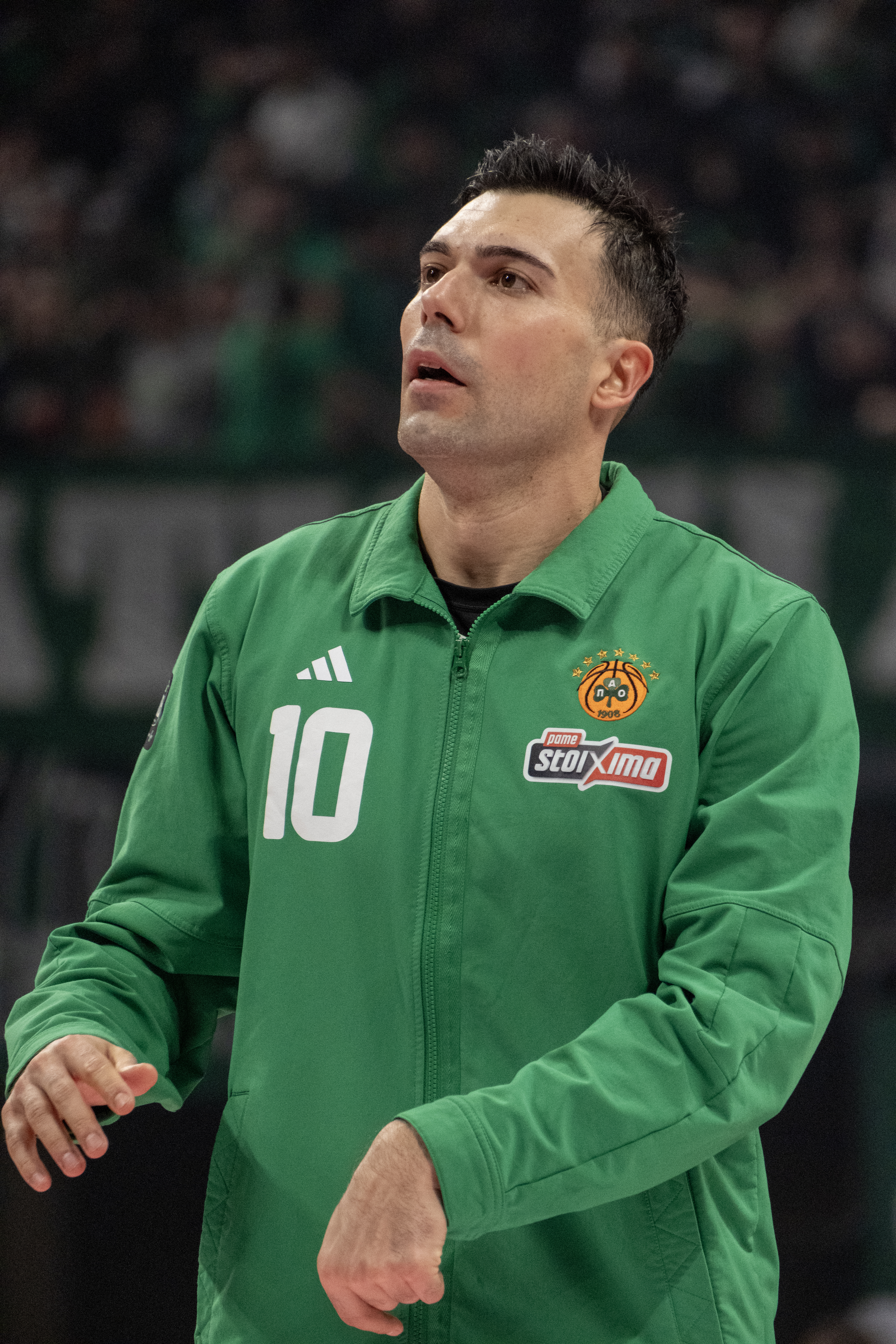
Kostas Sloukas was the Greek Basketball League MVP in 2024.

*	Member of the Naismith Memorial Basketball Hall of Fame
**	Member of the FIBA Hall of Fame
***	Member of both the Naismith and FIBA Halls of Fame

Season	Player	Position	Nationality	Team
1987–88	Nikos Galis**	Guard	Greece	Aris
1988–89	Nikos Galis*** (2)	Guard	Greece	Aris
1989–90	Nikos Galis*** (3)	Guard	Greece	Aris
1990–91	Nikos Galis*** (4)	Guard	Greece	Aris
1991–92	Nikos Galis*** (5)	Guard	Greece	Aris
1992–93	Fanis Christodoulou	Forward	Greece	Panionios
1993–94	Panagiotis Fasoulas**	Center	Greece	Olympiacos
1994–95	Panagiotis Fasoulas** (2)	Center	Greece	Olympiacos
1995–96	Giorgos Sigalas	Forward	Greece	Olympiacos
1996–97	David Rivers	Guard	United States	Olympiacos
1997–98	Peja Stojaković	Forward	FR Yugoslavia	PAOK
1998–99	Dejan Bodiroga	Forward	FR Yugoslavia	Panathinaikos
1999–2000	Željko Rebrača	Center	FR Yugoslavia	Panathinaikos
2000–01	Alphonso Ford	Guard	United States	Peristeri
2001–02	Dimos Dikoudis	Forward	Greece	AEK
2002–03	Fragiskos Alvertis	Forward	Greece	Panathinaikos
2003–04	Dimitris Diamantidis	Guard	Greece	Iraklis
2004–05	Vassilis Spanoulis	Guard	Greece	Maroussi
2005–06	Dimitris Diamantidis (2)	Guard	Greece	Panathinaikos
2006–07	Dimitris Diamantidis (3)	Guard	Greece	Panathinaikos
2007–08	Dimitris Diamantidis (4)	Guard	Greece	Panathinaikos
2008–09	Vassilis Spanoulis (2)	Guard	Greece	Panathinaikos
2009–10	Mike Batiste	Center	United States	Panathinaikos
2010–11	Dimitris Diamantidis (5)	Guard	Greece	Panathinaikos
2011–12	Vassilis Spanoulis (3)	Guard	Greece	Olympiacos
2012–13	Stéphane Lasme	Center	Gabon	Panathinaikos
2013–14	Dimitris Diamantidis (6)	Guard	Greece	Panathinaikos
2014–15	Sasha Vezenkov	Forward	Bulgaria	Aris
2015–16	Vassilis Spanoulis (4)	Guard	Greece	Olympiacos
2016–17	Nick Calathes	Guard	Greece	Panathinaikos
2017–18	Nick Calathes (2)	Guard	Greece	Panathinaikos
2018–19	Nick Calathes (3)	Guard	Greece	Panathinaikos
2019–20	Canceled due to the COVID-19 pandemic			
2020–21	Ioannis Papapetrou	Forward	Greece	Panathinaikos
2021–22	Sasha Vezenkov (2)	Forward	Bulgaria	Olympiacos
2022–23	Sasha Vezenkov (3)	Forward	Bulgaria	Olympiacos
2023–24	Kostas Sloukas	Guard	Greece	Panathinaikos
2024–25	Sasha Vezenkov (4)	Forward	Bulgaria	Olympiacos
2025–26	Evan Fournier	Guard	France	Olympiacos

== Multiple Greek Basketball League MVP award winners ==
*	Member of the Naismith Memorial Basketball Hall of Fame
**	Member of the FIBA Hall of Fame
***	Member of both the Naismith and FIBA Halls of Fame

MVP	Number of awards	Years
(Greece) Dimitris Diamantidis	6	2004, 2006-2008, 2011, 2014
(Greece) / (United States) Nikos Galis**	5	1988-1992
(Greece) Vassilis Spanoulis	4	2005, 2009, 2012, 2016
(Bulgaria) / (Greece) Sasha Vezenkov	4	2015, 2022, 2023, 2025
(Greece) / (United States) Nick Calathes	3	2017, 2018, 2019
(Greece) Panagiotis Fasoulas**	2	1994, 1995

== MVP winners by nationality ==
- Listed by which country each player was registered to for senior level national team competitions.

Nationality	Number of MVPs
Greece	27
Bulgaria	4
United States	3
(Federal Republic of Yugoslavia) FR Yugoslavia	3
Gabon	1
France	1

== MVP winners by team ==
Club	Number of MVPs	Seasons
Panathinaikos	16	1998–99, 1999–00, 2002–03, 2005–06, 2006-07, 2007–08, 2008–09, 2009–10, 2010–11, 2012–13, 2013–14, 2016–17, 2017–18, 2018–19, 2020–21, 2023–24
Olympiacos	10	1993–94, 1994–95, 1995–96, 1996–97, 2011–12, 2015–16, 2021–22, 2022–23, 2024–25, 2025–26
Aris	6	1987–88, 1988–89, 1989–90, 1990–91, 1991–92, 2014–15
Panionios	1	1992–93
PAOK	1	1997–98
Peristeri	1	2000–01
AEK	1	2001–02
Iraklis	1	2003–04
Maroussi	1	2004–05

== See also ==
- Greek Basketball League awards
- Greek Basketball League Finals MVP
