= 1999–2000 Greek Basket League =

1999–2000 Greek Basket League season
- League: Greek Basket League
- Sport: Basketball
- Teams: 14

Regular Season
- Season champions: Olympiacos
- Season MVP: (Federal Republic of Yugoslavia) Željko Rebrača
- Top scorer: (United States) Alphonso Ford 586 Points (22.5 PPG)

Playoffs

Finals
- Champions: Panathinaikos
- Runners-up: PAOK
- Finals MVP: (Federal Republic of Yugoslavia) Dejan Bodiroga

Greek Basket League seasons
- ← 1998–99 2000–01 →

The 1999–2000 Greek Basket League season was the 60th season of the Greek Basket League, the highest tier professional basketball league in Greece. It was also the 8th season of Greek Basket League championship that was regulated by HEBA (ESAKE). The winner of the league was Panathinaikos, which beat PAOK in the league's playoff's finals, although the regular season winner was Olympiacos. The clubs Sporting and Esperos were relegated to the Greek A2 League. The top scorer of the league was Alphonso Ford, a player of Peristeri. Željko Rebrača was voted the MVP of the league.

== Teams ==
Location of teams in Greek Basket League 1999–2000

Club	Home city
AEK Athens	Athens
Aris	Thessaloniki
Dafni	Dafni, Athens
Esperos	Kallithea, Athens
Irakleio	Irakleio
Iraklis	Thessaloniki
Maroussi	Maroussi, Athens
Near East	Kaisariani, Athens
Olympiacos	Piraeus
Panathinaikos	Athens
Panionios	Nea Smyrni, Athens
PAOK	Thessaloniki
Peristeri	Peristeri, Athens
Sporting	Athens

== Regular season ==
Pos	Team	Total							Home		Away	
		Pts	Pld	W	L	F	A	GD	W	L	W	L
1.	Olympiacos	47	26	21	5	1.869	1.642	+227	12	1	9	4
2.	Panathinaikos	47	26	21	5	1.990	1.681	+309	11	2	10	3
3.	AEK Athens	45	26	19	7	1.938	1.740	+198	11	2	8	5
4.	PAOK	42	26	16	10	1.916	1.813	+103	11	2	5	8
5.	Peristeri	41	26	15	11	1.935	1.880	+55	9	4	6	7
6.	Panionios	40	26	14	12	1.920	1.891	+29	10	3	4	9
7.	Iraklis	40	26	14	12	1.882	1.789	+93	10	3	4	9
8.	Aris	40	26	14	12	1.847	1.850	-3	9	4	4	9
9.	Near East	37	26	11	15	1.992	2.009	-107	10	3	1	12
10.	Maroussi	37	26	11	15	1.823	1.873	-50	5	8	6	7
11.	Irakleio	37	26	11	15	2.008	1.985	+22	7	6	4	9
12.	Dafni	34	26	8	18	1.829	2.014	-185	5	8	3	10
13.	Esperos	31	26	5	21	1.783	2.110	-327	5	8	0	13
14.	Sporting	29	26	3	23	1.719	2.083	-364	2	11	1	12

Source: esake.gr, galanissportsdata.com

== Playoffs ==
Play-off
Aris	2
Near East	0
Peristeri	2
Dafni	1
Iraklis	2
Maroussi	0
Panionios	2
Irakleio	2

Quarterfinals
Olympiacos	2
Aris	0
PAOK	2
Peristeri	1
Panathinaikos	2
Iraklis	0
AEK Athens	2
Panionios	1

Semifinals
Olympiacos	0
PAOK	2
Panathinaikos	2
AEK Athens	1

Final
Panathinaikos	3
PAOK	0
Third place
Olympiacos	3
AEK Athens	1

=== The finals ===
Panathinaikos	85–58	PAOK

PAOK	62–69	Panathinaikos

Panathinaikos	76–63	PAOK

== Final standings ==
Pos	Team
1.	Panathinaikos
2.	PAOK
3.	Olympiacos
4.	AEK Athens
5.	Peristeri
6.	Panionios
7.	Iraklis
8.	Aris
9.	Near East
10.	Maroussi
11.	Irakleio
12.	Dafni
13.	Esperos
14.	Sporting

== Top Players ==
Category	Player	Team	Average
Points	Alphonso Ford	Peristeri	22,7
Rebounds	James Forrest	Irakleio	11,3
Assists	Byron Dinkins	Iraklis	4,5
Steals	Vassil Evtimov	Dafni	1,9
Blocks	Željko Rebrača	Panathinaikos	1,7

== Clubs in international competitions ==
Team	Competition	Result
Panathinaikos	FIBA EuroLeague	Final 4, 1st place
Olympiacos	FIBA EuroLeague	Playoffs, Top 16
PAOK	FIBA EuroLeague	Playoffs, Top 16
AEK	FIBA Saporta Cup	Final, 1st place
Iraklis	FIBA Saporta Cup	Quarterfinals, Home and away format
Maroussi	FIBA Korać Cup	Playoffs, Quarterfinals, Home and away format
Aris	FIBA Korać Cup	Playoffs, Top 16, Home and away format
Peristeri	FIBA Korać Cup	Playoffs, Top 16, Home and away format
Near East	FIBA Korać Cup	Playoffs, Third round, Home and away format
