= 2003–04 Greek Basket League =

2003–04 Greek Basket League season
- League: Greek Basket League
- Sport: Basketball
- Teams: 14

Regular Season
- Season champions: Panathinaikos
- Season MVP: (Greece) Dimitris Diamantidis
- Top scorer: (Greece) Nestoras Kommatos 477 Points (20.8 PPG)

Playoffs

Finals
- Champions: Panathinaikos
- Runners-up: Maroussi
- Finals MVP: (Greece) Nikos Chatzivrettas

Greek Basket League seasons
- ← 2002–03 2004–05 →

The 2003–04 Greek Basket League season was the 64th season of the Greek Basket League, the highest tier professional basketball league in Greece. It was also the 12th season of Greek Basket League championship that was regulated by HEBA (ESAKE). The winner of the league was Panathinaikos, which beat Maroussi in the league's playoff's finals series. The clubs Irakleio and Ilysiakos were relegated to the Greek A2 League, along with Peristeri, which was relegated because it faced financial problems. The top scorer of the league was Nestoras Kommatos.

== Teams ==
Location of teams in Greek Basket League 2003–04

Club	Home city
AEK Athens	Athens
Apollon Patras	Patras
Aris	Thessaloniki
Ilysiakos	Athens
Ionikos Nea Filadelfeia	Nea Filadelfeia, Athens
Irakleio	Irakleio
Iraklis	Thessaloniki
Makedonikos	Thessaloniki
Maroussi	Maroussi, Athens
Olympiacos	Piraeus
Panathinaikos	Athens
Panionios	Nea Smyrni, Athens
PAOK	Thessaloniki
Peristeri	Peristeri, Athens

== Regular season ==
Pos	Team	Total							Home		Away	
		Pts	Pld	W	L	F	A	GD	W	L	W	L
1.	Panathinaikos	48	26	22	4	2069	1795	+274	13	0	9	4
2.	Maroussi	47	26	21	5	2146	2027	+119	13	0	8	5
3.	Aris	43	26	17	9	2201	2064	+137	11	2	6	7
4.	Iraklis	42	26	16	10	2005	1893	+112	11	2	5	8
5.	PAOK	41	26	15	11	2212	2076	+136	11	2	4	9
6.	AEK Athens	40	26	14	12	2045	2010	+35	10	3	4	9
7.	Peristeri	39	26	13	13	1971	1958	+13	8	5	5	8
8.	Olympiacos	39	26	13	13	1872	1873	−1	9	4	4	9
9.	Makedonikos	37	26	11	15	1856	1924	−68	8	5	3	10
10.	Panionios	37	26	11	15	2100	2112	−12	7	6	4	9
11.	Apollon Patras	35	26	9	17	2064	2183	−119	9	4	0	13
12.	Ionikos N.F.	33	26	7	19	1982	2124	−142	6	7	1	12
13.	Irakleio	33	26	7	19	1985	2217	−232	6	7	1	12
14.	Ilysiakos	32	26	6	20	1906	2158	−252	5	8	1	12

Source: esake.gr, galanissportsdata.com

== Playoffs ==
Quarterfinals
1	Panathinaikos	2
8	Olympiacos	0
4	Iraklis	2
5	PAOK	1
2	Maroussi	2
7	Peristeri	1
3	Aris	0
6	AEK Athens	2

Semifinals
1	Panathinaikos	2
4	Iraklis	1
2	Maroussi	2
2	AEK Athens	0

Finals
1	Panathinaikos	3
2	Maroussi	0
Third place
3	Iraklis	3
4	AEK Athens	2

=== Finals ===
Panathinaikos	101–71	Maroussi

Maroussi	75–84	Panathinaikos

Panathinaikos	77–66	Maroussi

== Final standings ==
Pos	Team	Overall record		
		Pld	W	L
1.	Panathinaikos	34	29	5
2.	Maroussi	33	25	8
3.	Iraklis	37	22	15
4.	AEK Athens	35	18	17
5.	Aris	28	17	11
6.	PAOK	29	16	13
7.	Peristeri ^{a}	28	13	15
8.	Olympiacos	28	13	15
9.	Makedonikos	26	11	15
10.	Panionios	26	11	15
11.	Apollon Patras	26	9	17
12.	Ionikos N.F.	26	7	19
13.	Irakleio	26	7	19
14.	Ilysiakos	26	6	20

- ^aPeristeri was relegated because of financial problems

== Awards ==
=== Greek League MVP ===
- (Greece) Dimitris Diamantidis – Iraklis

=== Greek League Finals MVP ===
- (Greece) Nikos Chatzivrettas – Panathinaikos

=== All-Greek League Team ===
- (United States) Roderick Blakney – Maroussi
- (Greece) Nikos Chatzis – AEK
- (Greece) Dimitris Diamantidis – Panathinaikos
- (Greece) Kostas Tsartsaris – Panathinaikos
- (Greece) Lazaros Papadopoulos – Iraklis

=== Best Coach ===
- (Greece) Panagiotis Giannakis– Maroussi

=== Most Improved Player ===
- (Greece) Vassilis Spanoulis – Maroussi

== Clubs in international competitions ==
Team	Competition	Result
Olympiacos	EuroLeague	Top 16, 4th place
Panathinaikos	EuroLeague	Top 16, 4th place
AEK	EuroLeague	Regular season, 6th place
Makedonikos	ULEB Cup	Elimination rounds, Top 16, Home and away format
Ionikos Nea Filadelfeia	ULEB Cup	Regular season, 6th place
Maroussi	FIBA Europe League	Playoffs, Final, 2nd Place
Aris	FIBA Europe League	Playoffs, Quarterfinals, Home and away format
Peristeri	FIBA Europe League	Qualifying round, 5th place
