= 2004–05 Greek Basket League =

2004–05 Greek Basket League season
- League: Greek Basket League
- Sport: Basketball
- Teams: 14

Regular Season
- Season champions: Panathinaikos
- Season MVP: (Greece) Vassilis Spanoulis
- Top scorer: (Greece) Nikos Oikonomou 474 Points (19.2 PPG)

Playoffs

Finals
- Champions: Panathinaikos
- Runners-up: AEK Athens
- Finals MVP: (Slovenia) Jaka Lakovič

Greek Basket League seasons
- ← 2003–04 2005–06 →

The 2004–05 Greek Basket League season was the 65th season of the Greek Basket League, the highest tier professional basketball league in Greece. It was also the 13th season of Greek Basket League that was regulated by HEBA (ESAKE). The winner of the league was Panathinaikos, which beat AEK Athens in the league's playoff's finals series. The clubs MENT and Ionikos Nea Filadelfeia were relegated to the Greek A2 League. The top scorer of the league was Nikos Oikonomou, a player of Panionios.

== Teams ==
Location of teams in Greek A1 Basketball League 2004–05

Club	Home city
AEK Athens	Athens
Apollon Patras	Patras
Aris	Thessaloniki
Ionikos N.F. Amaliadas	Amaliada (Temporarily)
Iraklis	Thessaloniki
MENT	Thessaloniki
Makedonikos	Kozani (Temporarily)
Maroussi	Maroussi, Athens
Olympia Larissa	Larissa
Olympiacos	Piraeus
Panathinaikos	Athens
Panellinios	Athens
Panionios	Nea Smyrni, Athens
PAOK	Thessaloniki

== Regular season ==
Pos	Team	Total							Home		Away	
		Pts	Pld	W	L	F	A	GD	W	L	W	L
1.	Panathinaikos	48	26	22	4	2150	1823	+327	13	0	9	4
2.	Maroussi	45	26	19	7	2089	1926	+163	12	1	7	6
3.	Aris	43	26	17	9	2139	1968	+171	10	3	7	6
4.	Panionios	42	26	16	10	2067	2063	+4	10	3	6	7
5.	PAOK	41	26	15	11	2079	1985	+94	11	2	4	9
6.	AEK Athens	41	26	15	11	2062	1934	+128	9	4	6	7
7.	Makedonikos	40	26	14	12	2043	1985	+58	10	3	4	9
8.	Olympiacos	38	26	12	14	2039	2073	-34	9	4	3	10
9.	Apollon Patras	37	26	11	15	2013	2052	-39	7	6	4	9
10.	Iraklis	37	26	11	15	1872	1973	-101	9	4	2	11
11.	Olympia Larissa	35	26	9	17	1949	2083	-134	8	5	1	12
12.	Panellinios	34	26	8	18	1946	2128	-182	5	8	3	10
13.	MENT	33	26	7	19	1944	2147	-203	5	8	2	11
14.	Ionikos N.F.	32	26	6	20	1936	2188	-252	3	10	3	10

Source: esake.gr, galanissportsdata.com

== Playoffs ==
Quarterfinals
1	Panathinaikos	2
8	Olympiacos	0
4	Panionios	2
5	PAOK	0
2	Maroussi	2
7	Makedonikos	1
3	Aris	1
6	AEK Athens	2

Semifinals
1	Panathinaikos	3
4	Panionios	2
2	Maroussi	1
3	AEK Athens	3

Finals
1	Panathinaikos	3
2	AEK Athens	1
Third place
3	Maroussi	1
4	Panionios	3

=== The finals ===
Panathinaikos	78–62	AEK Athens

AEK Athens	84–79	Panathinaikos

Panathinaikos	79–71	AEK Athens

AEK Athens	71–87	Panathinaikos

== Final standings ==
Pos	Team	Overall record		
		Pld	W	L
1.	Panathinaikos	37	30	7
2.	AEK Athens	37	21	16
3.	Panionios	37	23	14
4.	Maroussi	37	23	14
5.	Aris	29	18	11
6.	PAOK	28	15	13
7.	Makedonikos	29	15	14
8.	Olympiacos	28	12	16
9.	Apollon Patras	26	11	15
10.	Iraklis	26	11	15
11.	Olympia Larissa	26	9	17
12.	Panellinios	26	8	18
13.	MENT	26	7	19
14.	Ionikos N.F.	26	6	20

== Awards ==
=== Greek League MVP ===
- (Greece) Vassilis Spanoulis – Maroussi

=== Greek League Finals MVP ===
- (Slovenia) Jaka Lakovič – Panathinaikos

=== All-Greek League Team ===
- (Greece) Dimitris Diamantidis – Panathinaikos
- (Greece) Vassilis Spanoulis – Maroussi
- (United States) Pete Mickeal – Makedonikos
- (Greece) Nikos Oikonomou – Panionios
- (United States) Travis Watson – Panionios

=== Best Coach ===
- (Serbia) Željko Obradović – Panathinaikos

== Clubs in international competitions ==
Team	Competition	Result
Panathinaikos	EuroLeague	Final-4, 3rd place
AEK	EuroLeague	Top 16, 3rd place
Olympiacos	EuroLeague	Regular season, 7th place
Makedonikos	ULEB Cup	Finals, 2nd Place
Maroussi	ULEB Cup	Quarterfinals, Home and away format
PAOK	ULEB Cup	Quarterfinals, Home and away format
Aris	ULEB Cup	Top 16, Home and away format
Iraklis	FIBA Europe League	Qualifying round, 6th place
Ionikos Nea Filadelfeia	FIBA Europe League	Qualifying round, 7th place
Olympia Larissa	FIBA Europe League	Qualifying round, 7th place
