= 2007–08 Greek Basket League =

2007–08 Greek Basket League season
- League: Greek Basket League
- Sport: Basketball
- Duration: 20 October 2007 – 4 June 2008
- Teams: 14
- TV partner(s): SKAI TV, ERT, Nova Sports

Regular Season
- Season champions: Panathinaikos
- Season MVP: (Greece) Dimitris Diamantidis
- Top scorer: (United States) Anthony Grundy 557 Points (21.4 PPG)

Playoffs

Finals
- Champions: Panathinaikos
- Runners-up: Olympiacos
- Finals MVP: (Greece) Vassilis Spanoulis

Greek Basket League seasons
- ← 2006–07 2008–09 →

The 2007–08 Greek Basket League season was the 68th season of the Greek Basket League, the highest tier professional basketball league in Greece. The winner of the championship was Panathinaikos that won Olympiacos in the finals of the championship.

== Teams ==
Location of teams in Greek Basket League 2007–08

Club	Home city
AEK Athens	Athens
AEL 1964	Larissa
Aigaleo	Aigaleo, Athens
Aris	Thessaloniki
Kolossos Rodou	Rhodes
Maroussi	Maroussi, Athens
Olympia Larissa	Larissa
Olympiacos	Piraeus
Olympias Patras	Patras
Panathinaikos	Athens
Panellinios	Athens
Panionios	Nea Smyrni, Athens
PAOK	Thessaloniki
Rethymno	Rethymno

== Regular season ==
=== Standings ===
Pos	Team	Total							Home				Away			
		Pts	Pld	W	L	F	A	D	W	L	F	A	W	L	F	A
1.	Panathinaikos	49	26	23	3	2319	1857	+462	12	1	1193	939	11	2	1126	918
2.	Olympiacos	48	26	22	4	2208	1835	+373	12	1	1093	834	10	3	1115	1001
3.	Aris	44	26	18	8	1951	1816	+135	10	3	969	862	8	5	982	954
4.	Panionios	40	26	14	12	2022	1935	+87	8	5	1055	936	6	7	967	999
5.	Panellinios	40	26	14	12	2010	1997	+13	8	5	1045	1001	6	7	965	996
6.	Maroussi	39	26	13	13	1930	1934	-4	8	5	980	930	5	8	950	1004
7.	AEK Athens	39	26	13	13	1920	1902	+18	10	3	1025	915	3	10	897	987
8.	Olympia Larissa	38	26	12	14	1834	1856	-22	8	5	952	889	4	9	882	967
9.	Aigaleo	38	26	12	14	2036	2085	-49	8	5	1085	1036	4	9	951	1049
10.	AEL 1964	37	26	11	15	1934	2033	-99	9	4	1033	997	2	11	901	1036
11.	Kolossos Rodou	35	26	9	17	1990	2213	-223	6	7	1002	1067	3	10	988	1146
12.	PAOK	35	26	9	17	1845	1985	-140	7	6	942	940	2	11	903	1045
13.	Rethymno Aegean	35	26	9	17	1836	1922	-86	7	6	920	896	2	11	916	1026
14.	Olympias Patras	29	26	3	23	1793	2258	-465	2	11	947	1145	1	12	846	1113

Pts=Points, Pld=Matches played, W=Matches won, L=Matches lost, F=Points for, A=Points against, D=Points difference

Qualified to League Playoffs
Relegated to HEBA A2

=== Results ===
	AEK	AEL	AIG	ARI	KOL	MAR	OLL	OLP	OLY	PAO	PGS	PAN	PAOK	AGOR
AEK Athens		71-66	77-62	81-70	90-72	76-80	84-66	83-59	77-85	70-66	88-89	72-62	73-64	83-74
AEL 1964	86-78		104-98	69-79	97-76	72-61	75-62	70-60	69-96	77-107	92-88	65-67	74-63	83-62
Aigaleo	78-65	81-71	71-88		71-75	73-72	72-76	102-66	106-112	76-85	87-80	101-99	94-80	73-67
Aris	76-60	72-70		94-67	75-64	72-59	48-58	75-66	75-82	82-75	74-52	71-81	83-73	72-55
Kolossos Rodou	74-79	76-69	67-76	92-89		88-84	68-70	88-77	69-96	65-106	77-90	73-78	80-73	85-80
Maroussi	71-62	90-74	63-71	96-82	84-76		82-69	74-58	66-75	68-79	65-75	72-74	70-57	79-78
Olympia Larissa	71-67	73-75	58-74	75-47	76-66	68-50		96-67	89-92	63-83	58-74	84-73	80-69	61-52
Olympias Patras	68-76	81-75	67-85	80-87	81-107	73-93	67-87		66-103	66-99	68-92	69-70	83-76	78-95
Olympiacos	82-53	84-52	81-61	76-63	106-84	92-73	65-61	100-58		64-82	87-52	100-81	76-66	80-48
Panathinaikos	78-52	94-65	81-76	91-75	105-61	89-93	94-56	108-72	81-77		95-84	84-74	103-73	90-81
Panellinios	77-75	81-95	91-73	80-76	97-77	73-75	80-67	101-75	69-74	67-94		76-74	66-70	87-76
Panionios	90-71	89-60	61-73	71-75	89-65	92-80	75-62	95-67	84-72	78-87	78-60		74-77	79-87
PAOK	64-87	76-66	74-75	71-72	90-79	65-70	79-77	70-64	81-80	68-74	62-58	66-77		76-61
Rethymno Aegean	72-70	68-63	59-70	73-69	85-86	71-60	78-71	51-57	69-71	74-89	65-71	66-57	89-62	

== Playoffs ==
This is the outlook for the 2008 Α1 playoffs. Teams in italics have home advantage. Teams in bold advance to the next round. Numbers to the left of each team indicate the team's original playoffs seeding. Numbers to the right indicate the score of each game.

=== Play-offs ===
Quarter-finals
**1**	**Panathinaikos**	**74**	**78**	–
8	Olympia Larissa	55	58	–
**4**	**Panionios**	**83**	**95**	–
5	Panellinios	70	80	–
**2**	**Olympiacos**	**92**	**70**	–
7	AEK Athens	62	68	–
3	Aris	61	**98**	79
**6**	**Maroussi**	**72**	95	**85**

Semi-finals
**1**	**Panathinaikos**	**91**	**80**	**98**	–	–
4	Panionios	75	76	75	–	–
**2**	**Olympiacos**	**87**	90	**85**	75	**64**
6	Maroussi	61	**97**	69	**86**	63

Finals
**1**	**Panathinaikos**	**83**	55	**78**	57	**90**
2	Olympiacos	79	**71**	67	**59**	76
EuroLeague Match
**4**	**Panionios**	60	65	**89**	**96**	**88**
6	Maroussi	**67**	**76**	82	84	74

== Final standings ==
Pos	Team
1.	Panathinaikos
2.	Olympiacos
3.	Panionios
4.	Maroussi
5.	Aris
6.	Panellinios
7.	AEK Athens
8.	Olympia Larissa
9.	Aigaleo
10.	AEL 1964
11.	Kolossos Rodou
12.	PAOK
13.	Rethymno Aegean
14.	Olympias Patras

2008–09 Euroleague Regular Season
Eurocup 2008–09 Regular Season
Eurocup 2008–09 Qualification Round
EuroChallenge 2008–09 Regular season
Relegation to HEBA A2 2008–09

Greek Basket League 2007–08
Champions
**Panathinaikos**
**29th Title**

== Awards ==
=== Greek League MVP ===
- (Greece) Dimitris Diamantidis – Panathinaikos

=== Greek League Finals MVP ===
- (Greece) Vassilis Spanoulis – Panathinaikos

=== All-Greek League Team ===
- (Greece) Vassilis Spanoulis – Panathinaikos
- (United States) Anthony Grundy – Panellinios
- (Greece) Dimitris Diamantidis – Panathinaikos
- (United States) Jeremiah Massey – Aris
- (Greece) Giannis Bourousis – Olympiacos

=== Best Coach ===
- (Greece) Soulis Markopoulos– Maroussi

=== Defensive Player of the Year ===
- (Greece) Dimitris Diamantidis – Panathinaikos

=== Best Young Player ===
- (Greece) Ian Vougioukas – Rethymno

== Statistical leaders ==
Greek Basket League stats leaders are counted by totals, rather than averages, and include both regular season.

Points

Pos.	Player	Club	Total points
**1.**	(United States) **Anthony Grundy**	Panellinios	**557**
2.	(United States) Jeremiah Massey	Aris	450
3.	(United States) Billy Keys	A.E.L.	442
4.	(United States) J. R. Pinnock	Kolossos	389
5.	(Greece) Makis Nikolaidis	Aigaleo	384

Rebounds

Pos.	Player	Club	Total Rebounds
**1.**	(United States) **K'zell Wesson**	AEK	**223**
2.	(United States) Jeremiah Massey	Aris	216
3.	(Serbia) Dragan Ceranic	A.E.L.	193
4.	(Greece) Giannis Bourousis	Olympiacos	188
5.	(Lithuania) Tadas Klimavičius	A.E.L.	168

Assists

Pos.	Player	Club	Total Assists
**1.**	(Greece) **Vassilis Spanoulis**	Panathinaikos	**125**
2.	(Greece) Dimitris Diamantidis	Panathinaikos	94
3.	(Lithuania) Šarūnas Jasikevičius	Panathinaikos	87
4.	(United States) Billy Keys	A.E.L.	85
5.	(Greece) Fanis Koumpouras	Olympia	79

Steals

Pos.	Player	Club	Total Steals
**1.**	(United States) **Anthony Grundy**	Panellinios	**59**
2.	(United States) Jeremiah Massey	Aris	55
3.	(Greece) Dimitris Diamantidis	Panathinaikos	52
4.	(United States) J. R. Pinnock	Kolossos	51
5.	(United States) Ibrahim Jaaber	Aigaleo	42

Blocks

Pos.	Player	Club	Total Blocks
**1.**	(Lithuania) **Tadas Klimavičius**	A.E.L.	**38**
2.	(Greece) Yiannis Bourousis	Olympiacos	29
3.	(United States) Jeremiah Massey	Aris	24
4.	(Greece) Ian Vougioukas	Rethymno	22
5.	(United States) J. R. Pinnock	Kolossos	19

== Clubs in international competitions ==
Team	Competition	Result
Olympiacos	EuroLeague	Playoffs, Quarter finals
Panathinaikos	EuroLeague	Top 16, 3rd place
Aris	EuroLeague	Top 16, 4th place
Panionios	ULEB Cup	Top 32, Knockout stage
Panellinios	ULEB Cup	Regular season, 6th place
Olympia Larissa	FIBA EuroCup	Qualifying round, 3rd place
PAOK	FIBA EuroCup	Qualifying round, 4th place
AEK	FIBA EuroCup	Second elimination round, Home and away format
Maroussi	FIBA EuroCup	Second elimination round, Home and away format
Olympias Patras	FIBA EuroCup	Second elimination round, Home and away format
