= Greek Basketball League regular season statistical leaders =

The Greek Basketball League regular season statistical leaders are the yearly statistical leaders of the top-tier level Greek Basketball League (GBL)'s regular season phase, since the league first formed its Alpha National Category, starting with the 1963–64 season. The yearly regular season stats leaders in each statistical category are listed by the number of total accumulated stats in a given season, rather than by per game averages, and include only stats from the league's regular season phase.

== Greek Basketball League Regular season Top Scorers (since the 1963–64 season) ==
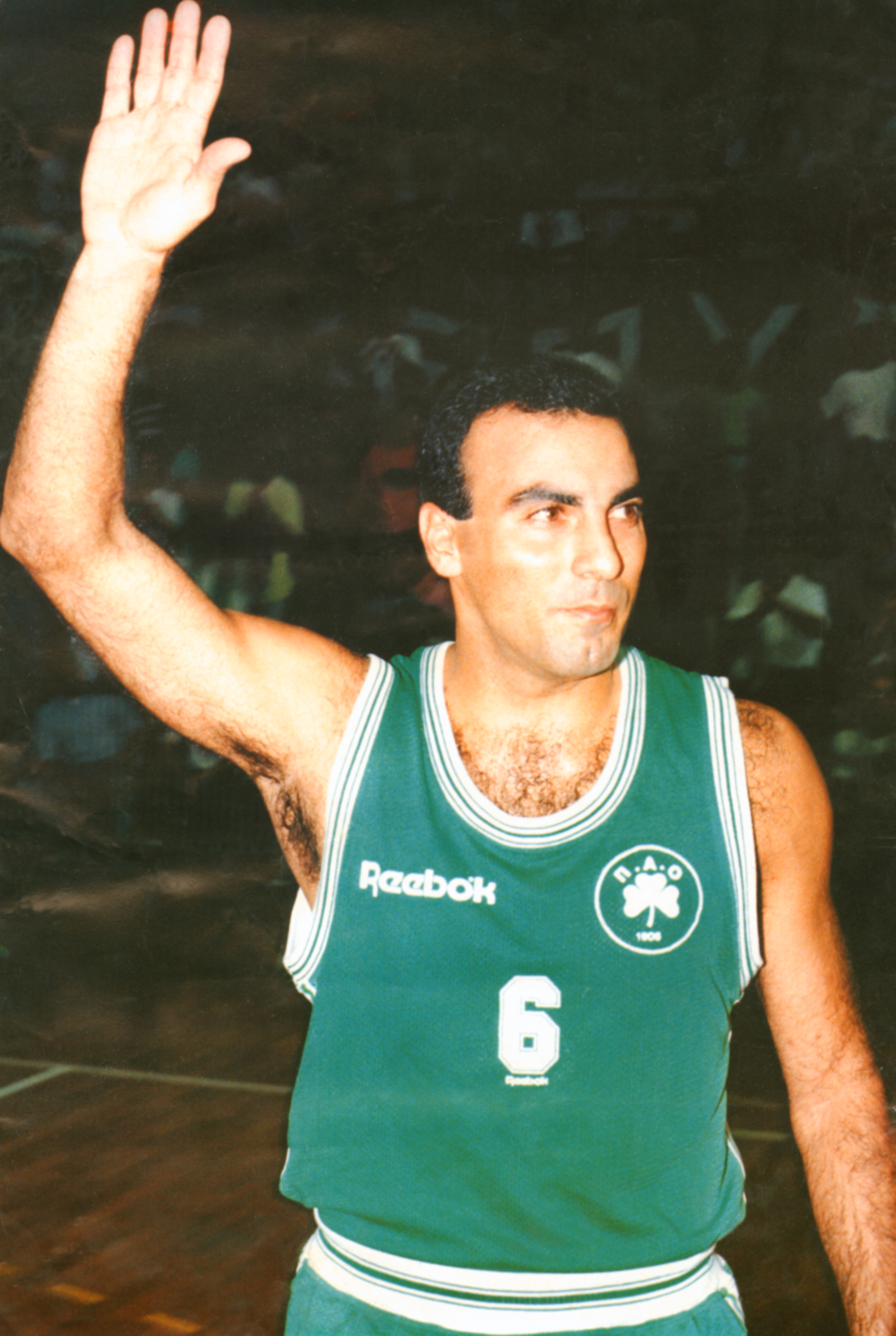
Nikos Galis was the Regular season Top Scorer of the amateur status Greek Basketball Championship eleven consecutive times, from 1981 to 1991.

Sasha Vezenkov was the professional status Greek Basketball League's Regular season Top Scorer two times, in 2015 and 2025.

- The Greek Basketball League (GBL) counts official statistical leaders for the regular season phase of the league by stats totals, and not by per game averages.
- This list includes all of the top scorers of each regular season phase of the Greek Basketball League, from when the league first formed the Alpha National Category, starting with the 1963–64 season.

Source: widgets.baskethotel.com/site/esake

Key
Player (X)	Name of the player and the number of times they had led the league in scoring at that point (if more than one).

Amateur Status Greek Championship Regular season Top Scorer (1963–64 season to 1991–92 season)
Season	Regular season Top Scorer	Team	Points Scored	PPG
1963–64	(Greece) Georgios Kolokithas	Sporting	543	20.8
1964–65	(Greece) Georgios Amerikanos	AEK	464	17.8
1965–66	(Greece) Georgios Kolokithas (2×)	Panathinaikos	432	16.6
1966–67	(Greece) Georgios Kolokithas (3×)	Panathinaikos	438	16.8
1967–68	(Greece) Georgios Amerikanos (2×)	AEK	743	28.5
1968–69	(Greece) Takis Maglos	Pagrati	326	14.8
1969–70	(Greece) Vassilis Goumas	Panellinios	376	17.0
1970–71	(Greece) Paraschos Tsantalis	Panellinios	389	17.6
1971–72	(Greece) Aristeidis Moumoglou	Iraklis	476	21.6
1972–73	(Greece) Kostas Diamantopoulos	Sporting	377	17.1
1973–74	(Greece) Vassilis Goumas (2×)	Panellinios	476	21.6
1974–75	(Greece) Vassilis Goumas (3×)	Panellinios	533	25.1
1975–76	(Greece) Charis Papageorgiou	Aris	639	24.5
1976–77	(Greece) Vassilis Goumas (4×)	Panellinios	522	20.0
1977–78	(Greece) Pavlos Stamelos	Sporting	532	20.4
1978–79	(Greece) Charis Papageorgiou (2×)	Aris	579	22.2
1979–80	(Greece) Panagiotis Giannakis	Ionikos Nikaias	632	24.3
1980–81	(Greece) Nikos Galis	Aris	1.143	44.0
1981–82	(Greece) Nikos Galis (2×)	Aris	828	37.6
1982–83	(Greece) Nikos Galis (3×)	Aris	869	36.2
1983–84	(Greece) Nikos Galis (4×)	Aris	948	41.2
1984–85	(Greece) Nikos Galis (5×)	Aris	891	37.1
1985–86	(Greece) Nikos Galis (6×)	Aris	944	39.3
1986–87	(Greece) Nikos Galis (7×)	Aris	808	38.5
1987–88	(Greece) Nikos Galis (8×)	Aris	756	36.0
1988–89	(Greece) Nikos Galis (9×)	Aris	780	37.1
1989–90	(Greece) Nikos Galis (10x)	Aris	1.041	38.6
1990–91	(Greece) Nikos Galis (11×)	Aris	971	34.7
1991–92	(Federal Republic of Yugoslavia) Žarko Paspalj	Olympiacos	761	33.6

Professional Status Greek Basketball League (GBL) Regular season Top Scorer (1992–93 season to present)
Season	Regular season Top Scorer	Team	Points Scored	PPG
1992–93	(United States) Richard Rellford	Dafni	683	27.3
1993–94	(United States) Mitchell Wiggins	Milon	784	31.4
1994–95	(United States) Walter Berry	Iraklis	761	29.1
1995–96	(United States) Mitchell Wiggins (2×)	Sporting	643	25.2
1996–97	(United States) Alphonso Ford	Papagou	591	26.4
1997–98	(United States) Tony Dawson	Apollon Patras	568	27.2
1998–99	(United States) Alphonso Ford (2×)	Sporting	652	24.3
1999–00	(United States) Alphonso Ford (3×)	Peristeri	586	22.5
2000–01	(United States) Alphonso Ford (4×)	Peristeri	616	23.6
2001–02	(Greece) Nikos Chatzivrettas	Iraklis	578	22.1
2002–03	(Greece) Georgios Diamantopoulos	Panionios	614	26.7
2003–04	(Greece) Nestoras Kommatos	Aris	528	20.8
2004–05	(Greece) Nikos Oikonomou	Panionios	474	19.2
2005–06	(Croatia) Damir Mulaomerović	Panellinios	487	21.2
2006–07	(Bulgaria) Kee Kee Clark	Egaleo	490	18.8
2007–08	(United States) Anthony Grundy	Panellinios	557	21.4
2008–09	(United States) Anthony Grundy (2×)	Panellinios	399	15.7
2009–10	(United States) Josh Childress	Olympiacos	391	16.2
2010–11	(Guyana) Rawle Marshall	PAOK	448	17.2
2011–12	(United States) Dionte Christmas	Rethymno	437	18.2
2012–13	(Greece) Nikos Pappas	Panionios	441	17.7
2013–14	(United States) Errick McCollum	Panionios	446	17.9
2014–15	(Bulgaria) Sasha Vezenkov	Aris	469	18.0
2015–16	(Greece) Loukas Mavrokefalidis	AEK Athens	377	14.5
2016–17	(United States) Will Cummings	Aris	367	14.7
2017–18	(United States) Stefan Moody	Rethymno	391	15.0
2018–19	(Ukraine) Steve Burtt Jr.	Rethymno	493	19.0
2019–20	(United States) Conner Frankamp	Rethymno	397	20.9
2020–21	(Turkey) Kerem Kanter	Kolossos Rodou	382	17.4
2021–22	(United States) Anthony Cowan Jr.	Aris	359	15.0
2022–23	(United States) Marcus Denmon	Peristeri	375	17.0
2023–24	(United States) Hunter Hale	Promitheas Patras	355	17.8
2024–25	(Bulgaria) Sasha Vezenkov (2×)	Olympiacos	382	19.1
2025–26	(United States) Frank Bartley	AEK Athens	396	16.5

== Players with most Top-Scorer awards ==
Player	Awards	Editions
(United States) (Greece) Nick Galis	11	1981-1991
(United States) Alphonso Ford	4	1997, 1999-2001
(Greece) Vassilis Goumas	4	1970, 1974, 1975, 1977
(Greece) Georgios Kolokithas	3	1964, 1966, 1967
(Greece) Georgios Amerikanos	2	1965, 1968
(United States) Anthony Grundy	2	2008, 2009
(United States) Mitchell Wiggins	2	1994, 1996
(Bulgaria) (Cyprus) Sasha Vezenkov	2	2015, 2025
(Greece) Georgios Amerikanos	2	1965, 1968
(Greece) Charis Papageorgiou	2	1976, 1979

== Regular season Performance Index Rating (PIR) leaders (since the 1993–94 season) ==
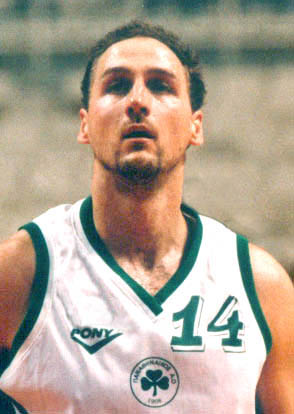
Dino Rađja

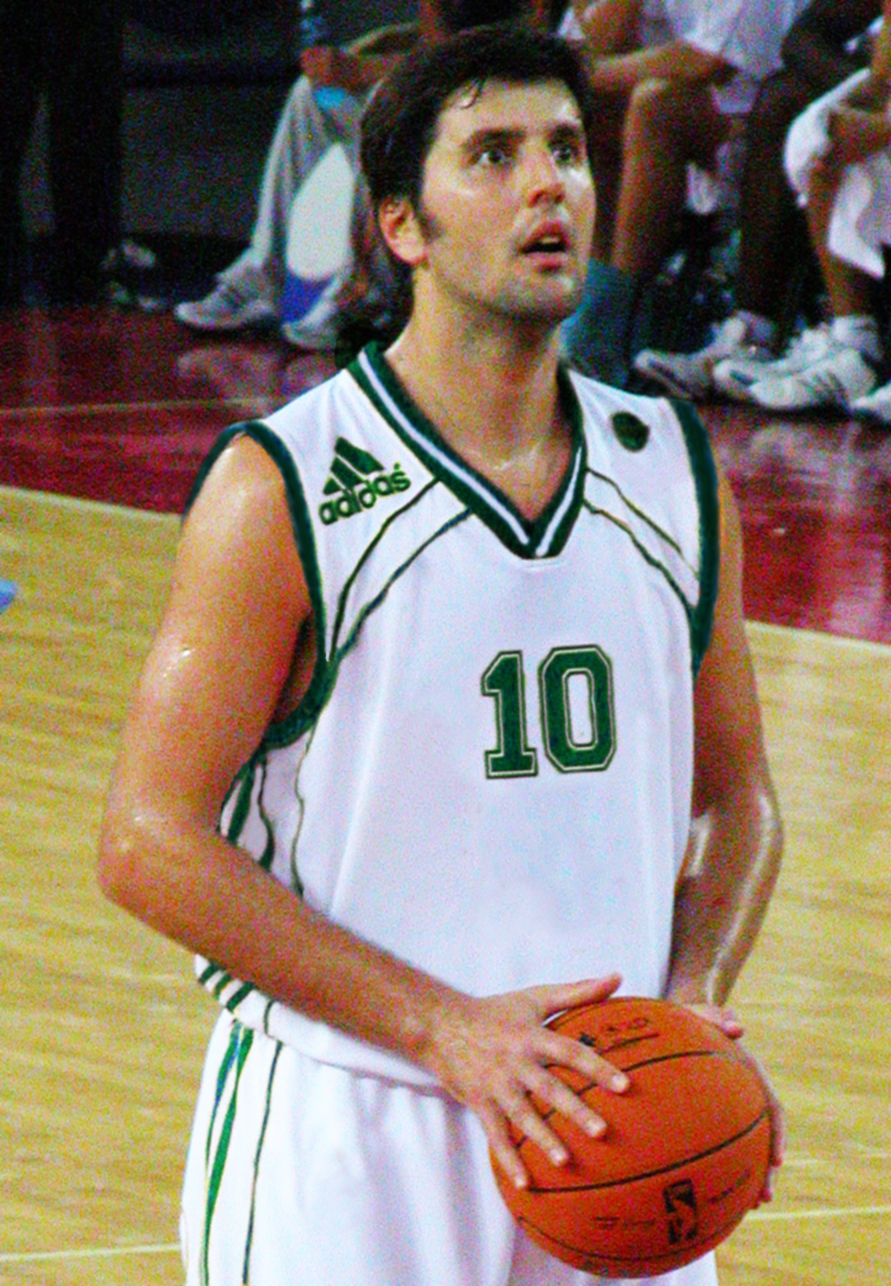
Dejan Bodiroga

- The Greek Basketball League (GBL) counts official statistical leaders by stats totals, and not by per game averages.
- This list includes all of the statistical leaders in Performance Index Rating (PIR) of each regular season phase of the Greek Basketball League, starting with the 1993–94 season.

Source: widgets.baskethotel.com/site/esake

Key
Player (X)	Name of the player and the number of times they had led the league in PIR at that point (if more than one).

Professional Status Greek Basketball League (GBL) Regular season PIR leader (1993–94 season to present)
Season	Regular season PIR leader	Team
1993–94	(United States) Henry Turner	Panionios
1994–95	(United States) Walter Berry	Iraklis
1995–96	(United States) Mitchell Wiggins	Sporting
1996–97	(Cuba) Andrés Guibert	Sporting
1997–98	(Croatia) Dino Rađja	Panathinaikos
1998–99	(United States) Erik Meek	Maroussi
1999–00	(United States) James Forrest	Irakleio
2000–01	(Croatia) Dino Rađja (2×)	Olympiacos
2001–02	(United States) Buck Johnson	Dafni
2002–03	(United States) Ben Handlogten	Makedonikos
2003–04	(Greece) Nestoras Kommatos	Aris
2004–05	(United States) Tyrone Grant	Olympia Larissa
2005–06	(Greece) Loukas Mavrokefalidis	PAOK
2006–07	(United States) Andre Hutson	Panionios
2007–08	(North Macedonia) Jeremiah Massey	Aris
2008–09	(United States) Anthony Grundy	Panellinios
2009–10	(United States) Josh Childress	Olympiacos
2010–11	(Bulgaria) Cedric Simmons	Kavala
2011–12	(United States) Dionte Christmas	Rethymno
2012–13	(United States) Kevin Palmer	KOAD
2013–14	(United States) Chris Evans	Trikala
2014–15	(Bulgaria) Sasha Vezenkov	Aris
2015–16	(United States) Okaro White	Aris
2016–17	(United States) Chris Singleton	Panathinaikos
2017–18	(United States) McKenzie Moore	Lavrio
2018–19	(United States) Davion Berry	Panionios
2019–20	(United States) Conner Frankamp	Rethymno
2020–21	(Turkey) Kerem Kanter	Kolossos Rodou
2021–22	(Bulgaria) Sasha Vezenkov (2×)	Olympiacos
2022–23	(Bulgaria) Sasha Vezenkov (3×)	Olympiacos
2023–24	(Bosnia and Herzegovina) Alec Peters	Olympiacos
2024–25	(Bulgaria) Sasha Vezenkov (4×)	Olympiacos
2025–26	(United States) Ben Moore	PAOK

- In the 2014–15 and 2015–16 seasons, the Greek Basketball League's regular season PIR leader was considered to be an unofficial statistical "MVP award", that was based solely on this statistic. This is not to be confused with the official Greek Basketball League MVP award, which is an award that is based on a voting process, and that is awarded at the end of each season's playoffs.

Season	Regular season PIR leader	Team
2014–15	(Bulgaria) Sasha Vezenkov	Aris
2015–16	(United States) Okaro White	Aris

== Regular season Total Rebounding leaders (since the 1986–87 season) ==
- The Greek Basketball League (GBL) counts official statistical leaders by stats totals, and not by per game averages.
- This list includes all of the statistical leaders in Total Rebounds of each regular season phase of the Greek Basketball League, starting with the 1986–87 season.

Source: widgets.baskethotel.com/site/esake

Key
Player (X)	Name of the player and the number of times they had led the league in rebounding at that point (if more than one).

Amateur Status Greek Championship Regular season Total Rebounding leader (1986–87 season to 1991–92 season)
Season	Regular season Total Rebounding leader	Team	Total	RPG
1986–87	(Greece) Panagiotis Fasoulas	PAOK	624	13.1
1987–88	(Greece) David Stergakos	Panathinaikos	564	12.4
1988–89	(United States) Mark Landsberger	Panionios	542	11.8
1989–90	(United States) Earl Harrison	Pagrati	685	14.2
1990–91	(United States) Earl Harrison (2×)	Pagrati	573	11.4
1991–92	(United States) Antonio Davis	Panathinaikos	639	14.9

Professional Status Greek Basketball League (GBL) Regular season Total Rebounding leader (1992–93 season to present)
Season	Regular season Total Rebounding leader	Team	Total	RPG
1992–93	(United States) Roy Tarpley	Aris	428	16.4
1993–94	(United States) Rod Sellers	Apollon Patras	373	13.7
1994–95	(United States) Walter Berry	Iraklis	344	13.2
1995–96	(Puerto Rico) José Ortiz	Irakleio	321	11.4
1996–97	(Egypt) Samir Gouda	VAO	328	11.1
1997–98	(Croatia) Dino Rađja	Panathinaikos	346	12.7
1998–99	(United States) Erik Meek	Maroussi	251	9.6
1999–00	(Cuba) Andrés Guibert	Near East	286	10.4
2000–01	(Croatia) Dino Rađja (2×)	Olympiacos	306	11.7
2001–02	(United States) Kirk King	Near East	259	9.9
2002–03	(United States) Ben Handlogten	Makedonikos	310	12.9
2003–04	(United States) Travis Watson	Panionios	292	12.1
2004–05	(United States) Travis Watson (2×)	Panionios	236	10.2
2005–06	(North Macedonia) Jeremiah Massey	Gymnastikos S. Larissas	222	9.2
2006–07	(United States) Andre Hutson	Panionios	212	8.8
2007–08	(United States) K'zell Wesson	AEK	223	8.9
2008–09	(United States) Torin Francis	AEL 1964	185	8.8
2009–10	(North Macedonia) Jeremiah Massey (2×)	Olympia Larissa	192	10.6
2010–11	(Bulgaria) Cedric Simmons	Kavala	256	9.8
2011–12	(Australia) Aron Baynes	Ikaros	199	8.6
2012–13	(United States) Kevin Palmer	KAOD	216	8.3
2013–14	(United States) Kenny Gabriel	Rethymno	243	9.3
2014–15	(Senegal) Mouhammad Faye	Rethymno	221	8.5
2015–16	(United States) Dustin Hogue	Nea Kifissia	216	8.3
2016–17	(United States) Keith Clanton	PAOK	240	9.3
2017–18	(United States) Shaquille Goodwin	Rethymno	187	7.5
2018–19	(United States) Sean Evans	Ifaistos Limnou	221	8.8
2019–20	(United States) Sean Evans (2×)	Ifaistos Limnou	186	9.3
2020–21	(Turkey) Kerem Kanter	Kolossos Rodou	162	7.3
2021–22	(The Gambia) Ousman Krubally	Larisa	203	8.8
2022–23	(Croatia) Miro Bilan	Peristeri	176	8.0
2023–24	(United States) Chad Brown	Apollon Patras	163	8.2
2024–25	(United States) Chris Coffey	Peristeri	166	7.5
2025–26	(United States) Ben Moore	PAOK	169	7.0

== Regular season Assists leaders (since the 1988–89 season) ==
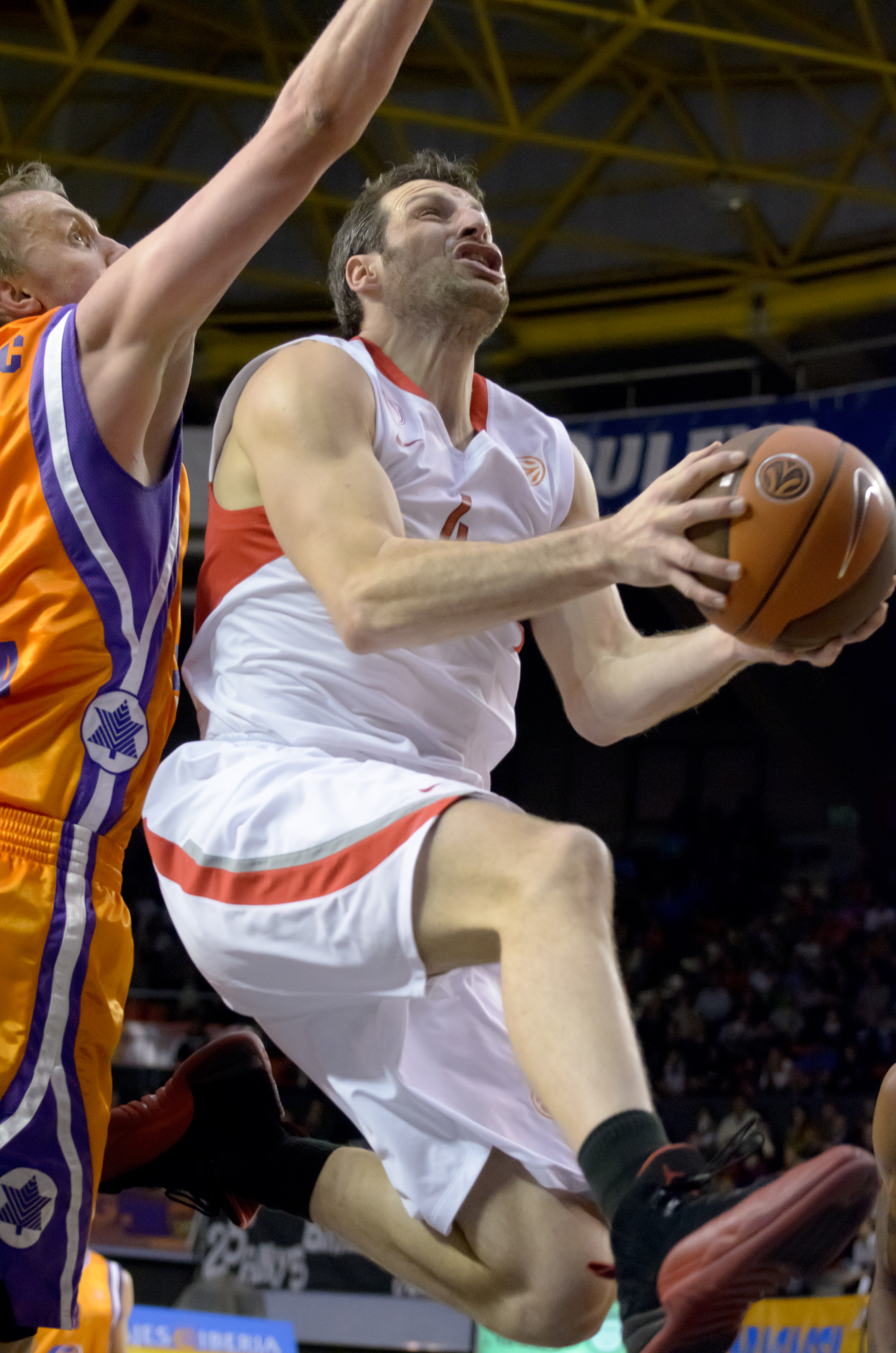
Theo Papaloukas, #4 in white and red

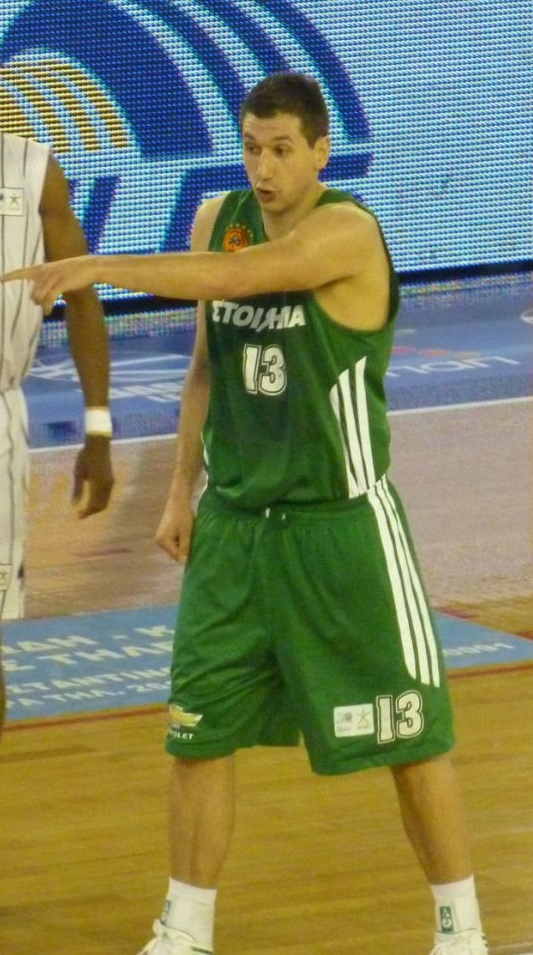
Dimitris Diamantidis

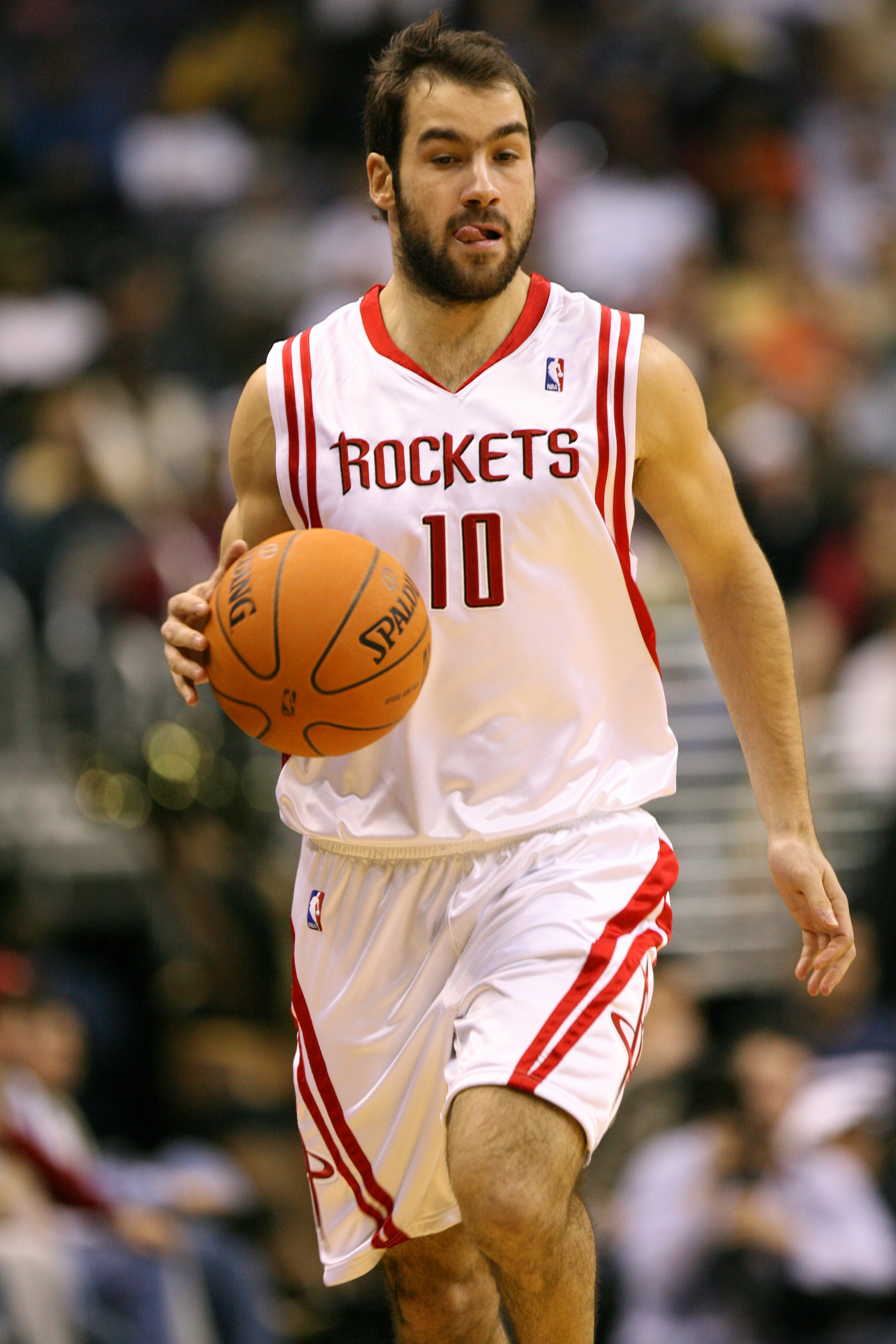
Vassilis Spanoulis

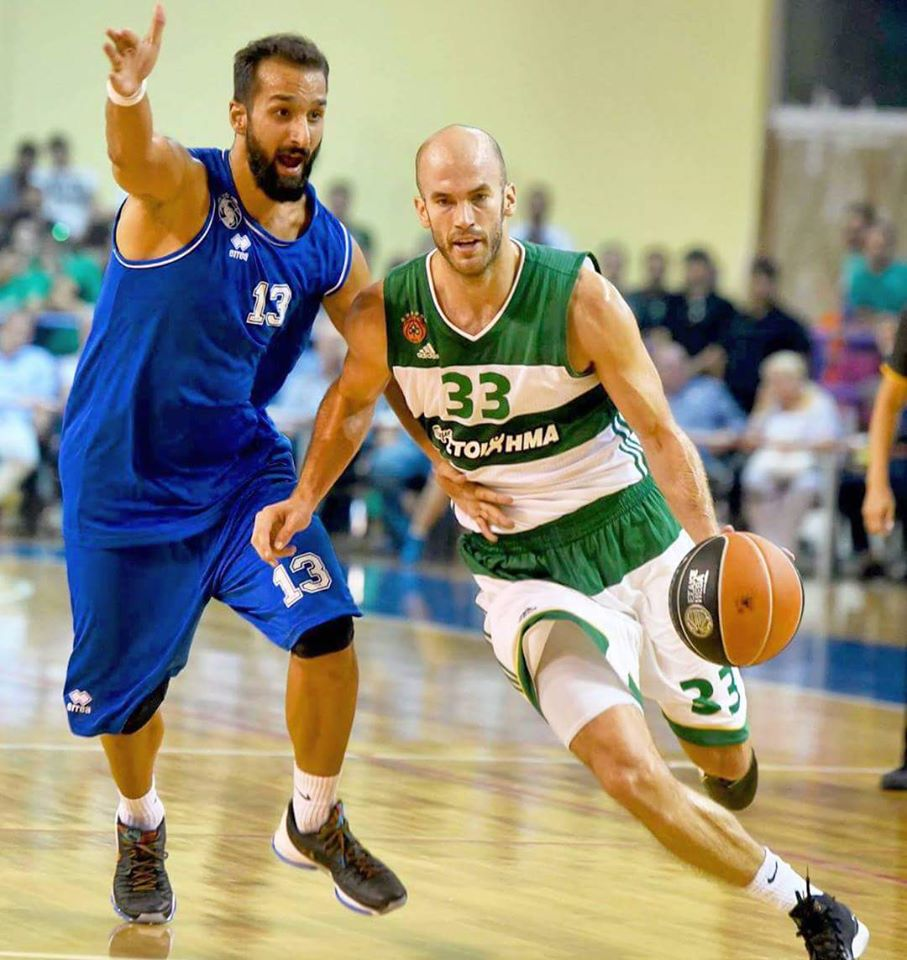
Nick Calathes, #33 in white and green

- The Greek Basketball League (GBL) counts official statistical leaders by stats totals, and not by per game averages.
- This list includes all of the statistical leaders in Assists of each regular season phase of the Greek Basketball League, starting with the 1988–89 season.

Source: widgets.baskethotel.com/site/esake

Key
Player (X)	Name of the player and the number of times they had led the league in rebounding at that point (if more than one).

Amateur Status Greek Championship Regular season Assists leader (1986–87 season to 1991–92 season)
Season	Regular season Assists leader	Team	Total	APG
1988–89	(Greece) Panagiotis Giannakis	Aris	105	4.0
1989–90	(Greece) Jon Korfas	PAOK	123	4.7
1990–91	(Greece) Nikos Galis	Aris	134	4.8
1991–92	(Greece) Nikos Galis (2×)	Aris	93	4.4

Professional Status Greek Basketball League (GBL) Regular season Assists leader (1992–93 season to present)
Season	Regular season Assists leader	Team	Total	APG
1992–93	(Greece) Nikos Galis (3×)	Panathinaikos	175	6.7
1993–94†	(Greece) Stavros Elliniadis	Pagrati	142	5.4
1994–95	(Greece) Lefteris Kakiousis	Iraklis	130	5.2
1995–96	(United States) Byron Dinkins	Panionios	131	5.1
1996–97	(Greece) Nikos Vetoulas	Apollon Patras	138	5.3
1997–98	(Greece) Nikos Vetoulas (2×)	Apollon Patras	155	5.9
1998–99	(United States) Frankie King	PAOK	106	4.5
1999–00	(United States) Byron Dinkins (2×)	Iraklis	107	4.2
2000–01	(Greece) Theo Papaloukas	Panionios	144	5.5
2001–02	(Bulgaria) Roderick Blakney	Iraklis	113	4.7
2002–03	(Greece) Nikos Vetoulas (3×)	Ionikos NF	140	5.3
2003–04	(Croatia) Damir Mulaomerović	PAOK	171	6.8
2004–05	(Croatia) Damir Mulaomerović (2×)	PAOK	119	5.9
2005–06	(Croatia) Damir Mulaomerović (3×)	Panellinios	115	5.0
2006–07	(Greece) Dimitris Diamantidis	Panathinaikos	128	4.9
2007–08	(Greece) Vassilis Spanoulis	Panathinaikos	125	4.8
2008–09	(Greece) Theo Papaloukas (2×)	Olympiacos	100	5.0
2009–10	(United States) Jamon Gordon	Maroussi	108	4.3
2010–11	(United States) Jared Jordan	Kolossos	143	5.7
2011–12	(Greece) Vassilis Spanoulis (2×)	Olympiacos	103	4.9
2012–13	(Greece) Vassilis Spanoulis (3×)	Olympiacos	143	5.7
2013–14	(United States) D. J. Cooper	PAOK	172	6.6
2014–15	(Greece) Vassilis Spanoulis (4×)	Olympiacos	140	6.1
2015–16	(Greece) Nick Calathes	Panathinaikos	163	6.5
2016–17	(Greece) Nick Calathes (2×)	Panathinaikos	145	5.5
2017–18	(Greece) Nick Calathes (3×)	Panathinaikos	182	7.4
2018–19	(Greece) Nick Calathes (4×)	Panathinaikos	151	7.2
2019–20	(Greece) Nick Calathes (5×)	Panathinaikos	137	7.2
2020–21	(Greece) Vassilis Xanthopoulos	Kolossos Rodou	138	6.2
2021–22	(Greece) Vassilis Mouratos	Lavrio	152	6.3
2022–23	(United States) Anthony Cowan Jr.	Promitheas Patras	129	5.8
2023–24	(United States) Joe Ragland	Peristeri	179	8.1
2024–25	(Greece) Nikos Diplaros	Karditsa	134	6.1
2025–26	(United States) Tyree Appleby	Mykonos	137	5.7

== Greek Basketball Championship Regular season Top 5 Scorers (1963–64 season to 1985–86 season) ==
1963–64 season

Rank	Player	Team	Total Points Scored
1st	Georgios Kolokythas	Sporting	536 points
2nd	Giannis Bousios	Iraklis	397 points
3rd	Aristeidis Moumoglou	Iraklis	376 points
4th	Kostas Politis	Panathinaikos	369 points
4th	Antonis Christeas	AEK	369 points

1964–65 season

Rank	Player	Team	Total Points Scored
1st	Georgios Amerikanos	AEK	587 points
2nd	Georgios Barlas	Sporting	487 points
3rd	Georgios Oikonomou	PAOK	467 points
4th	Antonis Lanthimos	Pagrati	422 points
5th	Alekos Kontovounisios	Pagrati	410 points

1965–66 season

Rank	Player	Team	Total Points Scored
1st	Georgios Kolokythas	Panathinaikos	539 points
2nd	Georgios Amerikanos	AEK	509 points
3rd	Takis Maglos	Pagrati	447 points
4th	Antonis Lanthimos	Pagrati	413 points
5th	Aristeidis Moumoglou	Iraklis	400 points

1966–67 season

Rank	Player	Team	Total Points Scored
1st	Georgios Kolokythas	Panathinaikos	705 points
2nd	Georgios Amerikanos	AEK	692 points
3rd	Takis Maglos	Pagrati	541 points
4th	Georgios Barlas	Sporting	507 points
5th	Kostas Diamantopoulos	Sporting	410 points

1967–68 season

Rank	Player	Team	Total Points Scored
1st	Georgios Amerikanos	AEK	694 points
2nd	Antonis Lanthimos	Pagrati	617 points
3rd	Georgios Barlas	Sporting	580 points
4th	Georgios Trontzos	AEK	510 points
5th	Kostas Diamantopoulos	Sporting	482 points

1968–69 season

Rank	Player	Team	Total Points Scored
1st	Takis Maglos	Pagrati	639 points
2nd	Georgios Amerikanos	AEK	622 points
3rd	Vassilis Goumas	Panellinios	583 points
4th	Georgios Kolokythas	Panathinaikos	575 points
5th	Pavlos Stamelos	Sporting	461 points

1969–70 season

Rank	Player	Team	Total Points Scored
1st	Vassilis Goumas	Panellinios	619 points
2nd	Pavlos Stamelos	Sporting	457 points
3rd	Georgios Oikonomou	PAOK	451 points
4th	Georgios Barlas	Sporting	439 points
5th	Kostas Bogatsiotis	Iraklis	420 points

1970–71 season

Rank	Player	Team	Total Points Scored
1st	Paraschos Tsantalis	Panellinios	697 points
2nd	Pavlos Stamelos	Sporting	677 points
3rd	Tasos Kalantidis	Apollon Kalamarias	661 points
4th	Takis Maglos	Pagrati	546 points
5th	Vassilis Goumas	Panellinios	501 points

1971–72 season

Rank	Player	Team	Total Points Scored
1st	Aristeidis Moumoglou	Iraklis	654 points
2nd	Takis Maglos	Pagrati	601 points
3rd	Michalis Giannouzakos	AEK	522 points
4th	Dimitris Fosses	Maroussi	494 points
5th	Vassilis Goumas	Panellinios	464 points

1972–73 season

Rank	Player	Team	Total Points Scored
1st	Kostas Diamantopoulos	Sporting	673 points
2nd	Michalis Giannouzakos	AEK	590 points
3rd	Charis Papageorgiou	Aris	576 points
4th	Apostolos Kontos	Panathinaikos	536 points
5th	Dimitris Fosses	Maroussi	523 points
5th	Vangelis Alexandris	Aris	523 points

1973–74 season

Rank	Player	Team	Total Points Scored
1st	Vassilis Goumas	Panellinios	613 points
2nd	Apostolos Kontos	Panathinaikos	496 points
3rd	Aris Raftopoulos	Pagrati	480 points
4th	Pavlos Stamelos	Sporting	475 points
5th	Dimitris Fosses	Maroussi	450 points

1974–75 season

Rank	Player	Team	Total Points Scored
1st	Vassilis Goumas	Panellinios	643 points
2nd	Charis Papageorgiou	Aris	548 points
3rd	Pavlos Stamelos	Sporting	547 points
4th	Apostolos Kontos	Panathinaikos	529 points
5th	Dionysis Ananiadis	HANTH	399 points

1975–76 season

Rank	Player	Team	Total Points Scored
1st	Charis Papageorgiou	Aris	723 points
2nd	Dimitris Fosses	Maroussi	531 points
3rd	Apostolos Kontos	Panathinaikos	529 points
4th	Vassilis Goumas	Panellinios	515 points
5th	Dionysis Ananiadis	HANTH	399 points

1976–77 season

Rank	Player	Team	Total Points Scored
1st	Vassilis Goumas	Panellinios	670 points
2nd	Makis Dendrinos	Panionios	578 points
3rd	Pavlos Stamelos	Sporting	519 points
4th	Apostolos Kontos	Panathinaikos	507 points
5th	Panagiotis Giannakis	Ionikos Nikaias	502 points

1977–78 season

Rank	Player	Team	Total Points Scored
1st	Pavlos Stamelos	Sporting	601 points
2nd	Vassilis Goumas	Panellinios	570 points
3rd	Panagiotis Giannakis	Ionikos Nikaias	544 points
4th	Dimitris Fosses	Maroussi	510 points
5th	/ Steve Giatzoglou	Olympiacos	488 points

1978–79 season

Rank	Player	Team	Total Points Scored
1st	Charis Papageorgiou	Aris	924 points
2nd	Vassilis Goumas	Panellinios	799 points
3rd	Manthos Katsoulis	PAOK	649 points
3rd	/ Dave Caligaris	Sporting	649 points
5th	Makis Dendrinos	Panionios	646 points

1979–80 season

Rank	Player	Team	Total Points Scored
1st	Panagiotis Giannakis	Ionikos Nikaias	766 points
2nd	/ Dave Caligaris	Sporting	727 points
3rd	/ Nikos Galis	Aris	692 points
4th	Vassilis Goumas	Panellinios	657 points
5th	Apostolos Kontos	Panathinaikos	634 points

1980–81 season

Rank	Player	Team	Total Points Scored
1st	/ Nikos Galis	Aris	1,143 points
2nd	Panagiotis Giannakis	Ionikos Nikaias	774 points
3rd	Manthos Katsoulis	PAOK	670 points
4th	Asterios Zois	Gymnastikos S. Larissas	662 points
5th	Dimitris Fosses	Maroussi	630 points

1981–82 season

Rank	Player	Team	Total Points Scored
1st	/ Nikos Galis	Aris	828 points
2nd	Minas Toukmenidis	VAO Thessaloniki	659 points
3rd	Albert Malach	Panellinios	620 points
4th	Manthos Katsoulis	PAOK	595 points
5th	Vassilis Goumas	AEK	568 points

1982–83 season

Rank	Player	Team	Total Points Scored
1st	/ Nikos Galis	Aris	869 points
2nd	Nikos Stavropoulos	Gymnastikos S. Larissas	723 points
3rd	Vassilis Goumas	AEK	635 points
4th	Minas Gekos	AEK	603 points
5th	Albert Malach	Panellinios	573 points

1983–84 season

Rank	Player	Team	Total Points Scored
1st	/ Nikos Galis	Aris	948 points
2nd	Panagiotis Giannakis	Ionikos Nikaias	854 points
3rd	Minas Toukmenidis	VAO Thessaloniki	668 points
4th	Takis Koroneos	Panathinaikos	609 points
5th	Giannis Tsoumis	Iraklis	538 points

1984–85 season

Rank	Player	Team	Total Points Scored
1st	/ Nikos Galis	Aris	891 points
2nd	Vassilis Goumas	AEK	624 points
3rd	Kostas Alexandridis	Ionikos Nikaias	621 points
4th	Minas Gekos	AEK	594 points
5th	Takis Koroneos	Panathinaikos	576 points

1985–86 season

Rank	Player	Team	Total Points Scored
1st	/ Nikos Galis	Aris	944 points
2nd	Kostas Petropoulos	Apollon Patras	684 points
3rd	Kostas Alexandridis	Ionikos Nikaias	610 points
4th	Apostolos Kontos	AEK	564 points
5th	Argyris Pedoulakis	Peristeri	555 points

== See also ==
- Greek Basketball League career statistical leaders
