= Greek Basketball Championship career statistical leaders =

Greek Basketball Championship career statistical leaders are the all-time stats leaders of the top-tier level Greek Basketball Championship, since the league first formed its A National Category, starting with the 1963–64 season. The all-time stats leaders are divided into separate categories, based on total stats counted since the A National Category of the league was first formed, beginning with the 1963–64 season, total stats counted since the A1 National Category was first formed, beginning with the 1986–87 season, and total stats counted since the 1992–93 season, when the league first became recognized by FIBA as a fully and entirely 100% professional league of basketball.

Only the stats since the 1992–93 season, when the league first became fully professional, are officially counted and recognized. All-time career stats leaders for the Greek Basketball League's history are only officially counted since the 1992–93 season (the professional era of the competition).

== A National Category all-time stats leaders since the 1963–64 season ==
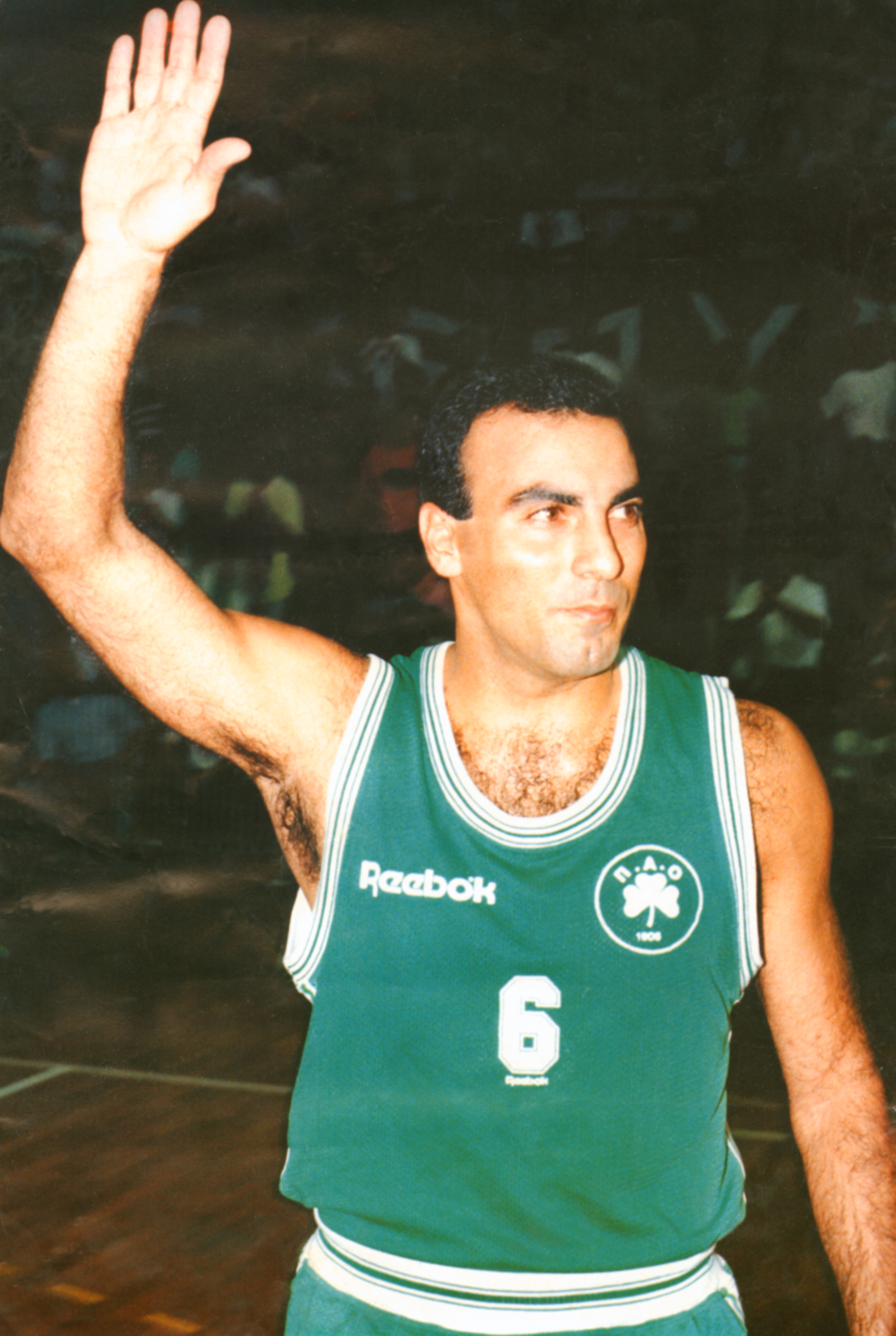
Nikos Galis, the unofficial all-time leading scorer of the amateur era of the Greek Championship (1963–1992)

- This counts all the stats since the Alpha (A) National Category was formed, starting with the 1963–64 season.
- Counting only games played in the A Division, and not counting any games played in the Greek 2nd Division, the Greek Cup, or the Greek Super Cup:
- 1963–64 to 1985–86: A National Category (Stats are not officially recognized.)
- 1986–87 to 1991–92: A1 National Category (Stats are not officially recognized.)
- 1992–93 to 2009–10: HEBA A1 (Stats are officially recognized.)
- 2010–11 to 2023–24: Greek Basket League (Stats are officially recognized.)
- 2024–25 to present: Greek Basketball League (GBL) (Stats are officially recognized.)

== All-time Top 10 scorers ==
Rank	Player	Games played	Points scored	Scoring average	Ref.
1.	(Greece) / (United States) Nikos Galis	384	12,864	33.5	
2.	(Greece) Vassilis Goumas	412	11,030	26.8	
3.	(Greece) Panagiotis Giannakis	493	9,291	18.8	
4.	(Greece) Apostolos Kontos		8,712		
5.	(Greece) Takis Koroneos		7,465		
6.	(Greece) Angelos Koronios	448	7,080	15.8	
7.	(Greece) Dimitris Fosses	408	6,809	16.7	
8.	(Greece) Pavlos Stamelos	361	6,645	18.4	
9.	(Greece) Minas Gekos		6,511		
10.	(Greece) / (United States) Steve Giatzoglou		6,044		

=== Most points scored in one game ===
Rank	Player	Team	Opponent	Points scored	Game score	Season	Date
1.	(Greece) Aristeidis Moumoglou	Iraklis	VAO	145	172–94	1971–72	July 13, 1972
2.	(Greece) Paraskevas Tsantalis	Panellinios	Panionios	73	133–112	1970–71	March 28, 1971
2.	(Greece) Panagiotis Giannakis	Ionikos Nikaias	Aris	73	113–114	1980–81	January 24, 1981
4.	(Greece) / (United States) Nikos Galis	Aris	Ionikos Nikaias	62	114–113	1980–81	January 24, 1981
5.	(Greece) / (United States) Nikos Galis	Aris	Iraklis Thessaloniki	61	103–107	1980–81	March 1, 1981
5.	(Greece) Vassilis Goumas	Panellinos	Amyntas	61	106–70	1970–71	
7.	(Greece) Charis Papageorgiou	Aris	Triton	60	119–80	1978–79	

=== Head coaches with the most games won in the A National Category since the 1963–64 season ===
- (through the 2023–24 season)
- * Denotes active head coaches

Rank	Head coach	Games won	Games lost	Games coached	Winning %	Teams coached in A/A1 categories
1.	(Greece) Giannis Ioannidis	418	71	489	.855	4 (Aris, Gymnastikos S. Larissas, Olympiacos, AEK)
2.	(Serbia) Željko Obradović*	382	65	447	.855	1 (Panathinaikos)
3.	(Greece) Soulis Markopoulos	341	371	712	.479	7 (Dimokritos, Iraklis, PAOK, Aris, Makedonikos, AEK, Maroussi)
4.	(Serbia) Dušan Ivković	335	104	439	.763	5 (Aris, PAOK, Panionios, Olympiacos, ΑΕΚ)
5.	(Greece) Dinos Mourouzis	267	70	337	.792	5 (Triton, Panathinaikos, AEK, Olympiacos, Esperos)
6.	(Greece) Argyris Pedoulakis	261	211	472	.553	7 (Peristeri, Makedonikos, Panellinios, Rethymno, PAOK, AEK, Panathinaikos)
7.	(Greece) Faidon Matthaiou	250	135	385	.649	3 (Olympiacos, AEK, PAOK)
8.	(Greece) Georgios Bartzokas*	239	105	344	.695	4 (Olympia Larissa, Maroussi, Panionios, Olympiacos)
9.	(Serbia) / (Greece) Dragan Šakota*	225	148	373	.603	7 (PAOK, Apollon Patras, Iraklis, Peristeri, Aris, AEK, Olympiacos)
10.	(Greece) Ioannis Sfairopoulos*	209	92	301	.694	3 (Kolossos, Panionios, Olympiacos)
11.	(Greece) Vangelis Alexandris	202	335	537	.376	13 (GS Larissa, PAOK, Apollon Patras, Iraklis, Irakleio, Maroussi, Aris, Olympia Larissa, ΑΕΚ, Kolossos, Kavala, AE Larissa, Panionios)
12.	(Greece) Georgios Kalafatakis	153	229	382	.401	15 (Ampelokipoi, Irakleio, AEK, Dafni, Ionikos NF, Panionios, Makedonikos, Panellinios, AEL, PAOK, Olympia Larissa, Iraklis, KAOD, Ikaros Chalkidas, Rethymno)

== A1 National Category all-time cumulative stats leaders since the 1986–87 season ==
- This counts only the stats since the two divisions were formed, starting with the 1986–87 season.
- Counting only games played in the A1 Division, and not counting any games played in the Greek 2nd Division, the Greek Cup, or the Greek Supercup:
- 1986–87 to 1991–92: A1 National Category (Stats are not officially recognized.)
- 1992–93 to 2009–10: HEBA A1 (Stats are officially recognized.)
- 2010–11 to 2023–24: Greek Basket League (Stats are officially recognized.)
- 2024–25 to present: Greek Basketball League (GBL) (Stats are officially recognized.)
- *Currently active players in the A1 Division (Greek Basketball League)
- Last update: through the 2023–24 season

=== Games played ===
Rank	Player	Games played
1.	(Greece) Nikos Boudouris	574
2.	(Greece) Nikos Chatzis	554
3.	(Greece) Fragiskos Alvertis	534
4.	(Greece) Dimitris Diamantidis	525
5.	(Greece) Vassilis Xanthopoulos	505
6.	(Greece) Vassilis Spanoulis	499
7.	(Greece) Georgios Kalaitzis	492
8.	(Greece) Georgios Sigalas	483
9.	(Greece) Dimitris Papanikolaou	466
10.	(Greece) Kostas Tsartsaris	462
11.	(Greece) Manos Papamakarios	452

=== Points scored ===
Rank	Player	Points scored
1.	(Greece) Angelos Koronios	7,080
2.	(Greece) Nikos Galis	6,549
3.	(Greece) Vassilis Spanoulis	5,517
4.	(Greece) Nikos Chatzis	5,200
5.	(Federal Republic of Yugoslavia) / (Greece) Bane Prelević	5,004
6.	(Greece) Panagiotis Liadelis	4,806
7.	(Greece) Fragiskos Alvertis	4,698
8.	(Greece) Dimitris Diamantidis	4,549
9.	(Greece) / (United States) Jon Korfas	4,534
10.	(Federal Republic of Yugoslavia) Žarko Paspalj	4,104

=== Total rebounds ===
Rank	Player	Total rebounds
1.	(Greece) Panagiotis Fasoulas	3,097
2.	(Greece) Kostas Tsartsaris	2,173
3.	(Croatia) Stojko Vranković	2,138
4.	(Greece) Dimitris Diamantidis	1,948
5.	(Greece) Fanis Christodoulou	1,890
6.	(Greece) Georgios Karagkoutis	1,877
7.	(Greece) Ioannis Bourousis	1,803
8.	(United States) Walter Berry	1,765
9.	(Greece) Georgios Sigalas	1,719
10.	(Greece) Lazaros Papadopoulos	1,695

=== Assists ===
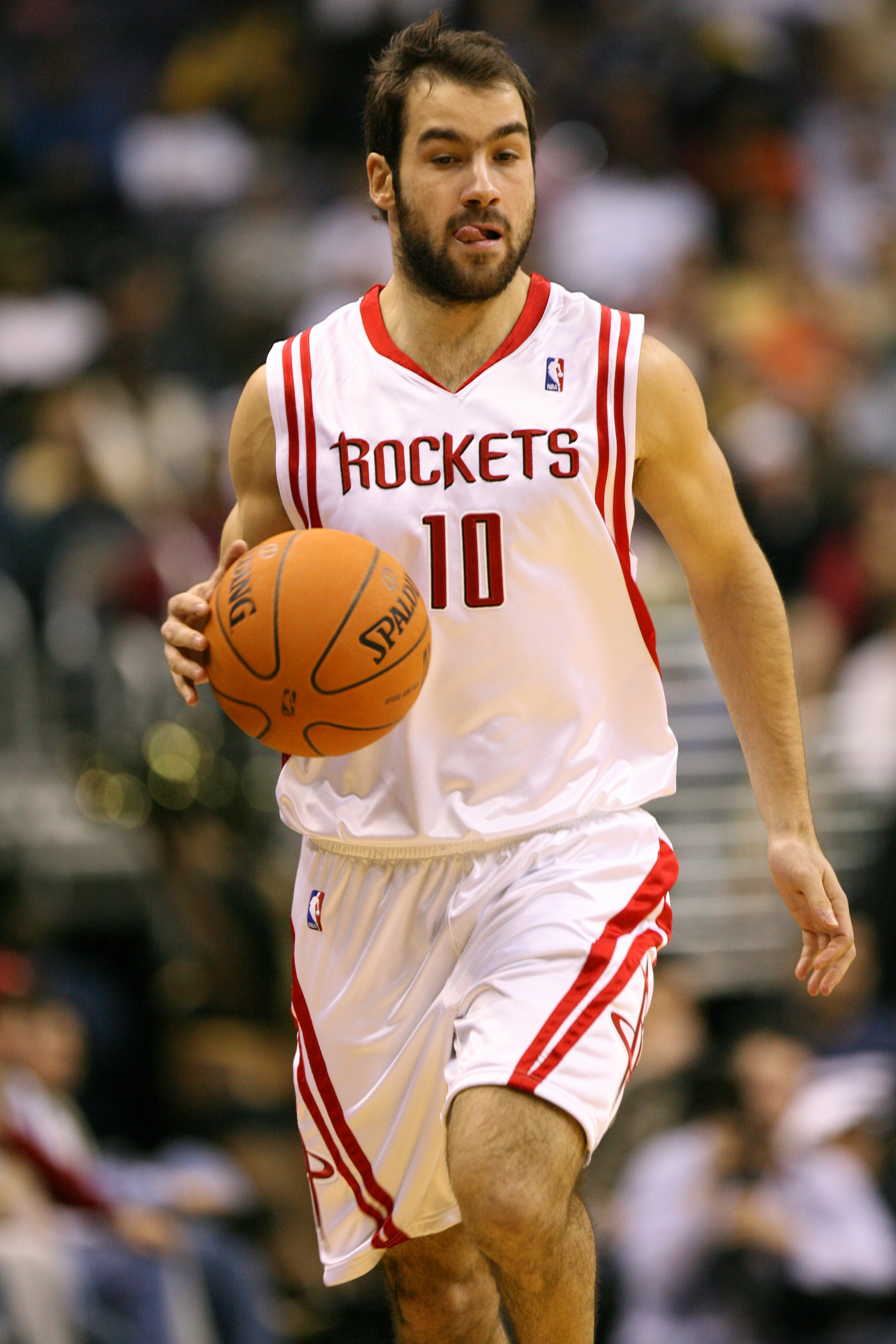
Vassilis Spanoulis, the career assists leader in Greek Championship history (1963–present)

Rank	Player	Assists
1.	(Greece) Vassilis Spanoulis	2,180
2.	(Greece) Dimitris Diamantidis	2,144
3.	(Greece) Vassilis Xanthopoulos	1,607
4.	(Greece) / (United States) Nick Calathes	1,285
5.	(Greece) Angelos Koronios	1,264
6.	(Greece) Nikos Vetoulas	1,093
7.	(Greece) Georgios Sigalas	1,060
8.	(Greece) / (United States) Jon Korfas	1,059
9.	(Greece) Nikos Boudouris	979
10.	(Greece) Nikos Chatzis	928

=== Steals ===
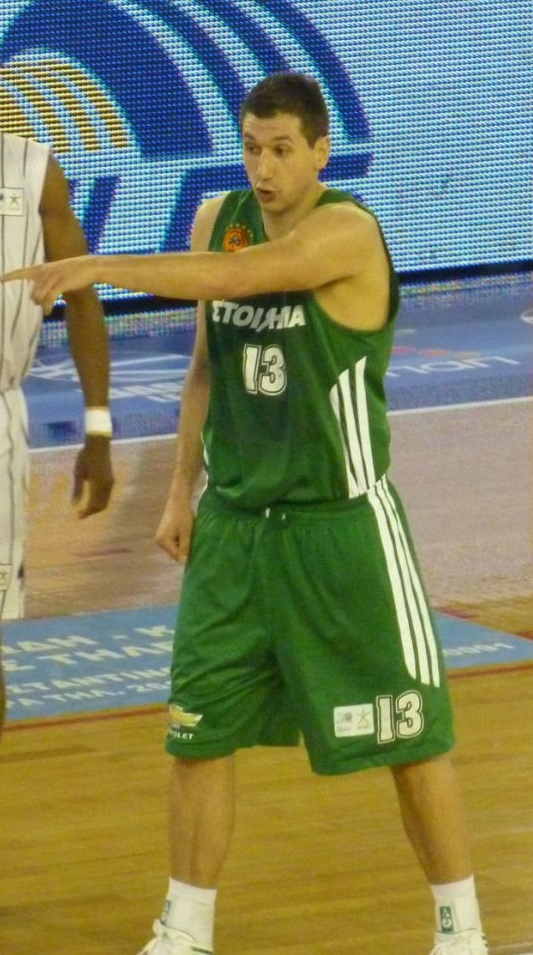
Dimitris Diamantidis, the all-time steals leader of the Greek Championship (1963–present)

Rank	Player	Steals
1.	(Greece) Dimitris Diamantidis	785
2.	(Greece) Vassilis Xanthopoulos	594
3.	(Greece) Angelos Koronios	583
4.	(Greece) Georgios Sigalas	547
5.	(Greece) Manos Papamakarios	520
6.	(Greece) Nikos Boudouris	514
7.	(Greece) Nikos Vetoulas	470
8.	(Greece) Vassilis Spanoulis	436
9.	(Greece) Michalis Pelekanos	428
10.	(Greece) Nikos Chatzis	415

=== Blocks ===
Rank	Player	Blocks
1.	(Greece) Panagiotis Fasoulas	929
2.	(Croatia) Stojko Vranković	610
3.	(Federal Republic of Yugoslavia) / (Greece) Dragan Tarlać	256
4.	(Greece) Dimitris Diamantidis	228
5.	(United States) Walter Berry	227
6.	(Greece) Kostas Tsartsaris	224
7.	(Greece) Ioannis Bourousis	221
8.	(Russia) / (Greece) Anatoly Zourpenko	208
9.	(United States) Tony Costner	193
10.	(Greece) Ioannis Papagiannis	192

=== 3 pointers made ===
Rank	Player	3 pointers made
1.	(Greece) Angelos Koronios	855
2.	(Greece) / (United States) Jon Korfas	686
3.	(Greece) Vassilis Spanoulis	634
4.	(Greece) Dimitris Diamantidis	626
5.	(Greece) Nikos Chatzis	617
6.	(Greece) Fragiskos Alvertis	616
7.	(Federal Republic of Yugoslavia) / (Greece) Bane Prelević	592
8.	(Greece) Makis Nikolaidis	588
9.	(Greece) Manos Papamakarios	523
10.	(Greece) Fanis Christodoulou	519

== International players with the most games played since the 1986–87 season ==
A1 National Category all-time cumulative stats leaders.

- Some players also have dual nationality, which is noted in those cases.
- Last update: through the 2023–24 season

Rank	Player	Games played
1.	(United States) Mike Batiste	303
2.	(Federal Republic of Yugoslavia) / (Greece) Bane Prelević	288
3.	(United States) / (Bulgaria) Roderick Blakney	239
4.	(Germany) Michael Koch	207
5.	(United States) James Gist	192
6.	(Serbia) / (Greece) Vladimir Petrović-Stergiou	189
6.	(Federal Republic of Yugoslavia) Žarko Paspalj	189
8.	(Italy) Claudio Coldebella	187
9.	(United States) Walter Berry	174
9.	(Germany) Stephen Arigbabu	174
11.	(United States) Mitchell Wiggins	173
12.	(United States) / (Belgium) Matt Lojeski	164
13.	(Croatia) Stojko Vranković	163

== Top scoring international players since the 1986–87 season ==
A1 National Category all-time cumulative stats leaders.

- Some players also have dual nationality, which is noted in those cases.
- Last update: through the 2023–24 season

Rank	Player	Points scored
1.	(Federal Republic of Yugoslavia) / (Greece) Bane Prelević	5,004
2.	(Federal Republic of Yugoslavia) Žarko Paspalj	4,104
3.	(United States) Walter Berry	3,579
4.	(United States) David Ancrum	3,501
5.	(United States) Alphonso Ford	3,378
6.	(United States) Mitchell Wiggins	3,172
7.	(Bulgaria) / (United States) Roderick Blakney	3,037
8.	(United States) Mike Batiste	2,970
9.	(United States) Melvin Cheatum	2,960
10.	(United States) Buck Johnson	2,752
11.	(United States) Byron Dinkins	2,702
