= 2001–02 Greek Basket League =

2001–02 Greek Basket League season
- League: Greek Basket League
- Sport: Basketball
- Teams: 14

Regular Season
- Season champions: AEK Athens
- Season MVP: (Greece) Dimos Dikoudis
- Top scorer: (Greece) Nikos Chatzivrettas 578 Points (22.1 PPG)

Playoffs

Finals
- Champions: AEK Athens
- Runners-up: Olympiacos
- Finals MVP: (Greece) Dimos Dikoudis

Greek Basket League seasons
- ← 2000–01 2002–03 →

The 2001–02 Greek Basket League season was the 62nd season of the Greek Basket League, the highest tier professional basketball league in Greece. It was also the 10th season of Greek Basket League championship that was regulated by HEBA (ESAKE). The winner of the league was AEK Athens, which beat Olympiacos in the league's playoff's finals. The clubs Dafni and KAOD were relegated to the Greek A2 League. The top scorer of the league was Nikos Chatzivrettas, a player of Iraklis. Dimos Dikoudis, player of AEK Athens, was named the MVP of the league.

== Teams ==
Location of teams in Greek Basket League 2001–02

Club	Home city
AEK Athens	Athens
Aris	Thessaloniki
Dafni	Dafni, Athens
Ionikos Nea Filadelfeia	Nea Filadelfeia, Athens
Irakleio	Irakleio
Iraklis	Thessaloniki
KAOD	Drama
Maroussi	Maroussi, Athens
Near East	Kaisariani, Athens
Olympiacos	Piraeus
Panathinaikos	Athens
Panionios	Nea Smyrni, Athens
PAOK	Thessaloniki
Peristeri	Peristeri, Athens

== Regular season ==
Pos	Team	Total							Home		Away	
		Pts	Pld	W	L	F	A	GD	W	L	W	L
1.	AEK Athens	49	26	23	3	2302	1948	354	13	0	10	3
2.	Panathinaikos	47	26	21	5	2181	2006	175	13	0	8	5
3.	Olympiacos	46	26	20	6	2247	1961	286	11	2	9	4
4.	Iraklis	43	26	17	9	1974	1856	118	12	1	5	8
5.	Panionios	40	26	14	12	2078	2002	76	9	4	5	8
6.	Peristeri	40	26	14	12	1987	2008	-21	10	3	4	9
7.	Maroussi	39	26	13	13	2138	2127	11	8	5	5	8
8.	PAOK	38	26	12	14	2120	2115	5	11	2	1	12
9.	Irakleio	37	26	11	15	2131	2159	-28	7	6	4	9
10.	Aris	35	26	9	17	2098	2206	-108	6	7	3	10
11.	Ionikos N.F.	34	26	8	18	2094	2331	-237	4	9	4	9
12.	Near East	33	26	7	19	1983	2164	-181	6	7	1	12
13.	KAO Dramas	33	26	7	19	2079	2350	-271	6	7	1	12
14.	Dafni	32	26	6	20	2000	2179	-179	5	8	1	12

Source: esake.gr, galanissportsdata.com

== Playoffs ==
=== Positions 1-6 ===
Quarterfinals
4	Iraklis	2
5	Panionios	1
3	Olympiacos	2
6	Peristeri	1

Semifinals
1	AEK Athens	2
4	Iraklis	0
2	Panathinaikos	0
3	Olympiacos	2

Finals
1	AEK Athens	3
3	Olympiacos	2

=== Positions 7-12 ===
Quarterfinals
10	Aris	2
11	Ionikos	1
9	Irakleio	2
12	Near East	1

Semifinals
7	Maroussi	2
10	Aris	0
8	PAOK	2
9	Irakleio	1

Finals
7	Maroussi	2
8	PAOK	1

=== The finals ===
AEK Athens	74–82	Olympiacos

Olympiacos	75–70	AEK Athens

AEK Athens	85–78	Olympiacos

Olympiacos	60–61	AEK Athens

AEK Athens	79–70	Olympiacos

== Final standings ==
Pos	Team	Overall record		
		Pld	W	L
1.	AEK Athens	33	28	5
2.	Olympiacos	36	26	10
3.	Panathinaikos	28	21	7
4.	Iraklis	31	19	12
5.	Panionios	29	15	14
6.	Peristeri	29	15	14
7.	Maroussi	31	17	14
8.	PAOK	32	15	17
9.	Irakleio	32	14	18
10.	Aris	31	11	20
11.	Ionikos N.F.	29	9	20
12.	Near East	29	8	21
13.	KAO Dramas	26	7	19
14.	Dafni	26	6	20

== Top Players ==
Category	Player	Team	Average
Points	Nikos Hatzivrettas	Iraklis	22,2
Rebounds	Kirk King	Marousi	9,9
Assists	Theodoros Papaloukas	Olympiacos	4,1
Steals	Nikos Vetoulas	Near East	2,5
Blocks	Anatoly Zourpenko	Near East	1,6

== Clubs in international competitions ==
Team	Competition	Result
Panathinaikos	EuroLeague	Final 4, 1st place
Olympiacos	EuroLeague	Top 16, 2nd place
AEK	EuroLeague	Top 16, 3rd place
Peristeri	EuroLeague	Regular season, 7th place
Panionios	FIBA Saporta Cup	Quarterfinals, Home and away format
Iraklis	FIBA Saporta Cup	Round of 16, Home and away format
Maroussi	FIBA Korać Cup	Semifinals, Home and away format
PAOK	FIBA Korać Cup	Round of 32, 3rd place
