= 2000–01 Greek Basket League =

2000–01 Greek Basket League season
- League: Greek Basket League
- Sport: Basketball
- Teams: 14

Regular Season
- Season champions: Panathinaikos
- Season MVP: (United States) Alphonso Ford
- Top scorer: (United States) Alphonso Ford 576 Points (23.6 PPG)

Playoffs

Finals
- Champions: Panathinaikos
- Runners-up: Olympiacos
- Finals MVP: (Federal Republic of Yugoslavia) Željko Rebrača

Greek Basket League seasons
- ← 1999–2000 2001–02 →

The 2000–01 Greek Basket League season was the 61st season of the Greek Basket League, the highest tier professional basketball league in Greece. It was also the 9th season of Greek Basket League championship that was regulated by HEBA (ESAKE). The winner of the league was Panathinaikos, which beat Olympiacos in the league's playoff's finals. The clubs Milon and Makedonikos were relegated to the Greek A2 League. The top scorer of the league was Alphonso Ford, a player of Peristeri. Alphonso Ford was also named the MVP of the league.

== Teams ==
Location of teams in Greek Basket League 2000–01

Club	Home city
AEK Athens	Athens
Aris	Thessaloniki
Dafni	Dafni, Athens
Irakleio	Irakleio
Iraklis	Thessaloniki
Maroussi	Maroussi, Athens
Makedonikos	Thessaloniki
Milon	Nea Smyrni, Athens
Near East	Kaisariani, Athens
Olympiacos	Piraeus
Panathinaikos	Athens
Panionios	Nea Smyrni, Athens
PAOK	Thessaloniki
Peristeri	Peristeri, Athens

== Regular season ==
Pos	Team	Total							Home		Away	
		Pts	Pld	W	L	F	A	GD	W	L	W	L
1.	Panathinaikos	48	26	22	4	2173	1855	+318	13	0	9	4
2.	Peristeri	48	26	22	4	2130	1835	+295	13	0	9	4
3.	Olympiacos	47	26	21	5	2181	1948	+233	12	1	9	4
4.	AEK Athens	46	26	20	6	2207	1947	260	12	1	8	5
5.	Panionios	42	26	16	10	2211	2026	185	12	1	4	9
6.	Iraklis	42	26	16	10	2152	2144	8	9	4	7	6
7.	PAOK	39	26	13	13	1979	2017	-38	8	5	5	8
8.	Maroussi	37	26	11	15	2229	2212	17	9	4	2	11
9.	Dafni	36	26	10	16	2091	2149	-58	7	6	3	10
10.	Irakleio	35	26	9	17	2135	2256	-121	7	6	2	11
11.	Near East	34	26	8	18	2021	2184	-163	6	7	2	11
12.	Aris	33	26	7	19	1969	2250	-281	6	7	1	12
13.	Milon	30	26	4	22	2058	2426	-368	3	10	1	12
14.	Makedonikos	29	26	3	23	1997	2284	-287	2	11	1	12

Source: esake.gr, galanissportsdata.com

== Playoffs ==
=== Positions 1-6 ===
Quarterfinals
4	AEK Athens	2
5	Panionios	0
3	Olympiacos	2
6	Iraklis	0

Semifinals
1	Panathinaikos	2
4	AEK Athens	0
2	Peristeri	0
3	Olympiacos	2

Finals
1	Panathinaikos	3
3	Olympiacos	2

=== Positions 7-12 ===
Quarterfinals
10	Irakleio	1
11	Near East	2
9	Dafni	2
12	Aris	0

Semifinals
7	PAOK	2
10	Near East	0
8	Maroussi	2
9	Dafni	0

Finals
7	PAOK	0
8	Maroussi	2

=== The finals ===
Panathinaikos	83–70	Olympiacos

Olympiacos	88–84	Panathinaikos

Panathinaikos	73–57	Olympiacos

Olympiacos	80–74	Panathinaikos

Panathinaikos	79–63	Olympiacos

== Final standings ==
Pos	Team	Overall record		
		Pld	W	L
1.	Panathinaikos	33	27	6
2.	Olympiacos	35	27	8
3.	Peristeri	28	22	6
4.	AEK Athens	30	22	8
5.	Panionios	28	16	12
6.	Iraklis	28	16	12
7.	Maroussi	30	15	15
8.	PAOK	31	15	16
9.	Dafni	30	12	18
10.	Near East	32	11	21
11.	Irakleio	29	10	19
12.	Aris	28	7	21
13.	Milon	26	4	22
14.	Makedonikos	26	3	23

== Top Players ==
Category	Player	Team	Average
Points	Alphonso Ford	Peristeri	23,6
Rebounds	Dino Rađa	Olympiacos	11,4
Assists	Theodoros Papaloukas	Panionios	5,7
Steals	Alvin Sims	Makedonikos	2,8
Blocks	Anatoly Zourpenko	Near East	1,5

== Clubs in international competitions ==
Team	Competition	Result
AEK	EuroLeague	Playoffs, Semifinals
Olympiacos	EuroLeague	Playoffs, Quarterfinals
PAOK	EuroLeague	Playoffs, Round of 16
Peristeri	EuroLeague	Playoffs, Round of 16
Panathinaikos	FIBA SuproLeague	Final Four, 2nd place
Iraklis	FIBA SuproLeague	Playoffs, Round of 16
Maroussi	FIBA Saporta Cup	Final, 1st place
Aris	FIBA Saporta Cup	Top 16, Home and away format
Near East	FIBA Korać Cup	Playoffs, Round of 16, Home and away format

NOTE: 2000-01 was the only season where Europe had two continental champions as a result of the dispute between FIBA and newly founded Euroleague Basketball Company. After its first season, FIBA Suproleague was abolished and merged with the EuroLeague.
