= Basketball at the 1971 Mediterranean Games =

The 1971 Mediterranean Games football tournament was the 6th edition of the Mediterranean Games men's basketball tournament. The basketball tournament was held in İzmir Atatürk Volleyball Hall, İzmir, Turkey between the 7–11 October 1971 as part of the 1971 Mediterranean Games.

== Medalists ==
| Event | Gold | Silver | Bronze |
|---|---|---|---|
| Men | Yugoslavia | Turkey | Greece |

=== Standings ===
| Rank | Team |
|---|---|
| 1st place, gold medalist(s) | Yugoslavia Blagoja Georgievski, Dragan Kićanović, Vinko Jelovac, Stanislav Bizjak, Miroljub Damjanović, Davor Tasec, Žarko Zečević, Damir Šolman, Goran Latifić, Zoran Nestorović, Milun Marović. Coach: Ranko Žeravica |
| 2nd place, silver medalist(s) | Turkey Nuri Tan, Barış Küce, Nur Germen, Battal Durusel, Cihat İlkbaşaran, Kemal Erdenay, Ferhan Baras, Hüseyin Kozluca, Zeki Tosun, Erdim Öztokat, Doğan Hakyemez, Hüseyin Alp. Coach: Mehmet Baturalp |
| 3rd place, bronze medalist(s) | Greece Giorgos Mparlas, Thanasis Christoforou, Kostas Diamantopoulos, Michalis Giannouzakos, Christos Iordanidis, Makis Katsafados, Apostolos Kontos, Kostas Mpogatsiotis, Ioannis Politis, Aris Raftopoulos, Pavlos Stamelos, Georgios Trontzos. Coach: Themis Cholevas |
| 4 | Egypt Mambouh Shoukr, Khalid Abou Ouf, Salah, Fattah, Sayed Tewfik El-Sayed, Fahti Mohamed Kamel, Adel Ibrahim Ismail, Ismail Selim Mohamed, El-Sayed Abdel Hamid Mobarak, Mohamed Essam Khaled, Kamal Kamel Mohammed. |
| 5 | Syria George Jarbaka, Jack Atteh, Hazem Samman, Nabil Kurdi, Mohammad Khalili, Mohammad Zuhair Al-Absi, Fawaz Kikhia, Mumtaz Malas, Shamel Dagestani. |
| 6 | Tunisia Abdelkader Ben Ali, Mustapha Bouchnak, Taoufik Bouhima, Béchir Guermassi, Mahomede, Ali Karabi, Kaïs Mrad, Mourad Azzabi, Faouzi Ben Brahim. |
| 7 | Morocco Bouchaib, Badreddine, Abderrazak, Khalil El-Yamani, Moulay Ahmed Riadh, Abderrahmane Sebbar, Allal Bel Caid, Abdelhanine El Oufir, Mahjoub. |
