= 2002–03 Greek Basket League =

2002–03 Greek Basket League season
- League: Greek Basket League
- Sport: Basketball
- Teams: 14

Regular Season
- Season champions: Panathinaikos
- Season MVP: (Greece) Fragiskos Alvertis
- Top scorer: (Greece) Georgios Diamantopoulos 635 Points (26.7 PPG)

Playoffs

Finals
- Champions: Panathinaikos
- Runners-up: AEK Athens
- Finals MVP: (Slovenia) Jaka Lakovič

Greek Basket League seasons
- ← 2001–02 2003–04 →

The 2002–03 Greek Basket League season was the 63rd season of the Greek Basket League, the highest tier professional basketball league in Greece. It was also the 11th season of the Greek Basket League championship that was regulated by HEBA (ESAKE). The winner of the league was Panathinaikos, which beat AEK Athens in the league's payoff's finals. The clubs Near East and Olympia Larissa were relegated to the Greek A2 League. The top scorer of the league was Georgios Diamantopoulos, a player of Panionios. Fragiskos Alvertis, a player of Panathinaikos, was voted the MVP of the league.

== Teams ==
Location of teams in Greek Basket League 2002–03

Club	Home city
AEK Athens	Athens
Aris	Thessaloniki
Ionikos Nea Filadelfeia	Nea Filadelfeia, Athens
Irakleio	Irakleio
Iraklis	Thessaloniki
Makedonikos	Thessaloniki
Maroussi	Maroussi, Athens
Near East	Kaisariani, Athens
Olympia Larissa	Larissa
Olympiacos	Piraeus
Panathinaikos	Athens
Panionios	Nea Smyrni, Athens
PAOK	Thessaloniki
Peristeri	Peristeri, Athens

== Regular season ==
Pos	Team	Total							Home		Away	
		Pts	Pld	W	L	F	A	GD	W	L	W	L
1.	Panathinaikos	47	26	21	5	2117	1901	+216	13	0	8	5
2.	AEK Athens	46	26	20	6	2048	1826	+222	11	2	9	4
3.	Olympiacos	42	26	18	8	2168	2025	+143	10	3	8	5
4.	Peristeri	40	26	14	12	2014	1949	+65	10	3	4	9
5.	Aris	40	26	14	12	2105	2097	+8	10	3	4	9
6.	Maroussi	40	26	14	12	2002	2034	−32	10	3	4	9
7.	PAOK	39	26	13	13	2120	2104	+16	8	5	5	8
8.	Ionikos N.F.	38	26	12	14	2169	2188	−19	7	6	5	8
9.	Iraklis	38	26	12	14	2020	1972	+48	9	4	3	10
10.	Makedonikos	38	26	12	14	2139	2119	+20	8	5	4	9
11.	Panionios	36	26	10	16	2101	2203	−102	8	5	2	11
12.	Irakleio	35	26	9	17	2053	2237	−184	9	4	0	13
13.	Near East	34	26	8	18	2022	2188	−166	6	7	2	11
14.	Olympia Larissa	31	26	5	21	1979	2214	−235	5	8	0	13

Source: esake.gr, galanissportsdata.com

== Playoffs ==
Quarterfinals
1	Panathinaikos	2
8	Ionikos N.F.	0
4	Peristeri	2
5	Aris	1
2	AEK Athens	2
7	PAOK	0
3	Olympiacos	2
6	Maroussi	1

Semifinals
1	Panathinaikos	2
4	Peristeri	1
2	AEK Athens	2
3	Olympiacos	1

Finals
1	Panathinaikos	3
2	AEK Athens	1
Third place
3	Olympiacos	1
4	Peristeri	3

=== The finals ===
Panathinaikos	77–68	AEK Athens

AEK Athens	72–67	Panathinaikos

Panathinaikos	84–73	AEK Athens

AEK Athens	80–81	Panathinaikos

== Final standings ==
Pos	Team	Overall record		
		Pld	W	L
1.	Panathinaikos	35	28	7
2.	AEK Athens	35	25	10
3.	Peristeri	36	20	16
4.	Olympiacos	34	22	14
5.	Aris	29	15	14
6.	Maroussi	29	15	14
7.	PAOK	28	13	15
8.	Ionikos N.F.	28	12	16
9.	Iraklis	26	12	14
10.	Makedonikos	26	12	14
11.	Panionio	26	10	16
12.	Irakleio	26	9	17
13.	Near East	26	8	18
14.	Olympia Larissa	26	5	21

== Top Players ==
Category	Player	Team	Average
Points	Georgios Diamantopoulos	Panionios	26,7
Rebounds	Ben Handlogten	Makedonikos	12,9
Assists	Nikos Vetoulas	Ionikos Nea Filadelfeia	5,3
Steals	Dimitris Diamantidis	Iraklis	2,5
Blocks	Ryan Stack	Aris	1,6

== Clubs in international competitions ==
Team	Competition	Result
Olympiacos	EuroLeague	Top 16, 2nd place
Panathinaikos	EuroLeague	Top 16, 3rd place
AEK	EuroLeague	Regular season, 8th place
Aris	FIBA Europe Champions Cup	Final 4, 1st place
PAOK	FIBA Europe Champions Cup	Pan-European phase, Regular season, 4th place
Peristeri	FIBA Europe Champions Cup	Pan-European phase, Regular season, Originally qualified but eventually withdrew
Maroussi	FIBA Europe Champions Cup	Conference South, Regular season, 4th place
Panionios	FIBA Europe Champions Cup	Conference South, Regular season, 4th place
