= Sporting B.C. in international competitions =

Sporting B.C. in international competitions is the history and statistics of Sporting B.C. in FIBA Europe and Euroleague Basketball Company competitions.

== European competitions ==
Record	Round	Opponent club		
1979–80 FIBA Korać Cup 3rd–tier
1–1	1st round	(West Germany) Bayreuth	111–110 (h)	71–83 (a)
1980–81 FIBA Korać Cup 3rd–tier
0–2	2nd round	(Socialist Federal Republic of Yugoslavia) Crvena zvezda	63–85 (a)	69–72 (h)
1995–96 FIBA Korać Cup 3rd–tier
5–5 +2 draws	1st round	(Cyprus) AEK Larnaca	77–61 (h)	84–84 (a)
5–5 +2 draws	2nd round	(Belgium) Belgacom Union Mons-Hainaut	92–92 (a)	107–92 (h)
5–5 +2 draws	3rd round	(France) Pitch Cholet	95–76 (h)	71–80 (a)
5–5 +2 draws	Top 16	(Turkey) Fenerbahçe	106–90 (h)	78–98 (a)
5–5 +2 draws	Top 16	(Italy) Stefanel Milano	96–100 (h)	83–110 (a)
5–5 +2 draws	Top 16	(Spain) Estudiantes Argentaria	84–88 (h)	88–86 (a)
1996–97 FIBA Korać Cup 3rd–tier
8–2	1st round	Bye	Sporting qualified without games	
8–2	2nd round	(Sweden) Plannja	92–67 (a)	85–55 (h)
8–2	2nd round	(Slovakia) Baník Cígeľ Prievidza	74–63 (h)	76–66 (a)
8–2	2nd round	(Russia) CSK VVS Samara	80–79 (a)	88–64 (h)
8–2	3rd round	(Israel) Maccabi Rishon LeZion	61–62 (a)	79–76 (h)
8–2	Top 16	(Italy) Telemarket Roma	66–78 (a)	81–76 (h)
1997–98 FIBA Korać Cup 3rd–tier
2–4	1st round	Bye	Sporting qualified without games	
2–4	2nd round	(Turkey) Tuborg	89–87 (h)	50–79 (a)
2–4	2nd round	(Poland) Stal Bobrek Bytom	91–87 (h)	65–80 (a)
2–4	2nd round	(Bulgaria) Cherno More Port Varna	66–70 (a)	64–75 (h)

== European games ==
- FIBA Korać Cup, 31-10-1979: AO Sporting Athinai - BG Bayreuth 66-59 (32-22)

AO Sporting (coach: xxx): Dave Caligaris 22, Tom Kappos 4, Giorgos Skropolithas 8, Zakynthinos 18, Vasilopoulos 20, Kagidis 4.

- BG Bayreuth (coach: Stephen McMahon): Stephen McMahon 22, Michel 6, Gottfried Oliwa 8, Buzz Harnett 19, Georg Kämpf 4, Graf, Wagner, Martin.

== See also ==
- Greek basketball clubs in international competitions
