= Aristeidis Moumoglou =

Retired Greek basketball player

Personal information
- Born: 1942 (age 83–84) Veria, Greece
- Listed height: 6 ft 4 in (1.93 m)
- Listed weight: 215 lb (98 kg)

Career information
- College: Aristotle University of Thessaloniki (1967–1970)
- Playing career: 1960–1972
- Position: Shooting guard
- Number: 13

Career history
- 1960–1967: Iraklis
- 1967–1970: Aristotle University of Thessaloniki
- 1970–1972: Iraklis

Career highlights
- Greek League Top Scorer (1972)

Aristeidis Moumoglou (alternate spelling: Aristides; Greek: Aristeidis Moumoglou, Greek pronunciation: [ari'stiðis 'mumoɣlu]; born in 1942) is a retired Greek professional basketball player. Born in Veria, he played with Iraklis Thessaloniki in the Greek Basket League, and also represented the Greek national team at the senior level. He played at the shooting guard position.

== Professional career ==
Moumoglou spent his entire club basketball career with the Greek club Iraklis Thessaliniki. He first joined Iraklis' youth clubs in 1958, and he then joined the club's senior men's team in 1960. In 1967, he stopped playing men's senior club basketball, in order to earn degrees at the Aristotle University of Thessaloniki, where he also played with the university's basketball team. He returned to playing senior men's club basketball in 1970.

On July 13, 1972, Moumoglou set the record for most points scored in a single game in the Greek Basket League, with a total of 145 points scored against VAO, in a 172–94 win. Although it was an official game of the top-tier level Greek Basket League, VAO used its under-18 team during the game, rather than its regular senior men's team.

There is also some controversy as to whether the exact figure was 143 or 145 points scored, as Moumoglou's final basket of the game was scored after the game's final buzzer had sounded. However, the figure recorded by the game officials was 145 points. Strangely enough, that was also the last game of his basketball career, as he retired after it. He was the top scorer of the Greek Basket League's 1971–72 season, scoring a total of 654 points.

== National team career ==
Moumoglou played in five games with the senior Greek national basketball team, averaging 7.4 points per game.

== Personal life ==
Moumoglou, who was born in Veria, moved with his parents to Thessaloniki, in 1953. He received degrees in pharmacy and medicine from the Aristotle University of Thessaloniki.

== See also ==
- List of basketball players who have scored 100 points in a single game
- Players with the most points scored in a single game in the Amateur Greek Basketball Championship (1963–1992)
