= Vassilis Goumas =

Greek basketball player (1946–2026)

Personal information
- Born: 15 November 1946 Volos, Greece
- Died: 30 March 2026 (aged 79) Athens, Greece
- Listed height: 6 ft 6 in (1.98 m)
- Listed weight: 230 lb (104 kg)

Career information
- NBA draft: 1968: undrafted
- Playing career: 1961–1988
- Positions: Power forward, center
- Number: 5, 7, 12

Career history
- 1961–1962: Olympiacos Addis Ababa
- 1962–1963: Panellinios Athens
- 1963: Olympiacos Addis Ababa
- 1963–1964: Panellinios Athens
- 1964: Corinthians Greek Sporting Club Johannesburg
- 1964–1966: Olympiacos Addis Ababa
- 1966–1969: Panellinios Athens
- 1969–1970: Sporting Clube de Lourenço Marques
- 1970–1979: Panellinios Athens
- 1979–1985: AEK Athens
- 1985–1988: Ilysiakos Athens

Career highlights
- FIBA European Selection (1974); 4× Greek League Top Scorer (1970, 1974, 1975, 1977); Greek Cup winner (1981); Greek Cup Finals Top Scorer (1981); Greek 2nd Division champion (1986); African Club Cup Championship champion (1964); Mozambican League champion (1970); Mozambican League Top Scorer (1970); 6× Ethiopian Premier League champion (1961–1966)
Medals
Event	1st	2nd	3rd
Balkan Championship	0	2	0
Total	0	2	0
Men's basketball
Representing Greece
Balkan Championship
Silver medal – second place	1969 Yugoslavia	
Silver medal – second place	1972 Bulgaria	

Vassilis Goumas (alternate spellings: Vasilis, Vassilios, Vasillos, Gkoumas; Greek: Βασίλης Γκούμας; 15 November 1946 – 30 March 2026) was a Greek professional basketball player. During his playing career, he was nicknamed The Emperor. At the club level, Goumas was a member of the FIBA European Selection team in 1974. While at the national team level, he was the MVP of the 1973 FIBA EuroBasket Qualification Tournament, while representing the senior Greek national team. In June 1987, after Goumas had announced that the upcoming 1987–88 season would be the final season of his basketball playing career, he was honored by FIBA with a retirement farewell celebration FIBA Europe All-Star Game.

== Early life and career ==
Goumas began playing youth system basketball in Volos, Greece, with the youth clubs of Olympiacos Volos.

== Professional career ==
In 1961, at the age of 15, Goumas began playing at the senior men's club level, with the Ethiopian Premier League club Olympiacos Addis Ababa. In 1962, he joined Panellinios Athens, of the top-tier level Greek League. From 1962 to 1964, he played with both Olympiacos Addis Ababa in Ethiopia, and with Panellinios in Greece.

After that, he played in South Africa, where he played with the Corinthians Greek Sporting Club Johannesburg. Goumas then played in Ethiopia again, with Olympiacos Addis Ababa, from 1964 to 1966. With Olympiacos Addis Ababa, he won the African Club Cup Championship title in 1964, and six Ethiopian Premier League championships, in the years 1961, 1962, 1963, 1964, 1965, and 1966. Goumas then returned to the Greek club Panellinios, in 1966.

In 1969, Goumas moved from Panellinios, to the Mozambican club Sporting Clube de Lourenço Marques (SCLM). With SCLM, he won the Mozambican League championship in 1970, while also being the Mozambican League's Top Scorer in the same year, with a scoring average of 35 points per game. After that, Goumas once again returned to Greece and Panellinios, where he stayed from 1970 to 1979. During that time, he was the long-time star of the Greek club. In the 1970–71 season, in a Greek League game against Amyntas Athens, Goumas scored 61 points. Goumas was a member of the FIBA European Selection team, in the year 1974.

Following that, Goumas moved to the Greek club AEK Athens, in 1979. With AEK, he was the Greek Cup Finals Top Scorer in 1981. On 9 December 1983, while playing with AEK Athens, in a Greek League game against VAO Thessaloniki, Goumas became the first player to ever reach 10,000 career points scored in the top-tier level Greek League. In 1985, Goumas moved to the Greek club Ilysiakos Athens. With Ilysiakos, he won the Greek 2nd Division championship in 1986. On 19 June 1987, before the last season of his playing career, FIBA Europe organized a FIBA All-Star Game, that was played in honor of Goumas' playing career. After that, Goumas played one more season with Ilysiakos, the 1987–88 season, and then he retired from playing pro club basketball, at the age of 41.

When he retired in 1988, Goumas was the Greek Basketball League's all-time top scorer. His career scoring record was eventually broken by Nikos Galis, on 29 February 1992. Goumas ultimately ended up as the unofficial second all-time top scorer, in the history of the Greek League's amateur era, which lasted from the 1963–64 season to the 1991–92 season, with 11,030 career points scored. The league's amateur era stats are unofficial, because only the stats since the league turned fully professional (1992–93 season to present), are officially recognized. Goumas is second only on the career scoring list to the legendary Galis, who scored a total of 12,714 points.

In his pro club career, Goumas took part in a total of 412 games in the top-tier level Greek League, while playing with Panellinios Athens, AEK Athens, and Ilysiakos Athens. His career scoring average in the Greek League was 26.8 points per game. Goumas was the Greek League Top Scorer four times during his career, in the 1969–70, 1973–74, 1974–75, and 1976–77 seasons.

== National team career ==
Goumas played with the Greek Under-17 junior national team at the 1963 Balkan Youth Basketball Championship, where he averaged 13.5 points per game. He also had a total of 114 caps with the senior men's Greek national team, in which he scored a total of 1,641 points, for a scoring average of 14.4 points per game. His personal best scoring game with Greece's senior national team was 41 points, which he scored against the German national team, in 1971.

With Greece, Goumas played at the following major FIBA tournaments: the 1967 FIBA EuroBasket, the 1968 FIBA European Olympic Qualifying Tournament, the 1969 FIBA EuroBasket, the 1972 FIBA Pre-Olympic Tournament, the 1973 FIBA EuroBasket, and the 1975 FIBA EuroBasket. He was also the MVP of the 1973 FIBA EuroBasket Qualification Tournament, where he averaged 16.7 points per game.

Goumas also represented Greece at the: 1969 Balkan Championship, where he won a silver medal, the 1971 Balkan Championship, the 1972 Balkan Championship, where he also won a silver medal, the 1973 Balkan Championship, the 1974 European Nations Cup, and the 1974 Balkan Championship.

=== "The Serenade on the Danube" ===
Goumas' last appearance with the senior men's Greek national team came on 16 June 1975, in Greece's 74–64 loss to Turkey, at the 1975 FIBA EuroBasket. At that 1975 EuroBasket, which took place in Belgrade, Yugoslavia, the famous "The Serenade on the Danube" incident occurred. The Hellenic Basketball Federation had given the Greek national team's caretaker, Panos Metaxas, some bottles of ouzo, brandy, cognac, nuts, and miniature tcholiadaki, that were supposed to then be given as gifts to FIBA's head officials and refs. However, Goumas, and his fellow Greek national teammates Apostolos Kontos and Aris Roftopoulos, were upset with how the Greek federation and Greek national team were being run at the time, and also with how FIBA's refs were calling Greece's games, and in a sign of protest, they took the gifts and then threw them off of the roof of the Hotel Jugoslavija, that the Greek national team mission was staying in, and into the Danube river. As a result, all three of the Greek players were given lifetime bans from the Greek national team. However, the lifetime bans were later reduced to a period of three years.

== Death ==
Goumas died in Athens on 30 March 2026, aged 79.

== Awards and accomplishments ==
=== Club career ===
- 6× Ethiopian Premier League Champion: (1961–1966)
- African Club Cup Championship Champion: (1964)
- Mozambican League Champion: (1970)
- Mozambican League Top Scorer: (1970)
- 4× Greek League Top Scorer: (1970, 1974, 1975, 1977)
- FIBA European Selection: (1974)
- Greek Cup Winner: (1981)
- Greek Cup Finals Top Scorer: (1981)
- Greek 2nd Division Champion: (1986)
- Honored by FIBA with a retirement farewell celebration FIBA Europe All-Star Game: (1987)

=== Greek senior national team ===
- 1969 Balkan Championship: Silver
- 1972 Balkan Championship: Silver
- 1973 FIBA EuroBasket Qualification Tournament: MVP

== See also ==
- Players with the most points scored in the Amateur Greek Basketball Championship (1963–1992)
- Players with the most points scored in a single game in the Amateur Greek Basketball Championship (1963–1992)
