= Paraschos Tsantalis =

Greek basketball player and coach

Career information
- Playing career: 1963–1975
- Position: Small forward

Career history
- 1963–1975: Panellinios
- 1975–1976: Olympiacos
- 1977–1978: Panellinios

Career highlights
- Greek League champion (1976); Greek Cup winner (1976); Greek League Top Scorer (1971)

Paraskevas "Paraschos" Tsantalis (alternate spellings: Chandalis, Chantalis) (Greek: Παρασκευάς "Παράσχος" Τσάνταλης) is a Greek former professional basketball player and coach. He played with Panellinios and Olympiacos in the Greek Basket League, and also represented the Greek national team at the senior level. He played at the small forward position.

== Professional career ==
Tsantalis played club basketball in the Greek Basketball League with Panellinios Athens, from 1963 to 1975. He was the Greek Basketball League's top scorer in the 1970–71 season. On 28 March 1971, he scored 73 points in a single Greek League game, between Panellinios and Panionios Athens. That is the second most points ever scored in a single game of the top-tier level Greek League. In 1976, while playing with Olympiacos Piraeus, Tsantalis won both the Greek League championship and the Greek Cup title.

== National team career ==
Tsantalis played in five games with the senior Greek national basketball team.

== Coaching career ==
After he retired from playing club basketball, Tsantalis became a basketball coach.

== See also ==
- Players with the most points scored in a single game in the Amateur Greek Basketball Championship (1963–1992)
