= Ioannis Sioutis =

Greek basketball player

Ioannis Sioutis (alternate spelling: Giannis) (Greek: Γιάννης Σιούτης; born July 27, 1973) is a Greek retired professional basketball player and current assistant coach, most recently for AEK Athens of the Greek Basket League, under head coach Ilias Kantzouris. He has also previously worked as an assistant for Panathinaikos. At a height of 1.84 m (6 ft ½ in), he played at the point guard position during his active basketball career.

== Professional career ==
Sioutis started his playing career with the youth team of Milon in 1986. In 1995, he transferred to Aris. In 1997, he won the Korać Cup, and in 1998, he won the Greek Cup, both while playing with Aris. In 1999, he played with Panionios and in 2000, he returned to Aris. In 2002, he won the EuroLeague 2001–02 championship while playing with Panathinaikos.

He also played with Irakleio, Peristeri, Ilysiakos, Dafni, and ICBS. In 2007, Sioutis won the Greek 2nd Division with Sporting, and he then transferred to AEK Athens.

== National team career ==
Sioutis also played in 11 games with the Greek national basketball team.
