= Apostolos Kontos =

Greek basketball player and coach

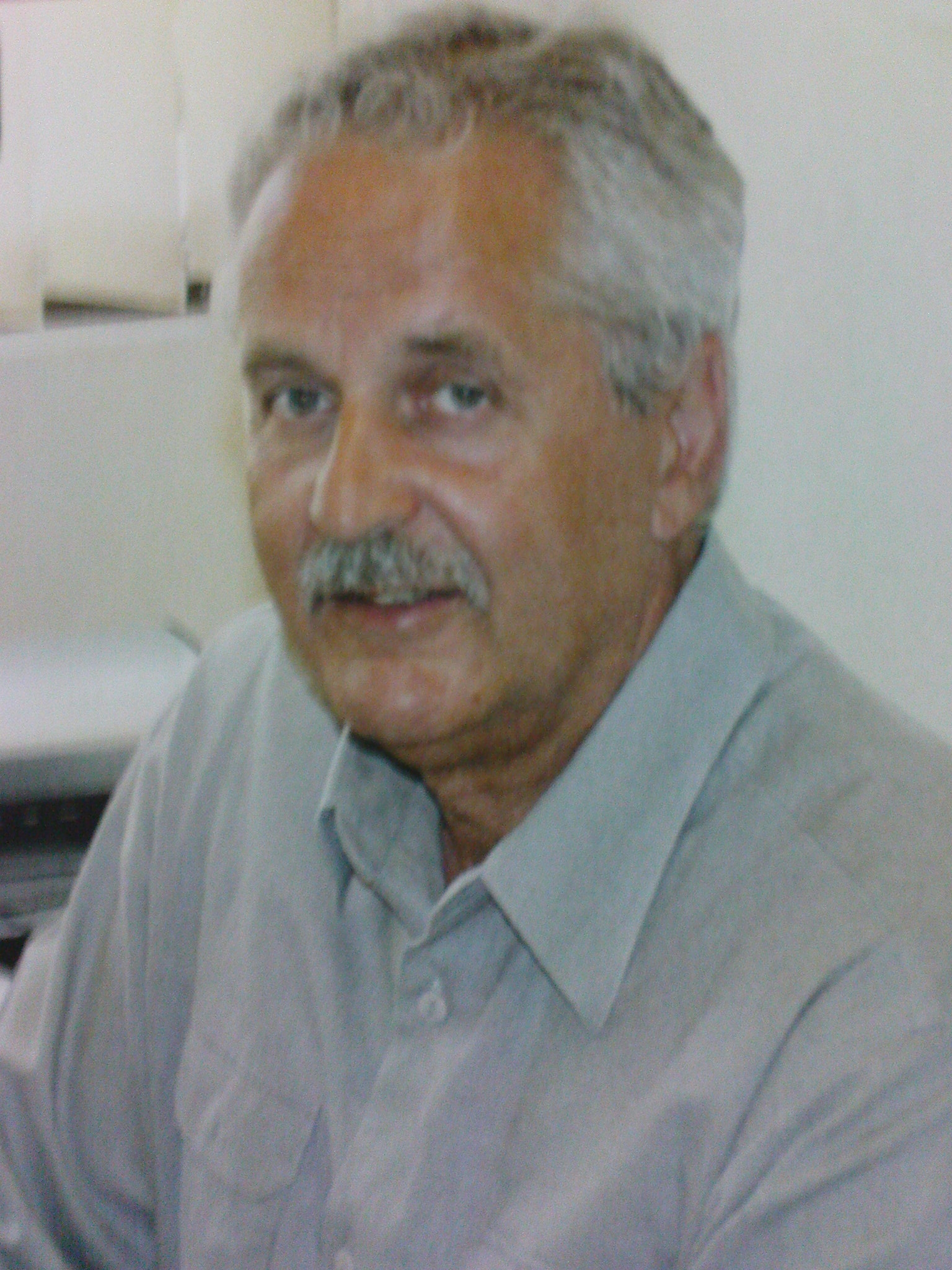
- Kontos, in 2009.

Personal information
- Born: November 22, 1947 (age 78) Greece
- Listed height: 6 ft 4.5 in (1.94 m)
- Listed weight: 210 lb (95 kg)

Career information
- NBA draft: 1969: undrafted
- Playing career: 1962–1987
- Position: Shooting guard / small forward
- Number: 4

Career history
- 1962–1969: Ionikos NF
- 1969–1983: Panathinaikos
- 1983–1987: AEK Athens

Career highlights
- As a player: 9× Greek League champion (1971–1975, 1977, 1980–1982); 3× Greek Cup winner (1979, 1982, 1983)
Medals
Men's Basketball
Representing Greece
Mediterranean Games
Bronze medal – third place	1971 Turkey
FIBA Under-18 EuroBasket
Silver medal – second place	1970 Greece	Under-18

Apostolos Kontos (Greek: Απόστολος Κόντος) (born on November 22, 1947) is a Greek former professional basketball player and coach. He is considered to be one of the greatest players in Panathinaikos Athens history, and is the club's all-time leading scorer. He was also a long-time member of the Greek national team. He played at the shooting guard and small forward positions, with small forward being his main position.

== Professional career ==
Kontos began his club playing career with the Greek club Ionikos NF, in 1962. In 1969, he moved to the Greek club Panathinaikos Athens, on a 500,000 drachmas transfer fee. With Panathinaikos, he won 9 Greek League championships (1971, 1972, 1973, 1974, 1975, 1977, 1980, 1981, 1982) and 3 Greek Cups (1979, 1982, 1983). He finished his playing career with AEK Athens.

In the top-tier level amateur Greek Championship (1963–1992), he scored a total of 8,712 points, which was the 4th most total points scored in the competition.

== National team career ==
As a member of the Greek Under-18 junior national team, Kontos won the silver medal at the 1970 FIBA Under-18 EuroBasket.

Kontos also had 114 caps with the senior men's Greek national team, in which he scored a total of 1,114 points. He won a bronze medal with Greece, at the 1971 Mediterranean Games. He also played with Greece at the 1972 FIBA Pre-Olympic Tournament, the 1973 FIBA EuroBasket, and the 1975 FIBA EuroBasket.

=== "The Serenade on the Danube" ===
At the 1975 FIBA EuroBasket, which took place in Belgrade, Yugoslavia, the famous "The Serenade on the Danube" incident occurred. The Hellenic Basketball Federation had given the Greek national team's caretaker, Panos Metaxas, some bottles of ouzo, brandy, cognac, nuts, and miniature tcholiadaki, that were supposed to then be given as gifts to FIBA's head officials and refs. However, Kontos, and his fellow Greek national teammates Vassilis Goumas and Aris Roftopoulos, were upset with how the Greek federation and Greek national team were being run at the time, and also with how FIBA's refs were calling Greece's games, and in a sign of protest, they took the gifts and then threw them off of the roof of the Hotel Jugoslavija, that the Greek national team mission was staying in, and into the Danube river. As a result, all three of the Greek players were given lifetime bans from the Greek national team. However, the lifetime bans were later reduced to a period of three years.

== Coaching career ==
After his playing career ended, Kontos became a basketball coach. He worked as the head coach of the Greek clubs Triton, Esperos Kallitheas, Milon, Ionikos NF, Pagrati, and Dafni. He was also the head coach of the Greek club AEK Athens, during the 1993–94 season.

== Awards and accomplishments ==
=== Pro clubs ===
- 2× EuroLeague Semifinalist: (1972, 1982)
- 9× Greek League Champion: (1971, 1972, 1973, 1974, 1975, 1977, 1980, 1981, 1982)
- 3× Greek Cup Winner: (1979, 1982, 1983)
- Panathinaikos Basketball Club's All-Time Top Scorer
- Panathinaikos Athletic Club's 100 Years, 100 Greatest Sports Personalities (#17 athlete and #3 basketball player): (2008)
- Panathinaikos Basketball Club's 100 Years, Greatest Players: (2019)
- The indoor basketball arena of Nea Filadelfeia, Greece, was renamed to "Apostolos Kontos Indoor Sports Hall", in his honor, on Wednesday July 22, 2020.

=== Greek junior national team ===
- 1970 FIBA Under-18 EuroBasket: Silver

=== Greek senior national team ===
- 1971 Mediterranean Games: Bronze

== See also ==
- Players with the most points scored in the Amateur Greek Basketball Championship (1963–1992)
