= Dimitris Fosses =

Greek basketball player and coach

Personal information
- Born: November 14, 1952 (age 74) Greece
- Listed height: 6 ft 6.75 in (2.00 m)
- Listed weight: 220 lb (100 kg)

Career information
- NBA draft: 1974: undrafted
- Playing career: 1968–1992
- Position: Power forward / center
- Number: 12

Career history
- 1968–1981: Maroussi
- 1981–1988: Panionios
- 1988–1991: Dafni
- 1991–1992: Near East

Dimitris Fosses (Greek: Δημήτρης Φωσσές; born November 14, 1952, in Greece) is a Greek retired professional basketball player and coach. At 6'6 3/4" (2.00 m) in height, he played at the power forward and center positions.

== Professional career ==
In the top-tier level amateur Greek Championship (1963–1992), Fosses played in 408 games, and scored a total of 6,809 points, which was the 7th most total points scored in the competition.

== National team career ==
Fosses played in 55 games with the senior men's Greek national basketball team. With Greece, he played at the 1972 European Olympic Qualification tournament, and at EuroBasket 1975.

== Coaching career ==
After he retired from playing professional basketball, Fosses worked as a basketball coach.

== See also ==
- Players with the most points scored in the Amateur Greek Basketball Championship (1963–1992)
