= Charis Papageorgiou =

Greek basketball player (born 1953)

Charis Papageorgiou Χάρης Παπαγεωργίου
Personal information
- Born: March 26, 1953 (age 73) Thessaloniki, Greece
- Listed height: 6 ft 4.75 in (1.95 m)
- Listed weight: 210 lb (95 kg)

Career information
- Playing career: 1971–1988
- Position: Small forward

Career history
- 1971–1983: Aris
- 1983–1985: Faiakes Corfu
- 1985–1987: Aris
- 1987–1988: Ilysiakos

Career highlights
- 4× Greek League champion (1979, 1983, 1986, 1987); Greek Cup winner (1987); 2× Greek League Top Scorer (1976, 1979)

Charilaos "Charis" Papageorgiou (alternate spellings: Harilaos, Haris) (Greek: Χαρίλαος "Χάρης" Παπαγεωργίου; born March 26, 1953, in Thessaloniki, Greece) is a Greek retired professional basketball player and current basketball executive. At a height of 1.95m (6 ft. 4 3/4 in.), he played at the small forward position.

== Professional career ==
After playing with the youth system clubs of Anagennisi, from 1965 to 1971, Papageorgiou began his senior club career with the Greek League club Aris in 1971. Papageorgiou was the Greek League Top Scorer, in the 1975–76 and 1978–79 seasons. During the 1978–79 Greek League season, he scored 60 points in a single game.

Unfortunately, at the age of 26, and at the peak of his career, Papageorgiou suffered a partial rupture of his Achilles tendon, at the end of the 1978–79 season. As a result, he was sidelined from playing basketball for three years. After that injury, he was never the same player, and he was unable to regain his place as one of the best players in Greece.

In 1983, Papageorgiou moved to Faiakes Corfu. He then returned to Aris in 1985, before joining Ilysiakos in 1987.

== National team career ==
Papageorgiou was a member of the senior men's Greek national team. With Greece's senior national team, he had a total of 82 caps, and scored a total of 886 points, for a scoring average of 10.8 points per game. With Greece, he played at the 1973 FIBA EuroBasket, the 1979 FIBA EuroBasket, and the 1981 FIBA EuroBasket.

== Post-playing career ==
After his playing career, Papageorgiou worked as the President of Aris Thessaloniki club and was involved in transfers in the Greek and foreign markets. 2018- June 2025 had worked of Aris

== Awards and accomplishments ==
=== Playing career ===
- 2× Greek League Top Scorer: (1976, 1979)
- 4× Greek League Champion: (1979, 1983, 1986, 1987)
- Greek Cup Winner: (1987)

== See also ==
- Players with the most points scored in a single game in the Amateur Greek Basketball Championship (1963–1992)
