= Sayed Tewfik El-Sayed =

Egyptian basketball player

Personal information
- Nationality: Egyptian
- Born: 30 August 1942 (age 82)

Sport
- Sport: Basketball

Sayed Tewfik El-Sayed (born 30 August 1942) is an Egyptian basketball player. He competed in the men's tournament at the 1972 Summer Olympics.
