= El-Sayed Abdel Hamid Mobarak =

Egyptian basketball player (born 1947)

Personal information
- Nationality: Egyptian
- Born: 17 April 1947 (age 78)
- Height: 1.40 m (4 ft 7 in)
- Weight: 85 kg (187 lb)

Sport
- Sport: Basketball

El-Sayed Abdel Hamid Mobarak (born 17 April 1947) is an Egyptian basketball player. He competed in the 1972 Summer Olympics.
