= Kirk King =

American basketball player (born 1975)

Personal information
- Born: December 24, 1975 (age 50) Baton Rouge, Louisiana, U.S.
- Listed height: 6 ft 8 in (2.03 m)
- Listed weight: 240 lb (109 kg)

Career information
- High school: Southern Lab (Baton Rouge, Louisiana)
- College: UConn (1993–1997)
- NBA draft: 1997: undrafted
- Playing career: 1997–2005
- Position: Small forward

Career history
- 1997–1998: Connecticut Pride
- 1997: Connecticut Skyhawks
- 1998: Guaiqueríes de Margarita
- 1998: Connecticut Skyhawks
- 1998: Sta. Lucia Realtors
- 1998: La Crosse Bobcats
- 1998–1999: Rockford Lightning
- 1999: Aibonito
- 1999–2000: Trenton Shooting Stars
- 2000: San Diego Stingrays
- 2000: Alaska Milkmen
- 2000–2001: Connecticut Pride
- 2001: Baltimore Bayrunners
- 2001: Toros de Aragua
- 2001: Piratas de Quebradillas
- 2001–2002: Near East B.C.
- 2005: Gaiteros del Zulia

Career highlights
- CBA rebounding leader (2001); Greek Basket League rebounding leader (2002)

Kirkland Maurice King (born December 24, 1975) is a retired professional basketball player. He played for the Connecticut Huskies from 1993 to 1997 before being suspended during his senior season for violating National Collegiate Athletic Association (NCAA) rules. In 1997, he was drafted into the Continental Basketball Association (CBA), the now-defunct developmental league of the National Basketball Association (NBA). While never reaching the NBA, King played professionally for several years in the CBA, the United States Basketball League, the International Basketball League, the Philippines, Greece, Puerto Rico and Venezuela.

== Early life and amateur career ==
Born in Baton Rouge, Louisiana, King attended Southern Lab High School. He led the school's basketball team to two state championships during his junior and senior seasons. He played for the People to People Student Ambassador Program basketball team which traveled to the Dominican Republic in 1994, Italy in 1995 and Spain in 1996.

King opted to attend the University of Connecticut instead of a Louisiana university following a visit to Connecticut and a tour of the campus. After averaging 2.9 points per game in his first two seasons as a reserve player with the Connecticut Huskies, King was given the starting small forward spot going into his junior season (1995–96).

On January 10, 1996, King set a career high in points with 20 on 10-of-10 shooting from the field, tying a Big East Conference record for number of field goals made in a game without a miss. In January 1996, King made 22 straight field goals, three shy on the National Collegiate Athletic Association (NCAA) record of 25-for-25.

Going into the 1996–97 season, King was the only player on UConn's roster that had experience as a starter and was named the team's captain. In January 1997, the NCAA announced that King and UConn sophomore Ricky Moore had been suspended for accepting free airline tickets from agent John Lounsbury to fly back to Connecticut in October 1995. King's suspension was for the remainder of his senior season. The NCAA gave King a longer suspension than Moore because according to their investigation King knew he was violating NCAA rules. UConn was later stripped of their wins during their 1996 NCAA Division I men's basketball tournament run and ordered them to pay back $90,970 in money the school made during the postseason. The team made King an undergraduate assistant coach following his suspension, allowing him to attend practices, travel with the team and sit on their bench during games.

Huskies head coach Jim Calhoun told the Hartford Courant, "Kirk King made a mistake; nothing more, nothing less. I think he should be able to play, but I don't run the NCAA. What Kirk said to us was more than compelling to me. Apparently, it wasn't for other people. I can't control that." King graduated from Connecticut with a bachelor's degree in sociology.

== Professional career ==
Following his graduation in 1997, King was drafted in the fifth round (46^{th} overall) by the Connecticut Pride in the Continental Basketball Association (CBA). During his rookie season in the CBA, King averaged 10.9 points per game and 4.5 rebounds. He was named the CBA's American Conference Player of the Week on January 3, 1998. King had brief stints playing for the Connecticut Skyhawks in the United States Basketball League (USBL) in 1997 and 1998. King played for the Guaiqueríes de Margarita of the Liga Profesional de Baloncesto in Venezuela in 1998. During the off-season before the 1998–99 season, King worked out with the New York Knicks of the National Basketball Association (NBA), but was cut from the team before the preseason.

King signed with the La Crosse Bobcats of the CBA in 1998, but was later traded to the Rockford Lightning. In 1999, King played briefly with a professional team based in Aibonito, Puerto Rico. Going into the 1999–2000 season, King signed with the Trenton Shooting Stars of the International Basketball League (IBL). King signed with the San Diego Stingrays of the IBL in January 2000.

In the summer of 2000, King played professional basketball in the Philippines. King re-joined the Connecticut Pride in the CBA before the league ceased operations and filed for bankruptcy in February 2001. He was named to the CBA All-Star game during the 2000–01 season. He also played with the Baltimore Bayrunners in the IBL during the 2000–01 season. Following the IBL season, King signed with the Toros de Aragua of the Liga Profesional de Baloncesto in Venezuela. Later that year, King joined the Piratas de Quebradillas in the Baloncesto Superior Nacional, Puerto Rico's top-tier men's professional basketball league.

In 2001, King signed with A.O. Near East B.C. in the Greek Basket League in Greece. During the 2001–02 season, King averaged 14.2 points per game and 10 rebounds in 26 games played. He led the Greek Basket League in total rebounds (259). King last played for Gaiteros del Zulia in the Venezuelan Liga Profesional de Baloncesto in 2005 before a knee injury forced him to retire.
