= Andrés Guibert =

Cuban basketball player

Personal information
- Born: October 28, 1968 (age 58) Havana, Cuba
- Listed height: 6 ft 10 in (2.08 m)
- Listed weight: 260 lb (118 kg)

Career information
- College: Cantera Instituto Manuel Fajardo
- NBA draft: 1990: undrafted
- Playing career: 1994–2004
- Position: Power forward / center

Career history
- 1994: Minnesota Timberwolves
- 1994: Capitalinos de San Juan
- 1994–1995: Minnesota Timberwolves
- 1995: Capitalinos de San Juan
- 1995–1996: Ourense
- 1996: Criollos de Caguas
- 1996–1997: Sporting
- 1997: Criollos de Caguas
- 1997–1998: Pesaro
- 1998–1999: Apollon Patras
- 1999–2000: Near East
- 2001: Irakleio
- 2001: Basket Treviso
- 2001: Indios de Mayagüez
- 2001–2002: KAOD
- 2002: Indios de Mayagüez
- 2003: Valladolid
- 2003: Toritos de Cayey
- 2004: Leones de Ponce

Career highlights
- 3× Greek League All-Star (1996 II, 1999, 2002)
- Stats at NBA.com
- Stats at Basketball Reference

Andrés Guibert Sargenton (born October 28, 1968), commonly known as Andrés Guibert, is a Cuban-Puerto Rican former professional basketball player. In 1993, Guibert defected to Puerto Rico, from the Cuban delegation at the 1993 Central American and Caribbean Games, that was held in Ponce.

== Professional career ==
Guibert played in the National Basketball Association (NBA) for the Minnesota Timberwolves (1993–94 and 1994–95 seasons). In 22 NBA games, he averaged 2.7 points per game, and 2.8 rebounds per game, in 9.1 minutes per game. He was selected by the Toronto Raptors in the 1995 NBA expansion draft, but was waived before the 1995–96 regular season started.

After that, he played in Greece's top-tier Greek Basket League, for Sporting (1996–97), Apollon Patras (1998–99), Near East Kaisariani (1999–00), Heraklion Crete (2000–01) and KAOD (2001–02).

He also played in Italy's top-tier Lega Basket Serie A for Scavolini Pesaro (1997–98) and Benetton Treviso (2000–01), and in Puerto Rico's top-tier Baloncesto Superior Nacional, for Ponce Lions (2003–04).

== National team career ==
Guibert was a member of the senior Cuban national team. With Cuba he played at the 1989 FIBA AmeriCup, the 1992 FIBA AmeriCup, and the 1993 FIBA AmeriCup.
