= Dave Caligaris =

American basketball player

David Caligaris
Personal information
- Born: 1956 (age 69–70) Holliston, Massachusetts, U.S.
- Listed height: 6 ft 4 in (1.93 m)
- Listed weight: 200 lb (91 kg)

Career information
- College: Northeastern (1974–1978)
- NBA draft: 1978: 5th round, 95th overall pick
- Drafted by: Detroit Pistons
- Playing career: 1978–1981
- Position: Guard

Career history
- 1978–1981: Sporting
- Stats at Basketball Reference

David S. Caligaris (born 1956) is an American former professional basketball player. He played college basketball with Northeastern University.

He was selected by the Detroit Pistons in the 5th round of the 1978 NBA draft, 95th overall.

He played from 1978 to 1981 for Sporting Basketball Club in Greece. He is considered to be one of the greatest players in Sporting's history. He was the third scorer for the Greek championship in the 1978–79 period scoring 649 points and the second scorer in 1979–80 period scoring 727 points.
