= Anatoly Zourpenko =

Greek-Russian basketball player (1975–2022)

Personal information
- Born: 5 November 1975 Volgograd, Russian SFSR, Soviet Union
- Died: 24 October 2022 (aged 46)
- Listed height: 6 ft 11.5 in (2.12 m)
- Listed weight: 240 lb (109 kg)

Career information
- Playing career: 1993–2009
- Positions: Power forward, center

Career history
- 1993–1994: Proteas Athens
- 1994–1995: Sporting
- 1995–1998: Olympiacos
- 1998–1999: Papagou
- 1999–2000: Maroussi
- 2000–2002: Near East
- 2002–2003: Panellinios
- 2003–2005: Sporting
- 2006–2007: Ilysiakos
- 2007–2009: Volzhanin-GES Volzhskiy

Career highlights
- EuroLeague champion (1997); 2× Greek League champion (1996, 1997); Greek Cup winner (1997); 2× Greek League All-Star (1998, 2001)

Anatoly Zourpenko (alternate spellings: Anatoli, Zourmpenko, Zhurbenko; 5 November 1975 – 24 October 2022) was a Greek-Russian professional basketball player. He was 2.12 m (6' 11 1/2") tall and played at the power forward and center positions.

== Early life ==
Zourpenko was born on 5 November 1975, in Volgograd, Russian SFSR, Soviet Union. He grew up in Greece, after having moved there as a young child.

== Professional career ==
Zourpenko played with the Greek club Olympiacos Piraeus, from 1995 to 1998. With Olympiacos, he won the coveted Triple Crown title, by winning the Greek League championship, the Greek Cup title, and the EuroLeague championship, all in the same year, in 1997. He also played at the 1997 McDonald's Championship Final, against the NBA's Chicago Bulls.

During his club career, Zourpenko also played with the Greek clubs Papagou, Maroussi, Near East, Panellinios, and Ilysiakos.

== Personal life and death ==
Zourpenko died on 24 October 2022 at the age of 47.
