= Pavlos Stamelos =

Greek basketball player and coach

Personal information
- Born: August 2, 1950 (age 76) Greece
- Listed height: 6 ft 4 in (1.93 m)
- Listed weight: 220 lb (100 kg)

Career information
- NBA draft: 1972: undrafted
- Playing career: 1968–1985
- Position: Power forward / center
- Number: 7, 4

Career history
- 1968–1979: Sporting
- 1979–1981: AEK Athens
- 1981–1985: Sporting

Career highlights
- As a player: Greek League Top Scorer (1978)
Medals
Men's Basketball
Representing Greece
Mediterranean Games
Bronze medal – third place	1971 Turkey
European U-18 Championship
Silver medal – second place	1970 Greece	Under-18

Pavlos Stamelos (Greek: Παύλος Σταμέλος; born August 2, 1950, in Greece) is a Greek retired professional basketball player and coach. At 6'4" (1.93 m) in height, he played at the power forward and center positions.

== Professional career ==
Stamelos started his club playing career with the junior teams of Sporting Athens in 1964. With Sporting, he was the Greek League Top Scorer in the 1977–78 season. He moved to AEK Athens for the 1979–80 season, where he played until 1981.

In the top-tier level amateur Greek Championship (1963–1992), he played in 361 games, and scored a total of 6,645 points, which was the 8th most total points scored in the competition.

== National team career ==
Stamelos played in 53 games with the senior men's Greek national team. With Greece, he played at the 1972 FIBA European Olympic Qualification tournament, and at the 1973 FIBA EuroBasket.

== Coaching career ==
After he retired from playing professional basketball, Stamelos worked as a basketball coach, and he coached the junior teams of Sporting.

== Awards and accomplishments ==
- Greek League Top Scorer: (1978)

== See also ==
- Players with the most points scored in the Amateur Greek Basketball Championship (1963–1992)
