= Sporting B.C. =

A.O. Sporting Α.Ο. Σπόρτιγκ
- Leagues: Greek A2 League; Greek Cup
- Founded: 1924 (Istanbul); 1936 (Athens)
- History: Sporting Club Istanbul; 1924 – 1936; Sporting Club Athens; 1936 – Present
- Arena: Sporting Sports Arena
- Capacity: 2,500
- Location: Ano Patissia, Athens, Greece
- Team colors: Red and Blue
- President: Vassilis Sakopoulos
- Head coach: Alexis Papadatos
- Championships: A2 Championships: (3) (1988, 1991, 2007)
- Website: sportingbc.gr
Home	Away

Sporting B.C. (Greek: ΚΑΕ Σπόρτιγκ) is a Greek professional basketball team that is located at Ano Patissia, Athens, Greece, at the area of Elia Zervou 89 and Sarantaporoy. The club's full name is A.O. Sporting Athens B.C. (Greek: Α.Ο. Σπόρτιγκ Αθήνα KAE).

== History ==
The A.O. Sporting parent athletic association was founded in 1936, after a group of Greeks moved the Sporting Istanbul (Constantinople) club that had been founded in 1924, to Athens. Sporting began with sports departments in basketball and volleyball, and later added the sports of boxing, swimming, and ping pong. Today, the A.O. Sporting athletic club has only the basketball department, A.O. Sporting B.C.

Over the years, some of the players from Sporting B.C. played for the senior men's Greek National Basketball Team. The team competed in the FIBA Korać Cup competition in the 1979–80, 1980–81, 1995–96, and 1996–97 seasons. Sporting won the Greek Second Division championship three times, in 1988, 1991 and 2007.

== Arena ==
Sporting Sports Arena.

Sporting B.C. plays its home games at the 2,500 seat Sporting Sports Arena.

== Titles and honors ==
National:

- Greek 2nd Division: (3)
  - 1988, 1991, 2007

== Notable players ==
Note: Flags indicate national team eligibility at FIBA-sanctioned events. Players may hold other non-FIBA nationalities not displayed.

Criteria

To appear in this section a player must have either:

- Set a club record or won an individual award while at the club
- Played at least one official international match for their national team at any time
- Played at least one official NBA match at any time.

Greece:

- Dinos Angelidis
- Georgios Barlas
- - Dave Caligaris
- Christos Christodoulou
- Kostas Diamantopoulos
- Vangelis Karampoulas
- Fotis Katsikaris
- Georgios Kolokithas
- Nikos Liakopoulos
- Georgios Limniatis
- Faidon Matthaiou
- Dimitris Papanikolaou
- Kostas Petropoulos
- Ioannis Sioutis
- Pavlos Stamelos
- Vassilis Symtsak
- Nick Tsiotos

Europe:

- - Nikola Radulović

USA:

- Mitchell Wiggins
- Alphonso Ford
- Derrick Hamilton
- Tony Costner
- Tony Dumas
- John Hudson
- Brian Vaughns
- Malcolm Mackey
- Donald Williams

Rest of Americas:

- Andrés Guibert

== Head coaches ==
- Kostas Diamantopoulos
- Steve Giatzoglou
- Vassilis Fragkias
- Kostas Petropoulos
- Aris Lykogiannis
- Angelos Koronios

== See also ==
- Sporting Athens women's basketball
