= Nikos Vetoulas =

Greek basketball player and coach

Nikos Vetoulas Νίκος Βετούλας
Xinjiang Flying Tigers
- Title: assistant coach
- League: CBA

Personal information
- Born: February 6, 1974 (age 52) Patras, Greece
- Listed height: 6 ft 4 in (1.93 m)
- Listed weight: 216 lb (98 kg)

Career information
- NBA draft: 1996: undrafted
- Playing career: 1994–2008
- Position: Point guard
- Coaching career: 2008–present

Career history

Playing
- 1994–1999: Apollon Patras
- 1999–2000: PAOK
- 2000–2002: Near East
- 2002–2003: Ionikos N.F.
- 2003–2004: Aris
- 2004–2006: Udine
- 2006–2007: AEK Athens
- 2007: Murcia
- 2007–2008: Udine

Coaching
- 2008–2009: Aris (assistant)
- 2010–2015: Apollon Patras
- 2016: SAM Basket Massagno
- 2016: Promitheas Patras
- 2017–2018: Rethymno Cretan Kings
- 2018: Kolossos Rodou
- 2018–2019: Ionikos Nikaias
- 2019: Ionikos Nikaias
- 2020–2023: Apollon Patras
- 2024: Maroussi
- 2025: Aris
- 2026–present: Xinjiang Flying Tigers

Career highlights
- As a player: Greek Cup winner (2004); Greek League All-Star (1997); 3× Greek League assists leader (1997, 1998, 2003); As a head coach: 2× Greek 2nd Division champion (2019, 2021)

Nikolaos "Nikos" Vetoulas (Greek: Νικόλαος "Νίκος" Βετούλας; born February 6, 1974, in Patras, Greece) is a Greek former professional basketball player and coach. As a player, he was a 1.93 m (6 ft 4 in) tall point guard.

== Professional career ==
In his professional playing career, Vetoulas played in the top Greek League with: Apollon Patras, PAOK, Near East, Ionikos N.F., Aris, and AEK Athens. He won the Greek Cup with Aris in 2004.

He also played in the top Italian League with Udine, and in the top Spanish League with Murcia.

== National team career ==
As a member of the Greek junior national team, Vetoulas played at the 1996 FIBA Europe Under-20 Championship.

== Coaching career ==
Vetoulas started his coaching career with Aris in 2008, as an assistant coach to Andrea Mazzon. From 2010 to 2015, he coached Apollon Patras, where he managed to achieve promotion to the top-tier level Greek Basket League, up from the 2nd-tier level Greek A2 Basket League.

On May 28, 2016, Vetoulas was appointed as the head coach of the Swiss League club, SAM Massagno Basket, signing a two-year deal. On July 6, 2016, he left the Swiss club, in order to become the head coach of the top-tier level Greek club Promitheas Patras. On January 30, 2017, Vetoulas was appointed as the head coach of the Greek team Rethymno Cretan Kings. On June 25, 2018, he was appointed as the head coach of Kolossos Rodou.

During the 2020–2021 season, he led Apollon Patras to the Greek 2nd division championship and a promotion to the Greek Basket League after four seasons. Vetoulas stayed with the club until 2023, when he resigned from the team.

On February 7, 2024, Vetoulas was hired from Maroussi. On October 27, following Maroussi's defeat by Panionios, he resigned his position as team coach.
