= VAO (sports club) =

Vizantinos Athlitikos Omilos (VAO)
- Full name: Vizantinos Athlitikos Omilos (Byzantine Athletic Club)
- Founded: 1926
- Colours: Orange, Black

Vizantinos Athlitikos Omilos ("Byzantine Athletic Club") or VAO is a multi-sport club in the city of Thessaloniki. It was founded in 1926. The current seat of the club is the suburb of Thessaloniki Sykies.

Nowadays it maintains departments of basketball, volleyball, cycling, and others. Its colours are orange and black and its emblem is a double-headed eagle.

== History ==
VAO was founded in 1926. The club took part in the first Greek Basketball Championship in 1928. VAO achieved to play in the final but it defeated by Iraklis. The last presence of VAO in the highest level of Greek basketball was the season 1996-97. The club finished in the last place having only three wins. Nevertheless, the club had in its roster the famous NBA player Jeff Malone, and it achieved to win Olympiacos which had won the Triple Crown that season.

VAO had also successful handball team. The team won two Greek cups, in 1983 and 1984. In 2009 the club suspended its operation and merged with Iraklis.

== Honours ==
Basketball team

- Greek Basketball Championship
  - Finalist (1): 1928

Handball team

- Greek Handball Cup
  - Winner (2): 1983, 1984

Wrestling team

- Greek Wrestling Championship
  - Winner (9):1989,1991,1992,1993,1994,1995,1996,1997,1998
