= Near East B.C. =

Sports club in Greece

A.O. Near East
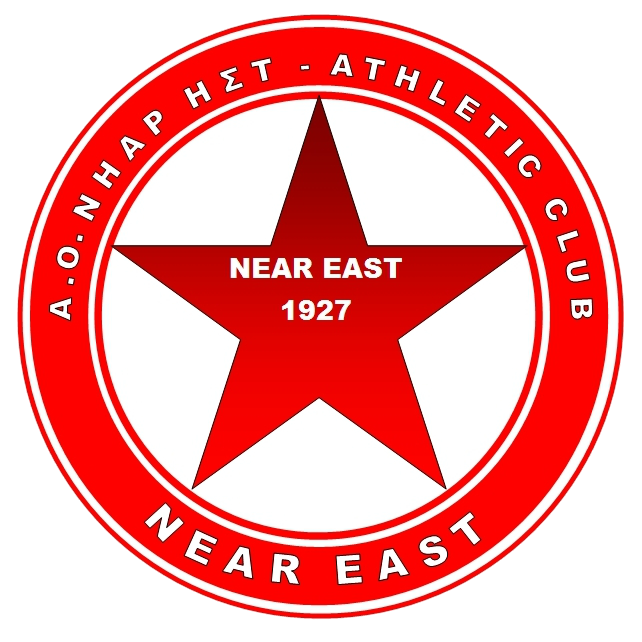
- Leagues: Greek National League 1 Greek Cup
- Founded: 1927
- Arena: Near East Indoor Arena
- Capacity: 1,300
- Location: Kaisariani, Greece
- Team colors: Red White
- Head coach: Tolis Karnesis
- Championships: 1 Greek Basketball League (1936); 1 Greek Elite League (1998)
Home	Away

A.O. Near East is one of the oldest basketball clubs in Greece. The basketball club was founded in 1927. The team is located in Kaisariani. Near East's home arena, Near East Indoor Arena, is located only about 2 miles from the downtown center of Athens. It takes its name from the Near East Foundation.

== History ==
=== Early history ===
Near East B.C. was one of the teams that participated in the first Pan-Hellenic Basketball tournament, which took place in Thessaloniki. In 1936, Near East B.C. won its first official Greek League championship, by defeating the University of Athens basketball team in Thessaloniki. To this day, this is still the only Greek national championship the club has won. In 1937, Near East B.C. finished second in the Greek League championship, as the University of Athens basketball club defeated them in the championship's final.

=== Recent history ===
In more recent times, the Near East basketball team struggled to hold on to its position in the top-tier-level league in Greece, the first division Greek Basketball League. In 1998, the team won the top Greek pro league's second division championship, the Greek A2 League. The team participated in the European-wide 3rd-tier level FIBA Korać Cup, in the years 1999–00 and 2000–01. In 2001–02, the team competed in the Greek first division, for the last time in recent years.

== Arena ==
Near East plays its home domestic league games at the 1,300 seat Near East Indoor Arena.

== Titles ==
- Greek Basketball League:
  - 1936
- Greek Elite League:
  - 1998

== Notable players ==
Note: Flags indicate national team eligibility at FIBA-sanctioned events. Players may hold other non-FIBA nationalities not displayed.

Criteria

To appear in this section a player must have either:

- Set a club record or won an individual award while at the club
- Played at least one official international match for their national team at any time
- Played at least one official NBA match at any time.

Greece:

- (Greece) Antonios Asimakopoulos
- (Greece) Marios Batis
- (Greece) Dimitris Fosses
- (Greece) Kostas Kaimakoglou
- (Greece) Georgios Karagkoutis
- (Greece) Nikos Papanikolopoulos
- (Greece) Kostas Politis
- (Greece) Christos Tapoutos
- (Greece) Kostas Tsartsaris
- (Greece) Nikos Vetoulas
- (Greece) Vangelis Vourtzoumis
- (Greece) Vassilis Xanthopoulos
- (Greece) (Russia) Anatoly Zourpenko

USA:

- (United States) Anthony Bowie
- (United States) Lynn Greer
- (United States) Shawn Respert
- (United States) Randy White
- (United States) David Vaughn III

Rest of Americas:

- (Cuba) Andrés Guibert
- (The Bahamas) Ian Lockhart

Europe:

- (Croatia) (Greece) Franko Nakić

Oceania:

- (Australia) Shane Heal

== Head coaches ==
- (Greece) Takis Koroneos
