= Dafnis B.C. =

Dafni B.C.
- Leagues: Greek A2 League; Greek Cup
- Founded: 1967
- History: Dafni B.C. 1967–2010; Amyntas Dafnis B.C. 2010–2015; Dafni B.C. 2015–present
- Arena: Dafni Indoor Hall (capacity: 1,200)
- Location: Dafni, Greece
- Team colors: Yellow and Black
- Championships: A2 Championships: (1) (1999)
- Website: eurobasket.com/GS-Dafni-Dafniou
| Home | Away |

Dafnis B.C. is a Greek professional basketball club. The club's full name is Athlitikos Omilos Dafnis B.C., or A.O. Dafnis B.C. The club is located in Dafni, Athens, Greece. The colors of the team are yellow and black, and the team's symbol is the laurel branch.

== History ==
The athletic organization's parent athletic union, the A.O. A.C. Dafni, was founded in 1939, when the sports club started with a football club. In 1967, the athletic union added the basketball club, A.O. Dafni B.C., as one of its sports sections.

In 1969, the team competed in the top-tier level Greek Basket League for the first time, and stayed there until 1975. Throughout the 1980s and 1990s, the club often competed in the Greek top-tier league (A1). Legendary EuroLeague player Theo Papaloukas, played with the club from 1997 to 1999. In the 1998–99 season, Papaloukas led Dafni B.C. to the Greek 2nd Division championship. In 2010, Dafni and A.O. Amyntas merged, creating A.O. Amyntas Dafnis. In 2015, the two clubs broke their merger, and Dafni was reformed.

== Championships and honors ==
- Divisional:
  - Greek A2 League: 1
    - 1999

== Notable players ==
Note: Flags indicate national team eligibility at FIBA-sanctioned events. Players may hold other non-FIBA nationalities not displayed.

Criteria

To appear in this section a player must have either:

- Set a club record or won an individual award while at the club
- Played at least one official international match for their national team at any time
- Played at least one official NBA match at any time.

- Fanis Christodoulou
- Theo Papaloukas
- Tzanis Stavrakopoulos
- Dinos Angelidis
- Ioannis Sioutis
- Ioannis Milonas
- Makis Dreliozis
- Nikos Liakopoulos
- Ioannis Gagaloudis
- Fotios Vasilopoulos
- Georgios Limniatis
- Dimitris Fosses
- Dimitris Lolas
- - (Bulgaria) Vasco Evtimov
- Stephen Arigbabu
- Mike Smrek
- - (Jamaica) Rowan Barrett
- Blue Edwards
- Buck Johnson
- Rodrick Rhodes
- Zendon Hamilton
- Richard Rellford
- A.J. Bramlett
- Derrick Chievous
- Gary Plummer
- Bubba Wells
- Scotty Thurman
- Geno Carlisle

== Head coaches ==
- (Germany) Dirk Bauermann
- (Greece) Kostas Missas
- (Greece) Vassilis Fragkias
- (Serbia) Zoran Slavnić
