= Iason Varvaritis =

Greek basketball player

Iason Varvaritis Ιάσων Βαρβαρίτης
No. 12 – Panathinaikos
- Position: Small forward / power forward
- League: Greek Basket League; EuroLeague

Personal information
- Born: 1 May 2010 (age 16) Athens, Greece
- Listed height: 6 ft 8 in (2.03 m)

Career information
- Playing career: 2026–present

Career history
- 2026–present: Panathinaikos

Iason Varvaritis (Greek: Ιάσων Βαρβαρίτης; born 1 May 2010) is a Greek professional basketball player for Panathinaikos of the Greek Basket League and the EuroLeague. He is 2.02 m (6'8") tall, and he can play mainly at the power forward and small forward positions, but at the center, and shooting guard positions as well.

== Youth career ==
Varvaritis started his youth career in 2023 playing for AO Dionysou. In 2024, he moved to Platon Basketball where he stayed for two years. In the 2025–2026 season, he averaged 17.6 points, 7.6 rebounds, 2.9 assists and 1.7 steals, helping his team win the ESKA U16 Championship.

== Professional career ==
In the summer of 2026, Varvaritis joined powerhouse Panathinaikos of the Greek Basket League and the EuroLeague. On 5 September 2026 he was officially announced as a member of the final 2026–2027 roster of the team.

== National team career ==
=== Greek junior national team ===
Varvaritis was first called in the U15 Greek National Team in 2023, playing four games with the team. From the 2025–26 season and on, Varvaritis is a constant member of the U16 Greek National Team. On 5 December 2025, Varvaritis led the U16 Greek National Team to the victory against the U16 Castile and León team, scoring 13 points.
