= Olympiacos B.C. =

Basketball team

Olympiacos Piraeus
- Nickname: Thrýlos (Legend); Erythrólefkoi (Red-and-Whites); Κókkinoi (Reds)
- Leagues: GBL; EuroLeague
- Founded: 1925; 101 years ago (Olympiacos CFP); 1938; 88 years ago (basketball department)
- Arena: SUNEL Arena
- Capacity: 9,025
- Location: Athens, Greece
- Team colors: Red, White
- President: Panagiotis Angelopoulos
- Vice-president: Giorgos Skyndilias
- General manager: Nikos Lepeniotis
- Head coach: Giorgos Bartzokas
- Team captain: Kostas Papanikolaou
- Ownership: Panagiotis Angelopoulos; Giorgos Angelopoulos
- International titles: 4 EuroLeagues; 1 Intercontinental Cup
- Domestic titles: 16 Greek Championships; 12 Greek Cups; 5 Greek Super Cups
- Retired numbers: 7, 15
- Website: olympiacosbc.gr
Home	Away	Third

Olympiacos Basketball Club (Greek: ΚΑΕ Ολυμπιακός Σ.Φ.Π.), commonly known as Olympiacos or Olympiacos Piraeus, is a Greek professional basketball club based in Piraeus, part of the major multi-sport club Olympiacos CFP. The parent club was founded in 1925, and a basketball department was first established in 1938. Currently, and until the completion of the renovation of Olympiacos' home court, the Peace and Friendship Stadium, the club plays its home games at the SUNEL Arena in Athens.

Olympiacos has been established as one of the most successful clubs in Greek and European basketball, having won four EuroLeagues, one FIBA Intercontinental Cup, sixteen Greek Championships, twelve Greek Cups, and five Greek Super Cups. Among Greek clubs, Olympiacos is the first ever to reach a EuroLeague final, as well as to achieve a Triple Crown, and the only one to be crowned back-to-back European champions. Olympiacos is also the Greek club with the most appearances in EuroLeague finals, 10 in total.

The first major achievement of Olympiacos in European competitions was their qualification for the 1978–79 FIBA European Champions Cup semi-finals group stage. However, it was in the 1990s that Olympiacos emerged as EuroLeague contenders, having been runners-up in two consecutive seasons (1994, 1995) and winning their first title in 1997 by beating FC Barcelona 73–58, which was at the time the competition's biggest winning margin in a single-game final. As European champions, they participated in the 1997 McDonald's Championship, where they played against the NBA champions, Michael Jordan's Chicago Bulls. During this period, Olympiacos also dominated the Greek Championship, which had become one of Europe's top national basketball leagues, winning five consecutive titles. Thus, FIBA declared Olympiacos as the best European team of the 1990s.

Olympiacos reached again the EuroLeague final in 2010 and returned to the top of European basketball in 2012, when they won their second EuroLeague title by overcoming CSKA Moscow 62–61 on the last shot of the game, rallying from 19 points down, and achieving the greatest comeback in the competition's finals history. In 2013, Olympiacos won their third title after defeating Real Madrid 100–88, pulling off another memorable comeback, this time overturning a 17-point deficit. These consecutive triumphs, along with two more final appearances (2015, 2017), made the 2010s the most successful decade in the club's EuroLeague history. However, on the domestic front, tensions that had accumulated over the years regarding refereeing decisions ultimately led Olympiacos to refuse to play against their archrivals, Panathinaikos Athens, during the 2018–19 season. As a result, and in accordance with the regulations of the Greek Basket League, the club was relegated to the A2 National Division, where a newly formed squad, Olympiacos B Development Team, competed.

Olympiacos returned to the top-tier Greek league after a two-year absence, a period during which their senior team continued to compete in the EuroLeague. In recent years, the Reds have once again become one of the most consistent contenders for the European crown, having qualified for five consecutive Final Fours, a record for the club, having been runners-up in 2023 and eventually winning their fourth EuroLeague title in 2026.

Some of the greatest players in European basketball have played for Olympiacos over the years, including Charlie Yelverton, Carey Scurry, Žarko Paspalj, Giorgos Sigalas, Dragan Tarlać, Walter Berry, Panagiotis Fasoulas, Roy Tarpley, Eddie Johnson, Alexander Volkov, David Rivers, Artūras Karnišovas, Dino Radja, Thodoris Papaloukas, Alphonso Ford, Tyus Edney, Arvydas Macijauskas, Miloš Teodosić, Nikola Vujčić, Linas Kleiza, Rašho Nesterović, Kostas Papanikolaou, Kyle Hines, Acie Law, Georgios Printezis, and Vassilis Spanoulis. In 2008, Olympiacos signed NBA player Josh Childress, whose US$20 million net income contract for three years made him the highest-paid basketball player of all time in Europe.

== History ==
=== 1930s–1960s ===
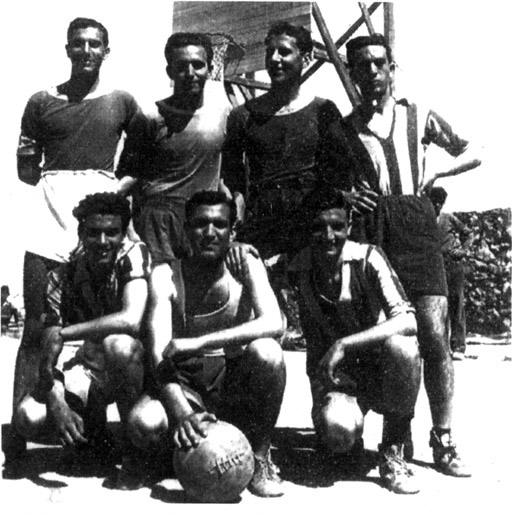
Olympiacos team in 1943

Olympiacos basketball club has its origins in the 1930s, when the first attempts to establish it were made, in 1931 and then again in 1938. After World War II, the "red-and-whites" were the first Greek team to familiarize themselves with American basketball, as Alekos Spanoudakis learned to use the jump shot, and his brother, Ioannis Spanoudakis (who was both a player and the head coach of the team), met basketball legend Bob Cousy and practiced many of his techniques on the court. During the Spanoudakis brothers' era, Olympiacos won their first Greek Championship in 1949, as well as a second in 1960, and were consistently among the best Greek teams throughout the 1950s. As Greek champions, they also qualified for their first European competition, the 1960–61 FIBA European Champions Cup.

However, this last success was followed by a period of sharp decline, and in 1964, as the Spanoudakis brothers' playing days were coming to an end, Olympiacos was relegated to the Greek Second Division. In early 1967, Faidon Matthaiou, the so-called "patriarch" of Greek basketball, took over as the head coach, and, under his guidance, the club was promoted back to the First Division. In the late 1960s and early 1970s, the Reds were a decent and tough team, with key players such as Thanasis Rammos, Tolis Spanos, Makis Katsafados, Manolis Efstratiou, and Stelios Amerikanos, but they were not yet capable of claiming the championship against the dominant forces of Athenian and Greek basketball at that time, AEK and Panathinaikos.

=== 1970s–1980s ===
The arrival of 22-year-old Greek-American Steve Giatzoglou in early 1972 proved to be a game changer. Later that year, he was followed by fellow Greek-Americans Giorgos Kastrinakis, Pavlos Diakoulas, and, in 1974, Paul Mellini. These U.S. college graduates, along with the remaining old guard of the 1960s and the signings of experienced Greek players such as Giorgos Barlas, Nikos Sismanidis, Aris Raftopoulos, and Christos Iordanidis, as well as younger players such as Kimon Kokorogiannis and Giannis Garonis, formed the core of Olympiacos' rosters from 1972 until 1981, which was arguably the best period in the club's history up to that point.

After three seasons in which Olympiacos narrowly lost the Greek Championship to Panathinaikos, the Reds became champions again in 1976 in impressive fashion, without losing a single game. They went on to win the newly established Greek Cup, achieving the first domestic Double in the history of Greek basketball. In the same season, Olympiacos also reached the quarter-finals of a European competition for the first time. This was the year that Olympiacos fans' dreams finally came true and the pinnacle of Faidon Matthaiou's coaching career with the club.

During the following season, Kostas Mourouzis was appointed as the head coach, and the Reds won the Greek Cup again, after first eliminating archrivals Panathinaikos by defeating them 110–68 in front of 20,000 spectators at the Panathenaic Stadium. This 42-point difference remains the largest in the history of the matches between the two clubs. In 1978, Olympiacos won their fourth Greek Championship, having lost only one game this time, as well as their third consecutive Greek Cup, achieving their second Double in three years.

In 1979, Olympiacos also achieved their first major success in the top European competition, reaching the semi-finals group stage of the 1978–79 FIBA European Champions Cup, where they faced Real Madrid, Pallacanestro Varese, Maccabi Tel Aviv, Bosna Sarajevo, and Joventut Badalona. Olympiacos was a difficult team to beat in Piraeus, winning one game and losing the rest by narrow margins, but they easily lost most of their away games against the best European clubs, eventually finishing sixth.

In early 1980, coach Mourouzis left Olympiacos as a worthy successor to Matthaiou's legacy. He was replaced by former club player Giorgos Barlas, who led the Reds to yet another Greek Cup victory. This was to be the last trophy for Olympiacos until the 1990s. Matthaiou returned as head coach for the following season, and Olympiacos finished second in the Greek League for the third consecutive time, marking the end of a great era.

Over the next decade the Reds were not only overshadowed by the rising powers of Thessaloniki, Aris and PAOK, but also often performed poorly enough to finish in the bottom half of the Greek League standings. After the departure of Mellini in 1980, Diakoulas in 1982, Giatzoglou and Kastrinakis in 1984, the team was led by players such as Andreas Kozakis, Giannis Paragios, Tzimis Maniatis, and Argyris Kampouris, the hero of the EuroBasket 1987 final. However, their efforts were not enough to bring notable results, with the exception of the 1985–86 season, when Olympiacos finished second in the Greek League and reached the Greek Cup final. The 1988–89 season was the first in which non-Greek players were allowed to participate in Greek basketball competitions, but even former NBA players such as Carey Scurry and Todd Mitchell were unable to lead the club to success.

=== 1990s: FIBA's best European team of the decade ===
In the 1991–92 season, businessman Sokratis Kokkalis took over the management of the club, and the situation changed radically, as Olympiacos brought in the top Greek basketball coach, Giannis Ioannidis, and the Yugoslav star Žarko Paspalj. In addition, the club left the old Papastrateio Indoor Hall to move to the Peace and Friendship Stadium (commonly called SEF), the largest indoor arena in Greece until the inauguration of the OAKA Indoor Arena in 1995. With SEF being packed for most of their games, the Reds became one of the best-supported basketball teams in Europe. The club had now fully recovered, climbing once again towards the top of the Greek League.

Five consecutive Greek Championship titles from 1993 to 1997 and two Greek Cup titles in 1994 and 1997 established Olympiacos as the dominant club in Greece. In addition to their domestic successes, the Reds became one of the most successful clubs in the FIBA EuroLeague of the 1990s, as they won the title in 1997, were finalists in 1994 and 1995, and finished third in 1999, leading FIBA to select them as the Best European Team of that decade.

==== 1991–96: Four consecutive Greek championships, two-time EuroLeague runners-up ====
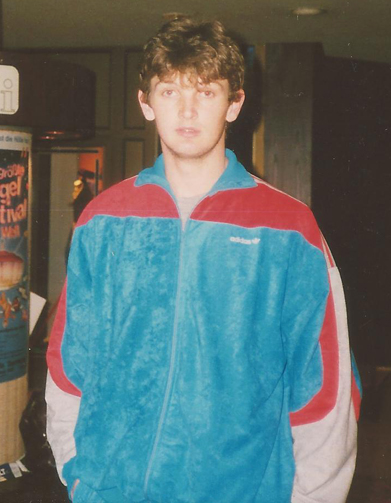
Žarko Paspalj

After the radical changes that took place at the club in the summer of 1991, expectations were now high. Olympiacos was initially eliminated in the quarterfinals of the Greek Cup after a heavy defeat to Aris Thessaloniki. However, the Reds managed to join the duo of Aris and PAOK Thessaloniki as contenders for the Greek League, eventually finishing in second place behind PAOK and earning a spot in the next FIBA European League.

In the 1992–93 season, former NBA and Aris player Walter Berry, as well as 19-year-old Yugoslavs Dragan Tarlać and Milan Tomić, joined Žarko Paspalj and 21-year-old homegrown talent Giorgos Sigalas to form the core of Olympiacos' roster. The Reds' journey in the European League began against Olimpija Ljubljana in the second qualifying round and continued in the group stage, where they finished third, advancing to the quarterfinals alongside Arvydas Sabonis' Real Madrid, Toni Kukoč's Benetton Treviso, and Gheorghe Mureșan's Pau-Orthez. However, Olympiacos failed to qualify for the Final Four held at their home venue, the Peace and Friendship Stadium, as they were eliminated in Beaublanc by the eventual European champions, Limoges CSP, with the third game in a best-of-three series being decided in the dying seconds by an off-balance two-point shot by Slovenian star Jure Zdovc.

In the Greek Cup, Olympiacos was eliminated for the second time in a row by Aris, the winners of the 1992–93 FIBA European Cup. In a highly competitive Greek League, the Reds finished 4th in the regular season. In the quarterfinals they narrowly edged out Aris. In the semifinals, they eliminated defending champions PAOK, which had just finished third in the European League Final Four. In the finals, Olympiacos faced Panathinaikos Athens, which had home-court advantage. With the series tied 1–1, the Reds won the third game at Panathinaikos' home. As the Greens refused to play the fourth game in protest of the refereeing, the match was awarded to Olympiacos, which celebrated their first Greek Championship since 1978.

In the 1993–94 season, Berry left Olympiacos for PAOK, and Tarlać was unavailable due to injury, but the Reds were reinforced with another former NBA and Aris player, Roy Tarpley, and the iconic PAOK captain, Panagiotis Fasoulas. After an excellent run in the group stage, Olympiacos qualified as group leaders for the quarterfinals, where they eliminated the Italian champions, Sasha Danilović's Virtus Bologna, and reached the Final Four of the European League for the first time in their history. In the Final Four in Tel Aviv, which featured two teams from Catalonia and two from Attica, Olympiacos defeated Panathinaikos in the semifinal, 77–72, with Paspalj scoring 22 points and Tarpley achieving a double-double with 21 points and 16 rebounds. Olympiacos became the first Greek team ever to compete in the final of the top European basketball competition, but, despite being the favorites to win the European crown, they lost 57–59 to Joventut Badalona after failing to score in the last seven minutes of the game.

Domestically, Olympiacos had an extremely successful season, as they celebrated the Double. First, they won the Greek Championship by prevailing in a dramatic best-of-five series over PAOK, the winner of the 1993–94 FIBA Korać Cup. Then, they won their first Greek Cup since 1980, after defeating Iraklis Thessaloniki in the final.

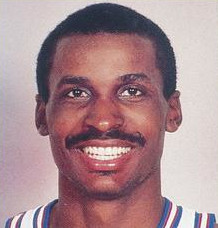
Eddie Johnson

In the 1994–95 season, in a shocking move, Paspalj left Olympiacos for Panathinaikos. The Reds responded by signing the star of Panathinaikos, Sasha Volkov and NBA veteran Eddie Johnson. Olympiacos once again started as one of the favourites to win the European League, finishing second in their group and earning home-court advantage for the next round. In the quarterfinals, they eliminated CSKA Moscow - a series in which the Russian team started the decisive third game with only five players available and finished it with three, claiming that the rest of the squad had been poisoned, in one of the strangest and most baffling incidents in the history of European basketball. In the Final Four in Zaragoza, Olympiacos faced their archrivals Panathinaikos in the semifinals for the second consecutive year. They defeated them again, 58–52, with 27 points and 10 rebounds from Johnson, including four three-pointers in the last minutes of the game. The Reds qualified for the European League final for the second time in a row, where they played against Real Madrid, which won 61–73.

Olympiacos and Panathinaikos' rivalry reached new heights in domestic competitions, characterized by overwhelming pressure on both teams' players and extremely low scoring in the matches between them. The Reds were eliminated early from the Greek Cup after losing 40–42 to their eternal enemies in a knockout match held at the neutral venue of the Sporting Indoor Hall. In contrast, Olympiacos managed to win their third consecutive Greek Championship after a 45–44 home victory over Panathinaikos in the decisive fifth game of the finals.

The 1995–96 season saw the arrival of French League MVP David Rivers and the return of Walter Berry, as Volkov retired from basketball and Johnson returned to the NBA. Although the Reds had another impressive run in the European League's group stage, they finished third due to a three-way tie with CSKA Moscow and Benetton Treviso. In the quarterfinals, Olympiacos was eliminated in a best-of-three series by Real Madrid, which had home-court advantage.

In the Greek Cup, the Reds were once again eliminated by Panathinaikos, which went on to win not only this title but also the much-coveted European League. Nevertheless, the season ended in the most memorable fashion, as Olympiacos crushed the newly crowned European champions in the fifth game of the Greek League finals with a score of 73–38, which remains the biggest winning margin in a game between the two teams for the Greek League and the second biggest overall after the legendary 110–68 for the Greek Cup in 1977. Thus, Olympiacos won their fourth consecutive Greek championship in front of their ecstatic fans, who celebrated the title and the historic victory in a euphoric frenzy at Peace and Friendship Stadium.

==== 1996–97 season: European champions and Triple Crown glory ====
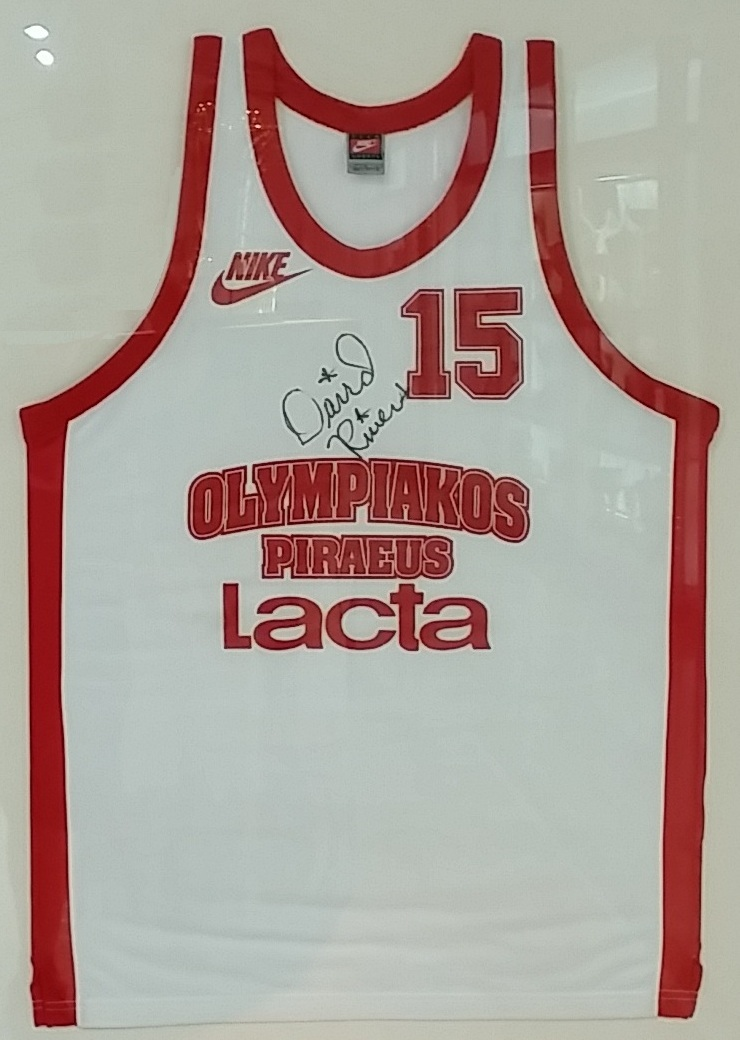
David Rivers' jersey from the 1997 EuroLeague Final

The most significant event of the summer of 1996 was not a player transfer, but the departure of head coach Giannis Ioannidis after five seasons. During this period, Olympiacos emerged as the dominant force in the Greek League and one of the top powers in European basketball, though ultimately failing to win the European League title. He was succeeded by Dušan Ivković, the club's first non-Greek head coach. Ivković had previously achieved great success with the national teams of SFR Yugoslavia and FR Yugoslavia, won the Greek championship with PAOK Thessaloniki in 1992, and come very close to pulling off a major upset with Panionios Athens against Panathinaikos Athens in the previous season's Greek League semifinals.

During the EuroLeague regular season, Olympiacos' performance was not as strong as in previous years. However, they were impressive in the playoffs, breaking the home-court advantage of both their opponents. Their first "victim" was Partizan. In a series full of surprises, Olympiacos won the first and third games in Belgrade and advanced to the next round, despite a loss in the second game in Piraeus. In the quarterfinals, they faced their archrivals and reigning champions, Panathinaikos. With memories of the 73–38 victory in the previous year's Greek League finals still fresh, Olympiacos once again crushed the Greens, this time in front of their opponents fans at the OAKA Indoor Arena, with a score of 69–49. The Reds also won the second game at the Peace and Friendship Stadium, securing their spot in the Final Four, held in Rome. There, Olympiacos delivered two dominant performances against Olimpija Ljubljana (74–65) and FC Barcelona (73–58), recording the competition's largest winning margin in a single-game final up to that point, and were crowned European champions for the first time in their history. Meanwhile, thousands of their fans at the PalaEUR Arena sang, “in Rome, in the final, we lifted the European trophy” (Greek: Στη Ρώμη και στον τελικό, σηκώσαμε Ευρωπαϊκό), a chant that remains one of the club's most popular to this day. David Rivers led the team, averaging 27 points across the two games, and was named the Final Four MVP.

Less than two weeks before their triumph in Rome, the Reds had already won the Greek Cup, defeating Apollon Patras 80–78 in the final. One more step remained to seal the most successful season in the history of Greek club basketball. They achieved this emphatically, winning their fifth consecutive Greek championship by defeating AEK Athens 3–1 in the finals series. Therefore, Olympiacos became the first Greek club to win the Triple Crown and remained the only one to do so until 2007.

==== 1997–98 season: McDonald's Championship final against Chicago Bulls ====
In October the club played in the 1997 McDonald's Championship in Paris. Having defeated Atenas de Cordoba in the semi-final by 89–86, Olympiacos played against the NBA champions Chicago Bulls in the final. The game was played under zone-friendly European rules (the games between NBA and FIBA teams were played under a mixture of NBA and FIBA rules at that time), but, out of respect for the Bulls, Olympiacos never used a zone defence. Olympiacos was defeated 78–104, by the Bulls, and one of the greatest basketball players ever, Michael Jordan.

Olympiacos were once again the favourites in all the competitions they were taking part. They started the season with an impressive record of consecutive wins in Greece and Europe. But in the second half of the season, things went wrong for the team. Olympiacos played in the round of 16 of the EuroLeague, with a home court advantage against Partizan in a three-game series, but they lost both matches in Athens and Belgrade and the European Champions suffered an early and disappointing elimination. In the Greek Cup's Final Four, they faced Panathinaikos for the 3rd place and they won easily.

In the Greek League, Olympiacos finished the regular season in second place, behind Panathinaikos. In the semi-finals, Olympiacos faced PAOK, having a home court advantage in a best of three series. In the first match in Athens, Olympiacos took a tight 66–65 win and held the advantage. They lost the second match in Thessaloniki, and the last game was held again in Athens. Olympiacos lost 58–55 in Neo Faliro, marking the first ever defeat for the team in Peace and Friendship Stadium during the Greek playoffs. The Reds did not have the chance to defend their crown and they ended up in third place, with a 3–1 series win over AEK Athens.

==== 1998–2000 ====
The 1998–99 season did not begin well, because in the season's opening match of the Greek Cup, Olympiacos was eliminated by PAOK. The Reds played once again in the EuroLeague Final Four, and although they were considered the favorites to win the title, they lost 71–87 in the semi-final to the eventual winners Žalgiris Kaunas. They finished third, defeating Fortitudo Bologna 74–63 in the 3rd place game. In the Greek League they were the favorites to win the championship, but despite having the home advantage in the finals against Panathinaikos, they were defeated in the last game of the series at home and lost the title. That was the first time Olympiacos lost a playoff game to Panathinaikos in SEF after 10 consecutive wins.

In the 1999–2000 season, Olympiacos did not make the EuroLeague playoffs, as they were eliminated in the round of 16 by Olimpija Ljubljana. On the contrary, they finished first in the regular season of the Greek League and entered the playoffs having home court advantage. But in the semi-finals they played against fourth-placed PAOK and they were eliminated, losing the first game at home and the second one in Thessaloníki. Olympiacos faced AEK for the third place and won.

=== 2000s ===
==== 2000–03 ====
In the 2000–01 season, Olympiacos played in the first EuroLeague competition that was organized by EuroLeague Basketball, but despite having home court advantage in the playoffs they were eliminated by Baskonia Vitoria-Gasteiz. In the Greek League Finals, they finished second.

In the 2001–02 season, the club managed to win the Greek Cup, their first trophy since 1997, in a Final Four tournament that was held at Peace and Friendship Stadium. They beat Panathinaikos 83–75 in the semi-final and Maroussi 74–66 in the final. Then they came within one victory of the EuroLeague Final Four. They played in the Top 16 in a group against Panathinaikos, AEK and Olimpija Ljubljana, with only the first placed team advancing to the Final Four. After Olympiacos completed an easy 92–75 win over Panathinaikos with Alphonso Ford scoring 21 points in the opening home match, another home win against AEK, and an away win against Olimpija, they played an away game against Panathinaikos and lost 78–88. The score of that game gave the Reds the aggregate advantage in case they finished on the top of the group along with their rivals, a scenario that looked highly probable. However, in the fifth group game, the weakest team of the group, Union Olimpija, stunned Olympiacos in Athens by winning their single game in the group. This put Olympiacos in second place and despite their away win against AEK in the last game of the group, their unexpected loss against Olimpija kept them out of the Final Four in Bologna. In the Greek League the Reds eliminated Peristeri in the quarter-finals and managed to break the home court advantage of Panathinaikos in the first game of the playoffs semi-final with a well-deserved 80–89 win in OAKA and after a thrilling second win at home with 80–76, they eliminated them and made it to the finals. In the finals, they managed to break AEK's home court advantage in the first game of the series (82–74) and after a second comfortable win at SEF in Game 2 (75–70) they were very close to the title. Despite starting the finals with those two comfortable wins, their 2–0 lead did not prove enough as they lost three games in a row and let the title slip away.

Olympiacos was one of the EuroLeague's most dangerous teams in 2002–03 as well. They had a decent regular season, finishing third in a tough group of eight teams and qualified to the next phase at the expense of teams like Real Madrid and Partizan Belgrade. The club came closer than any team to knocking off the eventual champions FC Barcelona in two heartbreaking games in the EuroLeague Top 16 groups (55–58, 77–80) and proved, despite the fact that they were not at their best during the early 2000s, that they were able to beat any team at any time.

==== 2003–05 crisis ====
The 2003–04 and 2004–05 seasons were the worst in the modern history of Olympiacos. In both seasons, the team was eliminated in the Greek Cup and finished in the 8th place of the Greek League. Especially in the latter season, Olympiacos had a dismal performance in the EuroLeague, which filled many of the club's fans with uncertainty.

==== 2005–06 season: Rebirth ====
The 2005–06 season saw the return of the Red giants, which overcame the previous down years with a nice combination of young talent and experienced veterans which paid off for the club. Players added to the club like Renaldas Seibutis, Quincy Lewis, Panagiotis Vasilopoulos, Giorgos Printezis and, above all, Sofoklis Schortsanitis, were viewed by some to be a possible solid core of players for the team for many years to come. That season seemed to be very promising for the Red giants. However, the promising Reds were eliminated from the Greek Cup in their first knock-out match of the competition. Olympiacos survived a difficult EuroLeague regular season and shined in the Top 16, advancing to the quarterfinal playoffs. The Reds were just a win away from making it to the Final Four for the first time since 1999. Maccabi Tel Aviv won the best-of-three playoff series 2–1, but game 3 went down to the wire. Experience proved to be a decisive factor in the final 2 minutes of the game, when the hosts managed to seal a 77–73 win and advanced to the Final Four in Prague. Tyus Edney earned EuroLeague February MVP honors, as well as ranking third in assists at the end of the regular season and second in the Top 16. Olympiacos also shined in its domestic competition, as the Reds made it to the Greek League finals for the first time in five years by surviving a thrilling five-game series against Maroussi. Despite their losing in the final playoff series, it was clear that the Reds were back where they used to be, becoming a team able to challenge for every title.

==== 2006–07 season ====
In the 2006–07 season, with the signings of head coach Pini Gershon and Arvydas Macijauskas, the Reds were one of the favorites to claim the Euroleague 2006–07 crown, but they did not manage to qualify to the Athens Final Four. They were eliminated from the Greek Cup as well. In the Greek League playoffs, they made it to the finals after winning 3–2 a best of five semi-final against Aris. Although Olympiacos had to overcome their home court disadvantage, they won the last match in Thessaloniki and made it to the best of five finals, having again a home court disadvantage, this time against Panathinaikos. The club had to beat their arch-rivals to win their first Greek Championship since 1997. But they finished second in one of the best final series ever played in the Greek League. At the opening game of the series in Panathinaikos' home, the Reds lost 72–79, but they won the second game in Peace and Friendship Stadium 76–72. In the third match, Olympiacos lost 86–85 in overtime, with the Reds complaining furiously against the referees, who did not call a clear foul against Scoonie Penn with only 3 seconds left in the game. Olympiacos won the next game easily, 78–68 in Piraeus, but in the last away game, the Reds lost 76–89.

==== 2007–08 season ====
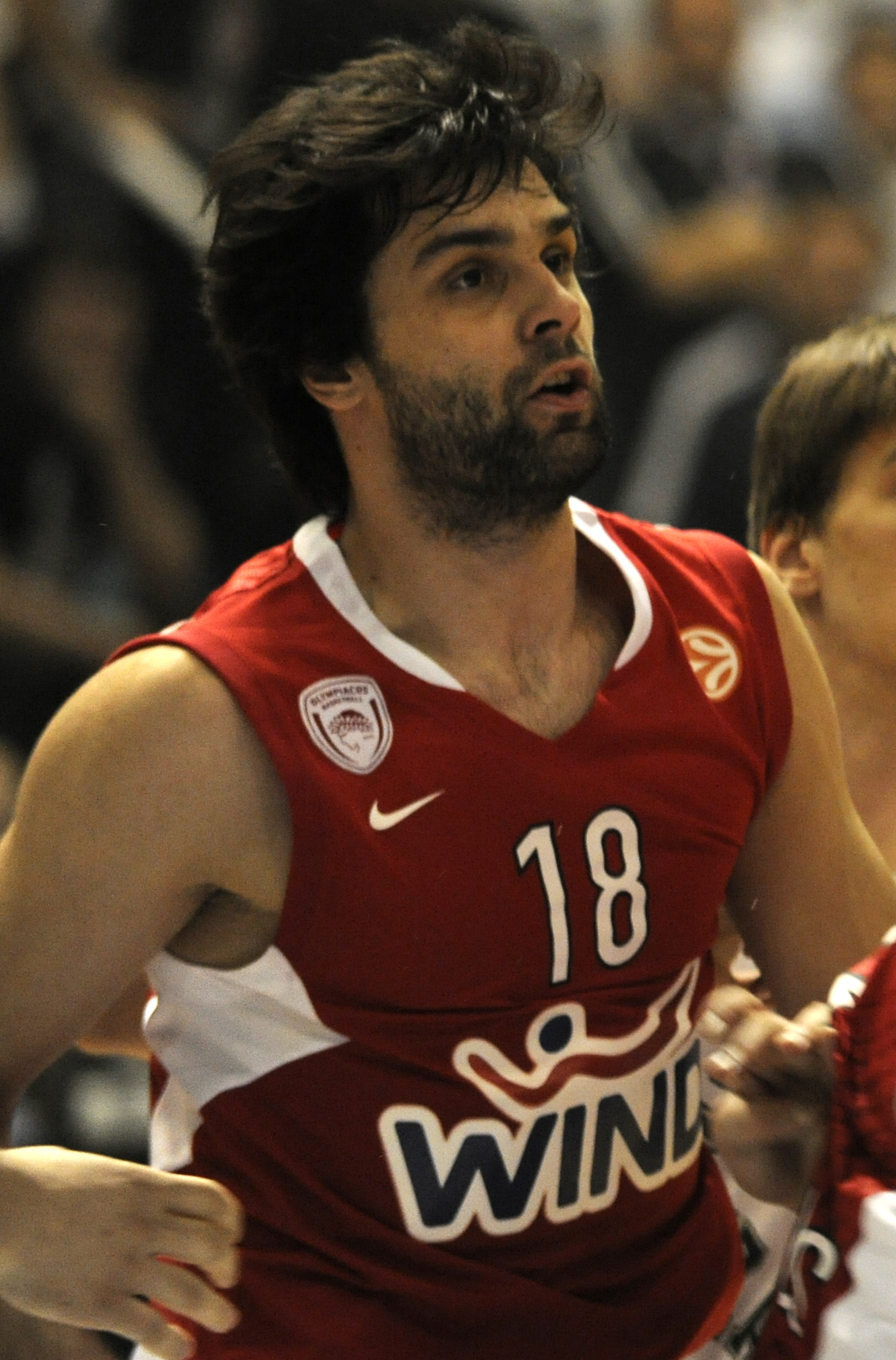
Miloš Teodosić

In the 2007–08 season, Olympiacos was once again considered amongst the favorites to reach the Final Four of the EuroLeague. It was also considered one of the two favorites, along with Panathinaikos, to win the Greek championship. In the Greek League regular season the team had a record of 22 wins and 4 defeats, and had the second most prolific offensive team in the league. In the quarter-finals of the playoffs, Olympiacos swept AEK Athens in a best-of-three series and in the semi-finals they beat Maroussi in a best-of-five series, 3–2. They finally finished second, losing in the finals of the Greek League. They also reached the final of the Greek Cup after 4 years, but they did not manage to take the title. In the EuroLeague, the team qualified for the third phase of the competition (quarter-finals). They played against the eventual winners CSKA Moscow and despite grabbing a thrilling away win in the first match of the series in CSKA Universal Sports Hall in Moscow (76–74 with Qyntel Woods scoring 20 points and Lynn Greer sinking a spectacular game-winning buzzer beater which ended CSKA's 27-game winning streak at home), they lost the second game in Piraeus and were eventually eliminated by 2–1 wins after the third game in Moscow.

==== 2008–09 season: Return to the EuroLeague Final Four ====
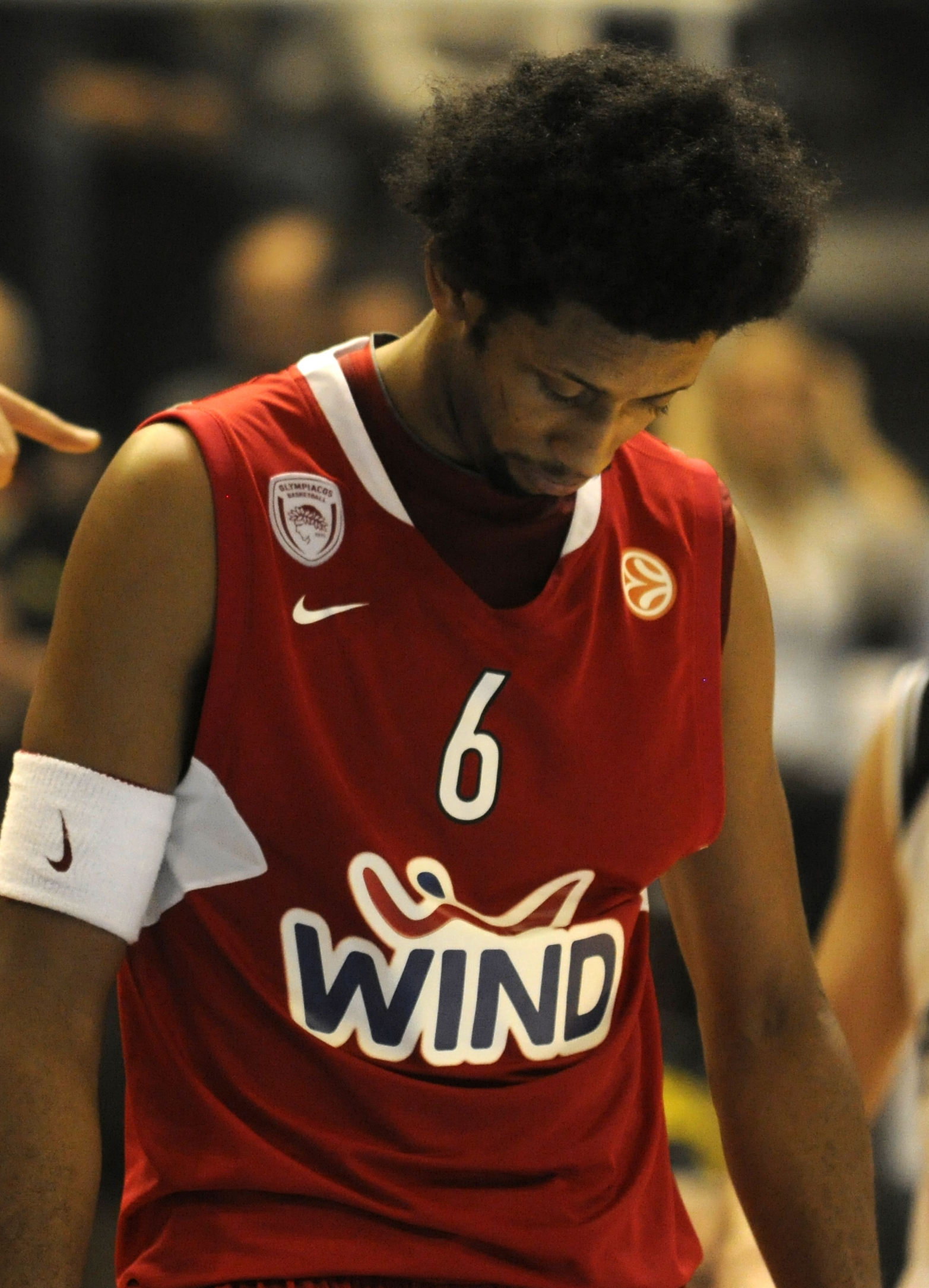
Josh Childress

The 2008–09 season began with high expectations due to a big budget and a great roster with players like Josh Childress, Thodoris Papaloukas, Miloš Teodosić, Nikola Vujčić, Ioannis Bourousis, Lynn Greer, Panagiotis Vasilopoulos, Sofoklis Schortsanitis and Georgios Printezis. The club's season was only moderately successful however, as they reached the finals of both the Greek Cup and the Greek Championship. In the Greek Championship regular season, the team set a record with 25 wins against only 1 defeat, but in the finals of the Greek League playoffs, they lost the series 3–1, despite having the home court advantage. In the EuroLeague, they reached the Final Four for the first time in 10 years, eliminating Real Madrid with 3–1 wins. Having secured the home advantage, they won the first two games in Piraeus (88–79 and 79–73) and managed to secure an away win (75–78) in Madrid in Game 4 of the series, thus advancing to the EuroLeague Final Four after 1999. In the Final Four in Berlin, they faced arch-rivals Panathinaikos in a close, heartbreaking thriller: Olympiacos trailed by two points and had the ball for the last possession. The ball went to Bourousis but his close shot bounced out, with Childress being unable to score with a last-second tip as well. Despite the loss in a match that could have easily gone either way, the team's great effort and the club's return to the elite of European basketball were clear signs of their future success.

==== 2009–10 season: EuroLeague runners-up ====
The 2009–10 season was the best in a long time for Olympiacos. The management wanted to bring another big player to the team, after Josh Childress. And they did, agreeing with the Lithuanian NBA player of the Denver Nuggets, Linas Kleiza. With the help of these two and under the guidance of coach Panagiotis Giannakis the club managed to take the Greek Cup defeating their arch-rivals Panathinaikos 68–64 in the final. In the EuroLeague, the Reds had an impressive run in the regular season and the Top 16, finishing as group winners in both phases. In the quarter-final playoffs, the faced the Polish champions Asseco Prokom Gdynia and eliminated them with 3–1 wins, reaching for the second consecutive season the EuroLeague Final Four which was held in Paris. In the semi-final the team managed to defeat Partizan Belgrade 83–80 in overtime in a thrilling match, with Kleiza scoring 19 points. Olympiacos returned to the EuroLeague Final after 1997, facing FC Barcelona, the very team they had beaten in the 1997 Final. History did not repeat itself, as Olympiacos lost 68–86 to FC Barcelona in the final. In the Greek Championship finals, the club lost 3–1 wins to Panathinaikos after an intense third game that would have put them ahead 1–2, with the Reds having again huge complaints over the referees' performance. The fourth game of the series was disrupted several times and the arena was cleared of all fans to complete the remaining few minutes.

=== 2010s ===
==== 2010–11 season ====
In July 2010, Olympiacos offered a three-year contract worth €13,200,000 gross income to the famous Greek guard Vassilis Spanoulis, and came to an agreement with the player. The great Serbian coach Dušan Ivković agreed with the club, and with a roster of players such as Miloš Teodosić, Vassilis Spanoulis, Theodoros Papaloukas, Loukas Mavrokefalidis, Jamon Gordon, Rasho Nesterović, and Ioannis Bourousis, Olympiacos became a favorite to win the 2010–11 Euroleague. In the opening game of the Top 16, Olympiacos got a 70–84 defeat in Athens, against Fenerbahçe Ülker, but one month later, Olympiacos defeated the Turkish champions with a 65–80 win in Istanbul, and took the first place of the Top 16 Group H. In the quarter-finals, Olympiacos faced Montepaschi Siena. In the first game of a best-of-five series, the Reds achieved a great performance, defeating Mens Sana with an 89–41 score, at the Peace and Friendship stadium, in Athens, but the Italian club managed to win the second game (65–82), breaking the home advantage of the Reds. Olympiacos did not manage to win any of the next two away games, and got eliminated from the 2011 Euroleague Final Four. On 15 May 2011, Olympiacos defeated arch-rivals Panathinaikos, 74–68, in the Greek Cup Final, and won the ninth Greek Cup in the club's history. In the Greek League, Olympiacos took the first place in the regular season, but despite earning home-court advantage for the finals, they lost the first game at home, and suffered a 3–1 defeat in a best-of-five series, as they let a chance at the championship slip away.

==== 2011–12 season: European and Greek champions ====
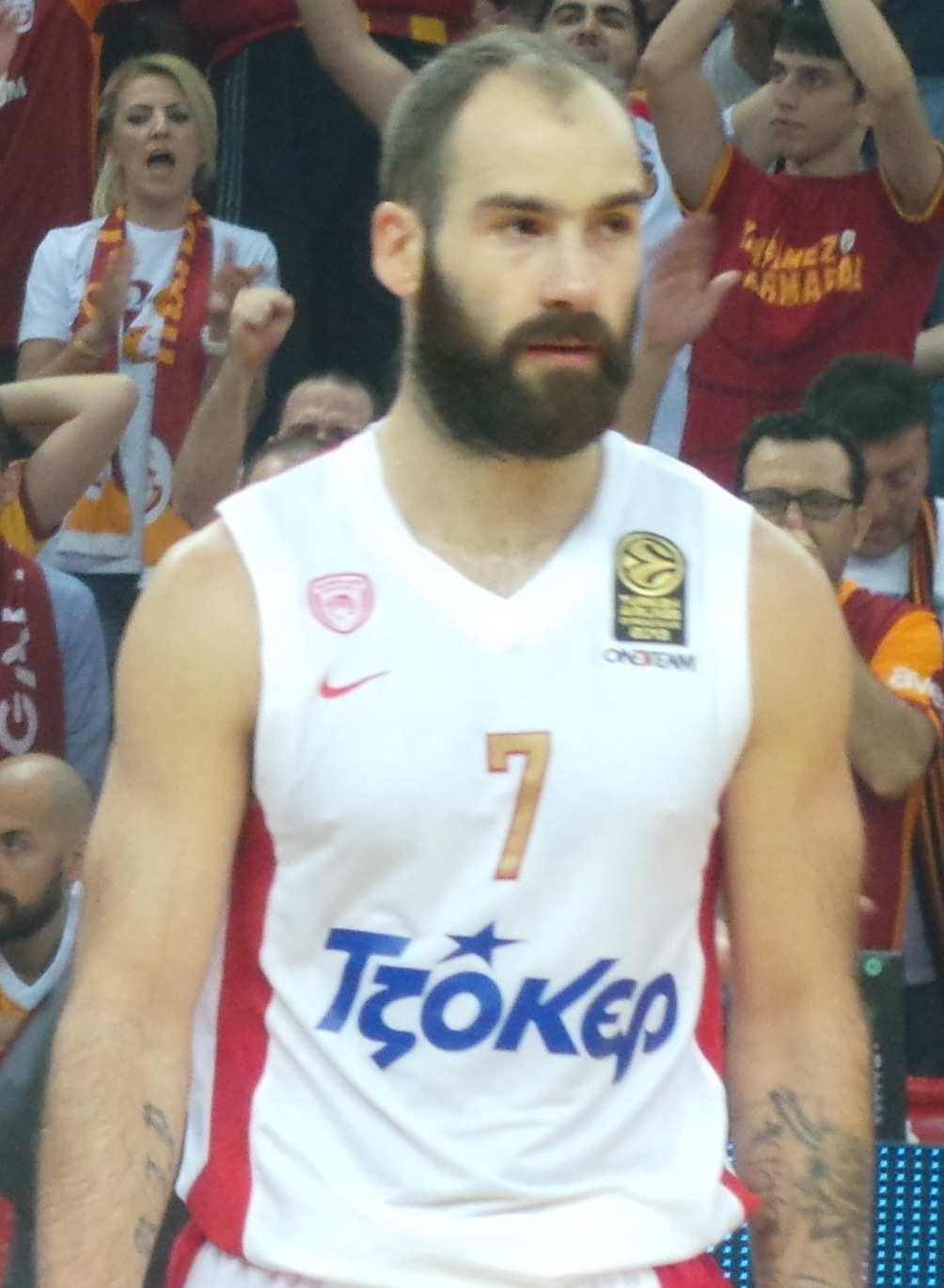
Vassilis Spanoulis

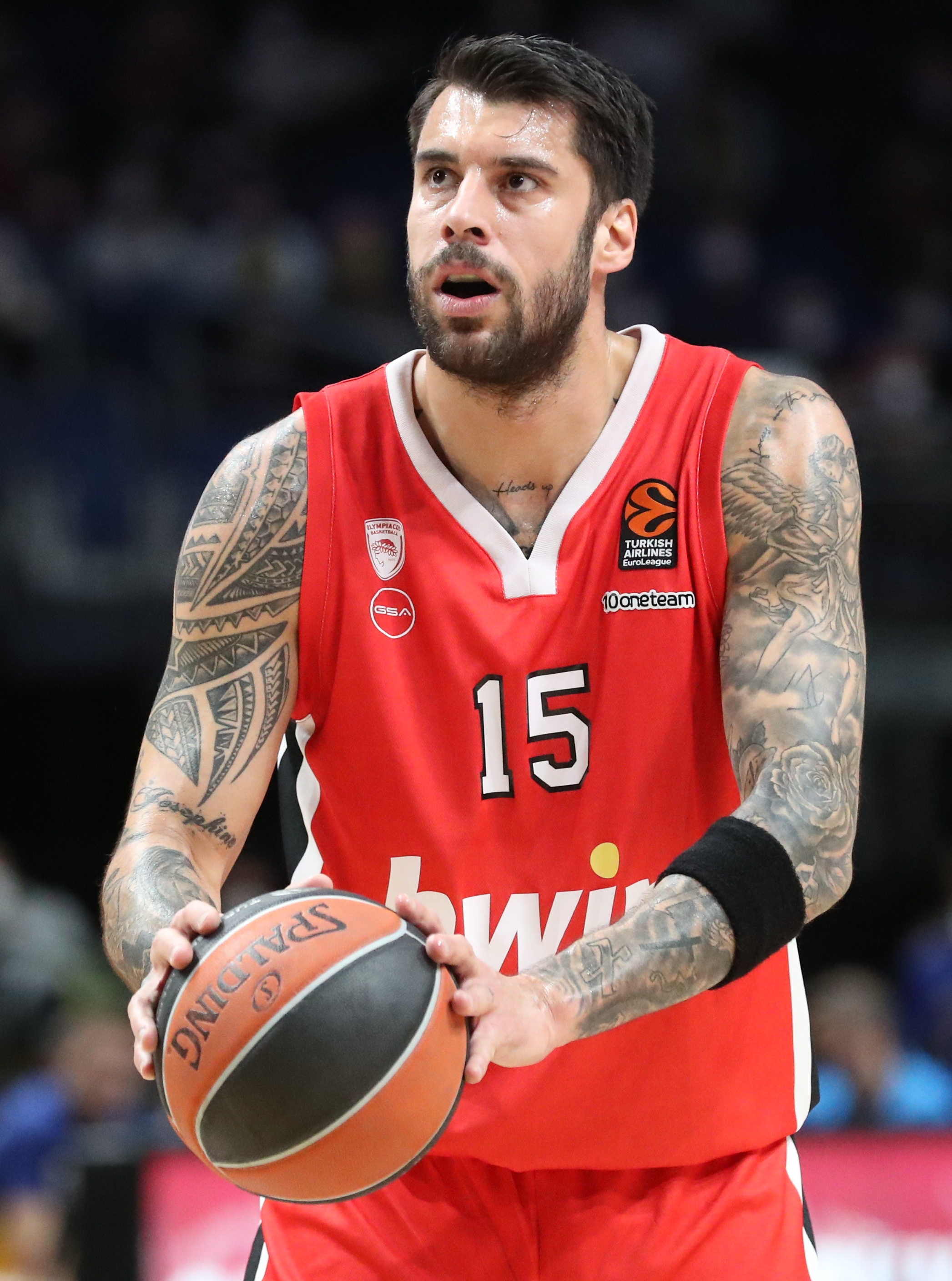
Georgios Printezis

In the summer of 2011, Olympiacos saw many experienced players leave the team, after a reduction of the team's budget by over 50%. The youthful team under coach Dušan Ivković initially heavily depended on team leader Vassilis Spanoulis, losing games regularly when he was not playing. The team that the press thought might not even qualify for the Top 16, improved dramatically over the course of the season, and under the great performances of Vassilis Spanoulis, Georgios Printezis, Kostas Papanikolaou, Kyle Hines, Joey Dorsey, Pero Antić, Acie Law, Kostas Sloukas, and Vangelis Mantzaris, Olympiacos managed to reach the 2011–12 Euroleague Final Four in Istanbul, after breaking the home-advantage of the Italian champions, Mens Sana Siena, winning with a 75–82 score in the first game of a best-of-five series in Italy, in a reversal of the previous season's quarter-finals. Going to Istanbul as an outsider, Olympiacos upset the odds, and beat the two favourites, FC Barcelona in the semi-final, with a score 68–64, and CSKA Moscow in the final, with a 62–61 score, coming back after trailing by 19 points in the most dramatic final in the history of EuroLeague. Printezis scored a game-winner, off an assist from Spanoulis, with a few tenths of a second left, to complete the epic comeback, and give Olympiacos the win, and the second EuroLeague Championship in their history. Vassilis Spanoulis, the man who provided the assist for Printezis' buzzer-beating hook-shot, was voted Final Four MVP. The most successful season of the Reds since 1997, was completed by seizing the Greek Championship as well. They eliminated PAOK in the quarter-finals, and Panionios in the semi-finals, securing their spot in the Greek Finals undefeated. They entered the Greek Finals having the home-court advantage, after their first place in the regular season, and their impressive 23–1 record. There, Olympiacos faced their arch-rivals Panathinaikos, and won the best-of-five series 3–2 (84–78, 84–72, 82–76), celebrating the tenth Greek Championship in their history, and their first since 1997.

==== 2012–13 season: Back-to-back European champions ====
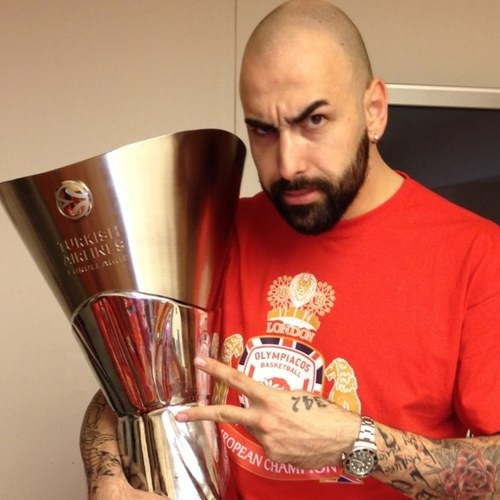
Pero Antić holding Olympiacos 2013 back-to-back Euroleague trophy in London

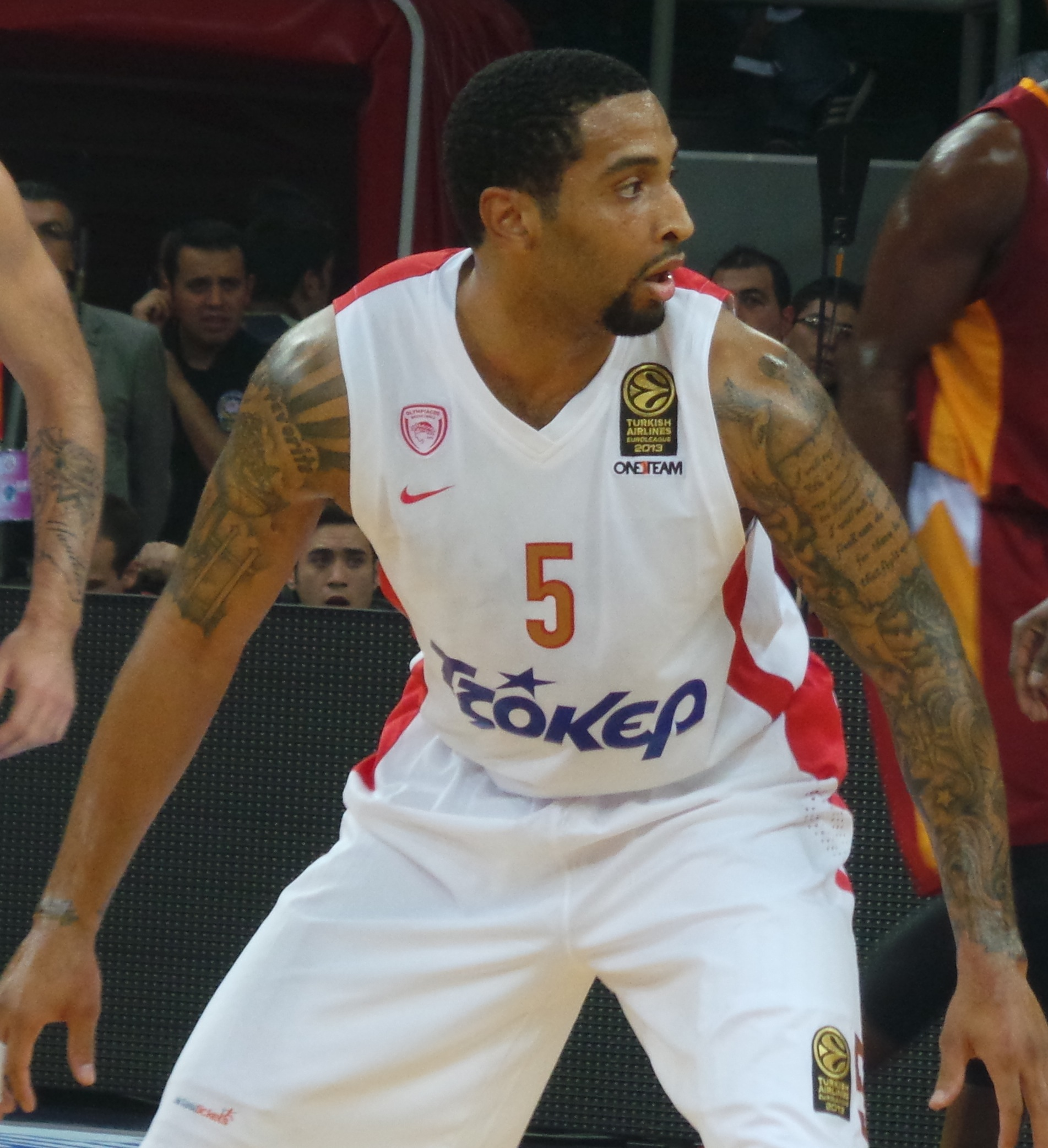
Acie Law wearing the golden-badged back-to-back European Champions 2012 –2013 Olympiacos jersey

After the end of a dreamy season, both domestically and internationally, legendary coach Dušan Ivković decided to leave the club, leaving the club's owners, the Angelopoulos brothers, with a hard decision regarding his replacement. The club's owners decided to hire the highly promising Greek coach Giorgos Bartzokas (who had very successful tenures in Marousi and Panionios) as the new head coach of the European Champions. Stratos Perperoglou, Giorgi Shermadini and the two-time NBA Champion Josh Powell joined the team to replace Marko Kešelj, Joey Dorsey, and Lazaros Papadopoulos. In May 2013, Olympiacos, under the guidance of coach Bartzokas, became EuroLeague Champion for the second year in a row, becoming the first and only Greek club, and the only club since Maccabi Tel Aviv in European-wide basketball, to become back-to-back EuroLeague Champions, in the Euroleague Basketball Company era (Euroleague 2000–01 season to present), and only the third club in history since the establishment of the modern era Final Four format in 1987–88 season, to achieve that honour. After a solid display in both the regular season and the Top 16, they qualified for the quarter-finals, having earned the home advantage. They faced Anadolu Efes Istanbul, and managed to eliminate the Turkish side, by winning the best-of-five series 3–2, after a thrilling Game 5 in SEF. Olympiacos managed to rally from a 15-point second-quarter deficit to win the game, with an 82–72 scoreline, thus securing the chance to defend their European crown in the Final Four. In the Final Four, Olympiacos managed to put forth two outstanding basketball displays. After rolling past CSKA Moscow with a smashing 69–52 win in the semi-final, they managed to beat Real Madrid 100–88 in the final at London's The O2 Arena, roaring back from a 17-point deficit in the first quarter, and scoring 90 points in the remaining three-quarters. EuroLeague MVP Vassilis Spanoulis led the charge with 22 points (all in the second half), and was eventually voted Final Four MVP for the second consecutive season, and third overall in his career. Thus joining Toni Kukoč, as the only two players in history to achieve that distinction on three occasions. Acie Law scored 20 points with 5 assists, and Kyle Hines added 12 points with 3 blocks, one of which was a spectacular chase-down block on a fast break layup attempt by Nikola Mirotić.

==== 2013–14 season: FIBA Intercontinental Cup champions ====
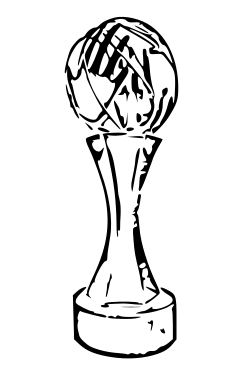
2013 FIBA Intercontinental Cup

After winning the EuroLeague championship for the second straight season, Olympiacos qualified to play at the 2013 edition of the FIBA Intercontinental Cup, against the 2013 FIBA Americas League champions, Pinheiros Basquete, for the official Club World Cup title. The two-game aggregate score series was hosted in Ginásio José Corrêa Arena, in Barueri, São Paulo, and Olympiacos dominated the series. They won both games quite convincingly (2–0), winning the first game of the series by a score of 81 to 70, and the second game by a score of 86 to 69. Team captain Vassilis Spanoulis was named the 2013 FIBA Intercontinental Cup MVP. Olympiacos lifted the trophy in front of their ecstatic fans from the Greek community of Brazil, and celebrated their third international title in less than 2 years. In the EuroLeague, they reached the quarter-finals, where they played against Real Madrid, the very team they had beaten in the previous year's final. Real Madrid entered the series with home-court advantage, and Olympiacos couldn't overturn the situation, losing the series 3–2 to the Spanish champions, after five intense games, and missing the chance to defend their back-to-back European crown.

==== 2014–15 season: EuroLeague runners-up, Greek champions ====
In the 2014–15 season, Olympiacos had another great season, reaching the EuroLeague Final, and seizing the Greek Championship in a convincing way. In EuroLeague, after an impressive run in the regular season and the Top 16, they qualified for the quarter-finals for the tenth consecutive season (2006–2015), which was an all-time record in European basketball history at the time, shared with FC Barcelona, the very club they were drawn to play against for a Final Four spot. FC Barcelona entered the series with the home-court advantage, and won the first game at home. Olympiacos bounced back from the loss, and managed to put on a top-class display in Game 2, beating FC Barcelona 63–76, at Palau Blaugrana. With the home-advantage in their hands, the Reds beat FC Barcelona twice at Peace and Friendship Stadium, winning the playoff series 3–1. Game 4 of the series was nothing less than a dramatic thriller. The game was tied at 68–68, with only 5.2 seconds remaining on game the clock. Olympiacos had possession of the ball, and just a small amount of time for a last play. The ball went to Georgios Printezis (hero of the 2012 EuroLeague Final), who hit a buzzer-beating three-pointer to secure the Final Four spot for his team (71–68), with Olympiacos fans erupting in frenetic celebrations. In the Final Four in Madrid, Olympiacos beat CSKA Moscow, 70–68, in the semi-final, coming back from a 9-point deficit in the last four minutes of the game. Captain Vassilis Spanoulis led Olympiacos to the final, by scoring 11 points in the last minutes of the 4th quarter, by hitting some really tough shots in the game's last crucial minutes. In the EuroLeague Final, Olympiacos did not manage to win their third EuroLeague title in four years, as they lost to rivals Real Madrid, who played the final at their home court. Despite the title loss, Olympiacos proved yet again their dominating presence in European basketball, as they had become the most successful club in European basketball since 2008, with two EuroLeague Championships (2012, 2013), three other EuroLeague Finals appearances (2010, 2015, 2017), and six EuroLeague Final Four appearances in seven years (2009, 2010, 2012, 2013, 2015, 2017).

In Greece, Olympiacos had a great regular season, ending up with an impressive record of 25 wins and only 1 defeat. In the playoffs, they reached the finals, after eliminating Aris in the semi-finals (3–1 series win). In the finals, they totally dominated the series, and swept their arch-rivals Panathinaikos, with a 3–0 series win (76–70, 69–76, 93–74). Winning the 2015 Greek Championship in convincing fashion. Team head coach Giannis Sfairopoulos' guidance, as well as the team's solid performance, both defensively and offensively, paved the way for the historic 3–0 series sweep in the Greek League Finals, which was met with big celebrations from Olympiacos fans, at the title ceremony in SEF.

==== 2015–16 season: Back-to-back Greek champions ====
The 2015–16 season proved historical for Olympiacos, who had gained home court advantage in the Greek League playoffs, after a 25–1 regular season record. In the Greek League finals they faced their arch-rivals Panathinaikos and despite losing the first game at home, they managed to win the best-of-five series 3–1, to clinch its second consecutive title at Panathinaikos home court.

Olympiacos captain Vassilis Spanoulis scored a buzzer-beating three-pointer in front of Nick Calathes, helping Olympiacos win the second game of the series with 68–66, breaking Panathinaikos' home court. Then, with the best-of-five series being 2–1 in favour of Olympiacos, the two teams faced each other again in O.A.C.A. Vassilis Spanoulis, shocked Panathinaikos again, this time at the last second of the second overtime of the game: Panathinaikos led by two points and Spanoulis, who was being guarded by Dimitris Diamantidis (in what proved to be the last match of his career), stepped back from him and buried a buzzer-beating three point shot from 9 meters distance, winning the match and the title inside their rivals' home court, in front of 19,000 stunned Panathinaikos fans. Vassilis Spanoulis scored 25 points in Olympiacos 82–81 decisive win and was voted Greek Basket League MVP and Greek Basket League Finals MVP.

==== 2018–19 season: Withdrawal from the Greek League with the motto: "Until the end" ====
The 2018–19 season was the most turbulent in Olympiacos and Greek basketball history. It was the season that the ongoing feud between Olympiacos and Panathinaikos peaked, following Olympiacos decisions after their long-lasting protests for the relationship of the Hellenic Basketball Federation with Panathinaikos, the officiating in the games between the two arch-rivals and the exclusion of EuroLeague referees from national competitions.

Initially, in the 2018–19 Greek Cup semi-final against Panathinaikos, Olympiacos decided to withdraw and to not return for the second half of the game in protest for the referees decisions, despite the possible sanctions for the team for leaving the game. In the following day, Olympiacos announced that they would not play again any league or cup game against Panathinaikos, unless it was officiated exclusively by foreign referees, as well as any national competition game against any opponent, if any of the forementioned Cup semi-final's referees (Anastopoulos, Manos and Panagiotou) was set to officiate; furthermore, Giannakopoulos was not anymore allowed to enter the Peace and Friendship Stadium under any capacity he might be using, also asking from the authorities to investigate the extremely low betting odds for Panathinaikos to win the Cup semi-final, after the referees' names were announced. At first, Olympiacos was punished with a deduction of 6 points from the same year's league table.

Olympiacos announced that their decisions were fully supported by the parent club's Olympiacos CFP chairman, Michalis Kountouris. As the time for the game of the 2018–19 Greek League's second round was approaching, Olympiacos officially informed the Hellenic Basketball Federation that they insist on their position not to play any game officiated by the three forementioned referees, or any game against Panathinaikos that will not be officiated by foreign referees. Previously, Panathinaikos had expressed their opposition to the demand of the Reds. After the announcement of the Greek referees who were going to officiate the forthcoming derby, Olympiacos announced that they would not participate in the game, and even a last minute meeting under the Greek Deputy Minister for Sports ended with a quarrelling between the people of the two clubs and with Panathinaikos' owner Giannakopoulos cursing Olympiacos' owners and chanting about the forthcoming relegation of his club's eternal enemy. PAO was awarded the away win for this game by 20–0 and Olympiacos was penalized with point deduction.

For the last matchday of the league's regular season, the central refereeing committee announced that Anastopoulos, one of the three referees of Cup semi-final, was drawn to officiate Olympiacos' home game against Promitheas Patras, after Giannakopoulos pressure for the three referees to be included in the draw for the Reds game. That meant that if Olympiacos insisted on their position not to take part in a game officiated by Anastopoulos, Manos and Panagiotou, then the red giant would be relegated to the second division, a penalty for any team that forfeits two league games. Finally, Anastopoulos was replaced after his request not to officiate the game, which took place regularly, something that led Panathinaikos to protest with their withdrawal from their last regular season game against Kymi, which was awarded the win and escaped relegation, while the Greens were punished with a 6-point deduction.

In the final standings of the regular season, Panathinaikos with −6 points and Olympiacos with −8 points, and one more point not awarded to each one, were ranked in the 3rd and 6th place respectively despite having the two best records, which meant that they were to play against each other in the first playoffs round. However, Olympiacos proceeded to legal action, asking from the high council for the solution of athletic disputes to void the last matchday of the regular season, pointing out that all referees assignments were illegal, thus the playoffs were postponed for one week. The Hellenic Basketball Clubs Association decided to confirm the final standings, with Olympiacos talking about violation of the sporting legislation.

Olympiacos announced that they would not compete in the playoffs against Panathinaikos, since not only were foreign referees not appointed, but also two of the Cup semi-final referees (Anastopoulos and Manos) were drawn to officiate the first playoffs derby. In the face of this possibility Euroleague Basketball president, Jordi Bertomeu, accused the Hellenic Basketball Federation of not intervening to resolve the dispute between Olympiacos and Panathinaikos, describing the situation of the Greek basketball and the forthcoming relegation of Olympiacos as unthinkable. Olympiacos, finally, did not appear in the first playoffs game at Panathinaikos home arena, which meant that the Reds would get relegated to the second division for forfeiting two league games, Later, the Hellenic Basketball Clubs Association officially announced the relegation of Olympiacos to the Greek A2 Basket League, due to the non-participation in a league playoffs game; Olympiacos were eliminated for the rest of the playoffs and were also placed at the bottom of the final standings, with all their results voided and non-replaceable.

The club's former coach, Giannis Sfairopoulos, stated that Olympiacos chose the extreme way to change a situation that existed for years, something they tried to do in various ways in the past but nothing worked, and that they have to change the status in Greek basketball. Panathinaikos' coach, Rick Pitino, stated that Greek basketball needs Olympiacos and asked from them to change their mind. Hellenic Basketball Federation's president, George Vassilakopoulos, after his long-lasting silence, stated: "It will be a disaster for basketball, for such a great club with a history like Olympiacos to play in the second division and a solution must be reached fast. I'm clear about this". Newly appointed Greek Deputy Minister for Sports, Lefteris Avgenakis, and Vassilakopoulos, both agreed that Olympiacos should be part of the Greek Basket League and that a solution should be found, while his predecessor, Giorgos Vasiliadis, also accused of his passive stance, revealed that he had requested FIBA to send foreign referees to the league games. However, no action was taken maybe due to Panathinaikos constant threats that they would withdraw from the league, if Olympiacos remained in the first division. In the meantime, Olympiacos appeals about the league last matchday's legality were rejected, and they decided to take the Hellenic Basketball Clubs Association to the sports court.

Finally, Olympiacos announced that they decided to register an entirely separate squad for the 2019–20 Greek second division and 2019–20 Greek Cup, for reasons of legality, and that squad would be a secondary "B" team, with a different name (Olympiacos B Development Team) and using the Peace and Friendship Stadium's practice court as their home arena, with the senior team playing exclusively in EuroLeague, which "has all the elements that characterize a serious, modern and reliable league", according to their announcement. After losing the first EuroLeague game of the season against ASVEL Villeurbanne, Olympiacos and David Blatt parted ways. His assistant Kęstutis Kemzūra became the head coach of the team until the end of the season.

=== 2020s ===
==== 2020–21 season ====
During the 2020 off-season, Kostas Sloukas returned to Olympiacos after five years with Fenerbahçe Istanbul. On the other hand, Nikola Milutinov joined CSKA Moscow after a five years stint at the club. The Reds also signed Hassan Martin from Budućnost Podgorica, Livio Jean-Charles from ASVEL Basket, Aaron Harrison from Galatasaray Istanbul and Charles Jenkins from Red Star Belgrade. Brandon Paul and Taylor Rochestie were released, while Wade Baldwin IV moved to Bayern Munich, Augustine Rubit to Žalgiris Kaunas and, later in April, Jenkins to CB Canarias.

In the EuroLeague, Olympiacos finished twelfth in the regular season with a negative win-loss record, failing to qualify for the playoffs for the second consecutive time, not counting the previous season, which was ultimately cancelled due to the COVID-19 pandemic.

In domestic competitions, Olympiacos B Development Team was eliminated in the second phase of the Greek Cup after a defeat to Kolossos Rhodes. Olympiacos B then finished second in the regular season of the A2 National Division and, after beating Panerythraikos Athens and Maroussi Athens in the promotion playoffs, secured the club the right to compete in the Basket League next season.

==== 2021–22 season: EuroLeague Final Four, domestic double ====
The summer of 2021 was marked by the announcement of Vassilis Spanoulis' retirement. Spanoulis left archrivals Panathinaikos Athens for Olympiacos in 2010, leading the team as captain for the past eleven years. During his tenure with the club, he lifted two EuroLeague trophies and three Greek championships, was named the EuroLeague Final Four MVP in 2012 and 2013, as well as the 2012–13 EuroLeague MVP, and was selected to the All-EuroLeague First Team and the All-EuroLeague Second Team three times each, among many other achievements, making him a legend of Olympiacos, Greek and European basketball.

During the off-season, the Reds signed Thomas Walkup from Žalgiris Kaunas, Moustapha Fall from ASVEL Basket and Tyler Dorsey from Maccabi Tel Aviv, while Octavius Ellis and Aaron Harrison moved to Türk Telekom Ankara.

In the EuroLeague, after several lackluster years, Olympiacos emerged as title contenders again, finishing second in the regular season. In the playoffs, they eliminated AS Monaco with 3–2 wins and qualified for the Final Four after five years. Sasha Vezenkov was selected to the All-EuroLeague First Team and Kostas Sloukas to the All-EuroLeague Second Team, while Giorgos Bartzokas was named EuroLeague Coach of the Year for the second time in his career. In the 2022 Final Four held in Belgrade, Olympiacos lost in the semifinal to reigning champions Anadolu Efes Istanbul 74–77, with Vasilije Micić hitting the winning three-pointer in the last second of the game. The Reds then lost to FC Barcelona 74–84, finishing in fourth place.

On the domestic front, the change in the helm of the Hellenic Basketball Federation, which Giorgos Vassilakopoulos controlled for decades, prompted the owners of Olympiacos, Panagiotis and Giorgos Angelopoulos, to decide on the club's return to the Basket League after a two-year absence. The Reds were not eligible to compete in the 2021 Greek Super Cup, but nevertheless dominated the season, first defeating Panathinaikos 81–73 in the Greek Cup final and then sweeping the Greens in the Basket League finals, celebrating their first championship in six years, their thirteenth overall, and their first domestic double since the 1996–97 triple-crown season.

==== 2022–23 season: EuroLeague runners-up, domestic treble ====
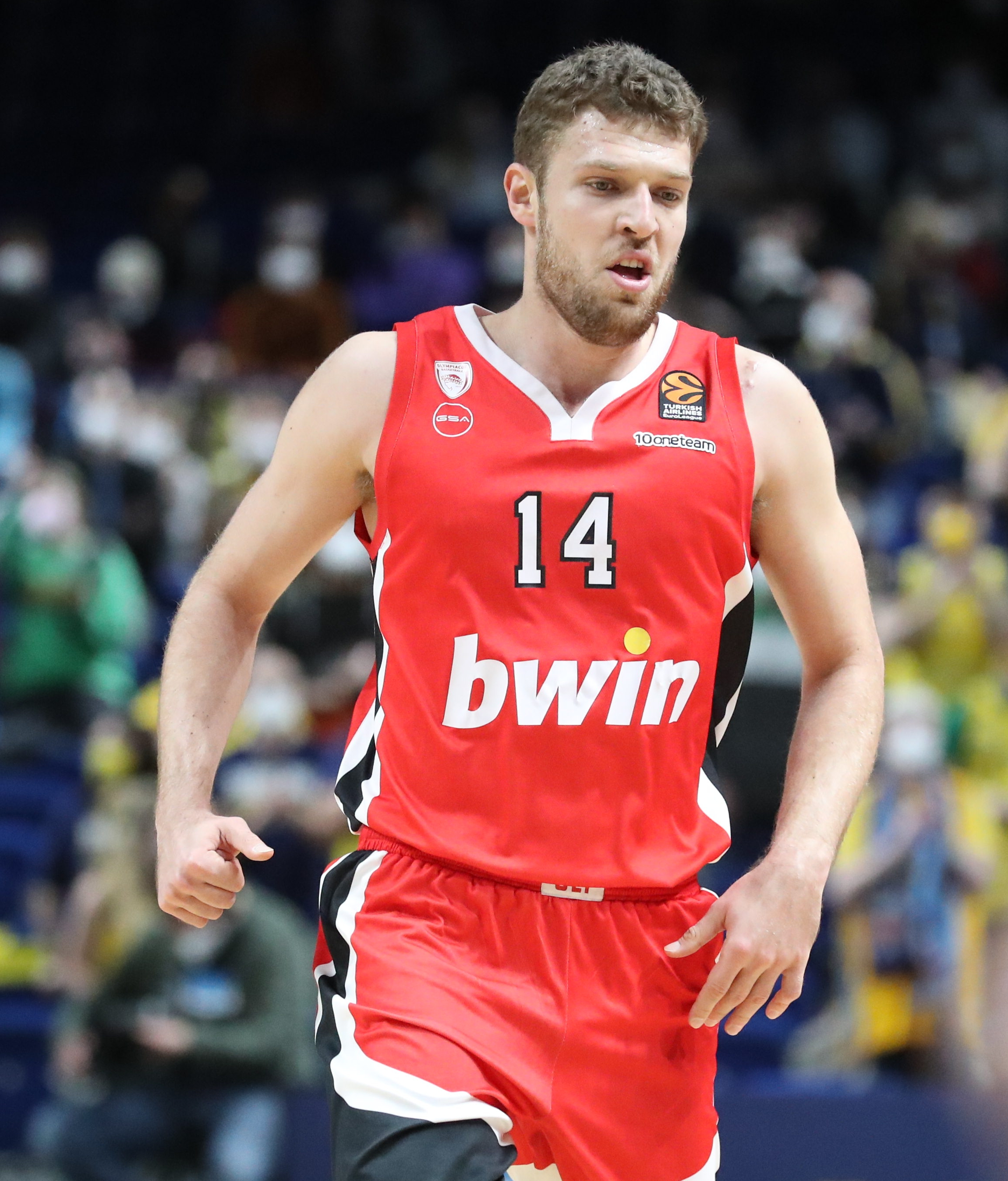
Sasha Vezenkov

During the 2022 off-season, Olympiacos brought in Alec Peters from Baskonia Vitoria-Gasteiz, Isaiah Canaan from Galatasaray Istanbul and Joel Bolomboy from CSKA Moscow. Tyler Dorsey joined the NBA's Dallas Mavericks, while Hassan Martin moved to Red Star Belgrade and Livio Jean-Charles to CSKA Moscow. However, the most important news of this summer was the retirement of the iconic Georgios Printezis at the age of 37. The highlight of his 19-year career with the club was the game-winning shot in the 2012 EuroLeague final against CSKA.

In the EuroLeague, Olympiacos finished first in the regular season, an unprecedented feat for a Greek team since the competition switched to a single-group format, while also having the best defensive record. In the playoffs, the Reds eliminated Fenerbahçe Istanbul with 3–2 wins and qualified for their second consecutive Final Four, with a three-pointer by Kostas Sloukas in the last second of the third game at the Ülker Sports Arena giving Olympiacos the win and proving crucial to the outcome of the series. Sasha Vezenkov won the EuroLeague MVP Award, the third Olympiacos player to do so after Miloš Teodosić and Vassilis Spanoulis, the EuroLeague Top Scorer Trophy and was selected to the All-EuroLeague First Team, while Giorgos Bartzokas was named EuroLeague Coach of the Year for the second consecutive time and third overall. In the 2023 Final Four held in Kaunas, Olympiacos easily defeated AS Monaco 76–62, after a record-breaking dominant performance in the third quarter with a partial score of 27–2, and reached the final for the first time since 2017. There they faced Real Madrid, as they had in 1995, 2013, and 2015. With 29 points from Vezenkov and 21 from Canaan, the Reds found themselves leading by six points with 2:13 remaining, but failed to score for the rest of the game. Eventually, a high-arching jump shot by Sergio Llull with 3 seconds left gave Real the win, 78–79, and the title.

In domestic competitions, Olympiacos had a perfect season, winning all three titles. They started by defeating Panathinaikos 67–52 in the Super Cup final and went on to win the Greek Cup final against Peristeri Athens 85–57. In the Basket League finals, they comfortably prevailed over Panathinaikos with 3–1 wins. It is noteworthy that the fourth game of the series at Panathinaikos' home court, the OAKA Indoor Arena, was abandoned in the 27th minute while the score was 63–35 in favor of the Reds, due to extensive crowd violence. As a result, the match was awarded to Olympiacos, who celebrated their fourteenth championship as well as their first domestic treble.

==== 2023–24 season: EuroLeague Final Four ====
During the 2023 off-season, two familiar faces from the past returned to the club: Nikola Milutinov from CSKA Moscow and Nigel Williams-Goss from Real Madrid. However, the highlights of the summer transfers were two departures: that of Sasha Vezenkov to the Sacramento Kings and that of Kostas Sloukas to archrivals Panathinaikos Athens, while Joel Bolomboy moved to Red Star Belgrade. In November, the Reds signed Filip Petrušev from the Sacramento Kings and, in January, Moses Wright from Merkezefendi Belediyesi Denizli.

In the EuroLeague, Olympiacos finished fifth in the regular season, once again having the best defensive record. In the playoffs, they eliminated FC Barcelona with 3–2 wins in a dramatic best-of-five series, despite Barça's home-court advantage, and they qualified for their third consecutive Final Four, a feat they had never accomplished before, while Thomas Walkup was awarded the EuroLeague Best Defender Trophy. Ιn the 2024 Final Four held in Berlin, the Reds were easily defeated in the semifinal by reigning champions Real Madrid 76–87 and eventually took third place, overcoming Fenerbahçe Istanbul 87–84.

In domestic competitions, Olympiacos won both the Greek Super Cup and the Greek Cup, defeating Panathinaikos 75–51 and 69–58 in the respective finals. However, in the Basket League finals, they were ultimately edged out by their archrivals, who a month earlier had been crowned the new European champions, as the Greens overturned the Reds' initial 2–0 lead in wins and celebrated the championship. It was the first time since 2002 that the eventual champions came back after losing the first two games in the finals series.

==== 2024–25 season: EuroLeague Final Four, Greek champions ====
During the 2024 off-season, Sasha Vezenkov returned to Olympiacos after a year with the Sacramento Kings, as did Tyler Dorsey from Fenerbahçe Istanbul. Isaiah Canaan and Filip Petrušev joined Red Star Belgrade, the latter on loan. The Reds also signed Evan Fournier, a regular member of the France national team in the previous decade, who returned to Europe after twelve years in the NBA, Luca Vildoza from Panathinaikos Athens and, in February, Saben Lee from Manisa Basket.

In the EuroLeague, Olympiacos finished first in the regular season for the second time in the last three years. Vezenkov was selected to the All-EuroLeague First Team and Fournier to the All-EuroLeague Second Team. In the playoffs they eliminated Real Madrid with 3–1 wins, qualifying for their fourth consecutive Final Four, a new record for the club, while Vezenkov was named EuroLeague Playoffs MVP. However, in the 2025 Final Four held in Abu Dhabi, Olympiacos were defeated in the semifinal by coach Vassilis Spanoulis' AS Monaco 68–78, despite Fournier's 31 points, eventually taking third place for a second time in a row, after beating Panathinaikos 97–93.

In domestic competitions, Olympiacos won the Greek Super Cup for the third consecutive year, defeating Panathinaikos 86–85 in the final. On the other hand, the Greens were the ones who prevailed 75–79 in the Greek Cup final. The two eternal enemies also faced off in the GBL finals, where Olympiacos triumphed with 3–1 wins and celebrated their fifteenth title, while Vezenkov was named GBL Finals MVP. It was the first time since 1993 that the Reds won the championship without starting with home-court advantage in the finals.

==== 2025–26 season: European and Greek champions ====
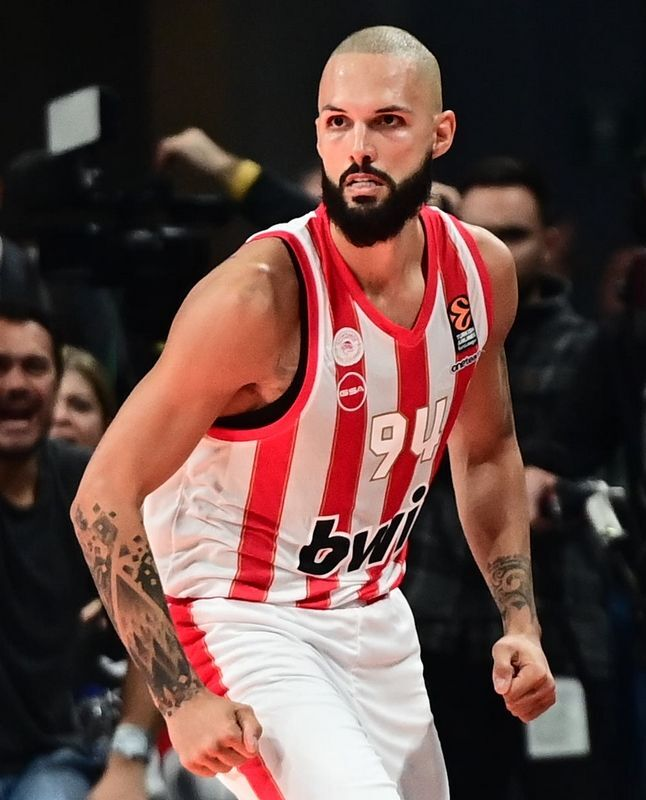
Evan Fournier

During the 2025 off-season, Olympiacos signed Tyson Ward from Paris Basketball, Donta Hall from Baskonia Vitoria-Gasteiz and Frank Ntilikina from Partizan Belgrade. Nigel Williams-Goss and Moses Wright joined Žalgiris Kaunas, while Luca Vildoza moved to Virtus Bologna. In January, the Reds brought in Cory Joseph from AS Monaco and Tyrique Jones from Partizan Belgrade, while Saben Lee joined Anadolu Efes Istanbul.

In the EuroLeague, Olympiacos finished first in the regular season for the third time in the last four years. Sasha Vezenkov won his second EuroLeague MVP Award and EuroLeague Top Scorer Trophy, while he and Nikola Milutinov were selected to the All-EuroLeague First Team and Tyler Dorsey to the All-EuroLeague Second Team. In the playoffs, the Reds swept AS Monaco in three games by a total margin of 74 points, setting a new EuroLeague record, and advanced to their fifth consecutive Final Four, once again setting a new club record. In the 2026 Final Four held at the Telekom Center in Athens, home of archrivals Panathinaikos, Olympiacos qualified for the final after beating reigning champions Fenerbahce Istanbul 79–61. There, the Reds faced Real Madrid for the fifth time, the club against which they had won their last title in 2013, but had lost the 1995, 2015 and 2023 finals. Olympiacos went on to defeat Real 92–85 in dramatic fashion, conquering their fourth EuroLeague trophy, also becoming the first club to win the title having finished atop the regular season standings since the competition switched to a single-group format nine years ago. Evan Fournier was named Final Four MVP, the fourth Olympiacos player to do so after Žarko Paspalj, David Rivers and Vassilis Spanoulis, while Alec Peters led the team in points and PIR during the tournament.

In domestic competitions, Olympiacos won the Greek Super Cup for the fourth consecutive year, beating Promitheas Patras 92–83 in the final, but suffered a second consecutive defeat in the Greek Cup final to Panathinaikos 68–79. However, the Reds successfully defended their GBL title, overcoming the Greens with 3–2 wins in the finals, thus celebrating their sixteenth championship and fourth in the last five years. It was the first time since 2012, and the third time overall, that Olympiacos won the EuroLeague and GBL titles in the same season. Fournier was named GBL Finals MVP, doubling his personal accolades for the season.

== Arena ==
SEF's outside view.

In the late 1960s and early 1970s, Olympiacos, like the other Attica-based clubs participating in the Greek Championship, used the few existing indoor halls in Athens as neutral venues, namely those of Leoforos, Sporting, and Glyfada, as well as the open-air Panathenaic Stadium. During the 1972–73 season, Olympiacos moved to the Piraeus Indoor Hall, commonly known as Papastrateio, which was to become their home ground for the next two decades.

In the 1991–92 season, Olympiacos moved to the Peace and Friendship Stadium (Greek: Στάδιο Ειρήνης και Φιλίας), commonly called SEF (Greek: ΣΕΦ), which is a multi-purpose indoor arena located in Neo Faliro, Piraeus, directly opposite the Karaiskakis Stadium, home ground of Olympiacos F.C. Olympiacos moved to the Glyfada Indoor Hall during the 2001–02 season and to the Korydallos Indoor Hall during the 2002–04 seasons, as SEF was closed for renovation for the 2004 Summer Olympics. The arena's current seating capacity for Olympiacos' home games is 12,750.

In July 2025, the Greek government announced an agreement for the concession of SEF's use, management, and exploitation to Olympiacos for a period of 49 years. The club's goal is to convert SEF into a purely basketball arena, with a capacity of 16,000 seats, by the end of 2026. From the start of the 2026-27 season until the completion of the renovation of SEF, Olympiacos will play their home games at SUNEL Arena.

== Roster and depth chart ==
=== Roster ===
Note: Flags indicate the nationality(ies) of the players, not just their national team eligibility. According to FIBA regulations, any player over the age of 17 who has played for a national team in an official FIBA competition cannot play for another national team, save in exceptional cases.

Players
Coaches

Pos.	No.	Nat.	Name	Ht.	Wt.	Age
G	0	(United States) (Bulgaria)	Miller-McIntyre, Codi	1.91 m (6 ft 3 in)	90 kg (198 lb)	32 – 1 June 1994
G/F	3	(United States)	Ward, Tyson	1.98 m (6 ft 6 in)	84 kg (185 lb)	29 – 26 July 1997
PG	4	(Greece)	Bourneles, Giorgos	1.90 m (6 ft 3 in)	85 kg (187 lb)	19 – 4 March 2007
SG	5	(United States) (Greece)	Papas, George	1.96 m (6 ft 5 in)	90 kg (198 lb)	28 – 15 March 1998
G	8	(Dominican Republic)	Montero, Jean (injured)	1.88 m (6 ft 2 in)	80 kg (176 lb)	23 – 3 July 2003
G	9	(Greece)	Plotas, Nikos	1.95 m (6 ft 5 in)		22 – 12 June 2004
F	14	(Bulgaria) (Greece)	Vezenkov, Sasha	2.06 m (6 ft 9 in)	102 kg (225 lb)	31 – 6 August 1995
F	16	(Greece)	Papanikolaou, Kostas (C)	2.03 m (6 ft 8 in)	107 kg (236 lb)	36 – 31 July 1990
G/F	21	(Greece)	Netzipoglou, Omiros	1.95 m (6 ft 5 in)	80 kg (176 lb)	24 – 18 November 2002
SG	22	(United States) (Greece)	Dorsey, Tyler	1.96 m (6 ft 5 in)	83 kg (183 lb)	30 – 18 February 1996
F/C	24	(Senegal)	Ndiaye, Mbaye	2.04 m (6 ft 8 in)	92 kg (203 lb)	27 – 4 January 1999
F/C	29	(Greece)	Karagiannidis, Antonis	2.06 m (6 ft 9 in)	104 kg (229 lb)	24 – 13 April 2002
C	33	(Serbia)	Milutinov, Nikola (injured)	2.12 m (6 ft 11 in)	116 kg (256 lb)	31 – 30 December 1994
G	34	(Canada)	Joseph, Cory	1.88 m (6 ft 2 in)	90 kg (198 lb)	35 – 20 August 1991
C	42	(United States) (Armenia)	Dunston, Bryant	2.03 m (6 ft 8 in)	107 kg (236 lb)	40 – 28 May 1986
C	45	(United States) (Azerbaijan)	Hall, Donta	2.08 m (6 ft 10 in)	105 kg (231 lb)	29 – 7 August 1997
C	88	(United States)	Jones, Tyrique	2.03 m (6 ft 8 in)	107 kg (236 lb)	29 – 3 May 1997
G/F	94	(France)	Fournier, Evan	1.98 m (6 ft 6 in)	93 kg (205 lb)	34 – 29 October 1992

Head coach

- (Greece) Giorgos Bartzokas

Assistant coach(es)

- (Greece) Christos Pappas
- (Greece) Giorgos Bozikas
- (Greece) Stefanos Triantafyllos
- (Greece) Giannis Kalampokis

Strength & conditioning coach(es)

- (Greece) Andreas Gkatzoulis
- (Greece) Dimitris Rozolis

Physician(s)

- (Greece) Theofanis Tsavisis

Team manager

- (Greece) Antonis Katsikis

Legend

- (C) Team captain
- Injured

- Roster
Updated: 16 November 2026

=== EuroLeague depth chart ===
Pos.	Starting 5	Bench 1	Bench 2	Bench 3	Inactive
C	Tyrique Jones	Donta Hall	Bryant Dunston	Antonis Karagiannidis	Nikola Milutinov (injured)
PF	Sasha Vezenkov	Mbaye Ndiaye
SF	Tyson Ward	Kostas Papanikolaou
SG	Evan Fournier	Omiros Netzipoglou		Tyler Dorsey	George Papas (UNR)
PG	Cory Joseph	Codi Miller-McIntyre	Nikos Plotas	Giorgos Bourneles (U20)	Jean Montero (injured)

Note: According to EuroLeague regulations, the maximum number of players who can be simultaneously registered to a team is 16, excluding those under the age of 20 and those who are inactive due to injury. (UNR) indicates an unregistered player and (U20) a player under the age of 20.

=== GBL depth chart ===
Pos.	Starting 5	Bench 1	Bench 2	Bench 3	Inactive
C	Donta Hall*	Antonis Karagiannidis		Tyrique Jones*	Nikola Milutinov* (injured); Bryant Dunston* (UNR)
PF	Sasha Vezenkov	Mbaye Ndiaye*
SF	Tyson Ward*	Kostas Papanikolaou
SG	Omiros Netzipoglou	Evan Fournier*	George Papas	Tyler Dorsey
PG	Codi Miller-McIntyre*	Cory Joseph*	Nikos Plotas	Giorgos Bourneles	Jean Montero* (UNR) (injured)

Note: According to GBL regulations, the maximum number of foreign players who can be simultaneously registered to a team is 8, while up to 6 can participate in each game. Players holding Greek citizenship are not considered foreign, regardless of which national team they are eligible to represent. Foreign players are shown with an asterisk (*) and (UNR) indicates an unregistered player.

=== Roster changes for the 2026–27 season ===
In

Date	Player	Pos.	Age	Nat.	Status	Moving from		Ref.
	Giorgos Tanoulis	C	23	(Greece)	End of loan	Aris Thessaloniki	(Greece)	
	Kostas Antetokounmpo	C	28	(Nigeria) (Greece)	End of loan	Aris Thessaloniki	(Greece)	
	Antonis Karagiannidis	C	24	(Greece)	End of loan	Promitheas Patras	(Greece)	
2 July 2026	Codi Miller-McIntyre	PG	32	(United States) (Bulgaria)	Free agent	Red Star Belgrade	(Serbia)	
8 July 2026	Jean Montero	PG	23	(Dominican Republic)	Buyout	Valencia Basket	(Spain)	
13 August 2026	Mbaye Ndiaye	PF	27	(Senegal)	Buyout	ASVEL Basket	(France)	
20 August 2026	Nikos Plotas	PG	22	(Greece)	Buyout	Promitheas Patras	(Greece)	
28 September 2026	George Papas	SG	28	(United States) (Greece)	Free agent	Maroussi Athens	(Greece)	
28 September 2026	Bryant Dunston	C	40	(United States) (Armenia)	Free agent	Olimpia Milano	(Italy)	
22 October 2026	John Konchar	SF	30	(United States)	Free agent	New York Knicks	(United States)	

Out

Date	Player	Pos.	Age	Nat.	Status	Moving to		Ref.
16 June 2026	Alec Peters	PF	31	(United States)	Free agent	Olimpia Milano	(Italy)	
19 June 2026	Giorgos Tanoulis	C	23	(Greece)	Free agent	Aris Thessaloniki	(Greece)	
20 June 2026	Moustapha Fall	C	34	(France)	Free agent	Panathinaikos Athens	(Greece)	
22 June 2026	Frank Ntilikina	PG	27	(Rwanda) (France)	Free agent	Paris Basketball	(France)	
25 June 2026	Shaquielle McKissic	SF	35	(United States) (Azerbaijan)	Free agent	Türk Telekom Ankara	(Turkey)	
27 June 2026	Kostas Antetokounmpo	C	28	(Nigeria) (Greece)	Free agent	Aris Thessaloniki	(Greece)	
2 July 2026	Monté Morris	PG	31	(United States)	Free agent			
9 July 2026	Keenan Evans	PG	29	(United States)	Free agent	Žalgiris Kaunas	(Lithuania)	
7 September 2026	Thomas Walkup	PG	33	(United States) (Greece)	Buyout	Dubai Basketball	(United Arab Emirates)	
9 September 2026	Giannoulis Larentzakis	SG	32	(Greece)	Free agent	AEK Athens	(Greece)	
16 November 2026	John Konchar	SF	30	(United States)	Free agent			

== Notable players ==
=== Retired jersey numbers ===
No.	Player	Pos.	Nat.	Tenure	Date	Ref.
7	Vassilis Spanoulis	CG	(Greece)	2010–2021	17 September 2023	
15	Giorgos Printezis	PF	(Greece)	2000–2006, 2007–2009, 2011–2022	6 September 2024	

=== Team captains ===
Kostas Papanikolaou

Years	Player	Nat.	Ref.
1967–1974	Makis Katsafados	(Greece)	
1974–1984	Steve Giatzoglou	(Greece)	
1984–1986	Andreas Kozakis	(Cyprus)	
1986–1988	Giannis Paragios	(Greece)	
1988–1995	Argyris Kampouris	(Greece)	
1995–1997	Giorgos Sigalas	(Greece)	
1997–2005	Milan Tomić	(Federal Republic of Yugoslavia) (Greece)	

Years	Player	Nat.	Ref.
2005–2006	Nikos Chatzis	(Greece)	
2006–2008	Manolis Papamakarios	(Greece)	
2008–2011	Thodoris Papaloukas	(Greece)	
2011–2021	Vassilis Spanoulis	(Greece)	
2021–2022	Giorgos Printezis	(Greece)	
2022–present	Kostas Papanikolaou	(Greece)	

=== Other selected players ===
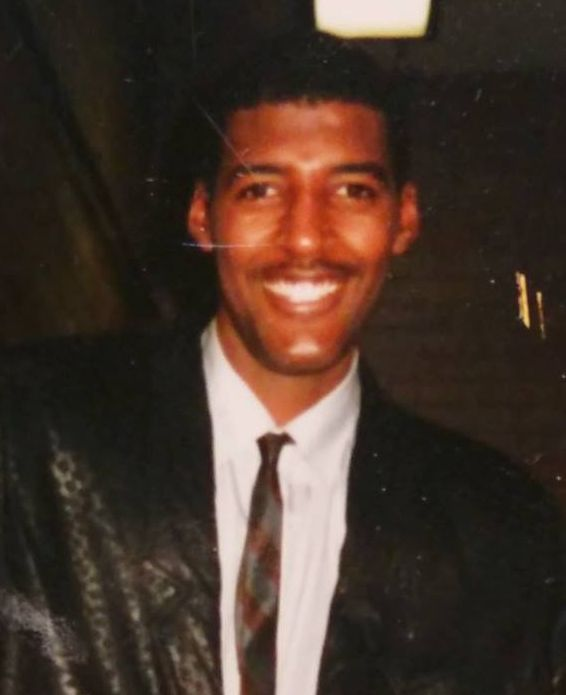
Roy Tarpley

Giorgos Sigalas

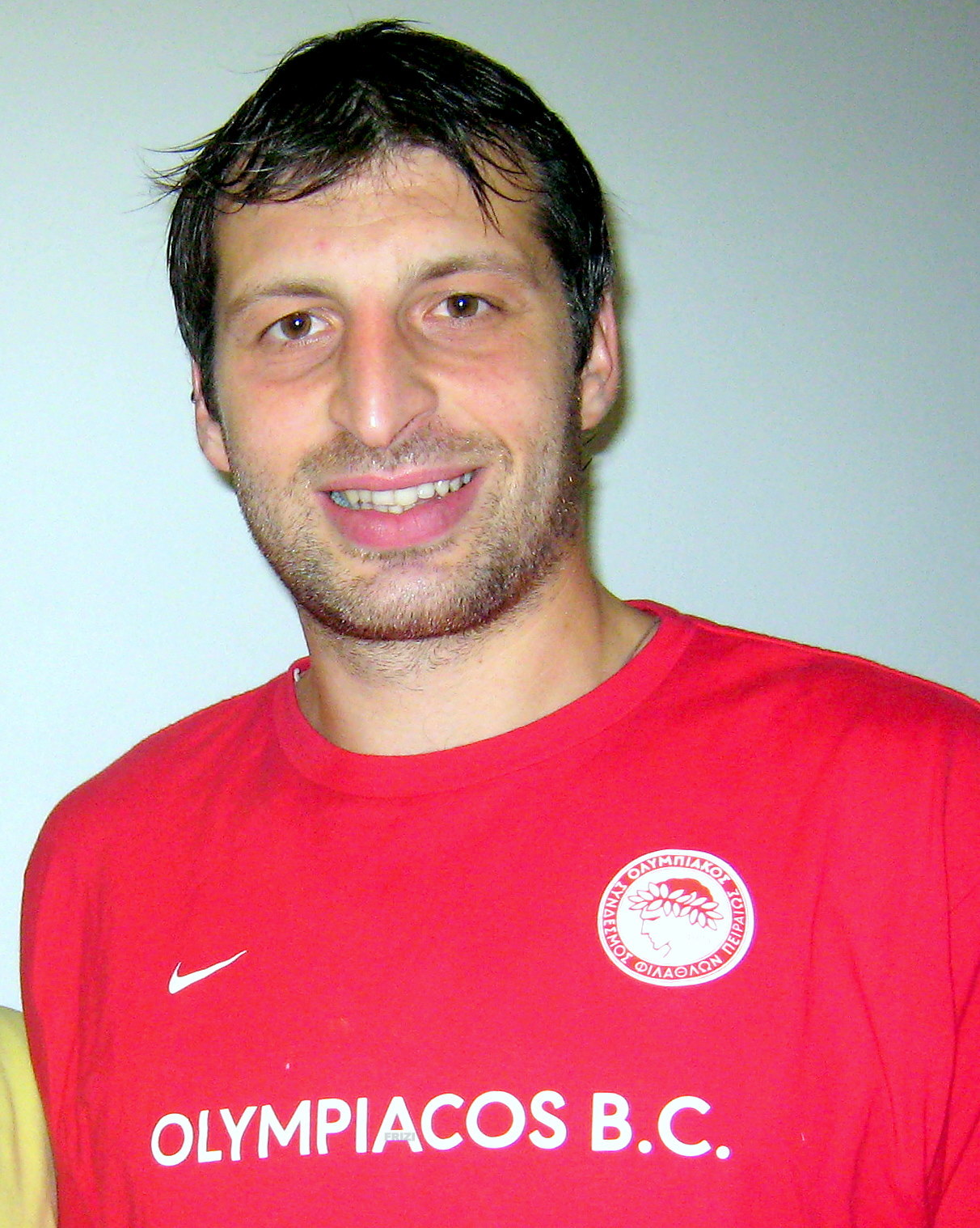
Thodoris Papaloukas

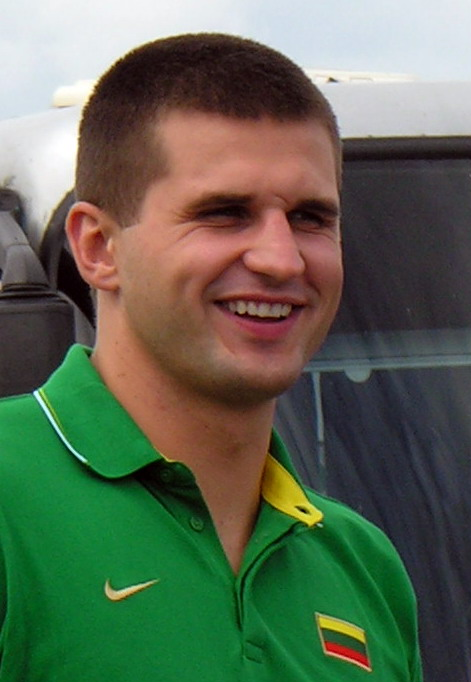
Linas Kleiza

Kyle Hines

Alec Peters

Note: Flags indicate national team eligibility at FIBA-sanctioned events. Players may hold other non-FIBA nationalities not displayed.

Criteria

To appear in this section a player must have either:

- Set a club record or won an individual award while at the club
- Played at least one official international match for their national team at any time
- Played at least one official NBA match at any time.

- (Argentina) Fabricio Oberto
- (Argentina) Luca Vildoza
- (Argentina) Rubén Wolkowyski
- (Armenia) Bryant Dunston
- (Australia) Mark Bradtke
- (Australia) Matt Nielsen
- (Azerbaijan) Donta Hall
- (Azerbaijan) Zach LeDay
- (Belgium) Matt Lojeski
- (Bosnia and Herzegovina) Henry Domercant
- (Bosnia and Herzegovina) Nenad Marković
- (Bosnia and Herzegovina) Elvir Ovčina
- (Bulgaria) Roderick Blakney
- (Bulgaria) Codi Miller-McIntyre
- (Bulgaria) Cedric Simmons
- (Bulgaria) Sasha Vezenkov
- (Cameroon) D.J. Strawberry
- (Canada) Khem Birch
- (Canada) Cory Joseph
- (Canada) Kyle Wiltjer
- (Croatia) Dalibor Bagarić
- (Croatia) Arijan Komazec
- (Croatia) Oliver Lafayette
- (Croatia) Veljko Mršić
- (Croatia) Damir Mulaomerović
- (Croatia) Dino Radja
- (Croatia) Nikola Vujčić
- (Croatia) Andrija Žižić
- (Dominican Republic) Jean Montero
- (France) Moustapha Fall
- (France) Evan Fournier
- (France) Frank Ntilikina
- (France) Stéphane Risacher
- (France) Kim Tillie
- (France) Axel Toupane
- (Georgia (country)) Giorgi Shermadini
- (Germany) Patrick Femerling
- (Germany) Misan Haldin
- (Germany) Chris Welp
- (Ghana) Nathan Mensah
- (Greece) Dimitris Agravanis
- (Greece) Kostas Antetokounmpo
- (Greece) Giannis Athinaiou
- (Greece) Efthymis Bakatsias
- (Greece) Giorgos Barlas
- (Greece) Giorgos Bogris
- (Greece) Nikos Boudouris
- (Greece) Giannis Bourousis
- (Greece) Vassilis Charalampopoulos
- (Greece) Christos Charissis
- (Greece) Nikos Chatzis
- (Greece) Pavlos Diakoulas
- (Greece) Giorgos Diamantopoulos
- (Greece) Tyler Dorsey
- (Greece) Panagiotis Fasoulas
- (Greece) Nasos Galakteros
- (Greece) Charis Giannopoulos
- (Greece) Steve Giatzoglou
- (Greece) Andreas Glyniadakis
- (Greece) Christos Iordanidis
- (Greece) Giannis Kalampokis
- (Greece) Argyris Kampouris
- (Greece) Antonis Karagiannidis
- (Greece) Panagiotis Karatzas
- (Greece) Giorgos Kastrinakis
- (Greece) Makis Katsafados
- (Greece) Dimitris Katsivelis
- (Greece) Vassilis Kavvadas
- (Greece) Antonis Koniaris
- (Greece) Angelos Koronios
- (Greece) Kosta Koufos
- (Greece) Giannoulis Larentzakis
- (Greece) Panagiotis Liadelis
- (Greece) Michalis Lountzis
- (Greece) Vangelis Mantzaris
- (Greece) Dimitris Mavroeidis
- (Greece) Loukas Mavrokefalidis
- (Greece) Naz Mitrou-Long
- (Greece) Vassilis Mouratos
- (Greece) Omiros Netzipoglou
- (Greece) Nikos Oikonomou
- (Greece) George Papadakos
- (Greece) Lazaros Papadopoulos
- (Greece) Thodoris Papaloukas
- (Greece) Dimitris Papanikolaou
- (Greece) Kostas Papanikolaou
- (Greece) Ioannis Papapetrou
- (Greece) George Papas
- (Greece) Giannis Paragios
- (Greece) Michalis Pelekanos
- (Greece) Stratos Perperoglou
- (Greece) Giorgos Printezis
- (Greece) Aris Raftopoulos
- (Greece) Sofoklis Schortsanitis
- (Greece) Giorgos Sigalas
- (Greece) Nikos Sismanidis
- (Greece) Kostas Sloukas
- (Greece) Tolis Spanos
- (Greece) Alekos Spanoudakis
- (Greece) Ioannis Spanoudakis
- (Greece) Vassilis Spanoulis
- (Greece) Georgios Tanoulis
- (Greece) Vassilis Toliopoulos
- (Greece) Michalis Tsairelis
- (Greece) Jake Tsakalidis
- (Greece) Kostas Vasileiadis
- (Greece) Panagiotis Vasilopoulos
- (Greece) Ian Vougioukas
- (Greece) Thomas Walkup
- (Hungary) Róbert Gulyás
- (Israel) Yotam Halperin
- (Italy) Daniel Hackett
- (Latvia) Jānis Strēlnieks
- (Latvia) Jānis Timma
- (Lebanon) Matt Freije
- (Lebanon) Sam Hoskin
- (Lithuania) Ignas Brazdeikis
- (Lithuania) Martynas Gecevičius
- (Lithuania) Artūras Karnišovas
- (Lithuania) Linas Kleiza
- (Lithuania) Mindaugas Kuzminskas
- (Lithuania) Arvydas Macijauskas
- (Lithuania) Renaldas Seibutis
- (Lithuania) Eurelijus Žukauskas
- (Montenegro) Taylor Rochestie
- (North Macedonia) Pero Antić
- (North Macedonia) Ethan Happ
- (North Macedonia) Ryan Stack
- (North Macedonia) Vrbica Stefanov
- (North Macedonia) Moses Wright
- (Poland) Jeff Nordgaard
- (Russia) Joel Bolomboy
- (Russia) Aleksey Savrasenko
- (Senegal) Mbaye Ndiaye
- (Serbia) Zoran Erceg
- (Serbia) Marko Kešelj
- (Serbia) Nikola Milutinov
- (Serbia) Filip Petrušev
- (Serbia) Aleksej Pokuševski
- (Serbia) Miloš Teodosić
- (Slovenia) Mirza Begić
- (Slovenia) Boris Gorenc
- (Slovenia) Goran Jurak
- (Slovenia) Ivica Jurković
- (Slovenia) Rašho Nesterović
- (Spain) Iñaki de Miguel
- (Spain) Juan Antonio Morales
- (Spain) Johnny Rogers
- (Ukraine) Sasha Volkov
- (United States) Alex Acker
- (United States) Quincy Acy
- (United States) Willie Anderson
- (United States) Wade Baldwin
- (United States) Walter Berry
- (United States) Patrick Beverley
- (United States) Tarik Black
- (United States) Bobby Brown
- (United States) Dwight Buycks
- (United States) Isaiah Canaan
- (United States) Will Cherry
- (United States) Josh Childress
- (United States) Mardy Collins
- (United States) Joey Dorsey
- (United States) Tyus Edney
- (United States) Blue Edwards
- (United States) Maurice Evans
- (United States) Alphonso Ford
- (United States) Anthony Goldwire
- (United States) Josh Grant
- (United States) Erick Green
- (United States) Lynn Greer
- (United States) Aaron Harrison
- (United States) Michael Hawkins
- (United States) Rod Higgins
- (United States) Kyle Hines
- (United States) Othello Hunter
- (United States) Marc Jackson
- (United States) Charles Jenkins
- (United States) DeMarco Johnson
- (United States) Eddie Johnson
- (United States) Darius Johnson-Odom
- (United States) John Konchar
- (United States) Acie Law
- (United States) Saben Lee
- (United States) Quincy Lewis
- (United States) Kalin Lucas
- (United States) Roger Mason Jr.
- (United States) Todd Mitchell
- (United States) Jamario Moon
- (United States) Chris Morris
- (United States) Monté Morris
- (United States) Jannero Pargo
- (United States) Brandon Paul
- (United States) Alec Peters
- (United States) Lavor Postell
- (United States) Josh Powell
- (United States) Willie Reed
- (United States) David Rivers
- (United States) Brian Roberts
- (United States) James Robinson
- (United States) Carey Scurry
- (United States) Roy Tarpley
- (United States) Hollis Thompson
- (United States) Von Wafer
- (United States) Hakim Warrick
- (United States) Briante Weber
- (United States) Nigel Williams-Goss
- (United States) Qyntel Woods
- (United States) Charlie Yelverton
- (Federal Republic of Yugoslavia) Žarko Paspalj
- (Federal Republic of Yugoslavia) Dragan Tarlać
- (Federal Republic of Yugoslavia) Milan Tomić
- (Federal Republic of Yugoslavia) Dušan Vukčević

== Head coaches ==
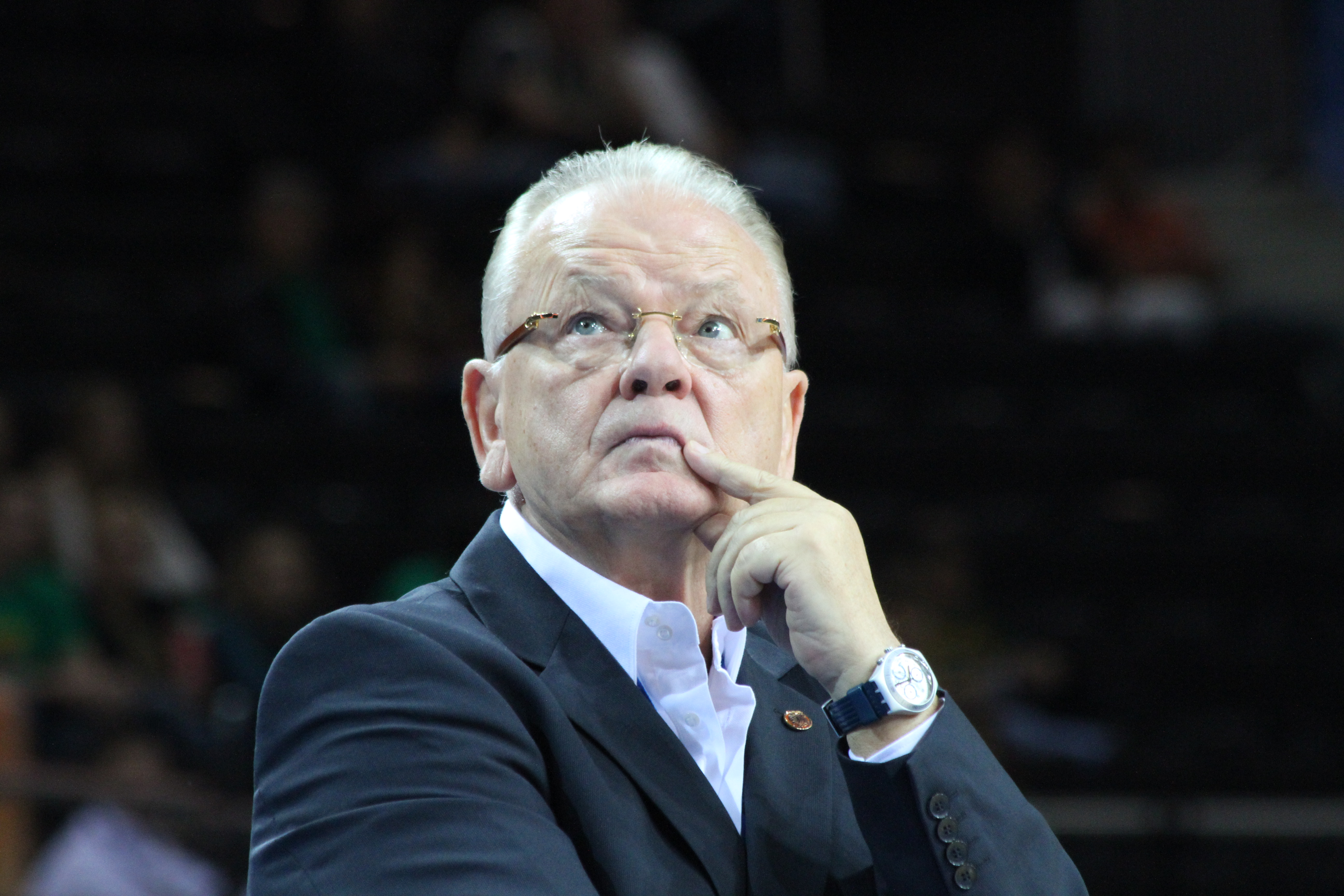
Dušan Ivković

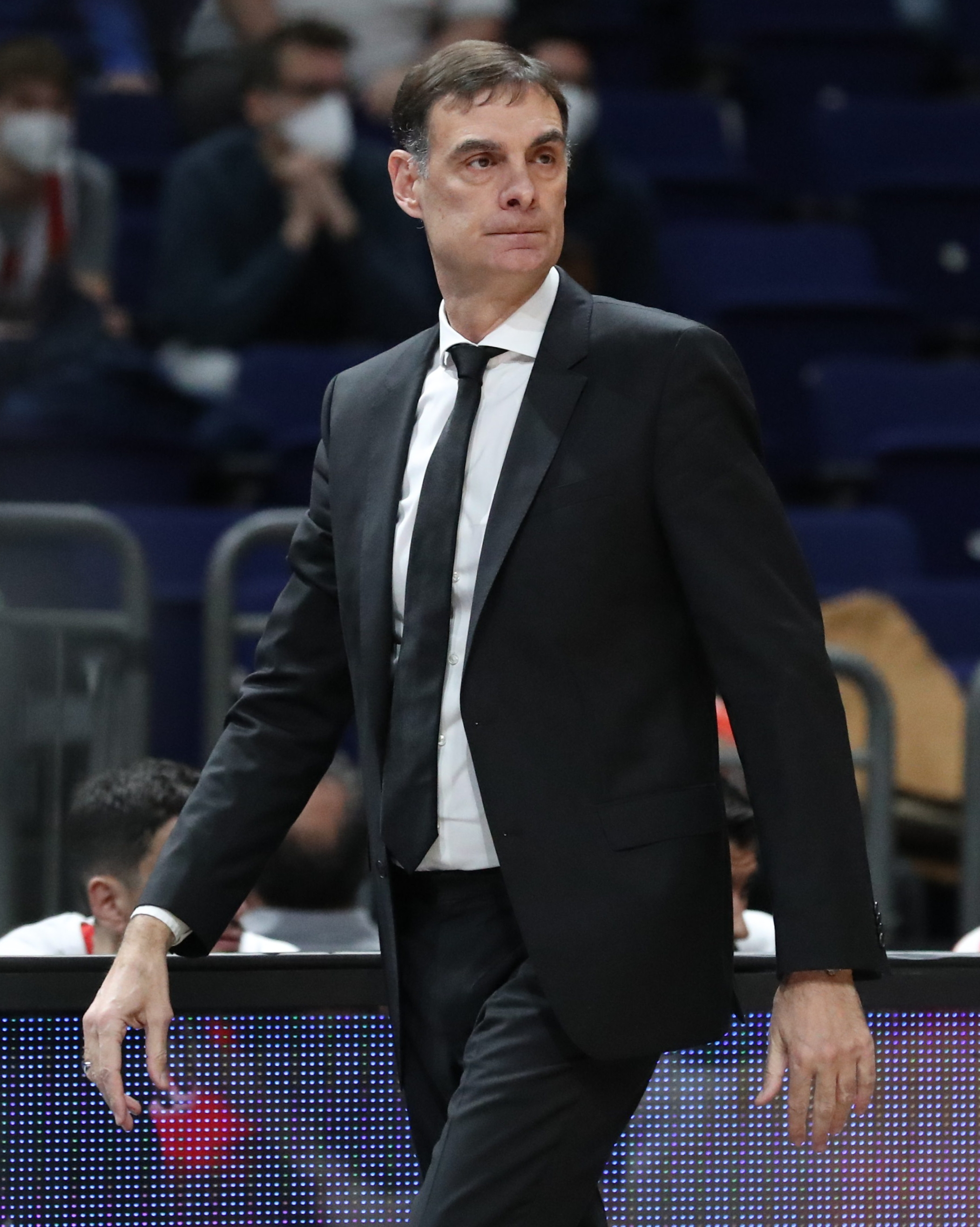
Giorgos Bartzokas

- (Greece) Ioannis Spanoudakis (1948–65)
- (Greece) Themis Cholevas (1966)
- (Greece) Alekos Spanoudakis (1966)
- (Greece) Faidon Matthaiou (1967–70)
- (Greece) Nikos Milas (1970–71)
- (Greece) Faidon Matthaiou (1971–73)
- (Greece) Vangelis Sevdinoglou (1973–74)
- (Greece) Faidon Matthaiou (1974–76)
- (Greece) Themis Cholevas (1976)
- (Greece) Kostas Mourouzis (1976–80)
- (Greece) Giorgos Barlas (1980)
- (Greece) Faidon Matthaiou (1980–81)
- (Greece) Michalis Kyritsis (1981–82)
- (Greece) Thymios Filippou (1982)
- (Greece) Kostas Anastasatos (1982–83)
- (Greece) Giorgos Barlas (1983)
- (Greece) Thymios Filippou (1983–84)
- (Greece) Faidon Matthaiou (1984–85)
- (Greece) Kostas Anastasatos (1985–86)
- (Greece) (United States) Steve Giatzoglou (1986–89)
- (Greece) Makis Dendrinos (1989–90)
- (Greece) Michalis Kyritsis (1990–91)
- (Greece) Thanasis Rammos (1991)
- (Greece) Giannis Ioannidis (1991–96)
- (Federal Republic of Yugoslavia) Dušan Ivković (1996–99)
- (Greece) Giannis Ioannidis (1999–00)
- (Greece) Ilias Zouros (2000–02)
- (Slovenia) (Greece) Slobodan Subotić (2002–03)
- (Federal Republic of Yugoslavia) (Greece) Dragan Šakota (2003–04)
- (Federal Republic of Yugoslavia) (Greece) Milan Tomić (2004)
- (Federal Republic of Yugoslavia) Milan Minić (2004)
- (Lithuania) Jonas Kazlauskas (2004–06)
- (Israel) Pini Gershon (2006–08)
- (Greece) Panagiotis Giannakis (2008–10)
- (Serbia) Dušan Ivković (2010–12)
- (Greece) Giorgos Bartzokas (2012–14)
- (Greece) Giannis Sfairopoulos (2014–18)
- (United States) (Israel) David Blatt (2018–2019)
- (Lithuania) Kęstutis Kemzūra (2019–2020)
- (Greece) Giorgos Bartzokas (2020–present)

== Honours and other achievements ==
Honours
Type	Competition	Titles	Seasons
International	EuroLeague	4	1996–97, 2011–12, 2012–13, 2025–26
International	FIBA Intercontinental Cup	1	2013
Domestic	Greek League	16	1948–49, 1959–60, 1975–76, 1977–78, 1992–93, 1993–94, 1994–95, 1995–96, 1996–97, 2011–12, 2014–15, 2015–16, 2021–22, 2022–23, 2024–25, 2025–26
Domestic	Greek Cup	12	1975–76, 1976–77, 1977–78, 1979–80, 1993–94, 1996–97, 2001–02, 2009–10, 2010–11, 2021–22, 2022–23, 2023–24
Domestic	Greek Super Cup	5	2022, 2023, 2024, 2025, 2026

- Record title holders

=== Other achievements ===
==== Doubles and trebles ====
- Triple Crown
  - Season (1): 1996–97
- Continental double
  - Seasons (3): 1996–97, 2011–12, 2025–26
- Domestic treble
  - Season (1): 2022–23
- Domestic double
  - Seasons (6): 1975–76, 1977–78, 1993–94, 1996–97, 2021–22, 2022–23

==== International competitions ====
- EuroLeague
  - Runners-up (6): 1993–94, 1994–95, 2009–10, 2014–15, 2016–17, 2022–23
  - Third place (3): 1998–99, 2023–24, 2024–25
  - Final Four (15): 1994, 1995, 1997, 1999, 2009, 2010, 2012, 2013, 2015, 2017, 2022, 2023, 2024, 2025, 2026
- McDonald's Championship
  - Runners-up (1): 1997
- EuroLeague SuperCup
  - Runners-up (1): 2026

==== Domestic competitions ====
- Greek League
  - Runners-up (24): 1956–57, 1971–72, 1972–73, 1974–75, 1976–77, 1978–79, 1979–80, 1980–81, 1985–86, 1991–92, 1998–99, 2000–01, 2001–02, 2005–06, 2006–07, 2007–08, 2008–09, 2009–10, 2010–11, 2012–13, 2013–14, 2016–17, 2017–18, 2023–24
- Greek Cup
  - Runners-up (11): 1978–79, 1982–83, 1985–86, 2003–04, 2007–08, 2008–09, 2011–12, 2012–13, 2017–18, 2024–25, 2025–26

== Individual awards ==
FIBA Hall of Fame

- Panagiotis Fasoulas
- Dušan Ivković
- Fabricio Oberto
- Sasha Volkov

FIBA Hall of Fame Candidates

- Žarko Paspalj
- Artūras Karnišovas
- Arvydas Macijauskas
- Dino Rađja
- David Blatt

FIBA's 50 Greatest Players

- Dino Rađja
- Sasha Volkov

50 Greatest EuroLeague Contributors

- Pini Gershon
- Dušan Ivković
- Thodoris Papaloukas
- Dino Rađja

EuroLeague Basketball Legend Award

- Thodoris Papaloukas
- Dušan Ivković
- Vassilis Spanoulis
- Nikola Vujčić

EuroLeague 2001–10 All-Decade Team

- Thodoris Papaloukas
- Nikola Vujčić

EuroLeague 2010–20 All-Decade Team

- Vassilis Spanoulis
- Giorgos Printezis
- Miloš Teodosić
- Kyle Hines

EuroLeague Coach of the Year Award

- Dušan Ivković (2011–12)
- Giorgos Bartzokas (2012–13, 2021–22, 2022–23)

All-Europe Player of the Year

- Vassilis Spanoulis (2012, 2013)

FIBA Europe Player of the Year Award

- Miloš Teodosić (2010)

Vatican's Giuseppe Sciacca World Athlete Award

- Vassilis Spanoulis (2013)

EuroLeague MVP

- Miloš Teodosić (2009–10)
- Vassilis Spanoulis (2012–13)
- Sasha Vezenkov (2022–23, 2025–26)

EuroLeague Final Four MVP

- Žarko Paspalj (1994)
- David Rivers (1997)
- Vassilis Spanoulis (2012, 2013)
- Evan Fournier (2026)

EuroLeague Playoffs MVP

- Sasha Vezenkov (2025)

All-EuroLeague First Team

- Ioannis Bourousis (2008–09)
- Linas Kleiza (2009–10)
- Miloš Teodosić (2009–10)
- Vassilis Spanoulis (2011–12, 2012–13, 2014–15)
- Giorgos Printezis (2016–17)
- Sasha Vezenkov (2021–22, 2022–23, 2024–25, 2025–26)
- Nikola Milutinov (2025–26)

All-EuroLeague Second Team

- Alphonso Ford (2001–02)
- Thodoris Papaloukas (2008–09)
- Josh Childress (2009–10)
- Vassilis Spanoulis (2010–11, 2013–14, 2017–18)
- Kostas Sloukas (2021–22)
- Evan Fournier (2024–25)
- Tyler Dorsey (2025–26)

Alphonso Ford EuroLeague Top Scorer Trophy

- Alphonso Ford (2001–02)
- Linas Kleiza (2009–10)
- Sasha Vezenkov (2022–23, 2025–26)

EuroLeague Best Defender

- Bryant Dunston (2013–14, 2014–15)
- Thomas Walkup (2023–24)

EuroLeague Rising Star

- Kostas Papanikolaou (2012–13)

EuroLeague Championship Game Top Scorer

- David Rivers (1997)
- Kostas Papanikolaou (2012)
- Vassilis Spanoulis (2013)
- Matt Lojeski (2015)
- Sasha Vezenkov (2023)

EuroLeague Executive of the Year

- Panagiotis Angelopoulos (2011–12)
- Giorgos Angelopoulos (2011–12)

Greek League MVP

- Panagiotis Fasoulas (1993–94, 1994–95)
- Giorgos Sigalas (1995–96)
- David Rivers (1996–97)
- Vassilis Spanoulis (2011–12, 2015–16)
- Sasha Vezenkov (2021–22, 2022–23, 2024–25)
- Evan Fournier (2025–26)

Greek League Finals MVP

- Giorgos Sigalas (1993, 1994, 1995, 1996, 1997)
- Giorgos Printezis (2012, 2015)
- Vassilis Spanoulis (2016)
- Sasha Vezenkov (2022, 2025)
- Thomas Walkup (2023)
- Evan Fournier (2026)

All-Greek League Team

- Sofoklis Schortsanitis (2005–06)
- Panagiotis Vasilopoulos (2006–07)
- Ioannis Bourousis (2007–08, 2008–09, 2010–11)
- Josh Childress (2009–10)
- Vassilis Spanoulis (2010–11, 2011–12, 2012–13, 2014–15, 2015–16, 2016–17)
- Giorgos Printezis (2011–12, 2013–14, 2014–15, 2015–16, 2016–17)
- Kostas Papanikolaou (2011–12, 2012–13, 2016–17, 2022–23, 2023–24)
- Kostas Sloukas (2014–15, 2021–22, 2022–23)
- Nikola Milutinov (2017–18, 2018–19, 2024–25, 2025–26)
- Sasha Vezenkov (2021–22, 2022–23, 2024–25, 2025–26)
- Moustapha Fall (2022–23)
- Alec Peters (2023–24)
- Evan Fournier (2024–25, 2025–26)
- Tyler Dorsey (2025–26)

Greek League Coach of the Year

- Dušan Ivković (1996–97, 2011–12)
- Ioannis Sfairopoulos (2014–15)
- Giorgos Bartzokas (2022–23, 2025–26)

Greek League Top Scorer

- Žarko Paspalj (1991–92)
- Josh Childress (2009–10)
- Sasha Vezenkov (2024–25)

Greek League PIR leader

- Dino Rađja (2000–01)
- Josh Childress (2009–10)
- Sasha Vezenkov (2021–22, 2022–23, 2024–25)
- Alec Peters (2023–24)

Greek League Top Rebounder

- Dino Rađja (2000–01)

Greek League Assist Leader

- Thodoris Papaloukas (2008–09)
- Vassilis Spanoulis (2011–12, 2012–13, 2014–15)

Greek League Defensive Player of the Year

- Josh Childress (2009–10)
- Joey Dorsey (2011–12)
- Bryant Dunston (2014–15)
- Thomas Walkup (2021–22, 2022–23, 2025–26)

Greek League Best Young Player

- Kostas Papanikolaou (2011–12)
- Ioannis Papapetrou (2015–16)

Greek Cup Finals MVP

- David Rivers (1996–97)
- Alphonso Ford (2001–02)
- Miloš Teodosić (2009–10, 2010–11)
- Tyler Dorsey (2021–22)
- Sasha Vezenkov (2022–23)
- Moustapha Fall (2023–24)

== Season by season ==
=== Rankings and personnel ===
Seasons	Domestic League	Domestic Cups	European Competitions	Head Coach	Roster
1946–47	3rd place				Petros Dimitropoulos, Xenophon Nikolaidis, Alexandros Koutsoukos, Emmanouil Chatzinikolaou, Anagnostopoulos, Michopoulos
1947–48					Ioannis Spanoudakis, Alekos Spanoudakis, Alexandros Koutsoukos, Emmanouil Chatzinikolaou, Petros Dimitropoulos, Xenophon Nikolaidis,
1948–49	Champions			Ioannis Spanoudakis	Ioannis Spanoudakis, Alekos Spanoudakis, Alexandros Koutsoukos, Emmanouil Chatzinikolaou, Stylianos Tsikatos, Babis Gerakarakis, Alekos Sidiropoulos, Fotis Gounopoulos, Sinopoulos, Arkoudeas
1949–50	3rd place			Ioannis Spanoudakis	Ioannis Spanoudakis, Alekos Spanoudakis, Alexandros Koutsoukos, Emmanouil Chatzinikolaou, Babis Gerakarakis, Alekos Sidiropoulos, Fotis Gounopoulos, Sinopoulos, Arkoudeas
1950–51	3rd place			Ioannis Spanoudakis	Ioannis Spanoudakis, Alekos Spanoudakis, Alexandros Koutsoukos, Babis Gerakarakis, Alekos Sidiropoulos, Fotis Gounopoulos, Sinopoulos, Arkoudeas
1951–52				Ioannis Spanoudakis	Ioannis Spanoudakis, Alekos Spanoudakis, Alexandros Koutsoukos, Babis Gerakarakis, Alekos Sidiropoulos, Fotis Gounopoulos, Sinopoulos, Arkoudeas
1952–53	3rd place			Ioannis Spanoudakis	Ioannis Spanoudakis, Alekos Spanoudakis, Alexandros Koutsoukos, Babis Gerakarakis, Alekos Sidiropoulos, Fotis Gounopoulos, Sinopoulos, Arkoudeas
1953–54	3rd place			Ioannis Spanoudakis	Ioannis Spanoudakis, Alekos Spanoudakis, Alexandros Koutsoukos, Babis Gerakarakis, Alekos Sidiropoulos, Fotis Gounopoulos, Evangelos Papaioannou, Sinopoulos
1954–55	3rd place			Ioannis Spanoudakis	Ioannis Spanoudakis, Alekos Spanoudakis, Babis Gerakarakis, Fotis Gounopoulos, Evangelos Papaioannou, Theodoros Vamvakousis, Mimis Douratsos, Takis Argyropoulos, Sinopoulos
1955–56				Ioannis Spanoudakis	Ioannis Spanoudakis, Alekos Spanoudakis, Babis Gerakarakis, Evangelos Papaioannou, Theodoros Vamvakousis, Mimis Douratsos, Takis Argyropoulos
1956–57	Runners-up			Ioannis Spanoudakis	Ioannis Spanoudakis, Alekos Spanoudakis, Babis Gerakarakis, Evangelos Papaioannou, Theodoros Vamvakousis, Mimis Douratsos, Takis Argyropoulos, Takis Bisilas
1957–58	6th place		Didn't participate	Ioannis Spanoudakis	Ioannis Spanoudakis, Alekos Spanoudakis, Babis Gerakarakis, Evangelos Papaioannou, Theodoros Vamvakousis, Mimis Douratsos, Takis Argyropoulos, Takis Bisilas
1958–59	4th place		Didn't participate	Ioannis Spanoudakis	Ioannis Spanoudakis, Alekos Spanoudakis, Babis Gerakarakis, Theodoros Vamvakousis, Mimis Douratsos, Takis Argyropoulos, Giannis Polychroniou
1959–60	Champions		Didn't participate	Ioannis Spanoudakis	Ioannis Spanoudakis, Alekos Spanoudakis, Babis Gerakarakis, Theodoros Vamvakousis, Mimis Douratsos, Takis Argyropoulos, Giannis Polychroniou, Vasilis Fasilis, Markos Kaloudis, Nikos Nikolaidis, Manolis Kazanidis, Spanos
1960–61	Didn't participate		Champions Cup; Last 24	Ioannis Spanoudakis	Ioannis Spanoudakis, Alekos Spanoudakis, Theodoros Vamvakousis, Mimis Douratsos, Takis Argyropoulos, Giannis Polychroniou, Vasilis Fasilis, Markos Kaloudis, Nikos Nikolaidis, Manolis Kazanidis, Nikos Kampouropoulos, Giannis Meimaris, Tasos Perdikaris
1961–62	Didn't participate		Didn't participate	Ioannis Spanoudakis	Ioannis Spanoudakis, Alekos Spanoudakis, Theodoros Vamvakousis, Markos Kaloudis, Nikos Nikolaidis, Makis Katsafados
1962–63	Didn't participate		Didn't participate	Ioannis Spanoudakis	Ioannis Spanoudakis, Alekos Spanoudakis, Theodoros Vamvakousis, Markos Kaloudis, Nikos Nikolaidis, Makis Katsafados
1963–64	10th place		Didn't participate	Giannis Koutsoulentis, Ioannis Spanoudakis	Ioannis Spanoudakis, Alekos Spanoudakis, Theodoros Vamvakousis, Markos Kaloudis, Nikos Nikolaidis, Makis Katsafados, Stavros Katsafados, Aris Giokas, Dimitris Kontogiannis, Manolis Arapis, Petros Polykandriotis, Giorgos Maltidis, Nasos Chlelmis, Kostas Perdikaris
1966–67	Didn't participate		Didn't participate	Faidon Matthaiou	Thanasis Rammos, Makis Katsafados, Dimitris Psyllas, Altin Speerman, Ilias Gavas, Steve Pleropoulos, Stavros Katsafados, Giannis Papaiosif, Markos Kaloudis, Petros Polykandriotis, Giorgos Maltidis
1967–68	4th place		Didn't participate	Faidon Matthaiou	Thanasis Rammos, Tolis Spanos, Manolis Efstratiou, Makis Katsafados, Stelios Amerikanos, Dimitris Psyllas, Thanasis Papanagnos, Giannis Papaiosif, Stavros Katsafados, Petros Polykandriotis, Ilias Gavas, Markos Kaloudis, Dimitris Symeonidis, Steve Pleropoulos, Giorgos Maltidis
1968–69	5th place		Didn't participate	Faidon Matthaiou	Tolis Spanos, Thanasis Rammos, Manolis Efstratiou, Makis Katsafados, Stelios Amerikanos, Thanasis Papanagnos, Stavros Katsafados, Petros Polykandriotis, Markos Kaloudis, Giannis Papaiosif, Dimitris Symeonidis
1969–70	5th place		Didn't participate	Faidon Matthaiou	Tolis Spanos, Makis Katsafados, Thanasis Rammos, Stelios Amerikanos, Manolis Efstratiou, Stavros Katsafados, Thanasis Papanagnos, Petros Polykandriotis, Giannis Papaiosif, Markos Kaloudis
1970–71	3rd place		Didn't participate	Nikos Milas	Makis Katsafados, Tolis Spanos, Thanasis Rammos, Manolis Efstratiou, Stelios Amerikanos, Giannis Papaiosif, Jim Rettos, Stavros Katsafados, Petros Polykandriotis, Thanasis Papanagnos
1971–72	Runners-up		Didn't participate	Faidon Matthaiou	Makis Katsafados, Tolis Spanos, Thanasis Rammos, Manolis Efstratiou, Stelios Amerikanos, Steve Giatzoglou, Jim Machairas, Jim Rettos, Stavros Katsafados, Petros Polykandriotis
1972–73	Runners-up		Cup Winners Cup; Last 12	Faidon Matthaiou	Steve Giatzoglou, Makis Katsafados, Giorgos Kastrinakis, Thanasis Rammos, Pavlos Diakoulas, Manolis Efstratiou, Jim Machairas, Giorgos Chalatsiadis, Stelios Amerikanos, Tolis Spanos, Stavros Katsafados
1973–74	6th place		Cup Winners Cup; Last 12	Vangelis Sevdinoglou	Steve Giatzoglou, Giorgos Kastrinakis, Makis Katsafados, Pavlos Diakoulas, Manolis Efstratiou, Tolis Spanos, Thanasis Rammos, Giorgos Zervas, Kimonas Kokorogiannis, Charlie Yelverton
1974–75	Runners-up		Didn't participate	Faidon Matthaiou	Pavlos Diakoulas, Steve Giatzoglou, Giorgos Kastrinakis, Paul Mellini, Thanasis Rammos, Nikos Sismanidis, Tolis Spanos, Giorgos Barlas, Giannis Garonis, Giorgos Zervas, Kimonas Kokorogiannis, Michalis Karellas
1975–76	Champions	Greek Cup; Winners	Cup Winners Cup; Last 8	Faidon Matthaiou	Giorgos Kastrinakis, Steve Giatzoglou, Pavlos Diakoulas, Paul Mellini, Thanasis Rammos, Giorgos Barlas, Nikos Sismanidis, Kimonas Kokorogiannis, Tolis Spanos, Paraskevas Tsantalis, Giannis Garonis, Michalis Karellas
1976–77	Runners-up	Greek Cup; Winners	Champions Cup; Last 23	Themis Cholevas, Kostas Mourouzis	Steve Giatzoglou, Giorgos Kastrinakis, Pavlos Diakoulas, Thanasis Rammos, Giorgos Barlas, Kimonas Kokorogiannis, Paul Mellini, Giannis Garonis, Nikos Sismanidis, Tolis Spanos, Giannis Spetsiotis, Michalis Karellas
1977–78	Champions	Greek Cup; Winners	Cup Winners Cup; Last 15	Kostas Mourouzis	Steve Giatzoglou, Pavlos Diakoulas, Giorgos Barlas, Giorgos Kastrinakis, Thanasis Rammos, Paul Mellini, Kimonas Kokorogiannis, Giannis Garonis, Nikos Sismanidis, Michalis Karellas, Tolis Spanos, Giannis Spetsiotis
1978–79	Runners-up	Greek Cup; Runners-up	Champions Cup; Last 6	Kostas Mourouzis	Steve Giatzoglou, Pavlos Diakoulas, Giorgos Kastrinakis, Paul Mellini, Giorgos Barlas, Aris Raftopoulos, Kimonas Kokorogiannis, Nikos Sismanidis, Tolis Spanos, Giannis Garonis, Michalis Karellas, Giannis Spetsiotis, Jerry Jenkins
1979–80	Runners-up	Greek Cup; Winners	Korać Cup; Last 16	Kostas Mourouzis, Giorgos Barlas	Steve Giatzoglou, Pavlos Diakoulas, Giorgos Kastrinakis, Christos Iordanidis, Paul Mellini, Aris Raftopoulos, Kimonas Kokorogiannis, Nikos Sismanidis, Thanasis Rammos, Giannis Garonis, Andreas Kozakis
1980–81	Runners-up	Greek Cup; Last 16	Cup Winners Cup; Last 20	Faidon Matthaiou	Steve Giatzoglou, Pavlos Diakoulas, Giorgos Kastrinakis, Kimonas Kokorogiannis, Markos Kassimis, Aris Raftopoulos, Christos Iordanidis, Giannis Paragios, Dimitris Sampanis, Andreas Kozakis, Nikos Sismanidis, Argyris Kampouris
1981–82	6th place	Greek Cup; Last 4	Korać Cup; Last 37	Michalis Kyritsis, Thymios Filippou	Steve Giatzoglou, Kimonas Kokorogiannis, Giorgos Skropolithas, Giorgos Kastrinakis, Giannis Paragios, Pavlos Diakoulas, Andreas Kozakis, Aris Raftopoulos, Dimitris Sampanis, Alexis Christodoulou
1982–83	5th place	Greek Cup; Runners-up	Korać Cup; Last 42	Kostas Anastasatos, Giorgos Barlas	Steve Giatzoglou, Giannis Paragios, Markos Kasimis, Giorgos Kastrinakis, Kimonas Kokorogiannis, Andreas Kozakis, Aris Raftopoulos, Giorgos Skropolithas, Dimitris Sampanis, Argyris Kampouris, Alexis Christodoulou, Keith Woolfolk
1983–84	7th place	Greek Cup; Last 16	Korać Cup; Last 29	Thymios Filippou	Steve Giatzoglou, Andreas Kozakis, Giorgos Kastrinakis, Nikos Darivas, Giannis Paragios, Sarantis Papachristopoulos, Aris Raftopoulos, Argyris Kampouris, Kimonas Kokorogiannis, Dimitris Sampanis
1984–85	7th place	Greek Cup; Last 16	Didn't participate	Faidon Matthaiou	Argyris Kampouris, Aris Raftopoulos, Dimitris Sampanis, Giannis Paragios, Andreas Kozakis, Nikos Darivas, Tzimis Maniatis, Sarantis Papachristopoulos, Giannis Koukis, Angelos Nalbantis, Dimitris Papadakis, Kypriotis
1985–86	Runners-up	Greek Cup; Runners-up	Didn't participate	Kostas Anastasatos	Argyris Kampouris, Tzimis Maniatis, Giannis Paragios, Andreas Kozakis, Dimitris Sampanis, Alexis Christodoulou, Kostas Panagiotopoulos, Giannis Koukis, Angelos Nalbantis, Vasilis Dakoulas, Kostas Giannopoulos, Christos Margelis
1986–87	7th place	Greek Cup; Last 4	Korać Cup; Last 29	Kostas Anastasatos, Steve Giatzoglou	Tzimis Maniatis, Argyris Kampouris, Giannis Paragios, Kostas Panagiotopoulos, Alexis Christodoulou, Dimitris Sampanis, Giannis Koukis, Ilias Karkabasis, Vasilis Dakoulas, Kostas Giannopoulos, Thanasis Krempounis
1987–88	6th place	Greek Cup; Last 16	Didn't participate	Steve Giatzoglou	Tzimis Maniatis, Giannis Paragios, Argyris Kampouris, Kostas Panagiotopoulos, Alexis Christodoulou, Dimitris Sampanis, Peter Balis, Ilias Karkabasis, Thanasis Krempounis, Vasilis Dakoulas, Dimos Oikonomakos
1988–89	8th place	Greek Cup; Last 16	Korać Cup; Last 16	Steve Giatzoglou	Carey Scurry, Tzimis Maniatis, Vaggelis Aggelou, Greg Oikonomou, Kostas Panagiotopoulos, Alexis Christodoulou, George Papadakos, Giannis Paragios, Stavros Elliniadis, Argyris Kampouris, Panagiotis Saridakis, Kostas Moraitis, Kenneth M. Corroon, Larry Middleton
1989–90	7th place	Greek Cup; Last 16	Didn't participate	Makis Dendrinos, Michalis Kyritsis	Todd Mitchell, George Papadakos, Stavros Elliniadis, Tzimis Maniatis, Vaggelis Aggelou, Kostas Panagiotopoulos, Argyris Kampouris, Alexis Christodoulou, Kostas Moraitis, Ilias Karkabasis, Greg Oikonomou, Giorgos Momtsos
1990–91	8th place	Greek Cup; Last 16	Didn't participate	Michalis Kyritsis, Thanasis Rammos	Glynn Blackwell, Stavros Elliniadis, George Papadakos, Tzimis Maniatis, Alexis Christodoulou, Alexis Giannopoulos, Panagiotis Karatzas, Argyris Kampouris, Giorgos Sigalas, Vaggelis Aggelou, Giorgos Momtsos, Stratos Makris, Tasos Rokos
1991–92	Runners-up	Greek Cup; Last 8	Didn't participate	Giannis Ioannidis	Žarko Paspalj, George Papadakos, Antonis Stamatis, Kostas Moraitis, Stavros Elliniadis, Giorgos Sigalas, Panagiotis Karatzas, Argyris Kampouris, Babis Papadakis, Vaggelis Aggelou, Alexis Giannopoulos, Ilias Karkabasis, Tzimis Maniatis, Kostas Peppes, Christos Margelis
1992–93	Champions	Greek Cup; Last 4	European League; Last 8	Giannis Ioannidis	Žarko Paspalj, Walter Berry, Milan Tomić, Dragan Tarlać, Giorgos Sigalas, Antonis Stamatis, Giorgos Limniatis, Stavros Elliniadis, George Papadakos, Babis Papadakis, Argyris Kampouris, Rod Higgins, Kostas Moraitis, Franko Nakić
1993–94	Champions	Greek Cup; Winners	European League; Runners-up	Giannis Ioannidis	Žarko Paspalj, Roy Tarpley, Panagiotis Fasoulas, Milan Tomić, Giorgos Sigalas, Efthimis Bakatsias, Franko Nakić, Argyris Kampouris, Antonis Stamatis, Giorgos Limniatis, Panagiotis Karatzas, George Papadakos, Dragan Tarlać, Babis Papadakis
1994–95	Champions	Greek Cup; Last 26	European League; Runners-up	Giannis Ioannidis	Eddie Johnson, Sasha Volkov, Dragan Tarlać, Milan Tomić, Panagiotis Fasoulas, Efthimis Bakatsias, Giorgos Sigalas, Franko Nakić, Giorgos Limniatis, Argyris Kampouris, Antonis Stamatis, Babis Papadakis, George Papadakos
1995–96	Champions	Greek Cup; Last 8	European League; Last 8	Giannis Ioannidis	David Rivers, Giorgos Sigalas, Panagiotis Fasoulas, Franko Nakić, Dragan Tarlać, Walter Berry, Dimitris Papanikolaou, Milan Tomić, Efthimis Bakatsias, George Papadakos, Vassilis Soulis, Nasos Galakteros, Anatoly Zourpenko
1996–97	Champions	Greek Cup; Winners	EuroLeague; Champions	Dušan Ivković	David Rivers, Giorgos Sigalas, Panagiotis Fasoulas, Dragan Tarlać, Christian Welp, Franko Nakić, Milan Tomić, Dimitris Papanikolaou, Willie Anderson, Efthimis Bakatsias, Evric Gray, Nasos Galakteros, Aleksey Savrasenko, Anatoly Zourpenko
1997–98	3rd place	Greek Cup; 3rd place	EuroLeague; Last 16	Dušan Ivković	Johnny Rogers, Michael Hawkins, Artūras Karnišovas, Milan Tomić, Dušan Vukčević, Dragan Tarlać, Panagiotis Fasoulas, Dimitris Papanikolaou, Franko Nakić, Aleksey Savrasenko, Anatoly Zourpenko, Efthimis Bakatsias, Dimitris Karaplis, Nikos Michalos
1998–99	Runners-up	Greek Cup; Last 21	EuroLeague; 3rd place	Dušan Ivković	Anthony Goldwire, Dragan Tarlać, Johnny Rogers, Arijan Komazec, Milan Tomić, Dimitris Papanikolaou, Fabricio Oberto, Dušan Vukčević, Arsène Ade-Mensah, Panagiotis Fasoulas, Vassilis Soulis, Aleksey Savrasenko, Nikos Pettas, Periklis Dorkofikis, Dimitris Karaplis
1999–00	3rd place	Greek Cup; Last 16	EuroLeague; Last 16	Giannis Ioannidis	James Robinson, Dragan Tarlać, Milan Tomić, Josh Grant, Dimitris Papanikolaou, Iñaki de Miguel, Dušan Vukčević, Blue Edwards, Arsène Ade-Mensah, Chris Morris, Vassilis Soulis, Franko Nakić, Aleksey Savrasenko, Nikos Pettas
2000–01	Runners-up	Greek Cup; 3rd place	EuroLeague; Last 8	Ilias Zouros	Milan Tomić, Dino Radja, Dušan Vukčević, Nikos Oikonomou, Stéphane Risacher, Dimitris Papanikolaou, David Rivers, Patrick Femerling, Nikos Boudouris, Iñaki de Miguel, Vassilis Soulis, Periklis Dorkofikis, Nikos Pettas, Panagiotis Mantzanas
2001–02	Runners-up	Greek Cup; Winners	EuroLeague; Last 8	Ilias Zouros	Alphonso Ford, Stéphane Risacher, Thodoris Papaloukas, James Forrest, Aleksey Savrasenko, Milan Tomić, Iñaki de Miguel, Patrick Femerling, Dimitris Papanikolaou, Nikos Boudouris, Misan Nikagbatse, Dušan Jelić, Emre Ekim, Panagiotis Mantzanas, Periklis Dorkofikis
2002–03	4th place	Greek Cup; Last 8	EuroLeague; Last 8	Ilias Zouros, Slobodan Subotić	DeMarco Johnson, Maurice Evans, Nenad Marković, Iñaki de Miguel, Milan Tomić, Christos Charisis, Nikos Boudouris, Giorgos Giannouzakos, Juan Antonio Morales, Aleksey Savrasenko, Misan Nikagbatse, Veljko Mršić, Kenny Miller, Mark Bradtke, Giorgos Printezis, Panagiotis Mantzanas, Savo Djikanovic, Panagiotis Katranas
2003–04	8th place	Greek Cup; Runners-up	EuroLeague; Last 16	Slobodan Subotić, Dragan Šakota, Milan Tomić	Panagiotis Liadelis, Goran Jurak, Christos Charisis, Boris Gorenc, Dalibor Bagarić, Giorgos Diamantopoulos, Rubén Wolkowyski, Vangelis Sklavos, Milan Tomić, Giorgos Giannouzakos, Giannis Kalambokis, Branko Milisavljević, Giorgos Printezis, Kostas Charissis, Josko Kafentzis
2004–05	8th place	Greek Cup; Last 16	EuroLeague; Last 32	Milan Minić, Jonas Kazlauskas	Marque Perry, Ivan Zoroski, Lazaros Agadakos, Ivica Jurković, Lavor Postell, Vangelis Sklavos, Dušan Vukčević, Elvir Ovčina, Roger Mason, Boris Gorenc, Róbert Gulyás, Giannis Kalambokis, Jeff Nordgaard, Aggelos Koronios, Milan Tomić, Nikos Papanikolopoulos, Dimitris Misiakos, Giorgos Printezis
2005–06	Runners-up	Greek Cup; Last 8	EuroLeague; Last 8	Jonas Kazlauskas	Tyus Edney, Quincy Lewis, Manolis Papamakarios, Andrija Žižić, Panagiotis Vasilopoulos, Sofoklis Schortsanitis, Renaldas Seibutis, Nikos Barlos, Nikos Chatzis, Christos Charisis, Giorgos Printezis, Lazaros Agadakos, Matt Freije, Ivan Koljević, Nikos Argiropoulos, Dimitris Kalaitzidis, Eurelijus Zukauskas
2006–07	Runners-up	Greek Cup; Last 16	EuroLeague; Last 8	Pini Gershon	Scoonie Penn, Alex Acker, Andrija Žižić, Henry Domercant, Panagiotis Vasilopoulos, Giannis Bourousis, Manolis Papamakarios, Ryan Stack, Christos Charisis, Sofoklis Schortsanitis, Sam Hoskin, Nikos Barlos, Damir Mulaomerović, Vrbica Stefanov, Arvydas Macijauskas, Gerry McNamara
2007–08	Runners-up	Greek Cup; Runners-up	EuroLeague; Last 8	Pini Gershon, Panagiotis Giannakis	Lynn Greer, Qyntel Woods, Marc Jackson, Miloš Teodosić, Roderick Blakney, Giannis Bourousis, Giorgos Printezis, Panagiotis Vasilopoulos, Arvydas Macijauskas, Kostas Vassiliadis, Jake Tsakalidis, Loukas Mavrokefalidis, Manolis Papamakarios, Panagiotis Kafkis, Renaldas Seibutis, Sofoklis Schortsanitis
2008–09	Runners-up	Greek Cup; Runners-up	EuroLeague; 4th place	Panagiotis Giannakis	Lynn Greer, Thodoris Papaloukas, Yotam Halperin, Giannis Bourousis, Nikola Vujčić, Josh Childress, Giorgos Printezis, Panagiotis Vasilopoulos, Miloš Teodosić, Zoran Erceg, Jannero Pargo, Sofoklis Schortsanitis, Michalis Pelekanos, Igor Milošević, Ian Vougioukas, Kostas Sloukas, Charis Giannopoulos
2009–10	Runners-up	Greek Cup; Winners	EuroLeague; Runners-up	Panagiotis Giannakis	Linas Kleiza, Miloš Teodosić, Josh Childress, Thodoris Papaloukas, Nikola Vujčić, Yotam Halperin, Giannis Bourousis, Sofoklis Schortsanitis, Scoonie Penn, Panagiotis Vasilopoulos, Patrick Beverley, Loukas Mavrokefalidis, Von Wafer, Kostas Papanikolaou, Andreas Glyniadakis, Kostas Sloukas
2010–11	Runners-up	Greek Cup; Winners	EuroLeague; Last 8	Dušan Ivković	Vassilis Spanoulis, Miloš Teodosić, Radoslav Nesterović, Thodoris Papaloukas, Jamon Gordon, Loukas Mavrokefalidis, Giannis Bourousis, Zoran Erceg, Matt Nielsen, Kostas Papanikolaou, Yotam Halperin, Marko Kešelj, Michalis Pelekanos, Andreas Glyniadakis, Dimitris Katsivelis, Panagiotis Vasilopoulos, Giorgos Printezis
2011–12	Champions	Greek Cup; Runners-up	EuroLeague; Champions	Dušan Ivković	Vassilis Spanoulis, Giorgos Printezis, Kostas Papanikolaou, Kyle Hines, Pero Antić, Martynas Gecevičius, Vangelis Mantzaris, Kostas Sloukas, Marko Kešelj, Acie Law, Joey Dorsey, Lazaros Papadopoulos, Kalin Lucas, Michalis Pelekanos, Dimitris Katsivelis, Andreas Glyniadakis, Matt Howard, Panagiotis Vasilopoulos
2012–13	Runners-up	Greek Cup; Runners-up	EuroLeague; Champions	Giorgos Bartzokas	Vassilis Spanoulis, Kostas Papanikolaou, Acie Law, Kyle Hines, Giorgos Printezis, Pero Antić, Stratos Perperoglou, Kostas Sloukas, Josh Powell, Vangelis Mantzaris, Giorgi Shermadini, Martynas Gecevičius, Dimitris Mavroeidis, Dimitris Katsivelis, Joey Dorsey, Doron Perkins, Giorgos Georgakis
2013–14	Runners-up	Greek Cup; Last 4	EuroLeague; Last 8	Giorgos Bartzokas	Vassilis Spanoulis, Matt Lojeski, Bryant Dunston, Vangelis Mantzaris, Kostas Sloukas, Brent Petway, Giorgos Printezis, Stratos Perperoglou, Cedric Simmons, Acie Law, Giorgi Shermadini, Ioannis Papapetrou, Mardy Collins, Mirza Begić, Dimitris Katsivelis, Dimitris Agravanis, Vassilis Kavvadas, Jamario Moon, Andreas Christodoulou
2014–15	Champions	Greek Cup; Last 8	EuroLeague; Runners-up	Giorgos Bartzokas, Giannis Sfairopoulos	Vassilis Spanoulis, Vangelis Mantzaris, Matt Lojeski, Bryant Dunston, Othello Hunter, Oliver Lafayette, Kostas Sloukas, Giorgos Printezis, Brent Petway, Tremmell Darden, Dimitris Agravanis, Ioannis Papapetrou, Dimitris Katsivelis, Vassilis Kavvadas, Michalis Tsairelis, Andreas Christodoulou, Vassilis Mouratos
2015–16	Champions	Greek Cup; Last 8	EuroLeague; Last 16	Giannis Sfairopoulos	Vangelis Mantzaris, Vassilis Spanoulis, Giorgos Printezis, Daniel Hackett, D.J. Strawberry, Othello Hunter, Ioannis Papapetrou, Matt Lojeski, Dimitris Agravanis, Nikola Milutinov, Ioannis Athinaiou, Darius Johnson-Odom, Kostas Papanikolaou, Patric Young, Michalis Tsairelis, Hakim Warrick, Shawn James, Vassilis Mouratos, Vassilis Toliopoulos
2016–17	Runners-up	Greek Cup; Last 4	EuroLeague; Runners-up	Giannis Sfairopoulos	Vassilis Spanoulis, Vangelis Mantzaris, Kostas Papanikolaou, Giorgos Printezis, Erick Green, Khem Birch, Ioannis Papapetrou, Matt Lojeski, Nikola Milutinov, Patric Young, Dimitris Agravanis, Dominic Waters, Daniel Hackett, Ioannis Athinaiou, Vassilis Toliopoulos
2017–18	Runners-up	Greek Cup; Runners-up	EuroLeague; Last 8	Giannis Sfairopoulos	Giorgos Printezis, Ioannis Papapetrou, Jānis Strēlnieks, Kostas Papanikolaou, Vassilis Spanoulis, Nikola Milutinov, Vangelis Mantzaris, Brian Roberts, Jamel McLean, Hollis Thompson, Kyle Wiltjer, Kim Tillie, Giorgos Bogris, Dimitris Agravanis, Bobby Brown, Vassilis Toliopoulos, Nikos Arsenopoulos, Andreas Tsoumanis
2018–19	14th place (Note: Olympiacos forfeited a regular-season game, as well as the playoff series against Panathinaikos Athens, in protest against the referees selected to officiate the matches. As a penalty imposed by the Hellenic Basketball Clubs Association's board, Olympiacos' results for that season were annulled, the team was placed last in the standings, and, consequently, relegated to the A2 National Division.)	Greek Cup; Last 4 (Note: Olympiacos forfeited the semifinal game against Panathinaikos at halftime, in protest against the referees' decisions.)	EuroLeague; 9th place	David Blatt	Nigel Williams-Goss, Giorgos Printezis, Nikola Milutinov, Kostas Papanikolaou, Vassilis Spanoulis, Zach LeDay, Jānis Strēlnieks, Axel Toupane, Vangelis Mantzaris, Sasha Vezenkov, Jānis Timma, Briante Weber, Giorgos Bogris, Aleksej Pokuševski, Dimitris Agravanis, Vassilis Toliopoulos, Will Cherry, Iosif Koloveros, Thomas Zevgaras, Andreas Tsoumanis
2019–20	Didn't participate	Greek Cup; Didn't participate	EuroLeague; 9th place	David Blatt, Kęstutis Kemzūra, Giorgos Bartzokas	Giorgos Printezis, Kostas Papanikolaou, Nikola Milutinov, Vassilis Spanoulis, Brandon Paul, Wade Baldwin, Augustine Rubit, Sasha Vezenkov, Antonis Koniaris, Taylor Rochestie, Will Cherry, Kevin Punter, Octavius Ellis, Willie Reed, Shaquielle McKissic, Mindaugas Kuzminskas, Dwight Buycks, Alexandros Nikolaidis, Vasilis Charalabopoulos, Aleksej Pokuševski, Ethan Happ
2020–21	Didn't participate	Greek Cup; Didn't participate	EuroLeague; 12th place	Giorgos Bartzokas	Kostas Sloukas, Shaquielle McKissic, Sasha Vezenkov, Vassilis Spanoulis, Giorgos Printezis, Hassan Martin, Charles Jenkins, Livio Jean-Charles, Aaron Harrison, Octavius Ellis, Kostas Papanikolaou, Giannoulis Larentzakis, Vassilis Charalampopoulos, Kosta Koufos, Antonis Koniaris, Alexandros Nikolaidis
2020–21	Didn't participate	GBL Super Cup; Didn't participate	EuroLeague; 12th place	Giorgos Bartzokas	Kostas Sloukas, Shaquielle McKissic, Sasha Vezenkov, Vassilis Spanoulis, Giorgos Printezis, Hassan Martin, Charles Jenkins, Livio Jean-Charles, Aaron Harrison, Octavius Ellis, Kostas Papanikolaou, Giannoulis Larentzakis, Vassilis Charalampopoulos, Kosta Koufos, Antonis Koniaris, Alexandros Nikolaidis
2021–22	Champions	Greek Cup; Winners	EuroLeague; 4th place	Giorgos Bartzokas	Sasha Vezenkov, Kostas Sloukas, Tyler Dorsey, Kostas Papanikolaou, Moustapha Fall, Thomas Walkup, Shaquielle McKissic, Hassan Martin, Giannoulis Larentzakis, Giorgos Printezis, Livio Jean-Charles, Michalis Lountzis, Quincy Acy, Vassilis Christidis, Sotiris Oikonomopoulos
2021–22	Champions	GBL Super Cup; Didn't participate	EuroLeague; 4th place	Giorgos Bartzokas	Sasha Vezenkov, Kostas Sloukas, Tyler Dorsey, Kostas Papanikolaou, Moustapha Fall, Thomas Walkup, Shaquielle McKissic, Hassan Martin, Giannoulis Larentzakis, Giorgos Printezis, Livio Jean-Charles, Michalis Lountzis, Quincy Acy, Vassilis Christidis, Sotiris Oikonomopoulos
2022–23	Champions	Greek Cup; Winners	EuroLeague; Runners-up	Giorgos Bartzokas	Sasha Vezenkov, Thomas Walkup, Kostas Papanikolaou, Moustapha Fall, Kostas Sloukas, Shaquielle McKissic, Isaiah Canaan, Giannoulis Larentzakis, Alec Peters, Joel Bolomboy, Tarik Black, Michalis Lountzis, George Papas, Iosif Koloveros, Veniamin Abosi, Panagiotis Tsamis
2022–23	Champions	GBL Super Cup; Winners	EuroLeague; Runners-up	Giorgos Bartzokas	Sasha Vezenkov, Thomas Walkup, Kostas Papanikolaou, Moustapha Fall, Kostas Sloukas, Shaquielle McKissic, Isaiah Canaan, Giannoulis Larentzakis, Alec Peters, Joel Bolomboy, Tarik Black, Michalis Lountzis, George Papas, Iosif Koloveros, Veniamin Abosi, Panagiotis Tsamis
2023–24	Runners-up	Greek Cup; Winners	EuroLeague; 3rd place	Giorgos Bartzokas	Thomas Walkup, Alec Peters, Kostas Papanikolaou, Isaiah Canaan, Moustapha Fall, Nigel Williams-Goss, Shaquielle McKissic, Nikola Milutinov, Giannoulis Larentzakis, Filip Petrusev, Ignas Brazdeikis, Luke Sikma, Moses Wright, Michalis Lountzis, Naz Mitrou-Long, George Papas, Georgios Tanoulis, Anastasios Rozakeas, Veniamin Abosi
2023–24	Runners-up	GBL Super Cup; Winners	EuroLeague; 3rd place	Giorgos Bartzokas	Thomas Walkup, Alec Peters, Kostas Papanikolaou, Isaiah Canaan, Moustapha Fall, Nigel Williams-Goss, Shaquielle McKissic, Nikola Milutinov, Giannoulis Larentzakis, Filip Petrusev, Ignas Brazdeikis, Luke Sikma, Moses Wright, Michalis Lountzis, Naz Mitrou-Long, George Papas, Georgios Tanoulis, Anastasios Rozakeas, Veniamin Abosi
2024–25	Champions	Greek Cup; Runners-up	EuroLeague; 3rd place	Giorgos Bartzokas	Sasha Vezenkov, Evan Fournier, Nigel Williams-Goss, Kostas Papanikolaou, Alec Peters, Shaquielle McKissic, Moustapha Fall, Luca Vildoza, Nikola Milutinov, Thomas Walkup, Moses Wright, Saben Lee, Tyler Dorsey, Giannoulis Larentzakis, Filip Petrusev, Naz Mitrou-Long, Nathan Mensah, Stefanos Spartalis, Giorgos Bourneles, Thodoris Pavlopoulos
2024–25	Champions	GBL Super Cup; Winners	EuroLeague; 3rd place	Giorgos Bartzokas	Sasha Vezenkov, Evan Fournier, Nigel Williams-Goss, Kostas Papanikolaou, Alec Peters, Shaquielle McKissic, Moustapha Fall, Luca Vildoza, Nikola Milutinov, Thomas Walkup, Moses Wright, Saben Lee, Tyler Dorsey, Giannoulis Larentzakis, Filip Petrusev, Naz Mitrou-Long, Nathan Mensah, Stefanos Spartalis, Giorgos Bourneles, Thodoris Pavlopoulos
2025–26	Champions	Greek Cup; Runners-up	EuroLeague; Champions	Giorgos Bartzokas	Sasha Vezenkov, Tyler Dorsey, Thomas Walkup, Nikola Milutinov, Evan Fournier, Tyson Ward, Alec Peters, Donta Hall, Kostas Papanikolaou, Frank Ntilikina, Shaquielle McKissic, Cory Joseph, Tyrique Jones, Saben Lee, Monte Morris, Kostas Antetokounmpo, Giannoulis Larentzakis, Omiros Netzipoglou, Moustapha Fall, Keenan Evans, Giorgos Bourneles
2025–26	Champions	GBL Super Cup; Winners	EuroLeague; Champions	Giorgos Bartzokas	Sasha Vezenkov, Tyler Dorsey, Thomas Walkup, Nikola Milutinov, Evan Fournier, Tyson Ward, Alec Peters, Donta Hall, Kostas Papanikolaou, Frank Ntilikina, Shaquielle McKissic, Cory Joseph, Tyrique Jones, Saben Lee, Monte Morris, Kostas Antetokounmpo, Giannoulis Larentzakis, Omiros Netzipoglou, Moustapha Fall, Keenan Evans, Giorgos Bourneles

=== GBL records (wins–losses, winning percentage) ===
Notes: a) a season's winning percentage is shown in bold if it's greater than the all-time winning percentage,
b) the seasons in which Olympiacos have been crowned champions are shown in gold, c) d.n.p. stands for did not participate.

Season	W–L	W%
1963–64	5–13	0.278
1964–65	d.n.p.	
1965–66	d.n.p.	
1966–67	d.n.p.	
1967–68	14–8	0.636
1968–69	13–9	0.591
1969–70	13–9	0.591
1970–71	19–7	0.731
1971–72	22–5	**0.815**
1972–73	23–3	**0.885**
1973–74	12–11	0.522
1974–75	19–3	**0.864**
1975–76	22–0	**1.000**
1976–77	18–4	**0.818**
1977–78	21–1	**0.955**
1978–79	22–4	**0.846**

Season	W–L	W%
1979–80	24–6	**0.800**
1980–81	21–5	**0.808**
1981–82	16–10	0.615
1982–83	17–9	0.654
1983–84	13–13	0.500
1984–85	12–14	0.462
1985–86	20–6	**0.769**
1986–87	10–12	0.455
1987–88	12–11	0.522
1988–89	9–15	0.375
1989–90	13–15	0.464
1990–91	15–17	0.469
1991–92	22–7	**0.759**
1992–93	28–9	**0.757**
1993–94	30–6	**0.833**
1994–95	31–5	**0.861**

Season	W–L	W%
1995–96	31–5	**0.861**
1996–97	28–7	**0.800**
1997–98	27–8	**0.771**
1998–99	27–10	0.730
1999–00	26–8	**0.765**
2000–01	27–8	**0.771**
2001–02	26–10	0.722
2002–03	22–14	0.611
2003–04	13–15	0.464
2004–05	13–15	0.464
2005–06	27–9	0.750
2006–07	28–11	0.718
2007–08	29–9	**0.763**
2008–09	31–4	**0.886**
2009–10	29–6	**0.829**
2010–11	32–3	**0.914**

Season	W–L	W%
2011–12	31–3	0.912
2012–13	30–4	0.882
2013–14	31–5	0.861
2014–15	33–2	0.943
2015–16	33–2	0.943
2016–17	30–4	0.882
2017–18	29–7	0.806
2018–19	23–4	0.852
2019–20	d.n.p.	
2020–21	d.n.p.	
2021–22	31–1	0.969
2022–23	30–1	0.968
2023–24	30–6	0.833
2024–25	27–3	0.900
2025–26	31–2	0.939

All-time winning percentage	**0.757** (1321 wins – 423 losses)
Top-3 best winning percentages	**1.000** (1975–76), **0.969** (2021–22), **0.968** (2022–23)
Top-3 worst winning percentages	**0.278** (1963–64), **0.375** (1988–89), **0.455** (1986–87)
Μost wins in a season	**33** (2014–15, 2015–16)
Μost losses in a season	**17** (1990–91)

=== EuroLeague records (wins–losses, winning percentage) ===
Notes: a) a season's winning percentage is shown in bold if it's greater than the all-time winning percentage,
b) the seasons in which Olympiacos have been crowned champions are shown in gold.

Season	W–L	W%
1992–93	11–8	0.579
1993–94	14–5	**0.737**
1994–95	12–7	**0.632**
1995–96	11–6	**0.647**
1996–97	15–8	**0.652**
1997–98	12–6	**0.667**
1998–99	16–6	**0.727**
1999–00	11–8	0.579
2000–01	9–5	**0.643**
2001–02	14–6	**0.700**

Season	W–L	W%
2002–03	10–10	0.500
2003–04	8–12	0.400
2004–05	4–10	0.286
2005–06	12–11	0.522
2006–07	13–9	0.591
2007–08	12–11	0.522
2008–09	14–8	**0.636**
2009–10	17–5	**0.773**
2010–11	13–7	**0.650**
2011–12	14–8	**0.636**

Season	W–L	W%
2012–13	22–9	**0.710**
2013–14	20–9	**0.690**
2014–15	22–8	**0.733**
2015–16	14–10	0.583
2016–17	23–14	**0.622**
2017–18	20–14	0.588
2018–19	15–15	0.500
2019–20	12–16	0.429
2020–21	16–18	0.471
2021–22	22–13	**0.629**

Season	W–L	W%
2022–23	28–13	**0.683**
2023–24	26–15	**0.634**
2024–25	28–12	**0.700**
2025–26	31–12	**0.721**

All-time winning percentage	**0.618** (541 wins – 334 losses)
Top-3 best winning percentages	**0.773** (2009–10), **0.737** (1993–94), **0.733** (2014–15)
Top-3 worst winning percentages	**0.286** (2004–05), **0.400** (2003–04), **0.429** (2019–20)
Μost wins in a season	**31** (2025–26)
Μost losses in a season	**18** (2020–21)

== The roads to European glory ==
Note: Wins are shown in gold, losses are shown in silver.

=== 1996–97 EuroLeague ===
Round	Opponent	Home	Away
GS1	(Germany) Alba Berlin	64–67	61–62
GS1	(Italy) Fortitudo Bologna	96–80	72–81
GS1	(Belgium) Spirou Charleroi	87–60	79–72
GS1	(Croatia) Cibona Zagreb	62–61	61–63
GS1	(Spain) Estudiantes Madrid	110–78	78–87
GS2	(Russia) CSKA Moscow	82–51	79–70
GS2	(Italy) Olimpia Milano	87–84	71–73
GS2	(Israel) Maccabi Tel Aviv	69–60	78–82
Top 16	(Federal Republic of Yugoslavia) Partizan Belgrade	60–61	81–71
Top 16	(Federal Republic of Yugoslavia) Partizan Belgrade	60–61	74–69

Round	Opponent	Home	Away
QF	(Greece) Panathinaikos Athens	65–57	69–49
SF	(Slovenia) Olimpija Ljubljana	74–65	
Final	(Spain) FC Barcelona	73–58	

=== 2011–12 EuroLeague ===
Round	Opponent	Home	Away
RS	(Spain) Bilbao Basket	88–81	61–76
RS	(Turkey) Fenerbahçe Istanbul	81–74	70–86
RS	(Spain) Baskonia Vitoria-Gasteiz	84–82	79–81
RS	(Italy) Pallacanestro Cantù	86–61	63–64
RS	(France) SLUC Nancy	91–78	79–74
Top 16	(Russia) CSKA Moscow	78–86	64–96
Top 16	(Turkey) Galatasaray Istanbul	88–81	77–78
Top 16	(Turkey) Anadolu Efes Istanbul	83–65	67–65

Round	Opponent	Home	Away
QF	(Italy) Mens Sana Siena	75–55	82–75
QF	(Italy) Mens Sana Siena	76–69	80–81
SF	(Spain) FC Barcelona	68–64	
Final	(Russia) CSKA Moscow	62–61	

=== 2012–13 EuroLeague ===
Round	Opponent	Home	Away
RS	(Spain) Baskonia Vitoria-Gasteiz	85–81	89–72
RS	(Turkey) Anadolu Efes Istanbul	75–53	72–98
RS	(Lithuania) Žalgiris Kaunas	61–79	77–63
RS	(Croatia) Cedevita Zagreb	79–77	84–62
RS	(Italy) Olimpia Milano	82–81	84–71
Top 16	(Spain) Baskonia Vitoria-Gasteiz	82–74	74–82
Top 16	(Turkey) Beşiktaş Istanbul	77–64	79–60
Top 16	(Spain) FC Barcelona	77–90	68–76
Top 16	(Italy) Mens Sana Siena	72–74	68–67
Top 16	(Israel) Maccabi Tel Aviv	67–73	78–77
Top 16	(Turkey) Fenerbahçe Istanbul	82–71	78–73
Top 16	(Russia) Khimki Moscow Region	79–70	87–82

Round	Opponent	Home	Away
QF	(Turkey) Anadolu Efes Istanbul	67–62	72–83
QF	(Turkey) Anadolu Efes Istanbul	71–53	73–74
QF	(Turkey) Anadolu Efes Istanbul	82–72	
SF	(Russia) CSKA Moscow	69–52	
Final	(Spain) Real Madrid	100–88	

=== 2025–26 EuroLeague ===
Round	Opponent	Home	Away
RS	(Spain) Baskonia Vitoria-Gasteiz	90–80	102–96
RS	(Spain) Real Madrid	102–88	77–89
RS	(United Arab Emirates) Dubai Basketball	86–67	98–108
RS	(Turkey) Anadolu Efes Istanbul	78–82	74–68
RS	(Israel) Maccabi Tel Aviv	100–93	95–94
RS	(Germany) Bayern Munich	95–80	96–71
RS	(France) AS Monaco	87–92	80–81
RS	(Israel) Hapoel Tel Aviv	62–58	89–85
RS	(Serbia) Partizan Belgrade	80–71	104–66
RS	(Lithuania) Žalgiris Kaunas	95–78	94–99
RS	(Italy) Olimpia Milano	85–76	87–88
RS	(France) Paris Basketball	98–86	104–87
RS	(Serbia) Red Star Belgrade	92–86	80–91
RS	(Spain) FC Barcelona	87–75	85–98
RS	(Spain) Valencia Basket	92–99	84–85
RS	(France) ASVEL Basket	107–84	82–74
RS	(Italy) Virtus Bologna	109–77	97–94
RS	(Greece) Panathinaikos Athens	86–80	87–82
RS	(Turkey) Fenerbahçe Istanbul	104–87	80–88

Round	Opponent	Home	Away
QF	(France) AS Monaco	91–70	105–82
QF	(France) AS Monaco	94–64	
SF	(Turkey) Fenerbahçe Istanbul	79–61	
Final	(Spain) Real Madrid	92–85	

== Matches against NBA teams ==
On 18 October 1997, Olympiacos became the first Greek team to face an NBA team. As European champions, they played against the back-to-back NBA champions, the Chicago Bulls, in the final of the 1997 McDonald's Championship in Paris, France. Although the game rules allowed the zone defense, which was still prohibited in the NBA, Olympiacos did not use it. With Scottie Pippen and Dennis Rodman unavailable for the Bulls, legendary Michael Jordan scored 27 points for the NBA champions, who won 104–78.

In October 2009, Olympiacos visited the United States for the 2009 Euroleague American Tour and played against the San Antonio Spurs at the AT&T Center and then against the Cleveland Cavaliers at the Quicken Loans Arena.

18 October 1997

Chicago Bulls (United States)	104–78	(Greece) Olympiacos
Scoring by quarter: 30–20, 24–23, 21–17, 29–18
Pts: Jordan 27; Rebs: Wennington 9		Pts: Karnišovas 19; Rebs: Tarlać 11

Palais Omnisports de Paris-Bercy, Paris
Attendance: 13,515
Referees: Dick Bavetta (USA), Pascal Dorizon (FRA)

9 October 2009
08:30 ET

Box Score

San Antonio Spurs (United States)	107–89	(Greece) Olympiacos
Scoring by quarter: 39–21, 27–25, 17–20, 24–23
Pts: Hill 17; Rebs: Duncan 5 Asts: Ginóbili 5		Pts: Schortsanitis 16; Rebs: Childress 9 Asts: Papaloukas 4

AT&T Center, San Antonio, TX
Attendance: 17,677
Referees: George McDaniels (USA), Scott Twardoski (USA), Jamie Morales (USA)

12 October 2009
07:00 ET

Box Score

Cleveland Cavaliers (United States)	111–94	(Greece) Olympiacos
Scoring by quarter: 31–25, 29–19, 30–21, 21–29
Pts: Gibson 15; Rebs: Varejão 8 Asts: James 7		Pts: Childress, Kleiza 16; Rebs: Papaloukas 6 Asts: Papaloukas 7

Quicken Loans Arena, Cleveland, OH
Attendance: 19,791
Referees: Jeffrey Smith (USA), Erik Hanspard (USA), Andre Crawford (USA)

== Ownership and management ==
Until 1991, the president of Olympiacos CFP was responsible for the management of the basketball department. In 1991, the department became professional and Sokratis Kokkalis took over as owner and president. In the summer of 2004, Kokkalis resigned as president and placed his shares at the disposal of the club. However, he announced his return before the start of the new season, with Panagiotis and Giorgos Angelopoulos starting to participate in the management and provide financial support. Eventually, the Angelopoulos brothers acquired ownership of the club in June 2009, while Panagiotis became president in January 2010, a position he remains in to this day.

== Kit manufacturers and shirt sponsors ==
Since 1983, Olympiacos has had a specific kit manufacturer and shirt sponsor. The tables below present them by season:

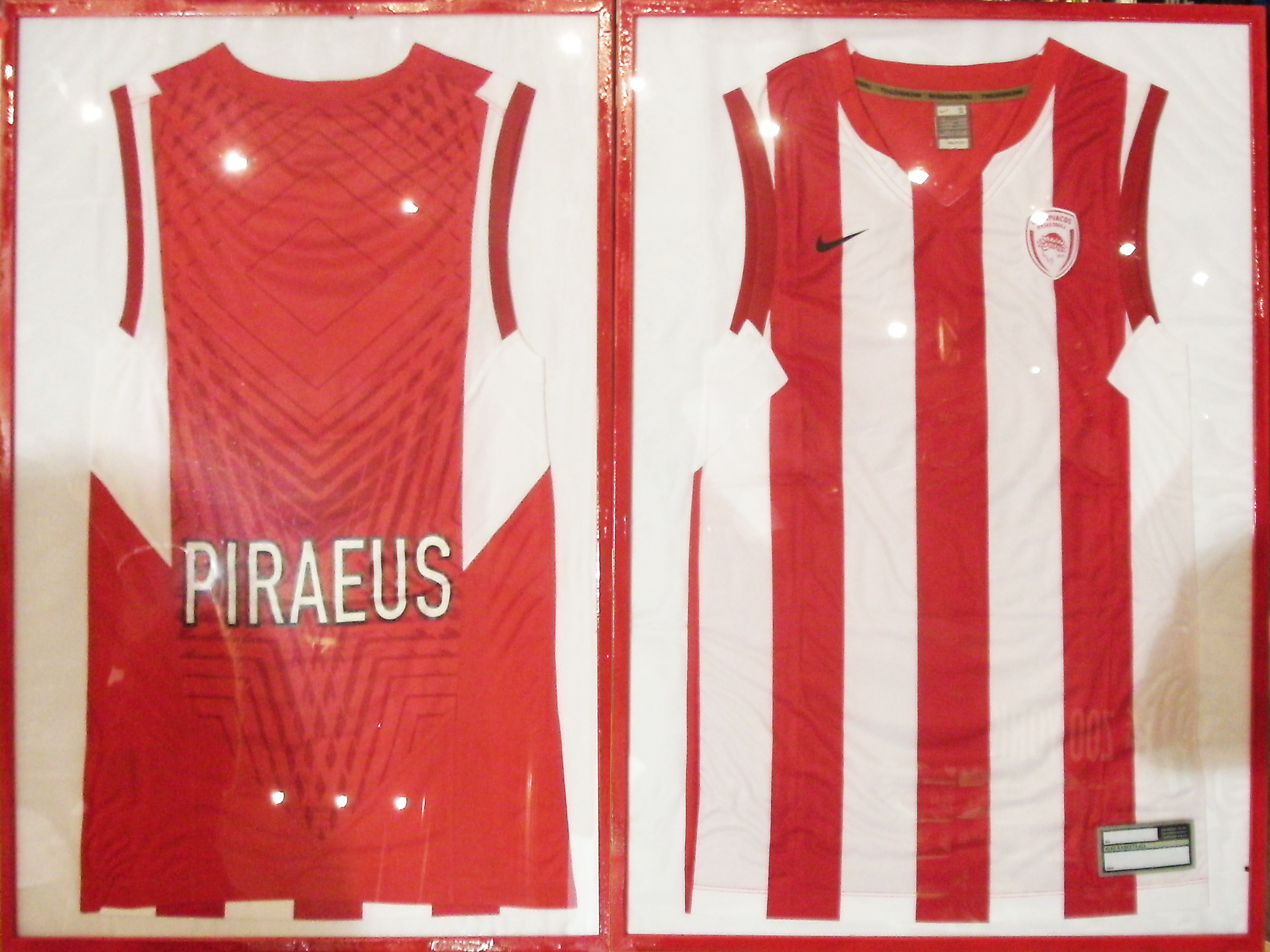
Olympiacos 2009–2010 jersey

Seasons	Kit manufacturer	Ref.	Shirt sponsor	Ref.
1983–84	ASICS		Sharp	
1984–85	ASICS		Ventouris Ferries	
1985–86	Puma		Ventouris Ferries	
1986–88	Puma		None	
1988–89	Nike		Evga	
1989–90	Reebok		Toyota	
1990–91	Reebok		VW Tournikiotis	
1991–92	Kappa		Nissan	
1992	ASICS		Intrasoft	
1992–93	Nike		Intrasoft	
1993–95	Nike		Lacta	
1995–96	Nike		Red Club MasterCard	
1996–97	Nike		Lacta	
1997–98	Nike		None	
1998–99	Nike		Lacta	
1999–00	Nike		Intracom	
2000–04	Nike		SAP	
2004–06	Puma		Vodafone	
2006–07	Puma		Citibank	
2007–09	Nike		Citibank	
2009–11	Nike		WIND	
2011–14	Nike		Tzoker	
2014–18	Nike		Skrats	
2018–20	Nike		bwin	
2020–26	GSA		bwin	
2026–	Nike		Superbet	
