= 2026 Greek Basketball Super Cup =

2026 Greek Super Cup
- Season: 2026-27
- Duration: 26–27 September 2026
- Teams: 4

Finals
- Champions: Olympiacos (5th title)
- Runners-up: PAOK
- Final Four MVP: (Bulgaria) Sasha Vezenkov

Statistical leaders
Points	(Bulgaria) Sasha Vezenkov (Dominican Republic) Jean Montero	39
Rebounds	(Bulgaria) Sasha Vezenkov	16
Assists	(United States) Codi Miller-McIntyre	13

The 2026 Greek Basketball Super Cup, officially named Stoiximan Super Cup 2026 for sponsorship reasons, will be the 7th edition of the revived Greek professional basketball Super Cup competition, under the auspices of the Hellenic Basketball Clubs Association (HEBA), and the 8th overall. The tournament is scheduled to be played from 26 to 27 September 2026 at the Peristeri, Greece.

Olympiacos are the defending champions, having won their fourth consecutive title in the 2025 edition.

== Format ==
The competition will be played in a final-four format and single elimination games, between the teams placed in the four first places of the 2025–26 Greek Basket League, which include the 2025–26 Greek Basketball Cup winner and finalist.

=== Qualified teams ===
The following four teams qualified for the tournament:

Team	Qualification method	Appearance	Previous appearances
Olympiacos	2025–26 Greek League Champion, 2025–26 Greek Cup Runners-up, 2025 Greek Super Cup Winner	5th	2022, 2023, 2024, 2025
Panathinaikos AKTOR	2025–26 Greek League Runners-up, 2025–26 Greek Cup Winner	7th	1986, 2020, 2021, 2022, 2023, 2024
AEK	2025–26 Greek League 3rd place	4th	2020, 2021, 2025
PAOK	2025–26 Greek League 4th place	2th	2023

== Bracket ==
Semifinals; 26 September 2025
Olympiacos	93
AEK	80
Panathinaikos	82
PAOK	84

Finals; 27 September 2025
Olympiacos	101
PAOK	96

== Semifinals ==
=== Olympiacos vs. AEK ===
Olympiacos emerged as the big winner of the first semifinal at the 2026 Stoiximan Super Cup, defeating AEK 93-80; the team will now vie for its fifth consecutive title in the competition on Sunday night. In his debut on Greek courts, Jean Montero recorded 19 points and 5 assists; alongside Donta Hall (19 points, 7 rebounds), he was a standout performer for Olympiacos, a team that also saw Sasha Vezenkovv and Tyler Dorsey score 14 points each. Giorgos Tsalmpouris (18 points), Nelly Joseph (16 points and 5 rebounds), and Dimitris Katsivelis (10 points) stood out for AEK.

26 September 2026	Olympiacos	93–80	AEK	Peristeri
16:45	Scoring by quarter: 28–18, 18–19, 28–25, 19–18
	Pts: Hall 19; Montero 19; Rebs: Hall 7 Asts: McIntyre 8	Boxscore	Pts: Tsalmpouris 18; Rebs: Joseph 5 Asts: Nolley 6	Arena: Peristeri Indoor Hall Andreas Papandreou; Referees: Tsaroucha; Kapranos; Agrafotis

=== Panathinaikos vs. PAOK ===
With two three-pointers from Sylvain Francisco, Panathinaikos narrowed the gap to 82-81 with 18 seconds remaining in a match where the "Double-Headed Eagle of the North" had held the lead for the majority of the game. In addition to playing a pivotal role in the "Double-Headed Eagle of the North's" victory, Osman was the game's top scorer with 18 points and also grabbed 6 rebounds. Kyle Alexander scored 15 points (shooting 7-for-10 from two-point range), while Ben Moore nearly recorded a double-double with 11 points and 9 rebounds. For the losing side, Francisco put in the strongest effort, scoring 20 points on 6-for-9 shooting from the field and dishing out 7 assists. Brancou Badio scored 17 points, shooting 5-for-8 from the field.

26 September 2026	Panathinaikos	82–84	PAOK	Peristeri
21:00	Scoring by quarter: 15–24, 19–14, 24–17, 24–29
	Pts: Fransisco 20; Rebs: Rogkavopoulos 7 Asts: Fransisco 7	Boxscore	Pts: Osman 18; Rebs: Moore 9 Asts: Calathes 6 Foster 6	Arena: Peristeri Indoor Hall Andreas Papandreou; Referees: Tiganis; Tsimpouris; Pitsilkas

== Final ==
=== Olympiacos vs. PAOK ===
After defeating AEK, Olympiacos also prevailed over the other "Double-Headed Eagle" of Greek basketball, winning the Stoiximan Super Cup for the fifth consecutive year. The "Red-and-Whites" beat PAOK 101–96 in the final held at the "Andreas Papandreou" arena. Sasha Vezenkov was Olympiacos's standout performer with 25 points and 10 rebounds, while Montero scored 20 points and Fournier 19. For PAOK, seven players reached double-digit scoring, led by Foster with 18 points and Osman and Alexander with 15 each points

27 September 2026	Olympiacos	101–96	PAOK	Peristeri
20:00	Scoring by quarter: 25–16, 25–19, 24–29, 27–31
	Pts: Vezenkov 25; Rebs: Vezenkov 10; Asts: McIntyre 5 Montero 5	Boxscore	Pts: Foster 18; Rebs: Alexander 8 Asts: Calathes 6	Arena: Peristeri Indoor Hall Andreas Papandreou; Referees: Tsaroucha; Kapranos; Tsimpouris

Starters:			Pts	Reb	Ast
PG	0	(United States) Codi Miller-McIntyre	0	1	5
SG	22	(Greece) Tyler Dorsey	8	0	1
SF	16	(Greece) Kostas Papanikolaou	6	1	3
PF	14	(Bulgaria) Sasha Vezenkov	25	10	2
C	45	(Azerbaijan) Donta Hall	12	8	0
Reserves:					
SF	3	(United States) Tyson Ward	2	4	1
PG	8	(Dominican Republic) Jean Montero	20	2	5
PG	9	(Greece) Nikos Plotas	DNP		
SG	21	(Greece) Omiros Netzipoglou	0	0	0
PF	24	(Senegal) Mbaye Ndiaye	9	6	0
C	29	(Greece) Antonis Karagiannidis	DNP		
SF	94	(France) Evan Fournier	19	4	3
Head coach:
(Hellenic Basketball Federation) Georgios Bartzokas

Olympiacos	PAOK

Olympiacos	Statistics	PAOK
24/41 (58.5%)	2-pt field goals	16/32 (50.0%)
9/24 (37.5%)	3-pt field goals	18/35 (51.4%)
26/34 (76.5%)	Free throws	10/14 (71.4%)
11	Offensive rebounds	8
25	Defensive rebounds	22
36	Total rebounds	30
25	Assists	19
9	Turnovers	12
7	Steals	5
4	Blocks	2
18	Fouls	26

2026 Greek Super Cup winners
Olympiacos
(5th title)

Starters:			Pts	Reb	Ast
PG	33	(Greece) Nick Calathes	11	0	6
SG	1	(Canada) Naz Mitrou-Long	11	1	0
SF	6	(Turkey) Cedi Osman	15	7	3
PF	18	(Greece) Nikos Persidis	10	7	1
C	8	(Canada) Kyle Alexander	15	8	1
Reserves:					
PG	5	(United States) Breein Tyree	2	0	1
PG	12	(United States) Trevor Hudgins	11	3	3
C	14	(Greece) Dimitris Kaklamanakis	DNP		
SG	17	(United States) Marcus Foster	18	1	5
SG	25	(Greece) Giorgos Fillios	DNP		
C	26	(United States) Ben Moore	3	2	2
PG	77	(Greece) Nasos Bazinas	DNP		
Head coach:
(Italian Basketball Federation) Andrea Trinchieri

== Awards ==
=== Finals Most Valuable Player ===
Player	Team
(Bulgaria) Sasha Vezenkov	Olympiacos

=== Finals Top Scorer ===
Player	Team
(Bulgaria) Sasha Vezenkov	Olympiacos
