= 2024 Greek Basketball Super Cup =

2024 Greek Super Cup
- Season: 2024-25
- Duration: 28–29 September 2024
- Teams: 4

Finals
- Champions: Olympiacos (3rd title)
- Runners-up: Panathinaikos OPAP
- Final Four MVP: (Bulgaria) Sasha Vezenkov

Statistical leaders
| Points | (Bulgaria) Sasha Vezenkov | 40 |
| Rebounds | (Serbia) Filip Petrusev | 17 |
| Assists | (United States) Tobin Carberry | 11 |

The 2024 Greek Basketball Super Cup is the 5th edition of the revived Greek professional domestic basketball Supercup competition, under the auspices of the Hellenic Basketball Clubs Association (HEBA), and the 6th overall. The previous winner of the super cup was Olympiacos. The tournament was played from 28 to 29 September in Rhodes, Greece. Olympiacos won the 2024 Greek Super Cup.

== Format ==
The competition will be played in a final-four format and single elimination games, between the teams placed in the four first places of the 2023–24 Greek Basket League, which include the 2023–24 Greek Basketball Cup winner and finalist.

=== Qualified teams ===
The following four teams qualified for the tournament.

| Team | Method of qualification | Appearance | Previous appearances |
|---|---|---|---|
| Panathinaikos OPAP | 2023–24 Greek League Champion, 2023–24 Greek Cup Runners-Up, 2023 Greek Super Cup Runners-Up | 6th | 1986, 2020, 2021, 2022, 2023 |
| Olympiacos | 2023–24 Greek League Runners-Up, 2023–24 Greek Cup Winner, 2023 Greek Super Cup Winner | 3rd | 2022, 2023 |
| Peristeri | 2023–24 Greek League 3rd Place | 4th | 2020, 2022, 2023 |
| Aris | 2023–24 Greek League 4th Place | 2nd | 1986 |

== Bracket ==
Semifinals; 28 September 2024
Panathinaikos | 81
Aris | 68
Olympiacos | 79
Peristeri | 74

Finals; 29 September 2024
Panathinaikos | 85
Olympiacos | 86
Third place
Aris | 69
Peristeri | 73

== Semifinals ==
| 28 September 2024 | Panathinaikos AKTOR | 81–68 | Aris | Rhodes |
| 17:15 | Scoring by quarter: 20–20, 24–10, 22–16, 15–22 |
| | Pts: Nunn 16; Rebs: Mitoglou 6 Asts: Sloukas 5 | Boxscore | | Arena: Kallithea Palais des Sports |

| 28 September 2024 | Olympiacos | 79–74 | Peristeri | Rhodes |
| 20:45 | Scoring by quarter: 22–19, 19–15, 19–23, 19–17 |
| | Pts: Vezenkov 20; Rebs: Petrušev 9 Asts: Walkup 5 | Boxscore | | Arena: Kallithea Palais des Sports |

== Final ==
| 29 September 2024 | Panathinaikos | 85–86 | Olympiacos | Rhodes |
| 20:30 | Scoring by quarter: 16–21, 22–24, 24–18, 23–23 |
| | Pts: Grigonis 19; Rebs: Lessort 8 Asts: Nunn 3 | Boxscore | Pts: Vezenkov 20; Rebs: Petrusev 8 Asts: Walkup 5 | Arena: Kallithea Palais des Sports; Referees: Papapetrou; Tsolakos; Tsimpouris |

| Starters: | | | Pts | Reb | Ast |
|---|---|---|---|---|---|
| PG | 22 | (United States) Jerian Grant | 12 | 1 | 1 |
| SG | 25 | (United States) Kendrick Nunn | 15 | 2 | 3 |
| SF | 21 | (Greece) Ioannis Papapetrou | 6 | 0 | 1 |
| PF | 44 | (Greece) Dinos Mitoglou | 0 | 5 | 1 |
| C | 26 | (France) Mathias Lessort | 11 | 8 | 2 |
| Reserves: | | | | | |
| SG | 0 | (Greece) Panagiotis Kalaitzakis | 0 | 0 | 0 |
| PG | 6 | (Greece) Dimitris Moraitis | 0 | 0 | 0 |
| PG | 10 | (Greece) Kostas Sloukas | 18 | 3 | 1 |
| PF | 20 | (Greece) Alexandros Samodurov | 0 | 0 | 0 |
| SG | 40 | (Lithuania) Marius Grigonis | 19 | 4 | 0 |
| PF | 41 | (Spain) Juancho Hernangómez | 2 | 5 | 0 |
| C | 77 | (Turkey) Ömer Yurtseven | 2 | 0 | 0 |
Head coach:
(Turkish Basketball Federation) Ergin Ataman

| Panathinaikos | Olympiacos |

| Panathinaikos | Statistics | Olympiacos |
|---|---|---|
| 17/34 (50.0%) | 2-pt field goals | 17/28 (60.7%) |
| 11/26 (42.3%) | 3-pt field goals | 13/28 (46.4%) |
| 18/24 (75.0%) | Free throws | 13/17 (76.5%) |
| 8 | Offensive rebounds | 6 |
| 24 | Defensive rebounds | 22 |
| 32 | Total rebounds | 28 |
| 10 | Assists | 17 |
| 10 | Turnovers | 12 |
| 6 | Steals | 5 |
| 1 | Blocks | 1 |
| 23 | Fouls | 22 |

2024 Greek Super Cup winners
Olympiacos
(3rd title)

| Starters: | | | Pts | Reb | Ast |
|---|---|---|---|---|---|
| PG | 1 | (United States) Nigel Williams-Goss | 3 | 1 | 4 |
| SG | 22 | (Greece) Tyler Dorsey | 19 | 3 | 2 |
| SF | 94 | (France) Evan Fournier | 7 | 4 | 1 |
| PF | 14 | (Bulgaria) Sasha Vezenkov | 20 | 4 | 1 |
| C | 2 | (United States) Moses Wright | 9 | 6 | 0 |
| Reserves: | | | | | |
| PG | 0 | (United States) Thomas Walkup | 4 | 4 | 5 |
| PG | 3 | (Greece) Naz Mitrou-Long | DNP | | |
| SG | 5 | (Greece) Giannoulis Larentzakis | DNP | | |
| PG | 8 | (Argentina) Luca Vildoza | 4 | 0 | 0 |
| SF | 16 | (Greece) Kostas Papanikolaou | 0 | 1 | 1 |
| PF | 25 | (United States) Alec Peters | 2 | 1 | 0 |
| C | 30 | (Serbia) Filip Petrušev | 18 | 8 | 0 |
Head coach:
(Hellenic Basketball Federation) Georgios Bartzokas

== Awards ==
=== Finals Most Valuable Player ===
| Player | Team |
|---|---|
| (Bulgaria) Sasha Vezenkov | Olympiacos |

=== Finals Top Scorer ===
| Player | Team |
|---|---|
| (Bulgaria) Sasha Vezenkov | Olympiacos |
