= 2025 Greek Basketball Super Cup =

2025 Greek Super Cup
- Season: 2025-26
- Duration: 26–27 September 2025
- Teams: 4

Finals
- Champions: Olympiacos (4th title)
- Runners-up: Promitheas Patras
- Final Four MVP: (Greece) Tyler Dorsey

The 2025 Greek Basketball Super Cup was the 6th edition of the revived Greek professional basketball Super Cup competition, under the auspices of the Hellenic Basketball Clubs Association (HEBA), and the 7th overall. The tournament was played from 26 to 27 September in Rhodes, Greece. Olympiacos won the title for the fourth consecutive season.

Panathinaikos Athens announced that they would not be able to compete in the tournament, citing a scheduling conflict with the Pavlos Giannakopoulos Tournament to be held in Australia, and submitted a proposal to change the dates of the Supercup matches, which was rejected at a HEBA board meeting with a vote of 4-8 and one abstention. The possible penalty for Panathinaikos due to their withdrawal from the competition was a fine of 20,000 euros and their exclusion from the following year's edition. As a result, AS Karditsa was selected as their replacement.

== Format ==
The competition will be played in a final-four format and single elimination games, between the teams placed in the four first places of the 2024–25 Greek Basket League, which include the 2024–25 Greek Basketball Cup winner and finalist.

=== Qualified teams ===
The following four teams qualified for the tournament.

| Team | Method of qualification | Appearance | Previous appearances |
|---|---|---|---|
| Olympiacos | 2024–25 Greek League Champion, 2024–25 Greek Cup Runners-Up, 2024 Greek Super Cup Winner | 4th | 2022, 2023, 2024 |
| AEK Athens | 2024–25 Greek League 3rd place | 3rd | 2020, 2021 |
| Promitheas Patras | 2024–25 Greek League 4th place | 4th | 2020, 2021, 2022 |
| AS Karditsa* | 2024–25 Greek League 5th place | 1st | None |

- Karditsa replaced Panathinaikos who were unable to compete due to scheduling conflict .

== Bracket ==
Semifinals; 26 September 2025
AEK Athens | 70
Promitheas Patras | 84
Olympiacos | 89
AS Karditsa | 56

Finals; 27 September 2025
Promitheas Patras | 83
Olympiacos | 92

== Semifinals ==
| 26 September 2025 | AEK | 70–84 | Promitheas Patras | Rhodes |
| 17:15 | Scoring by quarter: 14–24, 23–18, 18–19, 15–23 |
| | | Boxscore | Pts: Gray 30; Rebs: Karagiannidis 4 Asts: McCallum 7 | Arena: Kallithea Palais des Sports |

| 26 September 2025 | Olympiacos | 89–56 | AS Karditsa | Rhodes |
| 20:30 | Scoring by quarter: 21–17, 26–5, 23–16, 19–18 |
| | Pts: Vezenkov 16; Rebs: Vezenkov 7 Asts: Walkup 6 | Boxscore | | Arena: Kallithea Palais des Sports |

== Final ==
The first title of the 2025-26 season went to Olympiacos. The champions defeated Promitheas Patras 92-83 in the Stoiximan Super Cup final in Rhodes, claiming the trophy for the fourth consecutive year. Tyler Dorsey was the game's top scorer with 23 points, while Sasha Vezenkov scored 16. On the other side, Nasos Bazinas scored 17 points, and both McCullum and Paulicap scored 14.

=== Olympiacos vs. Promitheas Patras ===
| 27 September 2025 | Olympiacos | 92–83 | Promitheas Patras | Rhodes |
| 20:00 | Scoring by quarter: 26–17, 23–19, 21–17, 22–30 |
| | Pts: Dorsey 23; Rebs: Milutinov 8 Asts: Fournier 5 | Boxscore | Pts: Bazinas 17; Rebs: Paulicap 7 Asts: McCullum 8 | Arena: Kallithea Palais des Sports; Referees: Tsimpouris; Tiganis; Marinakis |

| Starters: | | | Pts | Reb | Ast |
|---|---|---|---|---|---|
| PG | 0 | (United States) Thomas Walkup | 11 | 2 | 4 |
| SG | 22 | (Greece) Tyler Dorsey | 23 | 4 | 1 |
| SF | 94 | (France) Evan Fournier | 5 | 3 | 5 |
| PF | 14 | (Bulgaria) Sasha Vezenkov | 16 | 3 | 1 |
| C | 33 | (Serbia) Nikola Milutinov | 6 | 8 | 4 |
| Reserves: | | | | | |
| SF | 3 | (United States) Tyson Ward | 3 | 0 | 3 |
| SG | 9 | (United States) Saben Lee | 2 | 0 | 0 |
| SF | 16 | (Greece) Kostas Papanikolaou | 7 | 2 | 2 |
| SG | 21 | (Greece) Omiros Netzipoglou | 0 | 0 | 0 |
| PF | 25 | (United States) Alec Peters | 8 | 1 | 1 |
| C | 37 | (Greece) Kostas Antetokounmpo | DNP | | |
| C | 45 | (Azerbaijan) Donta Hall | 11 | 5 | 2 |
Head coach:
(Hellenic Basketball Federation) Georgios Bartzokas

| Olympiacos | Promitheas Patras |

| Olympiacos | Statistics | Promitheas |
|---|---|---|
| 20/37 (54.1%) | 2-pt field goals | 21/41 (51.2%) |
| 11/27 (40.7%) | 3-pt field goals | 8/21 (38.1%) |
| 19/22 (86.4%) | Free throws | 17/22 (77.3%) |
| 10 | Offensive rebounds | 9 |
| 21 | Defensive rebounds | 19 |
| 31 | Total rebounds | 28 |
| 25 | Assists | 16 |
| 17 | Turnovers | 15 |
| 8 | Steals | 9 |
| 4 | Blocks | 3 |
| 21 | Fouls | 23 |

2025 Greek Super Cup winners
Olympiacos
(4th title)

| Starters: | | | Pts | Reb | Ast |
|---|---|---|---|---|---|
| PG | 1 | (United States) Kendall McCullum | 14 | 2 | 8 |
| SG | 32 | (United States) Rashard Gray | 9 | 3 | 2 |
| PG | 7 | (Greece) Nasos Bazinas | 17 | 1 | 2 |
| PF | 11 | (United States) De'Vondre Hammonds | 8 | 4 | 1 |
| C | 23 | (United States) Pauly Paulicap | 14 | 7 | 0 |
| Reserves: | | | | | |
| C | 4 | (United States) Kendal Coleman | 11 | 6 | 1 |
| SG | 9 | (Greece) Nikos Plotas | 5 | 2 | 1 |
| SF | 77 | (Greece) Stavros Stavrakopoulos | 3 | 1 | 0 |
| SF | 12 | (Greece) Antonis Lagios | 2 | 2 | 1 |
| SG | 17 | (Greece) Grigoris Prekas | 0 | 0 | 0 |
| PG | 19 | (Greece) Ioannis Komnianidis | DNP | | |
| PF | 6 | (Greece) Dimitrs Stamoulos | DNP | | |
Head coach:
(Hellenic Basketball Federation) Ilias Papatheodorou

== Awards ==
=== Finals Most Valuable Player ===
| Player | Team |
|---|---|
| (Greece) Tyler Dorsey | Olympiacos |

=== Finals Top Scorer ===
| Player | Team |
|---|---|
| (Greece) Tyler Dorsey | Olympiacos |
