= 2023 Greek Basketball Super Cup =

2023 Greek Super Cup
- Season: 2023-24
- Duration: 29–30 September 2023
- Teams: 4

Finals
- Champions: Olympiacos (2nd title)
- Runners-up: Panathinaikos OPAP
- Final Four MVP: (Greece) Giannoulis Larentzakis

Statistical leaders
Points	(Greece) Giannoulis Larentzakis	28
Rebounds	(United States) Nate Renfro	16
Assists	(Greece) Thomas Walkup	12

The 2023 Greek Basketball Super Cup is the 4th edition of the revived Greek professional domestic basketball Supercup competition, under the auspices of the Hellenic Basketball Clubs Association (HEBA), and the 5th overall. The Greek Basketball Supercup had been played only four times before, in 1986 under the auspices of the Hellenic Basketball Federation (E.O.K.), in 2020, 2021, and 2022. All games were hosted in Kallithea Palais des Sports in Rhodes, Greece.

Olympiacos won the 2023 Greek Super Cup.

== Format ==
The competition will be played in a final-four format and single elimination games, between the teams placed in the four first places of the 2022–23 Greek Basket League, which include the 2022–23 Greek Basketball Cup winner and finalist.

=== Qualified teams ===
The following four teams qualified for the tournament.

Team	Method of qualification	Appearance	Last appearance
Olympiacos	2022–23 Greek League Champion, 2022–23 Greek Cup Winner, 2022 Greek Super Cup Winner	2nd	2022
Panathinaikos OPAP	2022–23 Greek League Runners-Up, 2022–23 Greek Cup Runners-Up, 2022 Greek Super Cup Runners-Up	5th	1986, 2020, 2021, 2022
Peristeri	2022–23 Greek League 3rd Place	3rd	2020, 2022
PAOK	2022–23 Greek League 4th Place	1st	None

== Bracket ==
Semifinals; 29 September 2023
Peristeri	64
Olympiacos	84
PAOK	64
Panathinaikos OPAP	77

Finals; 30 September 2023
Olympiacos	75
Panathinaikos OPAP	51
Third place
Peristeri	64
PAOK	49

== Semifinals ==
29 September 2023	Peristeri bwin	64–84	Olympiacos	Rhodes
17:00	Scoring by quarter: 20–22, 16–24, 14–17, 14–21
		Boxscore	Pts: Milutinov 16; Rebs: Milutinov 10; Asts: Walkup 6	Arena: Kallithea Palais des Sports

29 September 2023	PAOK	64–77	Panathinaikos OPAP	Rhodes
20:30	Scoring by quarter: 18–22, 4–16, 23–26, 19–13
		Boxscore	Pts: Lessort 20; Rebs: Lessort 7 Asts: Sloukas 4	Arena: Kallithea Palais des Sports

== Final ==
30 September 2023	Olympiacos	75–51	Panathinaikos	Rhodes
20:30	Scoring by quarter: 16–4, 21–7, 19–23, 19–17
	Pts: Larentzakis 20; Rebs: Sikma 9 Asts: Walkup 8	Boxscore	Pts: Hernangómez 15; Rebs: Sloukas 6 Asts: Grant 4	Arena: Kallithea Palais des Sports; Referees: Papapetrou; Tsaroucha; Kapranos

Starters:			Pts	Reb	Ast
PG	0	(United States) Thomas Walkup	2	7	8
SG	3	(United States) Isaiah Canaan	12	1	2
SF	16	(Greece) Kostas Papanikolaou	5	5	1
PF	25	(United States) Alec Peters	4	10	0
C	33	(Serbia) Nikola Milutinov	10	4	0
Reserves:					
SG	4	(Greece) Giannoulis Larentzakis	20	2	2
PG	9	(Greece) Michalis Lountzis	5	0	0
PF	43	(United States) Luke Sikma	4	9	2
SF	77	(United States) Shaquielle McKissic	8	0	0
C	5	(Greece) Georgios Tanoulis	5	2	1
Head coach:
(Hellenic Basketball Federation) Georgios Bartzokas

Olympiacos	Panathinaikos

Olympiacos	Statistics	Panathinaikos
17/30 (56.6%)	2-pt field goals	14/33 (42.4%)
10/29 (34.4%)	3-pt field goals	6/24 (25.0%)
11/15 (73.3%)	Free throws	5/11 (45.4%)
12	Offensive rebounds	9
32	Defensive rebounds	22
44	Total rebounds	31
18	Assists	10
14	Turnovers	17
8	Steals	7
2	Blocks	2
19	Fouls	19

2023 Greek Super Cup winners
Olympiacos
(2nd title)

Starters:			Pts	Reb	Ast
PG	10	(Greece) Kostas Sloukas	9	6	2
SG	22	(United States) Jerian Grant	14	1	4
SF	33	(Greece) Ioannis Papapetrou	5	2	1
PF	41	(Spain) Juancho Hernangomez	15	6	0
C	26	(France) Mathias Lessort	8	1	0
Reserves:					
SG	2	(United States) Kyle Guy	0	1	1
SF	0	(Greece) Panagiotis Kalaitzakis	DNP		
PG	21	(Greece) Dimitris Moraitis	0	0	0
PF	11	(Greece) Lefteris Mantzoukas	0	2	0
C	77	(Poland) Aleksander Balcerowski	0	4	0
Head coach:
(Turkish Basketball Federation) Ergin Ataman

== Awards ==
=== Finals Most Valuable Player ===
Player	Team
(Greece) Giannoulis Larentzakis	Olympiacos

=== Finals Top Scorer ===
Player	Team
(Greece) Giannoulis Larentzakis	Olympiacos
