= Shaquielle McKissic =

American-Azerbaijani basketball player

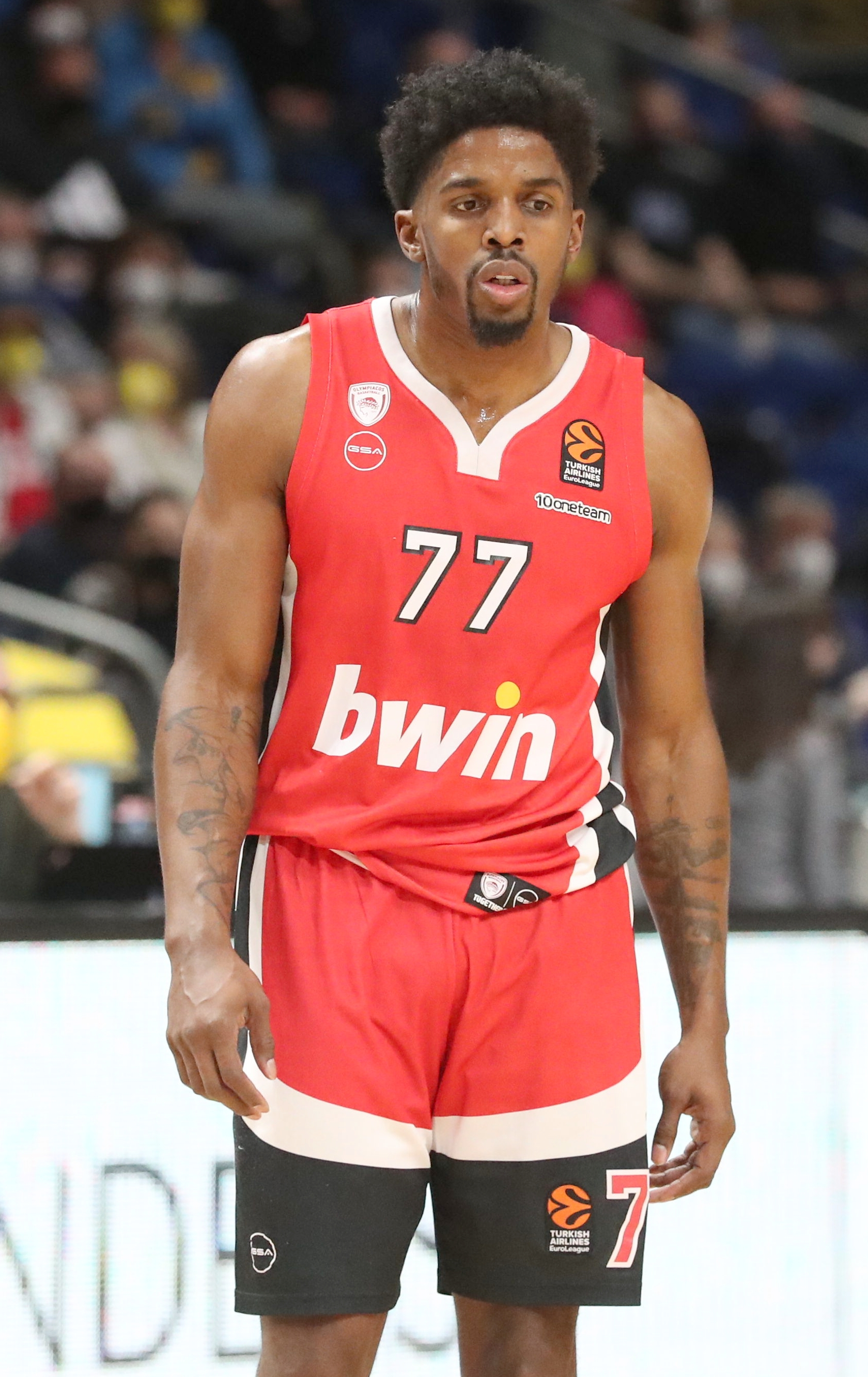
- McKissic with Olympiacos, in 2022

No. 77 – Türk Telekom
- Position: Small forward / shooting guard
- League: BSL; EuroCup

Personal information
- Born: August 17, 1990 (age 36) Indiana, U.S.
- Listed height: 6 ft 5 in (1.96 m)
- Listed weight: 212 lb (96 kg)

Career information
- High school: Kentridge (Kent, Washington)
- College: Edmonds CC (2009–2010, 2012–2013); Arizona State (2013–2015)
- NBA draft: 2015: undrafted
- Playing career: 2015–present

Career history
- 2015: Pesaro
- 2015–2016: Changwon LG Sakers
- 2016–2017: Uşak Sportif
- 2017: Gran Canaria
- 2017–2018: Avtodor Saratov
- 2018–2019: Gaziantep
- 2019–2020: Beşiktaş
- 2020–2026: Olympiacos
- 2026–present: Türk Telekom

Career highlights
- EuroLeague champion (2026); 4× Greek League champion (2022, 2023, 2025, 2026); 3× Greek Cup winner (2022–2024); 4× Greek Supercup winner (2022–2025); 3× Turkish Super League All-Star (2017, 2019, 2020)

Shaquielle O'Neal McKissic (born August 17, 1990), is an American-born naturalized Azerbaijani professional basketball player for Türk Telekom of the Turkish Basketbol Süper Ligi (BSL) and the EuroCup.

== Early life ==
McKissic was born in Indiana to a single mother and never met his biological father. His mother married a pastor when he was aged 12 and McKissic moved with them to Seattle, Washington. Although his mother moved back to Indiana after a divorce due to a domestic dispute, McKissic stayed in Washington and attended Kentridge High School in Kent.

== Collegiate career ==
In the 2009–10 and 2012–13 season, McKissic played for Edmonds Community College. In 2013, McKissic started playing for the Arizona State Sun Devils. In his final season, he averaged 12.4 points and 4.7 rebounds per game for the Sun Devils.

== Professional career ==
In July 2015, McKissic joined Victoria Libertas Pesaro of the Italian Serie A.

On December 7, 2015, McKissic signed with the Changwon LG Sakers of the South Korean KBL. In his season in South Korea, he averaged 16.1 points per game in the KBL.

In June 2016, McKissic signed with Muratbey Uşak Sportif in Turkey.

On June 29, 2017, McKissic signed a one-year deal with Gran Canaria. On December 6, 2017, he parted ways with Gran Canaria after averaging 5.5 points per game in the Liga ACB, due to disciplinary reasons after alleging a confrontation with coach Luis Casimiro. Six days later, he signed with Russian club Avtodor Saratov for the rest of the 2017–18 season.

On July 5, 2019, McKissic signed a one-year contract with Beşiktaş Sompo Japan of the Turkish Basketball Super League (BSL). On February 1, 2020, McKissic opted out of his contract with the club. He averaged 16.6 points per game in the Champions League, along with 17.6 points in the BSL.

On February 10, 2020, McKissic signed with Olympiacos Piraeus of the EuroLeague. On February 7, 2021, he signed a two-year extension with the team. On April 11, 2023, McKissic agreed on another two-year contract extension through 2025.

On July 2, 2025, McKissic signed for one final season with the Reds through 2026.

On July 1, 2026, he signed with Türk Telekom of the Turkish Basketbol Süper Ligi (BSL).

== National team career ==
In June 2017, McKissic received an Azerbaijani passport and he then became a member of the senior Azerbaijan national basketball team.

== Awards and accomplishments ==
Olympiacos Piraeus

- EuroLeague Champion (2026)
- EuroLeague Finalist: (2023)
- 5× EuroLeague Final Four Participation: (2022, 2023, 2024, 2025, 2026)
- 3× Greek League Champion: (2022, 2023, 2025)
- 3× Greek Cup Winner: (2022, 2023, 2024)
- 4× Greek Super Cup Winner: (2022, 2023, 2024, 2025)

=== Individual ===
- 3× Turkish Super League All-Star: (2017, 2019, 2020)
- All-Pac-12 Honorable Mention: (2015)

== Personal life ==
McKissic portrayed high school basketball star Doug “Easy” Ryder in the 2011 film Rock Paper Scissors. On May 7, 2019, he married his wife, Beril McKissic, in Gaziantep, Turkey. They have two children: a son, Foreign-Jermaine (born 2021), and a daughter, Amili-Nady (born 2025).

== Career statistics ==
Legend
GP	Games played	GS	Games started	MPG	Minutes per game
FG%	Field-goal percentage	3P%	3-point field-goal percentage	FT%	Free-throw percentage
RPG	Rebounds per game	APG	Assists per game	SPG	Steals per game
BPG	Blocks per game	PPG	Points per game	PIR	Performance index rating
**Bold**	Career high

=== EuroLeague ===
*	Led the league

Year	Team	GP	GS	MPG	FG%	3P%	FT%	RPG	APG	SPG	BPG	PPG	PIR
2019–20	Olympiacos	3	3	**26.0**	**.529**	.273	.400	2.0	1.7	1.0	**.7**	**13.7**	**10.3**
2020–21	Olympiacos	33	**12**	23.4	.429	.307	.716	**2.3**	**2.2**	**1.5**	.2	10.7	9.8
2021–22	Olympiacos	37	0	16.5	.457	.316	**.722**	1.9	1.5	.9	.1	7.0	7.5
2022–23	Olympiacos	**41***	7	17.7	.514	.319	.684	1.4	1.5	.8	.0	9.0	8.9
2023–24	Olympiacos	32	0	16.3	.470	**.346**	.712	1.6	1.0	1.0	—	7.3	6.8
Career		146	22	18.6	.469	.319	.704	1.8	1.6	1.0	.1	8.6	8.3

=== EuroCup ===
Year	Team	GP	GS	MPG	FG%	3P%	FT%	RPG	APG	SPG	BPG	PPG	PIR
2017–18	Gran Canaria	6	5	14.3	.464	.417	.667	1.7	1.0	.5	.2	7.2	8.0
Career		6	5	14.3	.464	.417	.667	1.7	1.0	.5	.2	7.2	8.0

=== Basketball Champions League ===
Year	Team	GP	GS	MPG	FG%	3P%	FT%	RPG	APG	SPG	BPG	PPG
2016–17	Uşak Sportif	9	8	**32.8**	.455	.208	.594	**4.6**	1.3	**2.4**	**.3**	15.6
2019–20	Beşiktaş	**13**	**10**	30.0	**.467**	**.361**	**.765**	4.0	**2.8**	2.1	—	**16.6**
Career		22	18	31.1	.462	.289	.710	4.2	2.2	2.2	.1	16.2

=== FIBA Europe Cup ===
Year	Team	GP	GS	MPG	FG%	3P%	FT%	RPG	APG	SPG	BPG	PPG
2016–17	Uşak Sportif	4	4	35.1	.429	.381	.846	4.2	2.7	1.7	—	13.7
Career		4	4	35.1	.429	.381	.846	4.2	2.7	1.7	—	13.7

=== Domestic leagues ===
Year	Team	League	GP	MPG	FG%	3P%	FT%	RPG	APG	SPG	BPG	PPG
2015–16	(Italy) Victoria Libertas	LBA	9	30.3	.436	.408	.750	5.2	1.4	1.3	.2	15.9
2015–16	(South Korea) Changwon Sakers	KBL	28	25.5	.449	.345	.718	5.2	2.0	1.4	.1	16.1
2016–17	(Turkey) Uşak Sportif	TBSL	26	33.5	.493	.349	.699	5.7	2.9	1.4	.0	15.8
2017–18	(Spain) Gran Canaria	ACB	10	17.4	.479	.250	.556	1.7	1.4	1.1	.1	5.5
2017–18	(Russia) Avtodor Saratov	VTBUL	18	21.7	.449	.196	.606	2.4	1.8	1.1	.1	8.5
2018–19	(Turkey) Gaziantep	TBSL	31	30.2	.547	.277	.693	3.2	2.3	1.6	.3	13.5
2019–20	(Turkey) Beşiktaş	TBSL	17	32.4	.530	.316	.750	4.4	3.2	1.4	.1	17.6
2021–22	(Greece) Olympiacos	GBL	27	18.0	.543	.426	.700	1.9	2.0	1.1	—	9.5
2022–23	(Greece) Olympiacos	GBL	24	18.7	.492	.413	.600	1.7	1.6	.9	.1	7.7
2023–24	(Greece) Olympiacos	GBL	16	18.4	.444	.260	.514	2.2	2.5	.7	—	6.4
2024–25	(Greece) Olympiacos	GBL	11	17.8	.466	.333	.737	1.9	1.5	1.2	—	7.1

=== College ===
Year	Team	GP	GS	MPG	FG%	3P%	FT%	RPG	APG	SPG	BPG	PPG
2013–14	Arizona State	32	26	28.7	**.474**	.328	.658	**5.4**	**2.6**	1.3	—	9.0
2014–15	Arizona State	**34**	**34**	**31.2**	.437	**.339**	**.674**	4.7	1.7	**1.6**	**.2**	**12.4**
Career		66	60	30.0	.451	.335	.667	5.0	2.2	1.5	.1	10.8
