= Georgios Bartzokas =

Greek professional basketball player and coach

- Bartzokas, while coaching Olympiacos Piraeus, in 2026

Olympiacos
- Title: Head coach
- League: Greek Basketball League; EuroLeague

Personal information
- Born: June 11, 1965 (age 61) Athens, Greece
- Listed height: 2.00 m (6 ft 7 in)
- Listed weight: 90.9 kg (200 lb)

Career information
- High school: 1st Marousi
- NBA draft: 1987: undrafted
- Playing career: 1981–1992
- Position: Power forward / center
- Coaching career: 1987–present

Career history

Playing
- 1981–1992: Maroussi

Coaching
- Pefki
- Vrilissia Basket
- 2000–2004: GS Kifissias
- 2004–2005: Irakleio
- 2003–2006: Maroussi (assistant)
- 2006–2009: Olympia Larissa
- 2009–2010: Maroussi
- 2010–2012: Panionios
- 2012–2014: Olympiacos
- 2015–2016: Lokomotiv Kuban
- 2016–2017: FC Barcelona
- 2017–2019: Khimki
- 2020–present: Olympiacos

Career highlights
- As head coach: 2× EuroLeague champion (2013, 2026); FIBA Intercontinental Cup champion (2013); 4× Greek League champion (2022, 2023, 2025, 2026); 3× Greek Cup winner (2022–2024); 5× Greek Super Cup winner (2022–2026); 3× EuroLeague Coach of the Year (2013, 2022, 2023); 3× Greek League Coach of the Year (2010, 2023, 2026)

Georgios Bartzokas (alternate spellings: Giorgos, George, Mpartzokas) (Greek: Γιώργος Μπαρτζώκας, born June 11, 1965) is a Greek former professional basketball player, and the current head basketball coach for Olympiacos of the Greek Basketball League (GBL) and the EuroLeague. During his career as a head coach, Bartzokas (a.k.a. "Chess player") has won numerous titles. With the Greek club Olympiacos Piraeus, he won the World Club Championship title, as he won the 2013 edition of the FIBA Intercontinental Cup. He also won the championship of Europe's premiere club competition, the EuroLeague, at the 2013 EuroLeague Final Four, with Olympiacos, a feat he would eventually repeat in 2026, again with Olympiacos. Bartzokas has been named the EuroLeague Coach of the Year three times, as he won the award in the years 2013, 2022, and 2023.

== Youth career and early life ==
Bartzokas was born on 11 June 1965, in Athens, Greece. At a young age, he first played the sport of football. In 1977, at the age of 12, he began playing the sport of basketball, with the youth teams of the Greek basketball club Maroussi Athens. He remained in Maroussi's youth teams until 1981.

== Professional career ==
After spending four years with the youth teams of Maroussi Athens, Bartzokas joined Maroussi's senior men's club in 1981, at the age of 16. Bartzokas, a 2.00 m (6 ft 7 in) tall power forward-center, made his senior level debut in the Greek 2nd Division (B) league, during the 1981–82 season. Bartzokas went on to play club basketball with Maroussi Athens, in both the Greek 2nd Division (A2) and Greek 3rd Division (B) leagues, until 1992. During his tenure with the club, he was the team's leading scorer and team captain.

Bartzokas' playing career ended at the age of 27, after he had suffered serious knee injuries to both of his legs. He first suffered a torn right knee ACL injury, and then later on he also suffered a torn left knee ACL injury. Prior to his knee injuries, the Greek clubs AEK Athens and Olympiacos Piraeus had considered signing him.

== Coaching career ==
=== Early coaching career ===
Bartzokas originally began working as an assistant basketball coach in Greece, in 1987, at the age of 22, while he was still also actively playing club basketball. After he retired from his playing career, Bartzokas first worked as a head coach in the Greek clubs Pefki, Vrilissia Basket, GS Kifissias, and OFI Irakleio. With Vrilissia Basket, he earned two league promotions. With Kifissias, he earned one league promotion.

In 2003, while he was still coaching Kifissias, Bartzokas also began working as an assistant coach in the top-tier level Greek First Division, with his former playing club, Maroussi Athens. Bartzokas worked as an assistant with Maroussi, under the team's head coach at the time, Panagiotis Giannakis, from the 2002–03 season to the 2005–06 season. With Maroussi, Bartzokas was a finalist of the European-wide third-level competition, the FIBA Europe League, in the 2003–04 season. He was also a 2003–04 Greek League season finalist, and a 2006 Greek Cup finalist with Maroussi.

=== Olympia Larissa ===
Prior to the 2006–07 season, Bartzokas signed on as the head coach of the Greek club Olympia Larissa. That same season with Olympia, he managed to reach the playoffs of the 2006–07 Greek Basketball League. That was the first time in the club's history that they had made the league's playoffs. Olympia Larissa eventually finished in seventh place in the league overall. As a result, Bartzokas was named the 2007 Greek League Coach of the Year. Bartzokas then repeated the Greek League playoffs qualification with Olympia the next year, during the 2007–08 season.

=== Maroussi Athens ===
For the 2009–10 season, Bartzokas became the head coach of the Greek club Maroussi Athens. Under Bartzokas' leadership, Maroussi managed to qualify for the Top 16 Phase of the EuroLeague's 2009–10 season. In Greek domestic competition, Maroussi finished in third place in the Greek League's 2009–10 season. Bartzokas was named the Greek League Best Coach of that same season.

=== Panionios Athens ===
Bartzokas became the head coach of the Greek club Panionios Athens, prior to the 2010–11 season. Panionios finished the Greek League 2010–11 season in ninth place. In the following season, under the guidance of Bartzokas, Panionios finished in third place in the Greek League's 2011–12 season. As a result, Bartzokas was named the 2012 Greek League Coach of the Year.

=== Olympiacos Piraeus ===
Bartzokas became the head coach of the Greek EuroLeague club Olympiacos Piraeus, in June 2012, prior to the 2012–13 season. With Olympiacos, Bartzokas won the 2012–13 season's championship of the EuroLeague, at the 2013 London EuroLeague Final Four, where Olympiacos' Vassilis Spanoulis was named the 2013 EuroLeague Final Four MVP. In the process, Bartzokas became the first Greek coach in history to win the championship of the EuroLeague.

After winning the EuroLeague championship, Bartzokas was named the 2013 EuroLeague Coach of the Year. With Olympiacos, Bartzokas also managed to win the championship of the FIBA Intercontinental Cup, which is the official World Club Championship. He led Olympiacos to the world club title at the 2013 Intercontinental Cup, where they defeated the champions of the 2013 FIBA Americas League, the Brazilian NBB club Pinheiros, in a two game, aggregate score series, by a score of 167–139. Olympiacos' Spanoulis was named the 2013 FIBA Intercontinental Cup MVP. Bartzokas was named the Eurobasket News All-Europe Coach of the Year in 2013.

=== Lokomotiv Kuban ===
On July 5, 2015, Bartzokas signed a 2-year deal with the Russian club Lokomotiv Kuban of the VTB United League and the EuroLeague. In the EuroLeague, he coached the team to its first-ever Final Four appearance, as they qualified to the 2016 EuroLeague Final Four, after they beat the Spanish Liga ACB club FC Barcelona, by a series score of 3–2, in the 2016 EuroLeague Playoffs. Bartzokas was named the VTB United League Coach of the Year, of the 2015–16 season.

=== Barça ===
On July 8, 2016, Bartzokas signed a three-year contract with the Spanish ACB team FC Barcelona. With Barça, Bartzokas won the 2016 Catalan League championship. After one season with the club, Barcelona parted ways with him.

=== Khimki Moscow Region ===
On June 30, 2017, Bartzokas returned to the VTB United League, in order to become the new head coach of the Russian club Khimki Moscow Region. He signed a two-year contract with the club. With Khimki, Bartzokas won the Gomelsky Cup tournament in 2017. On 21 January 2019, Bartzokas left Khimki, after his contract with the club was terminated.

=== Return to Olympiacos ===
On January 10, 2020, Barzokas returned to the Greek club Olympiacos Piraeus, after he signed a 2 1/2-year deal with them. After two months as the club's head coach, the 2019–20 season was cancelled, due to the COVID-19 pandemic situation. In the following 2020–21 season, Bartzokas tried to rebuild the team's roster, after Kostas Sloukas returned to the team. However, Olympiacos didn't qualify for the playoff round of the EuroLeague's 2020–21 season. In the 2021–22 season, Bartzokas won the 2022 Greek Cup title with Olympiacos. That was Bartzokas' first Greek national domestic title. Shortly after that, he also won the 2022 Greek League championship. While in the EuroLeague's 2021–22 season, he qualified with Olympiacos to the 2022 Belgrade Final Four, in which they finished in the fourth place. Bartzokas was named the 2022 EuroLeague Coach of the Year.

Bartzokas won the 2022 Greek Super Cup title. After that, Bartzokas led Olympiacos to the 2023 Greek Cup title, and to the 2023 Greek League championship. He was named the 2023 Greek League Coach of the Year. Olympiacos also made it to the 2023 EuroLeague Final Four, where they were ultimately defeated by the Spanish club Real Madrid, by a score of 79–78, in the EuroLeague Final. Bartzokas was named the 2023 EuroLeague Coach of the Year.

Bartzokas also won the 2023 Greek Super Cup and 2024 Greek Cup titles.

He eventually won his second EuroLeague title with Olympiacos (and 4th for the club as a whole) in 2026, defeating Real Madrid and led Olympiacos to the 2026 Greek League title, their 16th championship overall.

== Bartzokas Ball ==
"Bartzokas Ball" is the internationally recognized term established by EuroLeague Basketball itself to describe the pioneering basketball philosophy of the Greek coach, Georgios Bartzokas. This playing style is implemented with massive success at Olympiacos and is based on masterful, lightning-fast ball movement, absolute unselfish collaboration (passing the ball), and the creation of open shots without relying on a single player. Players are drilled to never let the ball stick in their hands. They constantly look for the "extra pass"—giving up a good shot to a teammate in order to secure a perfect shot.The system enforces strict, disciplined floor spacing. By perfectly occupying the corners and the wings, the offense stretches the defense to its absolute limits. This mathematically generates high-percentage open look three-pointers and clear driving lanes.The fluid offense is entirely fueled by a suffocating, physical half-court defense. Bartzokas demands elite ball pressure and disciplined defensive rotations. Forcing tough shots or turnovers allows the team to instantly transition into their secondary break before the defense can set up.

== Personal life ==
Bartzokas is an Orthodox Christian, and in 2026 he visited Tinos and prayed to the Panagia of Tinos.

Bartzokas' family hails from the Greek village of Kentriko, Arta. His father Andreas (1925–2015), was a member of the Greek KKE political party, and he was a political prisoner during the 1950s and 1960s. Bartzokas has stated he is proud of his father who "fought for his beliefs and for humanity, for socialism." Bartzokas is married to architect Athena Triantafillou, with whom they have a daughter.

== Coaching record ==
Legend
G	Games coached	W	Games won	L	Games lost	W–L %	Win-loss %

Note: The EuroLeague is not the only competition in which the team played during the season. He also coached in domestic competition, and regional competition if applicable.

=== EuroLeague ===
Team	Year	G	W	L	W–L%	Result
Maroussi	2009–10	16	6	10	.375	Eliminated in Top 16 stage
Olympiacos
Olympiacos	2012–13	31	22	9	.710	Won EuroLeague Championship
Olympiacos	2013–14	29	20	9	.690	Eliminated in quarterfinals
Lokomotiv Kuban	2015–16	31	21	10	.677	Won in 3rd place game
Barcelona	2016–17	30	12	18	.400	Eliminated in the regular season
Khimki	2017–18	34	17	17	.500	Eliminated in quarterfinals
Khimki	2018–19	19	7	12	.368	Parted ways mid-season
Olympiacos	2019–20	10	5	5	.500	Season Cancelled
Olympiacos	2020–21	34	16	18	.471	Eliminated in Regular Season
Olympiacos	2021–22	35	22	13	.629	4th place
Olympiacos	2022–23	41	28	13	.683	2nd place
Olympiacos	2023–24	41	26	15	.634	Won in 3rd place game
Olympiacos	2024–25	40	28	12	.700	Won in 3rd place game
Olympiacos	2025–26	43	31	12	.721	Won EuroLeague Championship
Career		432	259	173	.600	

== Awards and accomplishments ==
=== Titles won ===
- 2× EuroLeague Champion: 2013, 2026 (with Olympiacos Piraeus)
- FIBA Intercontinental Cup Champion: 2013 (with Olympiacos Piraeus)
- 4× Greek League Champion: 2022, 2023, 2025, 2026 (with Olympiacos Piraeus)
- 3× Greek Cup Winner: 2022, 2023, 2024 (with Olympiacos Piraeus)
- 5× Greek Super Cup Winner: 2022, 2023, 2024, 2025, 2026 (with Olympiacos Piraeus)

=== Other honors ===
- EuroLeague Final Finalist: 2023 (with Olympiacos Piraeus)
- 7× EuroLeague Final Four Participation: 2013, 2022, 2023, 2024, 2025, 2026 (with Olympiacos Piraeus); 2016 (with Lokomotiv Kuban)
- EuroLeague SuperCup Finalist: 2026 (with Olympiacos Piraeus)
- 2× VTB United League Finalist: 2018, 2019 (with Khimki Moscow region)
- 3× Greek League Finalist: 2013, 2014, 2024 (with Olympiacos Piraeus)
- 3× Greek Cup Finalist: 2013, 2025, 2026 (with Olympiacos Piraeus)
- Spanish Supercup Finalist: 2016 (with FC Barcelona)

=== Individual awards and accomplishments ===
- 3× EuroLeague Coach of the Year: 2013, 2022, 2023
- Eurobasket News All-Europe Coach of the Year: 2013
- 3× Greek League Coach of the Year: 2010, 2023, 2026

=== Records ===
- The head coach with the most titles in the history of Olympiacos Piraeus.
- The head coach with the most wins in the history of Olympiacos Piraeus, in the EuroLeague.
- The head coach with the most EuroLeague Final Four appearances in the history of Olympiacos Piraeus, in the EuroLeague.
- The head coach with the most appearances in the history of Olympiacos Piraeus, in the EuroLeague.
- The head coach with the most wins in the history of Olympiacos Piraeus, in the Greek League.
- The head coach with the most appearances in the history of Olympiacos Piraeus, in the Greek League.

=== Other honors as an assistant coach ===
- FIBA Europe League Finalist: 2004 (with Maroussi Athens)
- Greek League Finalist: 2004 (with Maroussi Athens)
- Greek Cup Finalist: 2006 (with Maroussi Athens)

== See also ==
- List of EuroLeague-winning head coaches
