= Giannoulis Larentzakis =

Greek basketball player (born 1993)

Giannoulis Larentzakis Γιαννούλης Λαρεντζάκης
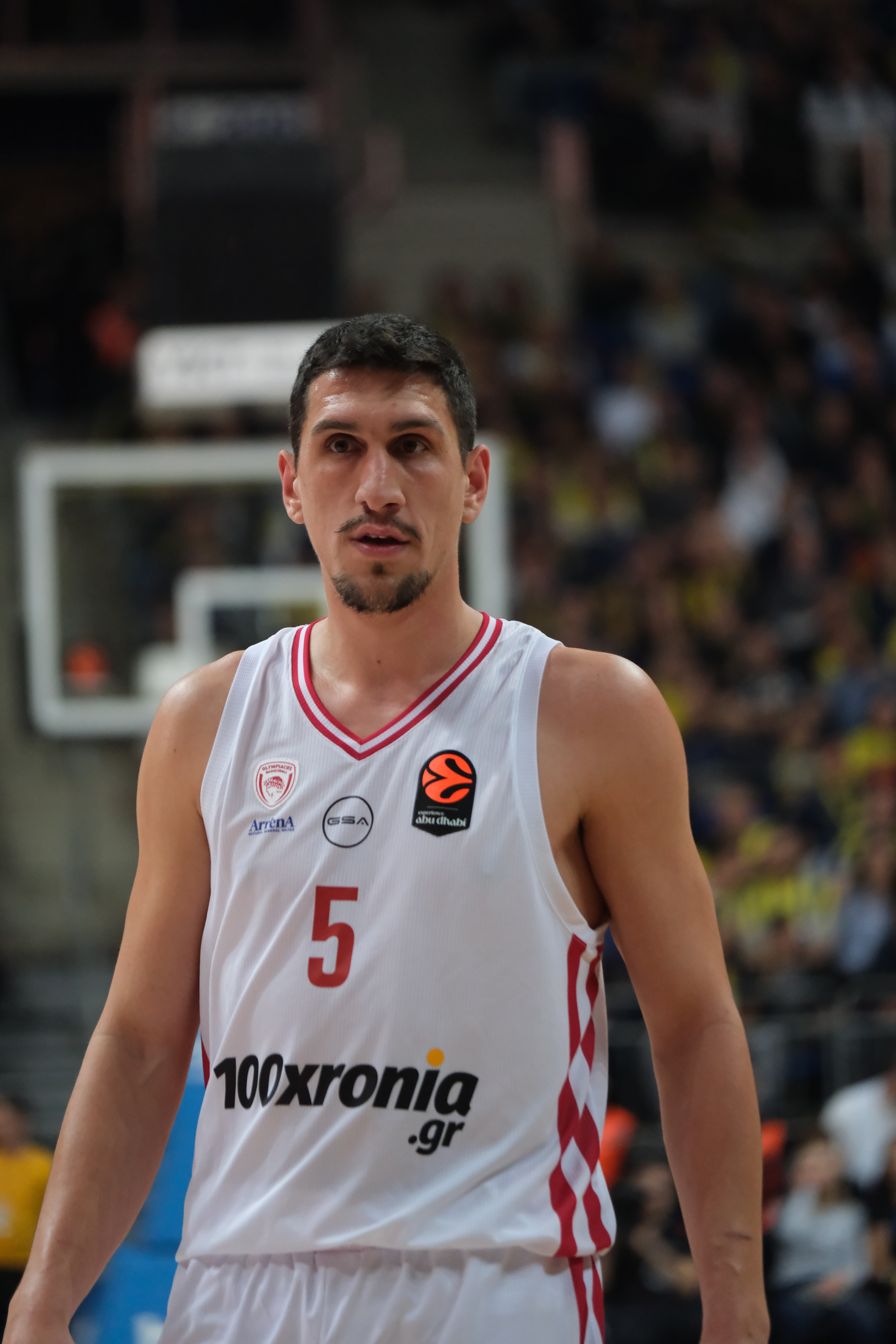
- Larentzakis with Olympiacos in 2026

No. 5 – AEK Athens
- Position: Small forward / shooting guard
- League: GBL; EuroLeague

Personal information
- Born: 22 September 1993 (age 33) Maroussi, Attica, Greece
- Listed height: 6 ft 5 in (1.96 m)
- Listed weight: 210 lb (95 kg)

Career information
- Playing career: 2010–present

Career history
- 2010–2011: Aigaleo
- 2011–2013: Ikaros Kallitheas
- 2013–2016: Aris Thessaloniki
- 2014–2016: →Kolossos Rodou
- 2016–2019: AEK Athens
- 2019–2020: Murcia
- 2020–2026: Olympiacos
- 2026–present: AEK Athens

Career highlights
- EuroLeague champion (2026); FIBA Intercontinental Cup champion (2019); FIBA Champions League champion (2018); 4× Greek League champion (2022, 2023, 2025, 2026); 4× Greek Cup winner (2018, 2022–2024); 4× Greek Super Cup winner (2022–2025); Greek Super Cup Finals MVP (2023); 3× Greek All-Star (2019, 2022, 2023); All-Panhellenic Youth League Team (2012)
Medals
Men's basketball
Representing Greece
EuroBasket
Bronze medal – third place	2025 Cyprus–Finland–Poland–Latvia

Giannoulis Larentzakis (Greek: Γιαννούλης Λαρεντζάκης, born 22 September 1993) is a Greek professional basketball player for AEK Athens of the Greek Basketball League (GBL) and the Basketball Champions League (BCL). Nicknamed the "Cobra", he is 1.96 m (6 ft 5 in) tall and plays the small forward and shooting guard positions. Larentzakis has been a member of the senior Greek national basketball team since 2017.

== Early life and career ==
Larentzakis was born in Maroussi, Athens, Greece, on 22 September 1993. As a youth, he grew up on the Greek island of Kythnos. He began playing basketball with the youth clubs of PAO Amilla Peristeriou. In 2010, at the age of 17, he joined the senior men's team of Aigaleo. He played with the club in the Greek 3rd Division's 2010–11 season.

== Professional career ==
Larentzakis began his professional career with the Greek League club Ikaros, during the 2011–12 season. In 2013, he moved to the Greek club Aris, signing a three-year contract with the team. On 28 August 2014 he moved to the Greek club Kolossos Rodou, on loan from Aris.

On 28 July 2015 it was announced that Larentzakis would continue his loan spell, for another year, with Kolossos. In 27 games played with Kolossos, during the Greek League 2015–16 season, he averaged 11.9 points, 4.2 rebounds, 2.9 assists, and 1.4 steals per game. On 24 May 2016 Larentzakis signed a four-year contract with the Spanish club CAI Zaragoza, of the Spanish ACB League.

On 9 June 2016 Greek club AEK Athens paid Larentzakis' €25,000 buyout to CAI Zaragoza, and signed him to a four-year contract. With AEK, he won the title, 2018 edition of the Greek Cup, and the FIBA Champions League's 2017–18 season championship. On 17 October 2018, in a 2018–19 FIBA Champions League season game, Larentzakis scored a career high against the Czech Republic club ČEZ Nymburk, as he scored 23 points. In the same game, he also had 4 rebounds and 3 assists, while shooting 7 of 8 from the three-point line. On 25 July 2019 Larentzakis and AEK mutually parted ways, forfeiting the last year of his contract.

In September 2019, Larentzakis signed a two-year contract with the Spanish ACB League club Murcia.

In July 2020, Larentzakis signed with Greek League club Olympiacos on a three-year deal. On July 21, 2023, he renewed his contract with Olympiacos through 2026.

On 16 July 2025, Larentzakis and Olympiacos agreed upon a new three-year (2+1) contract with a reduced salary.

He left the club on September 6, 2026. On the same date, he rejoined AEK Athens.

== National team career ==
=== Greek junior national team ===
Larentzakis played at the 2011 FIBA Europe Under-18 Championship, the 2012 FIBA Europe Under-20 Championship, and the 2013 FIBA Europe Under-20 Championship with the junior national teams of Greece.

=== Greek senior national team ===
Larentzakis became a member of the senior Greek national basketball team in 2017. With Greece, he played at the 2019 FIBA European World Cup qualification tournament, and also at the 2019 FIBA World Cup.

In September, Larentzakis also participated in the EuroBasket 2022 with Greece. Coming off the bench, he averaged 6.1 points, 1 rebound and 0.6 assists on 10.1 minutes a game. His best game was against Germany during the knockout stage, where he, despite the team's loss of 107–96, put up 18 points, 4 rebounds and 1 assist in 17 minutes.

== Personal life ==
Larentzakis' personal nicknames include "Lary" and "Cobra". His family originates from the Greek island of Kythnos.

== Awards and accomplishments ==
=== Pro career ===
AEK Athens

- FIBA Intercontinental Cup Champion: (2019)
- FIBA Champions League Champion: (2018)
- Greek Cup Winner: (2018)

Olympiacos

- EuroLeague Champion (2026)
- 5× EuroLeague Final Four Participation: (2022, 2023, 2024, 2025, 2026)
- 4× Greek League Champion: (2022, 2023, 2025, 2026)
- 3x Greek Cup Winner: (2022, 2023, 2024)
- 4x Greek Super Cup Winner (2022, 2023, 2024, 2025)

=== Greek national team ===
- 2025 EuroBasket: Bronze

=== Individual ===
- All-Panhellenic Youth League Team (2012)
- 3× Greek League All-Star (2019, 2022, 2023)
- Greek Super Cup Finals MVP (2023)
- Greek Super Cup Finals Top Scorer (2023)

== Career statistics ==
Legend
GP	Games played	GS	Games started	MPG	Minutes per game
FG%	Field-goal percentage	3P%	3-point field-goal percentage	FT%	Free-throw percentage
RPG	Rebounds per game	APG	Assists per game	SPG	Steals per game
BPG	Blocks per game	PPG	Points per game	PIR	Performance index rating
**Bold**	Career high

=== EuroLeague ===
*	Led the league

Year	Team	GP	GS	MPG	FG%	3P%	FT%	RPG	APG	SPG	BPG	PPG	PIR
2020–21	Olympiacos	21	**2**	12.4	.354	.328	.760	1.6	1.4	**.8**	—	4.5	3.5
2021–22	Olympiacos	34	1	11.4	.359	.316	**.833**	1.4	1.1	.3	.0	4.2	2.6
2022–23	Olympiacos	**41***	0	**14.4**	**.408**	**.374**	.729	**1.8**	1.0	.5	.0	**6.4**	**4.8**
2023–24	Olympiacos	37	0	13.1	.341	.321	.808	1.0	**1.5**	.6	**.1**	5.1	3.8
Career		133	3	13.0	.371	.340	.779	1.4	1.2	.5	.0	5.2	3.8

=== Basketball Champions League ===
Year	Team	GP	GS	MPG	FG%	3P%	FT%	RPG	APG	SPG	BPG	PPG
2016–17	AEK Athens	18	13	16.4	**.468**	**.368**	.815	2.9	1.4	1.1	**.1**	6.0
2017–18	AEK Athens	**19**	**17**	21.8	.365	.313	.821	2.2	1.2	1.1	—	7.2
2018–19	AEK Athens	18	5	**22.9**	.392	.308	**.857**	**3.9**	**2.6**	**1.7**	**.1**	**9.8**
Career		55	35	20.3	.400	.322	.833	3.0	1.7	1.3	.1	7.7

=== Domestic leagues ===
Year	Team	League	GP	MPG	FG%	3P%	FT%	RPG	APG	SPG	BPG	PPG
2011–12	(Greece) Ikaros Kallitheas	HEBA A1	12	8.8	.444	.333	.778	.7	.2	.3	—	3.7
2012–13	(Greece) Ikaros Kallitheas	HEBA A1	19	12.3	.269	.297	.882	1.5	1.1	.5	—	4.0
2013–14	(Greece) Aris Thessaloniki	GBL	14	7.5	.415	.263	.444	.8	.6	.3	—	3.1
2014–15	(Greece) Kolossos Rodou	GBL	28	14.7	.404	.246	.659	2.6	1.4	.6	.1	7.1
2015–16	(Greece) Kolossos Rodou	GBL	27	23.1	.390	.277	.762	4.2	2.9	1.4	.0	11.8
2016–17	(Greece) AEK Athens	GBL	35	16.5	.407	.300	.675	2.3	1.7	1.0	.1	5.3
2017–18	(Greece) AEK Athens	GBL	27	20.5	.382	.336	.667	2.5	1.3	.7	.1	7.6
2018–19	(Greece) AEK Athens	GBL	34	23.8	.399	.303	.820	2.8	3.0	1.3	.2	10.9
2019–20	(Spain) UCAM Murcia	ACB	19	18.4	.372	.272	.837	2.8	2.5	.5	.1	8.7
2021–22	(Greece) Olympiacos	GBL	32	16.0	.511	.466	.889	2.0	2.5	.9	.1	8.5
2022–23	(Greece) Olympiacos	GBL	30	16.8	.458	.376	.735	2.0	2.3	1.2	.1	8.7
2023–24	(Greece) Olympiacos	GBL	31	15.3	.390	.342	.837	1.7	1.5	.5	—	6.9
