= Tyson Ward =

American basketball player (born 1997)

- Ward with Olympiacos in 2026

No. 3 – Olympiacos
- Position: Small forward / shooting guard
- League: GBL; EuroLeague

Personal information
- Born: July 26, 1997 (age 29) Tampa, Florida, U.S.
- Listed height: 6 ft 6 in (1.98 m)
- Listed weight: 185 lb (84 kg)

Career information
- High school: Tampa Prep (Tampa, Florida)
- College: North Dakota State (2016–2020)
- NBA draft: 2020: undrafted
- Playing career: 2020–present

Career history
- 2020–2021: s.Oliver Würzburg
- 2021–2023: Telekom Baskets Bonn
- 2023–2025: Paris Basketball
- 2025–present: Olympiacos

Career highlights
- EuroLeague champion (2026); EuroCup champion (2024); FIBA Champions League champion (2023); Greek League champion (2026); 2× Greek Super Cup winner (2025, 2026); LNB Élite champion (2025); French Cup winner (2025); French League Cup winner (2024); First-team All-Summit League (2020)

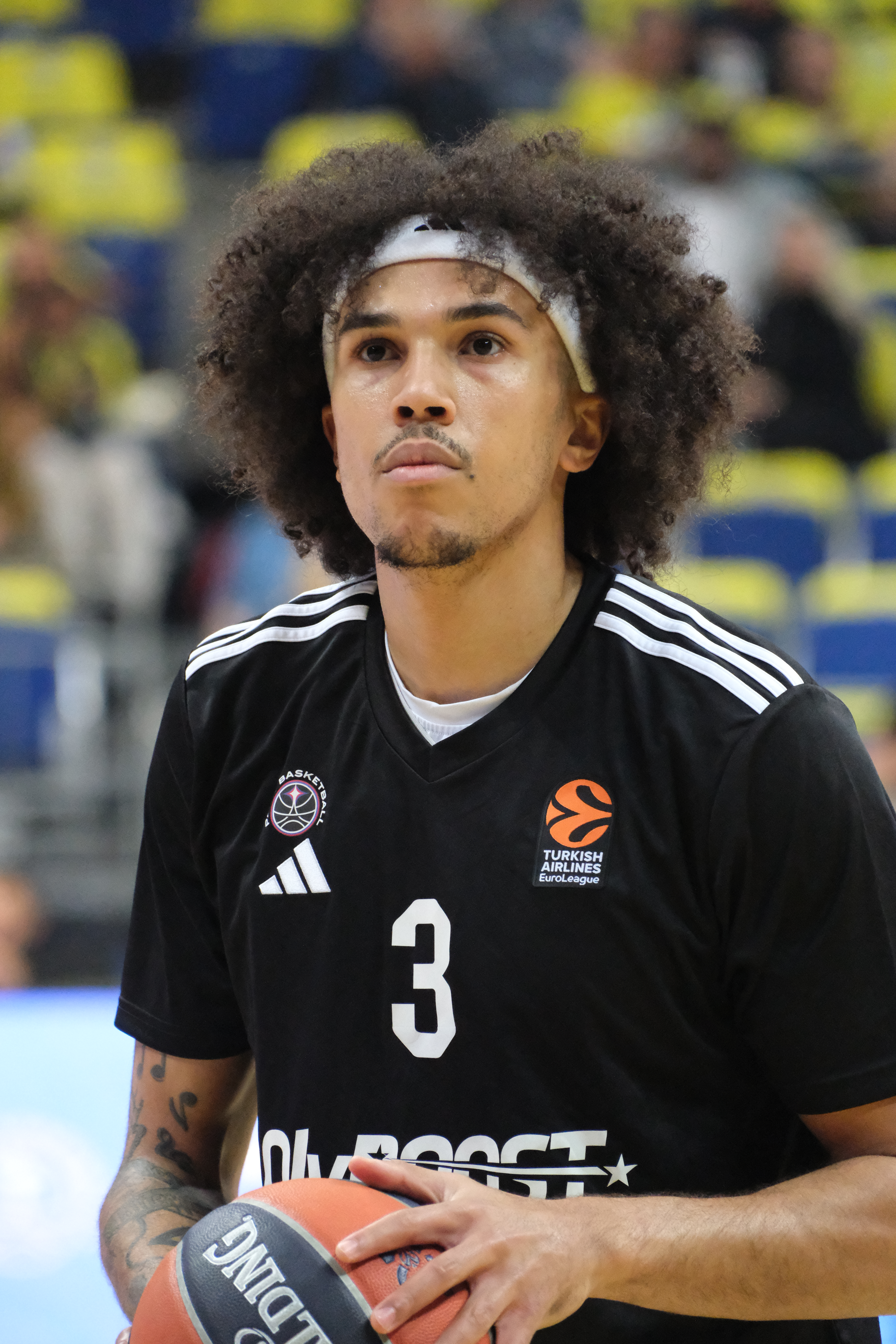
Ward with Paris Basketball in 2025

Tyson Christopher Ward (born July 26, 1997) is an American professional basketball player for Olympiacos of the Greek Basketball League and the EuroLeague. He played college basketball for North Dakota State.

== High school career ==
Ward attended Tampa Prep, where he was frequently overshadowed by his teammate, Juwan Durham. As a junior, Ward scored 21 points to lead Tampa Prep to a 56–41 victory over Seffner Christian in the Class 3A, District 7 final. During their senior season, Durham tore his ACL, and Ward was counted on for more scoring. Ward contributed 31 points in a 73–70 loss to Windermere Prep in the Class 3A region final. He averaged 16.4 points, 7.4 rebounds, and 4.2 assists per game. Ward was named to the first-team All-State. He was mainly recruited by Coastal Carolina and Charleston Southern, but was impressed by North Dakota State coach David Richman during a recruiting visit in March 2016 and committed to the Bison.

== College career ==
Ward scored a freshman season-high 22 points in an overtime loss to IUPUI. He averaged 5.8 points and 3.1 rebounds per game as a freshman at North Dakota State. As a sophomore, Ward averaged 11.8 points, 5.9 rebounds, and 2.6 assists per game. Ward scored 15 points and grabbed seven rebounds in a 73–63 win over Omaha in the Summit League Tournament Championship and was named to the All-Tournament Team. He followed up this performance by scoring 23 points in a 2019 NCAA Tournament First Four win over North Carolina Central. Ward averaged 12.4 points, 6.2 rebounds, and 2.3 assists per game as a junior. Coming into his senior season, Ward gave up using social media to focus on academics and basketball. On February 29, 2019, he scored a career-high 29 points shooting 4-of-4 from three-point range in an 87–67 win over Omaha. As a senior, Ward averaged 16.9 points and 7.2 rebounds per game. He was named to the First Team All-Summit League and All-District 12 Second Team by the National Association of Basketball Coaches. Ward helped North Dakota State finish 25–8 and win the Summit League regular season and tournament championship. He finished his college career as the only player in program history with more than 1,500 points, 700 rebounds and 250 assists.

== Professional career ==
On July 28, 2020, Ward signed with s.Oliver Würzburg of the Basketball Bundesliga.

On June 29, 2021, he signed with Telekom Baskets Bonn of the Basketball Bundesliga (BBL), coached by Tuomas Iisalo. In his second season with the Germans, Ward won the 2022-23 Basketball Champions League.

On July 19, 2023, he followed coach Iisalo and signed with Paris Basketball of the LNB Élite. Ward won the 2023-24 EuroCup with the Parisians, earning the team a spot in the 2024-25 EuroLeague.

On 27 June 2025, Ward signed with Greek team Olympiacos of the EuroLeague. Olympiacos paid €300,000 for contract buyout to Paris. On December 10, 2025, Ward suffered a bone edema in the anterior part of the lateral tibial condyle which would cause him to miss some games.

== Career statistics ==
Legend
GP	Games played	GS	Games started	MPG	Minutes per game
FG%	Field-goal percentage	3P%	3-point field-goal percentage	FT%	Free-throw percentage
RPG	Rebounds per game	APG	Assists per game	SPG	Steals per game
BPG	Blocks per game	PPG	Points per game	PIR	Performance index rating
**Bold**	Career high

†	Denotes season in which Ward won the EuroCup
†	Denotes season in which Ward won the Champions League

=== EuroLeague ===
Year	Team	GP	GS	MPG	FG%	3P%	FT%	RPG	APG	SPG	BPG	PPG	PIR
2024–25	Paris Basketball	38	38	26.2	.589	.332	.759	4.9	1.3	.9	.2	11.0	11.3
Career		38	38	26.2	.589	.332	.759	4.9	1.3	.9	.2	11.0	11.3

=== EuroCup ===
Year	Team	GP	GS	MPG	FG%	3P%	FT%	RPG	APG	SPG	BPG	PPG	PIR
2023–24†	Paris Basketball	23	23	24.5	.670	.362	.868	4.1	1.3	1.2	.2	11.0	12.7
Career		23	23	24.5	.670	.362	.868	4.1	1.3	1.2	.2	11.0	12.7

=== Basketball Champions League ===
Year	Team	GP	GS	MPG	FG%	3P%	FT%	RPG	APG	SPG	BPG	PPG
2022–23†	Baskets Bonn	13	8	21.8	.427	.342	.727	4.2	1.8	1.1	.2	8.1
Career		13	8	21.8	.427	.342	.727	4.2	1.8	1.1	.2	8.1

=== Domestic leagues ===
Year	Team	League	GP	MPG	FG%	3P%	FT%	RPG	APG	SPG	BPG	PPG
2020–21	(Germany) Würzburg Baskets	BBL	33	24.1	.470	.317	.653	4.1	2.6	1.1	.2	9.2
2021–22	(Germany) Baskets Bonn	BBL	27	18.5	.481	.278	.661	4.0	1.0	.9	.3	7.6
2022–23	(Germany) Baskets Bonn	BBL	29	22.2	.475	.360	.716	4.7	1.6	1.2	.3	10.8
2023–24	(France) Paris Basketball	LNB Élite	32	24.0	.479	.361	.719	4.3	1.1	1.2	.3	10.8
2024–25	(France) Paris Basketball	LNB Élite	41	23.2	.469	.413	.740	4.5	1.6	1.1	.3	12.2

=== College ===
Year	Team	GP	GS	MPG	FG%	3P%	FT%	RPG	APG	SPG	BPG	PPG
2016–17	North Dakota State	30	1	19.2	.438	.371	.679	3.1	1.0	.6	.1	5.8
2017–18	North Dakota State	32	26	27.8	.465	.324	.763	5.9	2.6	**.8**	.3	11.8
2018–19	North Dakota State	**34**	28	27.7	.488	.321	.746	6.2	2.3	**.8**	.1	12.4
2019–20	North Dakota State	33	**33**	**31.0**	**.530**	**.410**	**.778**	**7.2**	**2.8**	.7	**.6**	**16.9**
Career		129	88	26.6	.490	.354	.757	5.7	2.2	.7	.3	11.9

== Personal life ==
Ward is the son of Chris Ward, who was the head basketball coach at Hillsborough High School.
