= Danny Agbelese =

American basketball player (born 1990)

No. 1 – Palmer Basket
- Position: Center / power forward
- League: Primera FEB

Personal information
- Born: April 14, 1990 (age 36) Lanham, Maryland
- Listed height: 6 ft 9 in (2.06 m)
- Listed weight: 236 lb (107 kg)

Career information
- High school: Massanutten Military Academy (Woodstock, Virginia)
- College: Collin College (2008–2010); Hampton (2010–2012)
- NBA draft: 2012: undrafted
- Playing career: 2012–present

Career history
- 2012–2013: Esteghlal Qeshm
- 2013: Unión Atlética
- 2013–2014: Wanderers Paysandú
- 2014–2015: Guadalajara
- 2015: Rethymno
- 2015: Ourense
- 2015–2016: Gipuzkoa Basket
- 2016–2017: Enel Brindisi
- 2017: Pau-Orthez
- 2017–2018: Gipuzkoa Basket
- 2018–2019: Holargos
- 2019–2020: Kolossos Rodou
- 2020–2021: Promitheas Patras
- 2021–2022: Real Betis
- 2022: Peristeri
- 2023: Estudiantes
- 2023: Marinos de Anzoátegui
- 2023: Piratas de La Guaira
- 2023–2024: SCMU Craiova
- 2024–2025: CSU Sibiu
- 2025: Al Ahli Doha
- 2025–present: Palmer Basket

Career highlights
- Greek Supercup winner (2020); Greek Supercup Finals MVP (2020); 2x Greek League blocks leader (2019, 2021); 2x Greek League All Star (2019, 2020)

Danny Akintunde Agbelese (born April 14, 1990) is an American-Nigerian professional basketball player for Palmer Basket of the Spanish Primera FEB. After two years at Collin College, and two years at Hampton, Agbelese entered the 2012 NBA draft, but he was not selected in the draft's two rounds. He was named MVP of the Greek Super Cup in 2020.

== High school career ==
Agbelese played high school basketball at Massanutten Military Academy, in Woodstock, Virginia.

== College career ==
After high school, Agbelese played college basketball at Collin College, from 2008 to 2010. After that, he transferred to Hampton, where he stayed until 2012.

== Professional career ==
Agbelese made his first professional footprints in Iran, in the 2012–13 season, with Esteghlal Qeshm. The next year he moved to Uruguay, and joined Union Atletica. During the season, he left the club, and signed with Wanderers Paysandu. At the start of 2014, he agreed with the Spanish club Guadalajara. The same year he also played with the Greek club Rethymno and the Spanish club Ourense.

In the 2015–16 season, he played again in Spain, with Gipuzkoa Basket. In 2016, he signed with the Italian club Enel Brindisi. During the 2017–18 season, he signed with Élan Béarnais in France, but later in the season he left the club, and re-signed with Gipuzkoa Basket. He went on to average 7.5 points and 3.6 rebounds per game.

On August 6, 2018, he joined Holargos of the Greek Basket League. On August 7, 2019, Agbelese agreed to stay in Greece with Kolossos Rodou, joining his Holargos coach, Aris Lykogiannis, there.

On August 11, 2019, he signed with Kolossos Rodou of the Greek Basket League. On July 22, 2020, Agbelese officially moved to his fourth Greek club, Promitheas Patras, which also competes in the EuroCup.

On August 16, 2021, Agbelese signed with Real Betis of the Spanish Liga ACB. In 16 games, he averaged 2.3 points and 2.8 rebounds per contest.

On March 6, 2022, Agbelese moved to Peristeri of the Greek Basket League for the rest of the season. In a total of 11 games, he averaged 4.5 points, 3.6 rebounds, 0.8 assists and 0.8 blocks, playing around 15 minutes per contest.

On October 8, 2024, he signed with CSU Sibiu of Liga Nationala. On January 10, 2025, he left the team as his contract expired.

On November 4, 2025, he signed for Palmer Basket of the Spanish Primera FEB.

== Honours ==
- Greek Basketball Super Cup: (2020)
