= Donta Hall =

American basketball player (born 1997)

- Hall with Olympiacos in 2026

No. 45 – Olympiacos
- Position: Center
- League: GBL; EuroLeague

Personal information
- Born: August 7, 1997 (age 29) Luverne, Alabama, U.S.
- Listed height: 6 ft 10 in (2.08 m)
- Listed weight: 232 lb (105 kg)

Career information
- High school: Luverne (Luverne, Alabama)
- College: Alabama (2015–2019)
- NBA draft: 2019: undrafted
- Playing career: 2019–present

Career history
- 2019–2020: Grand Rapids Drive
- 2020: Detroit Pistons
- 2020: Brooklyn Nets
- 2020–2021: NBA G League Ignite
- 2021: Raptors 905
- 2021: Orlando Magic
- 2021–2024: AS Monaco
- 2024–2025: Baskonia
- 2025–present: Olympiacos

Career highlights
- EuroLeague champion (2026); Greek League champion (2026); 2× Greek Super Cup winner (2025, 2026); 2× LNB Élite champion (2023, 2024); French Cup winner (2023); All-NBA G League Second Team (2020); NBA G League All-Defensive Team (2020); NBA G League All-Rookie Team (2020); 2× SEC All-Defensive team (2018, 2019)
- Stats at NBA.com
- Stats at Basketball Reference

Donta Hall (born August 7, 1997) is an American-born naturalized Azerbaijani professional basketball player for Olympiacos of the Greek Basketball League and the EuroLeague. He played college basketball for the Alabama Crimson Tide.

== Early life ==
Hall grew up in Luverne, Alabama and attended Luverne High School, playing on the Tigers' junior varsity team in eighth grade. Hall's father Donald suffered a fatal heart attack at one of his junior varsity games. He was named first team Class 2A All-State after averaging 11.7 points, 10.1 rebounds and 6.7 blocks per game during his junior season as he led Luverne to a 24–2 record and the State final. Hall was rated the 81st best player in his class by ESPN and committed to play college basketball at Alabama at the end of his junior year over offers from UAB, Mississippi State and Troy. As a senior, Hall averaged a triple-double with 22.6 points, 18.1 rebounds and almost 12 blocks per game and was named the Class 2A Player of the Year in addition to being named first team All-State.

== College career ==
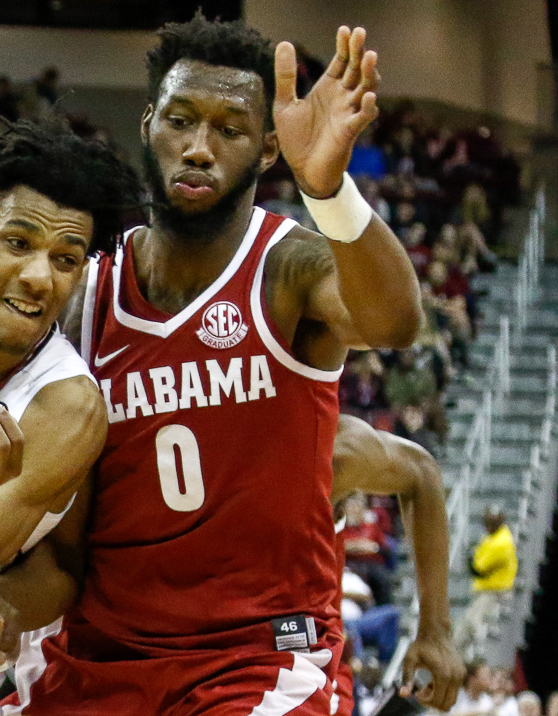
Hall with Alabama in February 2019

As a true freshman, Hall averaged 2.8 points, 4.3 rebounds and 1.7 blocks per game (6th in the Southeastern Conference). He entered the starting lineup for the Crimson Tide in December of his sophomore season, averaging six points, 5.5 rebounds and 1.4 blocks over 34 games (20 starts). As a junior, Hall set an Alabama single-season record, led the SEC, and finished second in the nation with a 72.6 field goal percentage while averaging 10.6 points per game and leading the team with 2.0 blocks (5th in the SEC) and 6.6 rebounds per game and was named to the SEC All-Defensive team.

Hall led the SEC with 8.8 rebounds per game as a senior while also averaging 10.5 points and 1.6 blocks per game. Hall finished his collegiate career with 1,014 points, 850 rebounds, and 228 blocked shots (seventh-most in Alabama history) in 135 games played with 85 starts.

== Professional career ==
=== Grand Rapids Drive (2019–2020) ===
Hall played in the 2019 NBA Summer League as a member of the Detroit Pistons roster and averaged 16.8 minutes, 6.0 points, 5.4 rebounds, 1.6 assists, 1.0 steal and 2.2 blocks per game. Hall signed an Exhibit 10 contract with the Detroit Pistons on July 23, 2019. Hall was waived by the Pistons on October 20, 2019, and subsequently joined the team's NBA G League affiliate, the Grand Rapids Drive, as an affiliate player. On December 31, he missed a game with an undisclosed injury. Hall scored a team-high 24 points and had 12 rebounds, two steals, two blocks and one assist on January 4, 2020, in a 117–113 loss to Raptors 905. Hall was named Midseason All-NBA G League for the Eastern Conference. He averaged 15.4 points and 10.5 rebounds per game, while shooting 66 percent from the field in 36 games with the Drive and was named Second Team All-NBA G League and to the NBA G League All-Defensive Team and the NBA G League All-Rookie Team.

=== Detroit Pistons (2020) ===
On February 22, 2020, the Detroit Pistons signed Hall to a 10-day contract. He was promoted after Markieff Morris reached a buyout agreement with the Pistons. Hall made his debut on February 25, recording four points, four rebounds, and an assist against the Denver Nuggets. Hall was signed to a second 10-day contract on March 3, 2020. Hall played in four games with the Pistons and averaged 1.5 points and 3.8 rebounds in 12.0 minutes per game.

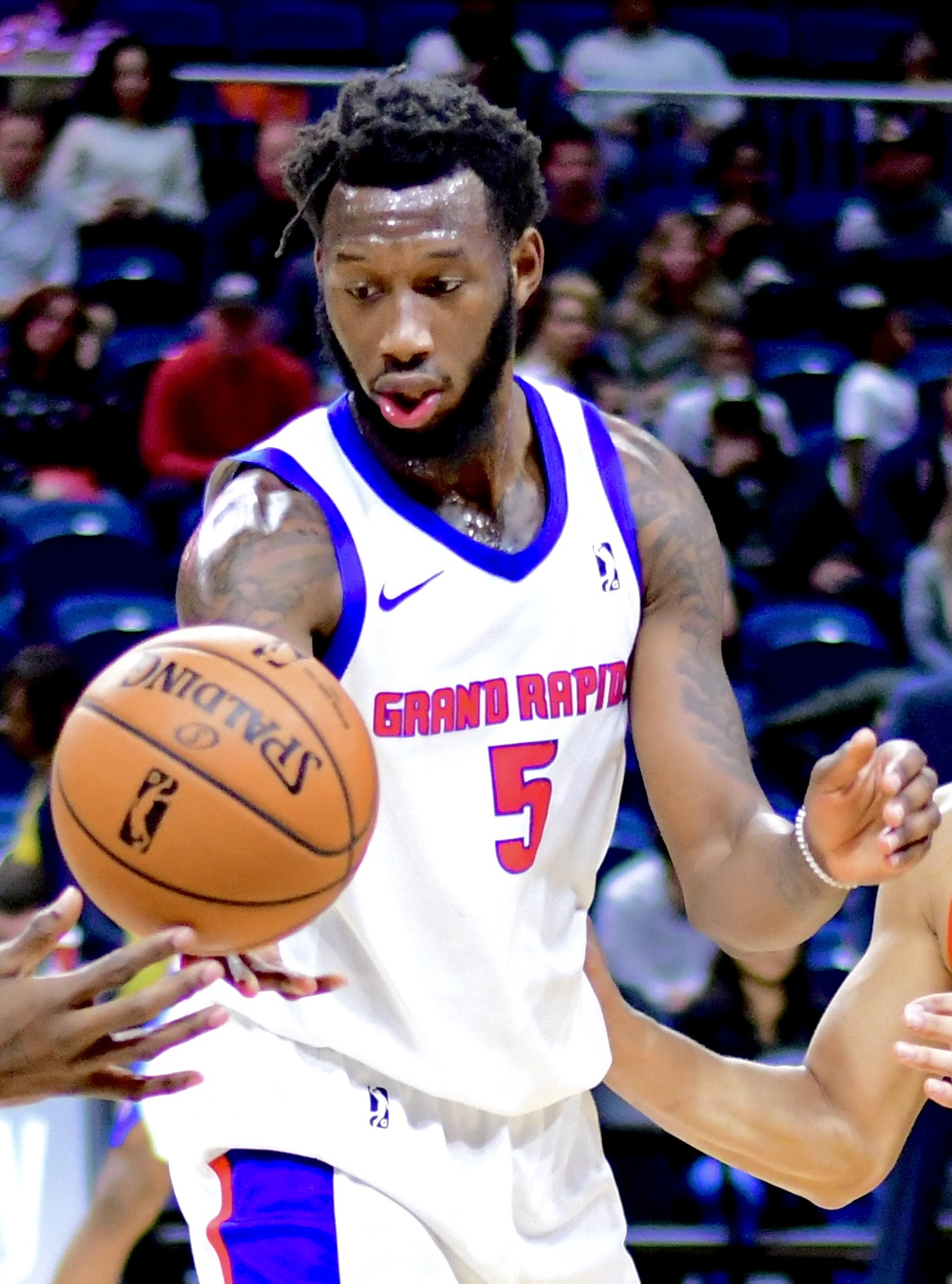
Hall with the Grand Rapids Drive in February 2019

=== Brooklyn Nets (2020) ===
On July 10, 2020, Hall signed with the Brooklyn Nets as a substitute player for the remainder of the season. Hall averaged 6.6 points, 4.6 rebounds and 1.0 blocks in 17.0 minutes played over five seeding games with the Nets in the 2020 NBA Bubble.

=== NBA G League Ignite (2021) ===
On January 14, 2021, the NBA G League Ignite announced that Hall would be added to their roster.

=== Raptors 905 (2021) ===
On February 26, Hall signed a 10-day contract with the Toronto Raptors and was instantly assigned to their affiliate, Raptors 905. On March 3, 2021, Hall was recalled to the Toronto Raptors. By the end of the contract, he had only played for the 905. In 12 games with both Ignite and Raptors 905, he averaged 10.2 points, 8.3 rebounds, 1.5 assists and 2.08 blocks in 24.8 minutes, while shooting .625 (50–80) from the floor.

=== Orlando Magic (2021) ===
On April 13, 2021, Hall signed a 10-day contract with the Orlando Magic. On April 23, he signed a second 10-day contract and was waived On May 2. On May 9, he signed for the rest of the season after the Magic was granted the hardship exception. Hall averaged 5.6 points and 4.8 rebounds per game in 13 games for the Magic.

=== AS Monaco (2021–2024) ===
On August 5, 2021, Hall signed with AS Monaco, his first European club. Hall chose to re-sign with Monaco in 2023 over reported NBA offers.

=== Baskonia (2024–2025) ===
On July 23, 2024, Hall signed with Cazoo Baskonia Vitoria-Gasteiz.

On October 14, 2024, Hall received Hoops Agents Player of the Week award for Round 3. He had the game-high 27 points and 9 rebounds for the team win.

=== Olympiacos (2025–present) ===
On July 17, 2025, Olympiacos paid Baskonia’s buyout for Hall (600.000€) and acquired his rights. On July 19, Hall officially signed a three-year contract (2+1) with Olympiacos.

== Career statistics ==
Legend
GP	Games played	GS	Games started	MPG	Minutes per game
FG%	Field-goal percentage	3P%	3-point field-goal percentage	FT%	Free-throw percentage
RPG	Rebounds per game	APG	Assists per game	SPG	Steals per game
BPG	Blocks per game	PPG	Points per game	PIR	Performance index rating
**Bold**	Career high

=== NBA ===
==== Regular season ====
Year	Team	GP	GS	MPG	FG%	3P%	FT%	RPG	APG	SPG	BPG	PPG
2019–20	Detroit	4	0	12.0	.250	—	.667	3.8	.5	.3	.3	1.5
2019–20	Brooklyn	5	0	**17.0**	**.778**	—	.417	4.6	.4	**.4**	**1.0**	**6.6**
2020–21	Orlando	**13**	0	13.8	.714	—	**.676**	**4.8**	**.8**	**.4**	.8	5.6
Career		22	0	14.2	.702	—	.615	4.5	.7	.4	.7	5.1

==== Playoffs ====
Year	Team	GP	GS	MPG	FG%	3P%	FT%	RPG	APG	SPG	BPG	PPG
2020	Brooklyn	3	0	6.7	.600	—	.250	1.7	.0	.0	.7	2.3
Career		3	0	6.7	.600	—	.250	1.7	.0	.0	.7	2.3

=== EuroLeague ===
*	Led the league

Year	Team	GP	GS	MPG	FG%	3P%	FT%	RPG	APG	SPG	BPG	PPG	PIR
2021–22	Monaco	35	3	18.5	**.765***	.000	**.721**	5.1	.3	**.6**	**1.1**	8.3	12.6
2022–23	Monaco	**41***	4	18.6	.725	.000	.710	**5.5**	.5	.5	.9	7.5	12.3
2023–24	Monaco	38	0	13.6	.740	.000	.607	3.5	.4	.5	.4	4.9	7.9
2024–25	Baskonia	34	**20**	**21.3**	.714	.000	.691	5.4	**.9**	.5	**1.1**	**8.7**	**14.4**
Career		148	27	16.5	.741	.000	.686	4.9	.5	.5	.9	7.3	11.7

=== Domestic leagues ===
Year	Team	League	GP	MPG	FG%	3P%	FT%	RPG	APG	SPG	BPG	PPG
2019–20	(United States) Grand Rapids Gold	G League	38	28.6	.671	.269	.745	10.6	1.0	1.0	1.4	15.4
2020–21	(United States) G League Ignite	G League	9	23.5	.614	.000	.600	9.0	1.6	.4	1.8	8.9
2020–21	(United States) Raptors 905	G League	3	28.6	.652	—	1.000	6.3	1.3	3.0	3.0	14.0
2021–22	(France) Monaco	LNB Élite	24	18.6	.752	—	.694	5.7	.7	.5	.7	8.2
2022–23	(France) Monaco	LNB Élite	29	18.3	.779	—	.678	4.7	.8	.6	.8	7.0
2023–24	(France) Monaco	LNB Élite	40	15.5	.745	—	.570	4.5	.4	.5	.5	5.3
2024–25	(Spain) Baskonia	ACB	34	20.6	.674	—	.703	5.3	.7	.3	1.1	7.3

=== College ===
Year	Team	GP	GS	MPG	FG%	3P%	FT%	RPG	APG	SPG	BPG	PPG
2015–16	Alabama	33	0	12.8	.607	—	.432	4.3	.2	.5	1.7	2.8
2016–17	Alabama	**34**	20	19.7	.658	—	.600	5.5	.5	.5	1.4	6.0
2017–18	Alabama	**34**	31	23.7	**.726**	—	.556	6.6	**.6**	**.7**	**2.0**	**10.6**
2018–19	Alabama	**34**	**34**	**26.8**	.616	**1.000**	**.718**	**8.8**	.5	.5	1.6	10.5
Career		135	85	20.8	.661	1.000	.607	6.3	.5	.5	1.7	7.5

== Personal life ==
In 2023, Hall attained Azerbaijani citizenship.
