= Naz Mitrou-Long =

Canadian basketball player (born 1993)

- Mitrou-Long with PAOK Thessaloniki in 2026

No. 1 – PAOK Thessaloniki
- Position: Shooting guard / point guard
- League: GBL; EuroCup

Personal information
- Born: August 3, 1993 (age 33) Mississauga, Ontario, Canada
- Listed height: 1.93 m (6 ft 4 in)
- Listed weight: 94 kg (207 lb)

Career information
- High school: Father Michael Goetz (Mississauga, Ontario); St. Martin (Mississauga, Ontario)
- College: Iowa State (2012–2017)
- NBA draft: 2017: undrafted
- Playing career: 2017–present

Career history
- 2017: Salt Lake City Stars
- 2017–2019: Utah Jazz
- 2017–2019: →Salt Lake City Stars
- 2019–2020: Indiana Pacers
- 2019–2020: →Fort Wayne Mad Ants
- 2021: Fort Wayne Mad Ants
- 2021–2022: Brescia
- 2022–2023: Olimpia Milano
- 2023: Žalgiris Kaunas
- 2023–2025: Olympiacos
- 2025–2026: Napoli Basket
- 2026–present: PAOK Thessaloniki

Career highlights
- Lega Serie A champion (2023); Lega Serie A Rookie of the Year (2022); Greek League champion (2025); Greek Cup winner (2024); Greek Supercup winner (2024); Second-team All-Big 12 (2017)
- Stats at NBA.com
- Stats at Basketball Reference

Nazareth Jersey Mitrou-Long (born August 3, 1993) is a Canadian–Greek professional basketball player for PAOK Thessaloniki of the Greek Basketball League (GBL) and the EuroCup. He played college basketball for the Iowa State Cyclones. Born in Mississauga, Ontario, he played high school basketball at Father Michael Goetz in his hometown. In 2012, he started playing college basketball for Iowa State. He later played a total of 20 regular-season National Basketball Association (NBA) games with the Utah Jazz and the Indiana Pacers.

== High school career ==
One of the top prospects out of Canada, Long was ranked as the 7th-best player in Canada according to North Pole Hoops. He participated in the 2011 All-Canada Classic, a showcase of the best Canadian basketball players and played for the CIA Bounce AAU program, the top AAU summer circuit in Canada. He played with NBA players Tristan Thompson and Cory Joseph, and future Cyclone teammate Melvin Ejim while competing for REDA Red in the National Prep School Athletic Association in 2011–12. Naz played for Findlay Prep in Las Vegas, Nev., during the 2010–11 season, helping the Prep Pilots to a 28–4 record and their third-straight ESPN Rise National High School Invitational appearance where he was teammates with Texas' Myck Kabongo. He prepped at Montrose Christian (Rockville, Md) in 2009–10, teaming with Duke's Josh Hairston During his recruitment he received offers from Rice, Dayton, Creighton, and Miami, eventually committing to the Iowa State Cyclones.

== College career ==
=== Freshman season ===
Naz saw action in 18 games as a freshman, averaging 1.4 points and 1.0 assists. He tallied seven points vs. Southern and handed out seven assists vs. Alabama A&M.

=== Sophomore season ===
Long played in all 36 games, making seven starts and establishing himself as a clutch 3-point threat. He averaged 7.1 points per game and shot 40 percent from behind the arc, finishing fourth in the Big 12 in 3-point field goal percentage (40.0) and seventh in 3-pointers made (1.8). His 64 3-pointers ranks as the 17th-most by a Cyclone in a single season. He made at least four 3-pointers in seven games. He hit a 30-foot three at the buzzer to send the Cyclones to overtime against Oklahoma State and in ISU's game at Oklahoma State earlier in the season, Long drilled a three to send the game to triple-OT. He earned Phillips 66 Big 12 Player of the Week honors after hitting 8-of-11 3-pointers in the Cyclones' season-opening win against UNC Wilmington and finishing with a career-high 26 points in the game. He went 4-of-6 from long range to score 16 points in the Cyclones' win against No. 7 Michigan. Long played a key role in ISU's Big 12 Tournament run, making 7-of-10 threes and averaging 10 points and going 4-of-6 from behind the arc in the championship game against Baylor. In the third round of the NCAA Tournament, Long hit three 3-pointers in the final 5:10, including one that tied the game at 81, as ISU rallied to defeat North Carolina. He averaged 7.1 points per game and shot 40 percent from behind the arc, finishing fourth in the Big 12 in 3-point field goal percentage (40.0) and seventh in 3-pointers made (1.8). His 64 3-pointers ranks as the 17th-most by a Cyclone in a single season.

=== Junior season ===
Long saw action in all 34 games, making 33 starts and hit four or more threes in a game six times. He scored a team-high 20 points in Iowa State's regular season win against Kansas and connected on 5-of-9 threes to lead Iowa State with 21 points in win at Iowa. He drilled 7-of-10 threes and scored a season-high 24 points against Mississippi Valley State. Naz grabbed a career-high seven boards in win against Texas. He averaged 10.1 points, 2.9 rebounds, and 2.0 assists. He hit a team-high 77 three-pointers, the eighth most in a single season by a Cyclone. He was second in the Big 12 averaging 2.3 three-pointers made per game and finished the season tied for fifth in the league shooting 39.1 percent behind the arc. Naz had ISU's third-longest streak of games with a three-pointer come to an end at 21 games. He shot 44.9 percent from the field despite 77.5 percent of his shots coming from three-point range and is tied for fifth all-time at Iowa State with 146 three-pointers made. Long suffered a labral tears in both of his hips during the season. In the offseason he had separate surgeries to repair each tear.

=== Senior season ===
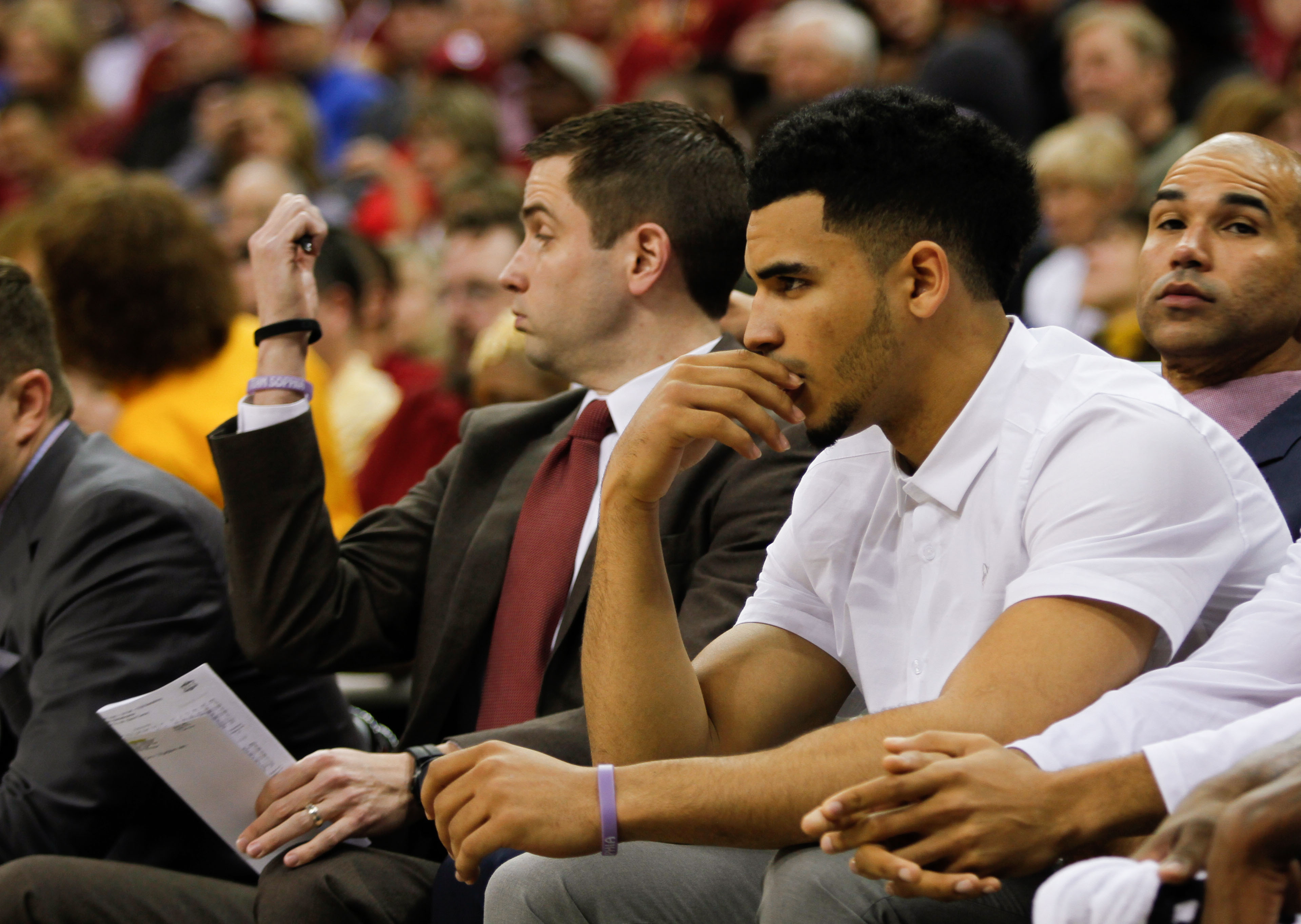
Mitrou-Long had to sit out for most of the 2015–16 season.

Naz played in the first eight games this season for the fifth-ranked Cyclones, averaging 12.0 points in 31.6 minutes. He got a rest against Arkansas–Pine Bluff, with coach Steve Prohm commenting that his situation would be re-evaluated every week. On 15 December 2015, he decided to sit out the rest of the season due to persistent pain from his hip surgeries. Mitrou-Long commented on his decision: "I feel the need to take time off to allow myself to rehab with our training staff to get back to where I can perform at my peak level on the basketball court". Iowa State coach Prohm supported Mitrou-Long's decision to sit out to rehabilitate, while adding his belief that the team could react in a positive manner. Naz was awarded a medical redshirt by the Big 12, thus becoming eligible for the 2016–2017 season.

=== Redshirt senior season ===
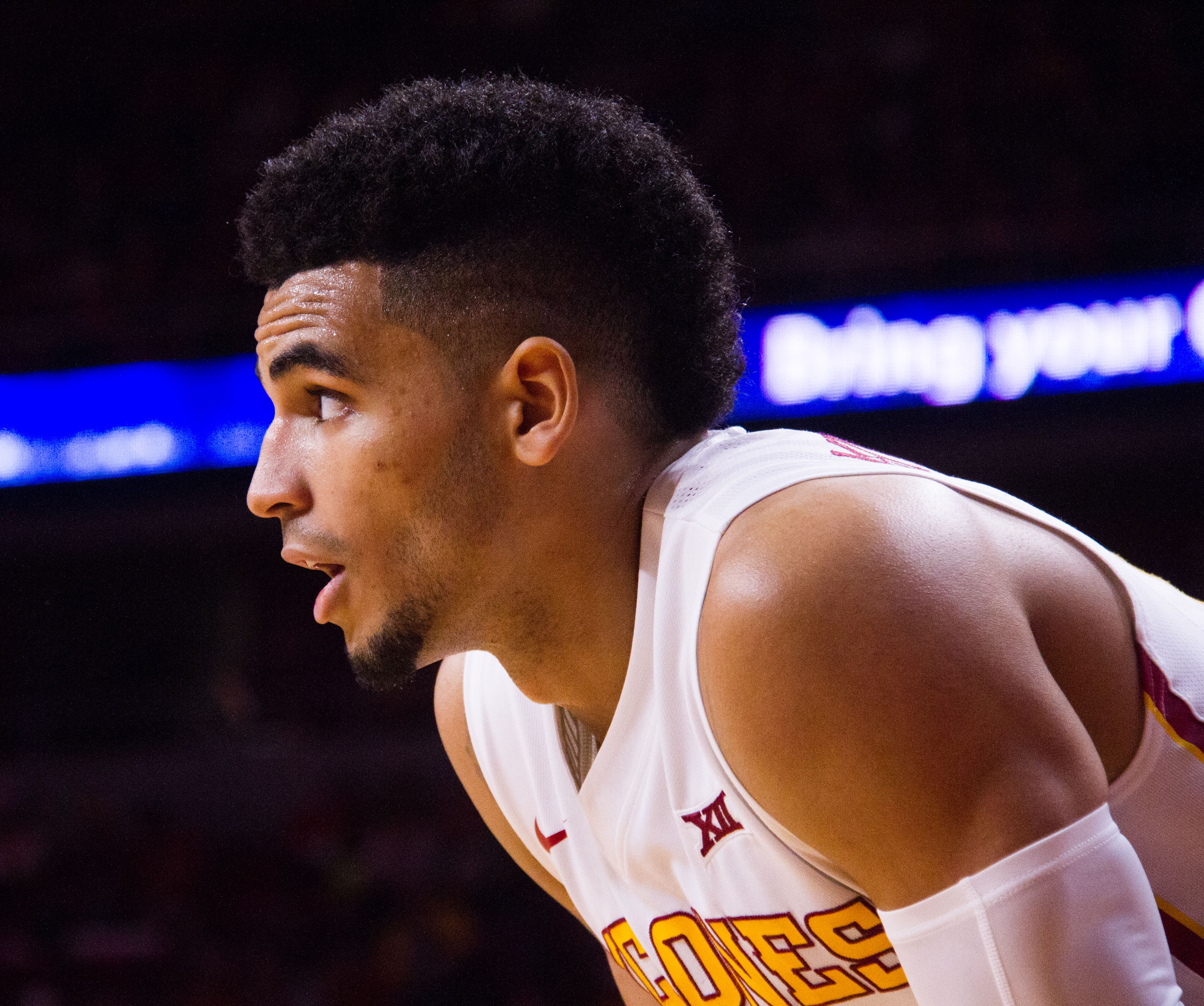
Mitrou-Long with Iowa State in 2016

Going into his redshirt senior season, Long was named in the preseason All-Big 12 Second-Team, receiving praise from coach Prohm for his work ethic, maturity and leadership. Former teammate Jameel McKay commented before the season that Mitrou-Long looked in the best shape of his life, also stating that he could end up Big 12's leading scorer for the season. He started the season strong, posting his first career double-double against the Savannah State Tigers with 18 points and a career best 10 rebounds. Versus Mount St. Mary's Mountaineers, Mitrou-Long played against his younger brother Elijah Long, a sophomore for the Mountaineers; Mitrou-Long said after the game: "Part of me wanted to cheer for him. Part of me was keeping it competitive. It was a little weird, but man it was a good time". Against the Drake Bulldogs, Mitrou-Long set a new career-high in scoring with 37 points on 8 of 12 three-pointers. At the end of his redshirted senior season, Mitrou-Long would be named for the official All-Big 12 Second Team for the work he put in that year for Iowa State.

== Professional career ==
=== Salt Lake City Stars (2017) ===
After going undrafted in the 2017 NBA draft, Mitrou-Long played for the Sacramento Kings in the 2017 NBA Summer League. He later signed with the Utah Jazz for their training camp squad. After getting cut from the team, he was assigned to the Salt Lake City Stars in the NBA G League.

=== Utah Jazz (2017–2019) ===
After showing promising results for his playing in Salt Lake City Stars, on December 22, 2017, Mitrou-Long signed a two-way contract with the Utah Jazz, taking the spot that was originally held by Nate Wolters. This move saw him split playing time between the Jazz and the Stars for the rest of the length of his contract. Mitrou-Long made his NBA debut four days later, recording a three-pointer in a blowout 107–83 loss to the Denver Nuggets. However, on January 13, 2018, Mitrou-Long was waived from the Jazz in order to sign former college teammate Georges Niang. He was re-signed by the Jazz on February 11, 2018, to a 10-day contract. After his first 10-day contract expired on February 21, he signed a second 10-day contract with the Jazz three days later.

=== Salt Lake City Stars (2018–2019) ===
On January 16, 2018, Mitrou-Long was reacquired by the Salt Lake City Stars. He returned to Salt Lake City once again on February 21, 2018, after his 10-day contract expired. Mitrou-Long left Salt Lake City once again for his second 10-day contract with the Utah Jazz, and returned to Salt Lake City after the second 10-day contract expired. He averaged 18.0 points, 6.1 rebounds, and 4.6 assists per game with Salt Lake City. In July 2019, Mitrou-Long joined the Cleveland Cavaliers for the 2019 NBA Summer League.

=== Indiana Pacers (2019–2020) ===
On July 31, 2019, Mitrou-Long signed a two-way contract with the Indiana Pacers. On November 18, 2019, Mitrou-Long scored a career-high 12 points while getting three rebounds, three assists and one steal in a 115–86 win against the Brooklyn Nets. In the G League, he averaged 13.7 points, 6.1 assists and 5.9 rebounds per game. On December 19, Mitrou-Long was waived by the Pacers.

=== Fort Wayne Mad Ants (2021) ===
On January 11, 2021, Mitrou-Long signed with the Fort Wayne Mad Ants of the NBA G League as an affiliate player. He averaged 13.2 points, 4.7 rebounds, 6.0 assists and 1.1 steals per game.

=== Basket Brescia Leonessa (2021–2022) ===
On July 30, 2021, Mitrou-Long signed with Basket Brescia Leonessa of the Lega Basket Serie A. He averaged 17.5 points, 4.3 rebounds and 5 assists per game, leading the team to the 3rd place in the domestic league regular season standings.

=== Olimpia Milano (2022–2023) ===
On June 27, 2022, Mitrou-Long signed a two-year contract with Italian champions Olimpia Milano. On June 27, 2023, he parted ways with the club.

=== Žalgiris Kaunas (2023) ===
On June 27, 2023, Mitrou-Long signed a two-year (1+1) deal with Žalgiris Kaunas of the Lithuanian Basketball League (LKL) and the EuroLeague.

On November 21, 2023, Žalgiris announced that the club is parting ways with Mitrou-Long by mutual decision. He averaged 4.1 points, 1.2 rebounds, 1.0 assist, and 1.8 PIR per game in 9 EuroLeague appearances for Žalgiris.

=== Olympiacos Piraeus (2023–2025) ===
On November 21, 2023, Mitrou-Long signed a three-year contract with Olympiacos of the Greek Basket League and the EuroLeague in anticipation of the acquisition of his Greek passport and citizenship. On December 21 of the same year, Mitrou-Long received his passport and was registered as a domestic player. On July 10, 2025, Mitrou-Long was waived by the Greek club.

=== Napoli Basket (2025–2026) ===
On September 9 of 2025, Mitrou-Long signed with Napoli Basket of the Italian Lega Basket Serie A.

=== PAOK Thessaloniki (2026-) ===
On June 5 of 2026, Mitrou-Long returned again to Greece, after his tenure at Olympiacos, signing a three-year contract with PAOK Thessaloniki of the Greek Basketball League (GBL).

== National team career ==
Mitrou-Long is a member of the senior men's Greek national team. On 13 February 2024, he was called on to represent Greece at the 2025 FIBA EuroBasket qualifiers. On 26 February 2024, he was on Greece's 12 man game roster for their against the Netherlands, but he didn't play in the game, due to a shoulder injury. He made his debut on 21 November 2024 against Great Britain, and he scored 12 points.

== Career statistics ==
Legend
GP	Games played	GS	Games started	MPG	Minutes per game
FG%	Field-goal percentage	3P%	3-point field-goal percentage	FT%	Free-throw percentage
RPG	Rebounds per game	APG	Assists per game	SPG	Steals per game
BPG	Blocks per game	PPG	Points per game	PIR	Performance index rating
**Bold**	Career high

=== NBA ===
==== Regular season ====
Year	Team	GP	GS	MPG	FG%	3P%	FT%	RPG	APG	SPG	BPG	PPG
2017–18	Utah	1	0	1.0	**1.000**	**1.000**	—	—	—	—	—	**3.0**
2018–19	Utah	**14**	0	6.0	.300	.182	**1.000**	.4	1.1	.1	.1	1.1
2019–20	Indiana	5	0	**9.4**	.353	.167	—	**1.4**	**1.6**	**.2**	**.2**	2.8
Career		20	0	6.6	.342	.208	1.000	.6	1.1	.1	.1	1.6

=== EuroLeague ===
Year	Team	GP	GS	MPG	FG%	3P%	FT%	RPG	APG	SPG	BPG	PPG	PIR
2022–23	Olimpia Milano	**21**	**3**	**17.5**	.371	**.352**	.929	**2.0**	**2.0**	**.4**	.0	**7.4**	**4.7**
2023–24	Žalgiris	9	0	10.2	**.375**	.286	**1.000**	1.2	1.0	.2	—	4.1	1.8
2023–24	Olympiacos	9	0	8.1	.250	.143	.500	.2	1.1	.3	—	1.8	0.1
Career		39	3	13.7	.357	.317	.879	1.4	1.6	.3	.0	5.3	3.0

=== Domestic leagues ===
Year	Team	League	GP	MPG	FG%	3P%	FT%	RPG	APG	SPG	BPG	PPG
2017–18	(United States) Salt Lake City Stars	G League	40	35.1	.424	.377	.860	6.1	4.5	1.2	.1	17.9
2018–19	(United States) Salt Lake City Stars	G League	32	32.5	.441	.333	.831	4.7	4.8	.8	.6	18.8
2019–20	(United States) Fort Wayne Mad Ants	G League	14	27.3	.368	.333	.800	5.9	6.1	1.1	.1	13.7
2020–21	(United States) Fort Wayne Mad Ants	G League	13	25.9	.438	.333	.852	4.7	6.1	1.1	.1	13.7
2021–22	(Italy) Brescia	LBA	33	29.0	.437	.367	.861	4.3	5.0	.9	.0	17.6
2022–23	(Italy) Olimpia Milano	LBA	14	19.9	.376	.359	.850	2.4	2.7	.4	—	7.9
2023–24	(Lithuania) Žalgiris	LKL	10	19.1	.392	.250	.900	3.0	3.0	.6	.1	8.4
2023–24	(Greece) Olympiacos	HEBA A1	21	15.0	.400	.306	.774	1.9	2.6	.3	.1	5.3

=== College ===
Year	Team	GP	GS	MPG	FG%	3P%	FT%	RPG	APG	SPG	BPG	PPG
2012–13	Iowa State	18	0	6.9	.348	.278	**1.000**	.8	1.0	.3	—	1.4
2013–14	Iowa State	**36**	7	20.3	.432	**.400**	.643	1.6	1.1	.2	.1	7.1
2014–15	Iowa State	34	33	27.5	.449	.391	.755	2.9	2.0	.8	.1	10.1
2015–16	Iowa State	8	8	31.6	.425	.291	.600	2.9	1.9	.6	**.3**	12.0
2016–17	Iowa State	35	**35**	**33.3**	**.473**	.384	.795	**4.6**	**2.7**	**1.2**	—	**15.1**
Career		131	83	24.5	.451	.380	.751	2.7	1.8	.7	.1	9.5

== Personal life ==
Mitrou-Long was born on August 3, 1993, in Mississauga, Ontario, Canada, to Jersey Long and Georgia Mitrou. His father is of Trinidadian descent while his mother is a Greek Canadian. His mother Georgia was born in Sparta, Greece and immigrated to Canada along with her family when she was a child. His brother, Elijah Mitrou-Long, previously played college basketball for Mount St. Mary's University before transferring to the University of Texas in his junior year. After one year with the Longhorns, he transferred to the University of Nevada, Las Vegas. In summer 2015, Mitrou-Long decided to display his full last name on his jersey to honor his mother; up to that point his jersey had only his father's name on it.

Mitrou-Long was officially in the process of obtaining a Greek passport as of 2022. He officially gained a Greek passport on 22 December 2023.
