= Nikos Plotas =

Greek basketball player

- Plotas with Olympiacos in 2026

No. 9 – Olympiacos
- Position: Shooting guard
- League: Greek Basketball League; EuroLeague

Personal information
- Born: 12 June 2004 (age 22) Patras, Greece
- Listed height: 1.95 m (6 ft 5 in)

Career information
- Playing career: 2021–present

Career history
- 2021–2026: Promitheas Patras
- 2024: →Karditsa
- 2025: →Koroivos
- 2026–present: Olympiacos

Career highlights
- Greek Super Cup winner (2026); Greek League Best Young Player (2026)
Medals
Men's basketball
Representing Greece
FIBA Europe Under-20 Championship
Bronze medal – third place	2023 Greece
Bronze medal – third place	2024 Poland

Nikolaos "Nikos" Plotas (Greek: Νικόλαος "Νίκος" Πλώτας; born 12 June 2004) is a Greek professional basketball player for Olympiacos of the Greek Basketball League (GBL) and the EuroLeague.

== Professional career ==
Plotas grew up with the youth academies of Promitheas Patras. He made his professional debut with the senior team during the 2021–22 season.

In September 2024, Plotas was loaned to Karditsa for the 2024–25 season, but was recalled by Promitheas in November 2024. In January 2025, he was loaned to Koroivos for the remainder of the season.

During the 2025–26 season, Plotas had a breakout year with Promitheas Patras, averaging 5.5 points and 1.8 rebounds in 23 domestic league games, while also appearing in 7 Basketball Champions League games. At the end of the season, he was named the Greek Basket League Best Young Player.

On 20 August 2026, Plotas signed a five-year contract with EuroLeague powerhouse Olympiacos.

== National team career ==
Plotas has been a member of the junior national teams of Greece. With the Greek under-20 national team, he won back-to-back bronze medals at the FIBA Europe Under-20 Championship in 2023 and 2024.

== Awards and accomplishments ==
- Greek Basket League Best Young Player: (2026)
