= 2025–26 GBL season =

85th season of the Greek Basket League

Greek Basketball League
- Season: 2025–26
- Games played: 158
- Teams: 13

Regular season
- Top seed: Olympiacos
- Season MVP: (France) Evan Fournier
- Relegated: Panionios

Finals
- Champions: Olympiacos (16th title)
- Runners-up: Panathinaikos
- Finals MVP: (France) Evan Fournier

Statistical leaders
Points	(United States) Frank Bartley	396
Rebounds	(United States) Ben Moore	169
Assists	(United States) Tyree Appleby	137
Index Rating	(United States) Ben Moore	390
- All statistics correct as of 7 May 2026.

The 2025–26 GBL season was the 34th season of the top-tier Greek professional basketball league, since its establishment in 1992, and the 86th season of top-flight Greek basketball overall.

The season began on 4 October 2025, and concluded in June 2026 with the finals.

Olympiacos were the defending champions, and successfully defended their title, thus winning their 16th title in the competition by defeating Panathinaikos in a 3-2 series.

== Teams ==
=== Promotion and relegation (pre-season) ===
Relegated from the 2024–25 GBL

- Lavrio

Promoted from the 2024–25 A2 League

- Mykonos
- Iraklis

=== Locations and arenas ===
Location map for competing teams in GBL 2025–26.

Club	Location	Arena	Capacity
AEK	Athens (Ano Liosia)	Ano Liosia Olympic Hall	9,327
Aris	Thessaloniki	Alexandrio Melathron	5,138
Iraklis	Thessaloniki	Ivanofeio Sports Arena	2,580
Karditsa	Karditsa	Karditsa New Indoor Hall	3,000
Kolossos	Rhodes	Kallithea Palais des Sports	1,400
Maroussi	Athens (Marousi)	Maroussi Saint Thomas Indoor Hall	1,700
Mykonos	Mykonos	P. Chanioti Ano Mera Indoor Hall	1,000
Olympiacos	Piraeus	Peace and Friendship Stadium	11,319
Panathinaikos	Athens (Marousi)	Telekom Center Athens	19,443
Panionios	Athens (Glyfada)	National Athletic Center Glyfada Makis Liougas	3,500
PAOK	Thessaloniki (Pylaia)	PAOK Sports Arena	8,500
Peristeri	Athens (Peristeri)	Peristeri Arena	4,000
Promitheas	Patras	Dimitris Tofalos Arena	4,150

== Regular season ==
=== League table ===
Pos	Team	Pld	W	L	PF	PA	PD	Pts	Qualification or relegation
1	Olympiacos	24	24	0	2335	1905	+430	48	Advanced to playoffs
2	Panathinaikos	24	19	5	2186	1864	+322	43	Advanced to playoffs
3	PAOK	24	17	7	2018	1939	+79	41	Advanced to playoffs
4	AEK	24	16	8	2006	1905	+101	40	Advanced to playoffs
5	Aris Thessaloniki	24	14	10	2014	1945	+69	38	Advanced to playoffs
6	Peristeri	24	14	10	1894	1902	−8	38	Advanced to playoffs
7	Mykonos	24	9	15	1921	2097	−176	33	Advanced to playoffs
8	Kolossos Rodou	24	8	16	1978	2056	−78	32	Advanced to playoffs
9	Iraklis	24	8	16	1920	2030	−110	32	
10	Promitheas Patras	24	8	16	2016	2164	−148	32	
11	Karditsa	24	7	17	1897	2034	−137	31	
12	Marousi	24	6	18	2060	2211	−151	30	
13	Panionios	24	6	18	1861	2054	−193	30	Relegated to the Elite League

Updated to match(es) played on 7 May 2026. Source: ESAKE

=== Results ===
Home \ Away	AEK	ARI	IRA	KAR	KOL	MAR	MYK	OLY	PAN	PNN	PAOK	PER	PRO
AEK	—	82–76	100–87	77–62	96–83	83–74	90–65	84–94	63–101	93–73	76–78	64–74	102–85
Aris Thessaloniki	82–78	—	78–76	78–55	65–73	102–76	78–61	84–95	102–95	75–65	73–78	81–76	96–80
Iraklis	61–82	80–82	—	93–73	86–71	72–91	73–80	70–95	76–74	80–66	72–76	73–59	90–79
Karditsa	71–79	91–77	80–87	—	75–73	103–87	103–77	80–120	53–78	85–72	68–72	88–74	95–79
Kolossos	85–87	92–96	98–85	91–80	—	90–76	83–97	85–98	67–90	78–76	78–90	72–80	81–89
Maroussi	82–103	108–103	87–92	78–77	108–93	—	94–103	81–100	89–99	97–105	87–97	61–84	96–78
Mykonos	76–77	74–83	83–80	75–65	67–84	77–75	—	65–91	65–78	86–77	101–94	92–88	89–99
Olympiacos	100–93	92–81	103–87	102–82	100–86	104–89	109–83	—	90–86	81–66	100–73	94–71	102–87
Panathinaikos	103–78	82–77	97–82	92–85	97–102	92–81	97–76	94–101	—	110–66	93–83	94–86	91–70
Panionios	57–71	73–90	103–77	107–105	73–62	80–92	87–76	71–79	68–84	—	67–70	61–87	95–101
PAOK	71–88	88–77	84–82	93–90	82–70	101–85	100–87	81–92	69–74	106–88	—	87–73	100–70
Peristeri	79–66	78–75	92–74	82–69	87–83	80–78	89–83	62–105	72–89	82–74	75–70	—	80–92
Promitheas	86–94	97–103	97–85	91–62	76–98	93–88	103–83	64–88	63–96	87–91	73–75	77–84	—

Source: ESAKE
Legend: Blue = home team win; Red = away team win.
Matches with lighter background shading were decided after overtime.

== Playoffs ==
The eight highest ranked teams from the regular season qualify for the playoffs. Quarterfinals and Semifinals are being played in a "best of 3" format, while the Finals are being played in a "best of 5" format.

=== Bracket ===
Quarter-finals
Olympiacos	2
Kolossos Rodou	0
AEK	2
Aris	1
Panathinaikos	2
Mykonos	0
PAOK	2
Peristeri	0

Semi-finals
Olympiacos	2
AEK	0
Panathinaikos	2
PAOK	0

Final
Olympiacos	3
Panathinaikos	2

=== Quarterfinals (best of 3) ===
Team 1	Series	Team 2	Game 1	Game 2	Game 3
Olympiacos	2–0	Kolossos Rodou	117–76	97–58	
AEK	2–1	Aris	87–81	81–90	102–99
Panathinaikos	2–0	Mykonos	99–75	90–76	
PAOK	2–0	Peristeri	91–79	77–72	

=== Semifinals (best of 3) ===
Team 1	Series	Team 2	Game 1	Game 2	Game 3
Olympiacos	2–0	AEK	94–77	95–68	
Panathinaikos	2–0	PAOK	114–102	102–94	

== Finals (best of 5) ==
Team 1	Series	Team 2	Game 1	Game 2	Game 3	Game 4	Game 5
Olympiacos	3–2	Panathinaikos	82–76	58–68	102−92	86–93	89−85

=== Game 1 ===
3 June 2026	Olympiacos	82–76	Panathinaikos
20:00 (CET)	Scoring by quarter: 21–17, 21–13, 20–28, 20–18
	Pts: Fournier 20; Vezenkov 16; Rebs: Milutinov 12; Fournier 5 Asts: Walkup 6 Fournier 5	Boxscore	Pts: Osman 23; Rebs: Osman, Nunn, Mitoglou 4 Asts: Shorts 6	Arena: Peace and Friendship Stadium; Referees: Tsaroucha; Tsimpouris; Katrachouras

=== Game 2 ===
5 June 2026	Panathinaikos	68–58	Olympiacos
20:00 (CET)	Scoring by quarter: 9–15, 20–15, 19–8, 20–20
	Pts: Hayes-Davis 23; Rebs: Lessort 8 Asts: Nunn 5	Boxscore	Pts: Fournier 15; Rebs: Fournier 7 Asts: Fournier 7	Arena: Telekom Center Athens; Referees: Papapetrou; Tiganis; Theonas

=== Game 3 ===
8 June 2026	Olympiacos	102–92	Panathinaikos
20:00 (CET)	Scoring by quarter: 27–21, 20–24, 23–17, 32–30
	Pts: Fournier 28; Vezenkov 24; Milutinov 17; Rebs: Milutinov 6 Asts: Fournier 8	Boxscore	Pts: Grant 19; Rebs: Hayes-Davis 6 Asts: Grant 5	Arena: Peace and Friendship Stadium; Referees: Tiganis; Tsimpouris; Karpanos

=== Game 4 ===
10 June 2026	Panathinaikos	93–86(OT)	Olympiacos
20:00 (CET)	Scoring by quarter: 20–16, 20–18, 13–23, 16–12, Overtime: 24–17
	Pts: Nunn 23; Rebs: Hernangómez 10; Asts: Shorts, Grant 4	Boxscore	Pts: Fournier 29; Walkup 19; Vezenkov 14; Rebs: Fournier 8 Asts: Walkup, Vezenkov, Milutinov, Fournier 3	Arena: Telekom Center Athens; Referees: Papapetrou; Poursanidis; Katrachouras

=== Game 5 ===
13 June 2026	Olympiacos	89–85	Panathinaikos
17:00 (CET)	Scoring by quarter: 26–17, 21–18, 22–24, 20–26
	Pts: Fournier 22; Vezenkov 19; Milutinov 14; Rebs: Ward Milutinov 7 Asts: Fournier 7 Walkup 4	Boxscore	Pts: Toliopoulos 21; Rebs: Lessort 7 Asts: Shorts 6	Arena: Peace and Friendship Stadium; Referees: Tsaroucha; Tiganis; Karpanos

== Awards ==
All official awards of the 2025–26 GBL.

=== Greek League MVP ===
Player	Team
(France) Evan Fournier	Olympiacos

=== Greek League Finals MVP ===
Player	Team
(France) Evan Fournier	Olympiacos

=== All-Greek League Team ===
Pos.	Player	Team
G	(United States) Breein Tyree	PAOK
G	(Greece) Tyler Dorsey	Olympiacos
F	(France) Evan Fournier	Olympiacos
F	(Bulgaria) Sasha Vezenkov	Olympiacos
C	(Serbia) Nikola Milutinov	Olympiacos

=== Best Coach ===
Player	Team
(Greece) Giorgos Bartzokas	Olympiacos

=== Defensive Player of the Year ===
Player	Team
(Greece) Thomas Walkup	Olympiacos

=== Best Young Player ===
Player	Team
(Greece) Nikos Plotas	Promitheas Patras

=== Most Improved Player ===
Player	Team
(Greece) Tyler Dorsey	Olympiacos

=== Most Spectacular Player ===
Player	Team
(United States) Greg Brown III	AEK

== Statistical leaders ==
The GBL counts official stats leaders by stats totals, and not by per game averages. It also counts the total stats for both regular season combined.

=== Performance Index Rating ===
Pos	Player	Club	PIR
1	(United States) Ben Moore	PAOK	390
2	(United States) Frank Bartley	AEK	371
3	(United States) Donta Hall	Olympiacos	366
4	(Bulgaria) Sasha Vezenkov	Olympiacos	355
5	(United States) Bryce Jones	Aris	349

=== Points ===
Pos	Player	Club	Total Points
1	(United States) Frank Bartley	AEK	396
2	(United States) Brandon Jefferson	Karditsa	367
3	(United States) Bryce Jones	Aris	344
4	(United States) Ty Nichols	Peristeri	337
5	(United States) Tyree Appleby	Mykonos	334

=== Rebounds ===
Pos	Player	Club	Total Rebounds
1	(United States) Ben Moore	PAOK	169
2	(United States) Jake Van Tubbergen	Peristeri	156
3	(Brazil) Gabriel Galvanini	Kolossos Rodou	154
4	(United States) Kendal Coleman	Promitheas	147
5	(United Kingdom) Noah Horchler	Karditsa	145

=== Assists ===
Pos	Player	Club	Total Assists
1	(United States) Tyree Appleby	Mykonos	137
2	(Greece) Dimitris Moraitis	Iraklis	127
3	(Spain) Alvaro Cardenas	Peristeri	122
4	(Greece) Nikos Diplaros	Karditsa	116
5	(Greece) Thomas Walkup	Olympiacos	116

== Clubs in international competitions ==
Team	Competition	Result
Olympiacos	EuroLeague	Final Four, 1st place
Panathinaikos	EuroLeague	Playoffs
Aris	EuroCup	Regular season
Panionios	EuroCup	Regular season
AEK	Champions League	Final Four, 2nd place
Karditsa	Champions League	Round of 16
Promitheas	Champions League	Play-ins
PAOK	Champions League	Qualifying Rounds
PAOK	Europe Cup	Finals, 2nd place
Peristeri	Europe Cup	Quarter-finals
Iraklis	ENBL	Quarter-finals

== See also ==
- 2025 Greek Basketball Super Cup
- 2025–26 Greek Basketball Cup
