= 2022 Greek Basketball Super Cup =

2022 Greek Super Cup
- Season: 2022-23
- Duration: 1–2 October 2022
- Teams: 4

Finals
- Champions: Olympiacos (1st title)
- Runners-up: Panathinaikos OPAP
- Final Four MVP: (France) Moustapha Fall

Statistical leaders
Points	(Bulgaria) Sasha Vezenkov	31
Rebounds	(Bulgaria) Sasha Vezenkov	16
Assists	(Greece) Thomas Walkup	10

The 2022 Greek Basketball Super Cup is the 3rd edition of the revived Greek professional domestic basketball Supercup competition, under the auspices of the Hellenic Basketball Clubs Association (HEBA), and the 4th overall. The Greek Basketball Supercup had been played only three times before, in 1986 under the auspices of the Hellenic Basketball Federation (E.O.K.), in 2020, and in 2021. All games were hosted in Kallithea Palais des Sports in Rhodes, Greece.

Olympiacos won the 2022 Greek Super Cup.

== Format ==
The competition will be played in a final-four format and single elimination games, between the teams placed in the four first places of the 2021–22 Greek Basket League, which include the 2021–22 Greek Basketball Cup winner and finalist. Larisa basketball team finished fourth in the 2021–22 Greek Basket League earning the right to participate in the Super Cup final four competition, however, the club decided to forfeit the competition and Kolossos H Hotels replaced them.

=== Qualified teams ===
The following four teams qualified for the tournament.

Team	Method of qualification	Appearance	Last appearance
Olympiacos	2021–22 Greek League Champion, 2021–22 Greek Cup Winner	1st	None
Panathinaikos OPAP	2021–22 Greek League Runners-Up, 2021–22 Greek Cup Runners-Up, 2021 Greek Super Cup Winner	4th	1986, 2020, 2021
Promitheas Patras	2021–22 Greek League 3rd Place, 2021 Greek Super Cup Runners-Up	3rd	2020, 2021
Kolossos H Hotels	2021–22 Greek League 5th Place	1st	None

== Bracket ==
Semifinals; 1 October 2022
Olympiacos	93
Promitheas Patras	65
Panathinaikos OPAP	72
Kolossos H Hotels	67

Finals; 2 October 2022
Olympiacos	67
Panathinaikos OPAP	52
Third place
Kolossos H Hotels	71
Promitheas Patras	95

== Semifinals ==
1 October 2022	Panathinaikos	72–67	Kolossos	Rhodes
17:00	Scoring by quarter: 20–18, 16–14, 25–25, 11–10
	Pts: Williams 14; Rebs: Gudaitis 4 Asts: Lee 5	Boxscore		Arena: Kallithea Palais des Sports

1 October 2022	Olympiacos	93–65	Promitheas Patras	Rhodes
21:00	Scoring by quarter: 23–19, 24–15, 22–14, 24–17
	Pts: Vezenkov 19; Rebs: Fall 5 Asts: Sloukas 7	Boxscore		Arena: Kallithea Palais des Sports

== Final ==
2 October 2022	Olympiacos	67–52	Panathinaikos	Rhodes
21:00	Scoring by quarter: 18–15, 19–19, 19–9, 11–9
	Pts: Vezenkov 12, Fall 12; Rebs: Vezenkov 11; Asts: Fall 5, Sloukas 4	Boxscore	Pts: Lee 12; Rebs: Papagiannis 8 Asts: Lee 4	Arena: Kallithea Palais des Sports

== Awards ==
=== Finals Most Valuable Player ===
Player	Team
(France) Moustapha Fall	Olympiacos

=== Finals Top Scorer ===
Player	Team
(Bulgaria) Sasha Vezenkov	Olympiacos
