= 2021 Greek Basketball Super Cup =

2021 Greek Super Cup
- Season: 2021–22
- Duration: 25–26 September 2021
- Teams: 4

Finals
- Champions: Panathinaikos OPAP (1st title)
- Runners-up: Promitheas Patras

The 2021 Greek Basketball Super Cup is the 2nd edition of the revived Greek professional domestic basketball super cup competition, under the auspices of the Hellenic Basketball Clubs Association (HEBA), and the 3rd overall. The Greek Basketball Supercup had been played only twice before, in 1986 under the auspices of the Hellenic Basketball Federation (E.O.K.) and 2020. All games were hosted in Dimitris Tofalos Arena in Patras, Greece.

Panathinaikos OPAP won the 2021 Greek Super Cup.

== Format ==
The competition will be played in a final-four format and single elimination games, between the teams placed in the four first places of the 2020–21 Greek Basket League, which include the 2020–21 Greek Basketball Cup winner and finalist.

=== Qualified teams ===
The following four teams qualified for the tournament.

Team	Method of qualification	Appearance	Last appearance
Panathinaikos OPAP	2020–21 Greek League Champion, 2020–21 Greek Cup Winner	3rd	1986, 2020
Promitheas Patras	2020–21 Greek Cup Runners-Up, 2020 Greek Super Cup Winner	2nd	2020
Lavrio	2020–21 Greek League Runners-Up	1st	None
AEK	2020–21 Greek League 3rd Place	2nd	2020

== Bracket ==
Semifinals; 25 September 2021
Panathinaikos OPAP	74
Lavrio	61
Promitheas Patras	88
AEK	71

Finals; 26 September 2021
Panathinaikos OPAP	92
Promitheas Patras	83
Third place
Lavrio	67
AEK	86
