= Greek Basketball Super Cup =

Men's basketball Super Cup in Greece

- Current season, competition or edition: 2026 Greek Basketball Super Cup
- Sport: Basketball
- Founded: 1986 under Hellenic Basketball Federation (E.O.K.); Re-founded 2020 under Hellenic Basketball Association (HEBA)
- CEO: Andreas Miaoulis
- No. of teams: 2 (1986); 4 (since 2020)
- Country: Greece
- Continent: Europe
- Most recent champion: Olympiacos (5th title)
- Most titles: Olympiacos (5 titles)
- Broadcaster: ERT
- Related competitions: Greek Basketball League; Greek Basketball Cup
- Website: www.esake.gr

The Greek Basketball Super Cup or Hellenic Basketball Super Cup (also stylized as Basket Super Cup), is the top-tier level professional basketball national Supercup competition in Greece. The first edition of the tournament, was organized by the Hellenic Basketball Federation (E.O.K.), in 1986. It was contested by the Greek Basket League champions and the Greek Basketball Cup winners. However, the Greek Basketball Supercup was revived in 2020, by the Hellenic Basketball Association (HEBA), under a final four tournament format.

== History and competition format ==
The Greek Basketball Supercup was first held in 1986. It featured Aris, the champions of the Greek Basket League's 1985–86 season, and Panathinaikos, the winners of the 1985–86 Greek Basketball Cup. It was contested under a two-legged format, and the winner was decided by aggregate score. Aris won the first game at home, by a score of 117–85, and they also won the second game on the road, by a score of 104–88, and thus won the first Greek Supercup, by an aggregate score of 221–173. Aris then went on to win both the Greek Basket League championship and the Greek Basketball Cup title, or the Greek domestic double, for the next four consecutive seasons (1986–87, 1987–88, 1988–89, 1989–90). As a result, the tournament was not held again during that time, since its format didn't allow it to be held after the same team won both titles in the same season. Eventually, the original organizers of the competition, the Hellenic Basketball Federation (E.O.K.), decided that the Greek Super Cup was no longer needed, and they canceled it.

In September 2020, the Hellenic Basketball Association (HEBA), decided to hold its own new version of the Greek Basketball Supercup competition. Under the current competition format, the top two ranked teams from the previous Greek Basket League season, along with the two finalists of the previous Greek Cup tournament, compete against each other, in a final four, with single elimination games. If the same team or teams, finished in both the top two places of the previous season's Greek League and Greek Cup competitions, then the next highest-placed team or teams from the previous season's Greek League competition will take part in the Greek Super Cup.

Promitheas Patras won the 2020 Greek Supercup, on September 24, 2020, in the Athens final four. Panathinaikos OPAP won the 2021 Greek Super Cup, on September 26, 2021, in the Patras final four. Olympiacos won the 2022 Greek Supercup, on October 2, 2022, in the Rhodes final four. Olympiacos won the 2023 Greek Supercup, on September 30, 2023, in the Rhodes final four.

Olympiacos won the 2024 Greek Supercup, on September 29, 2023, in the Rhodes final four.

== Greek Super Cup winners ==
- 1986: Aris
- 2020: Promitheas Patras
- 2021: Panathinaikos
- 2022: Olympiacos
- 2023: Olympiacos
- 2024: Olympiacos
- 2025: Olympiacos
- 2026: Olympiacos

== Finals ==
Years	Winners	Score	Runners-up	Venue	Location	Finals MVP	Finals Top Scorer
1986	Aris	Game 1: 117–85; Game 2: 104–88 Aggregate: (221–173)	Panathinaikos	Alexandreio Melathron & Peace and Friendship Stadium	Thessaloniki & Piraeus	None	(Greece) Nikos Galis
2020	Promitheas Patras	82–74	Peristeri	Andreas Papandreou Indoor Hall	Athens	(United States) Danny Agbelese	(United States) Ian Miller
2021	Panathinaikos OPAP	92–83	Promitheas Patras	Dimitris Tofalos Arena	Patras	(Greece) Georgios Papagiannis	(Greece) Ioannis Papapetrou
2022	Olympiacos	67–52	Panathinaikos OPAP	Kallithea Palais des Sports	Rhodes	(France) Moustapha Fall	(Bulgaria) (Greece) Sasha Vezenkov
2023	Olympiacos	75–51	Panathinaikos Aktor	Kallithea Palais des Sports	Rhodes	(Greece) Giannoulis Larentzakis	(Greece) Giannoulis Larentzakis
2024	Olympiacos	86–85	Panathinaikos Aktor	Kallithea Palais des Sports	Rhodes	(Bulgaria) (Greece) Sasha Vezenkov	(Bulgaria) (Greece) Sasha Vezenkov
2025	Olympiacos	92–83	Promitheas Patras	Kallithea Palais des Sports	Rhodes	(Greece) Tyler Dorsey	(Greece) Tyler Dorsey
2026	Olympiacos	101–96	PAOK	Indoor Hall Andreas Papandreou	Peristeri	(Bulgaria) (Greece) Sasha Vezenkov	(Bulgaria) (Greece) Sasha Vezenkov

== Titles by club ==
Club	Winners	Runners-up	Years won	Years Lost
Olympiacos	5	—	2022, 2023, 2024, 2025, 2026	
Panathinaikos	1	4	2021	1986, 2022, 2023, 2024
Promitheas Patras	1	2	2020	2021, 2025
Aris	1	—	1986	
Peristeri	—	1		2020
PAOK	—	1		2026

== Titles by city ==
Four clubs have won the Greek Basketball Super Cup.

Urban Area	Clubs	Titles won	City	Club Home Arena
Piraeus	Olympiacos (5)	5	Piraeus	Peace and Friendship Stadium, Piraeus
Athens	Panathinaikos (1)	1	Athens	O.A.C.A. Olympic Indoor Hall, Marousi, Athens
Patras	Promitheas Patras (1)	1	Patras	Dimitris Tofalos Arena, Proastio, Patras
Thessaloniki	Aris (1)	1	Thessaloniki	Alexandreio Melathron Nick Galis Hall, Thessaloniki

== Final Fours ==
The 2020 Greek Super Cup competition introduced the Final Four system.

Year	1st	2nd	3rd	4th
2020	Promitheas Patras	Peristeri	Panathinaikos OPAP	AEK
2021	Panathinaikos OPAP	Promitheas Patras	AEK	Lavrio
2022	Olympiacos	Panathinaikos OPAP	Promitheas Patras	Kolossos H Hotels
2023	Olympiacos	Panathinaikos Aktor	Peristeri	PAOK
2024	Olympiacos	Panathinaikos Aktor	Peristeri	Aris
2025	Olympiacos	Promitheas Patras	AEK / Karditsa	
2026	Olympiacos	PAOK	AEK / Panathinaikos	

=== Final 4 performance by club ===
Club	1st	2nd	3rd	4th
Olympiacos	5 (2022, 2023, 2024, 2025, 2026)	—	—	—
Panathinaikos	1 (2021)	3 (2022, 2023, 2024)	2 (2020, 2026)	—
Promitheas Patras	1 (2020)	2 (2021, 2025)	1 (2022)	—
Peristeri	—	1 (2020)	2 (2023, 2024)	—
PAOK	—	1 (2026)	—	1 (2023)
AEK	—	—	3 (2021, 2025, 2026)	1 (2020)
ASK Karditsa	—	—	1 (2025)	—
Lavrio	—	—	—	1 (2021)
Kolossos H Hotels	—	—	—	1 (2022)
Aris	—	—	—	1 (2024)

== Greek Super Cup records ==
Source: ESAKE

=== Individual ===
==== Single game ====
- Most points scored

- 44 by (Greece) Nikos Galis (Aris), against Panathinaikos OPAP on August 27, 1986

- Most rebounds

- 13 by (Angola) Yanick Moreira (AEK Athens), against Panathinaikos OPAP on September 24, 2020

- Most assists

- 10 by (United States) Abdul Gaddy (Peristeri), against Panathinaikos OPAP on September 23, 2020

==== Overall ====
- Most points scored

- 85 by (Greece) Nikos Galis (Aris), against Panathinaikos OPAP in 1986

- Most rebounds

- 36 by (Greece) Georgios Papagiannis (Panathinaikos OPAP), in 2020, 2021, and 2022

=== Team ===
==== Single game ====
- Most points scored

- 117 by (Greece) Aris, against Panathinaikos OPAP on August 27, 1986

- Fewest points scored

- 51 by (Greece) Panathinaikos OPAP, against Olympiacos on September 30, 2023

==== Overall ====
- Most points scored

- 760 by (Greece) Panathinaikos OPAP, in 1986, 2020, 2021, 2022, 2023, and 2024

- Fewest points scored

- 113 by (Greece) PAOK, in 2023

== See also ==
- Greek Basketball League
- Greek Basketball Cup
- HEBA Greek All-Star Game
- Hellenic Basketball Federation
- Hellenic Basketball Association
