= 2020 Greek Basketball Super Cup =

2020 Greek Super Cup
- Season: 2020-21
- Duration: 23–24 September 2020
- Teams: 4

Finals
- Champions: Promitheas Patras (1st Title)
- Runners-up: Peristeri

The 2020 Greek Basketball Super Cup is the 1st edition of the revived Greek professional domestic basketball Super Cup competition, under the auspices of the Hellenic Basketball Clubs Association (HEBA), and the 2nd overall. The Greek Basketball Super Cup had been played only once before, in 1986, under the auspices of the Hellenic Basketball Federation (E.O.K.).

Promitheas Patras won the 2020 Greek Super Cup.

== Format ==
The competition will be played on a final-four format and single elimination games, between the teams placed in the four first places of the 2019–20 Greek Basket League, which include the 2019–20 Greek Basketball Cup winner and finalist.

=== Qualified teams ===
The following four teams qualified for the tournament.

Team	Method of qualification	Appearance	Last appearance
Panathinaikos	2019–20 Greek League Champion	2nd	1986
AEK	2019–20 Greek Cup Winners	1st	None
Promitheas Patras	2019–20 Greek Cup Runners-Up	1st	None
Peristeri	2019–20 Greek League 3rd Place	1st	None

== Bracket ==
Semifinals; 23 September 2020
Promitheas Patras	98
AEK	88
Panathinaikos OPAP	82
Peristeri	90

Finals; 24 September 2020
Promitheas Patras	82
Peristeri	74
Third place
AEK	73
Panathinaikos OPAP	79
