= Kallithea Palais des Sports =

Arena in Greece

Coordinates: 36°20′50″N 28°11′30″E

- Interactive map of Kallithea Palais des Sports
- Location: Faliraki, Rhodes, Greece
- Capacity: Basketball & Volleyball: 3,400
- Surface: Parquet

Construction
- Opened: 2014
- Renovated: 2019, 2024
- Expanded: 2018, 2024

Tenants
- AE Kallitheas Rodou; Kolossos (2019–present)

Kallithea Palais des Sports (Greek: Παλέ ντε Σπορ Καλλιθέας), is an indoor sporting arena that is located on the Greek island of Rhodes, in Faliraki, some 13 km away from Rhodes, Greece. The arena is mainly used to host basketball and volleyball games. The seating capacity of the arena is 3,400 people.

== History ==
Kallithea Palais des Sports hosted the Final Four of the 2018 Greek Volleyball Cup. The Greek basketball club, AE Kallitheas Rodou, has used the arena to host its home games. Kallithea Palais des Sports became the home arena of the Greek professional basketball team Kolossos, of the Greek Basket League, prior to the 2019–20 season.

When the arena opened in 2014, its original seating capacity was 820 people. In 2018, the arena's seating capacity was expanded to 1,400 people with permanent tier seating, and 2,000 with temporary tier seating. The arena's seating capacity was then further expanded to 3,400 people in 2024, so that Kolossos Rodou could play home games in the European secondary level competition, the FIBA Champions League.
