= Hellenic Basketball Clubs Association =

Basketball governing body in Greece

- Founded: 1992; 34 years ago
- Affiliation: FIBA Europe
- Headquarters: Marousi, Greece
- President: Michalis Melis

Official website
- www.esake.gr

The Hellenic Basketball Clubs Association (HEBA; Greek: Ελληνικός Σύνδεσμος Ανωνύμων Καλαθοσφαιρικών Εταιρειών, ΕΣΑΚΕ, lit. 'Hellenic Association of Public Limited Basketball Companies') is the governing body of the top-tier professional basketball league in Greece.

It was founded in 1992 as an association of basketball clubs employing paid players (Greek: Ένωση Σωματείων Αμειβομένων Καλαθοσφαιριστών, ΕΣΑΚ), following the legal establishment of professional basketball in the country.

Beginning with the 1992–93 season, the association assumed the administration and operation of the top-tier Greek basketball competition, then known as the A1 National Division (Greek: A1 Εθνική Κατηγορία). In 1996, it became the fourth member of ULEB (Union of European Leagues of Basketball — now European Basketball Leagues, or EBBL), joining the founding members: the leagues of France, Italy, and Spain. In 1997, the association adopted its current name, following the reconstitution of its members as public limited companies. In 2010, a new HEBA logo was unveiled, while in 2012, the A1 was renamed Basket League; subsequently, in 2024, it was renamed the Greek Basketball League (GBL).

Since 2020, HEBA has been responsible for organizing the Greek Super Cup, while in 2022 it introduced a "Hall of Fame" to honor the top players and coaches from the 30-year history of the professional league. During this period, HEBA also organized the Greek All-Star Game, which was ultimately discontinued in 2023.

== See also ==
- Greek Basketball League
- Greek Basketball Super Cup
- HEBA Greek All-Star Game
- Greek Basketball League Hall of Fame
