= 2023–24 AEK B.C. season =

AEK Athens BC 2023-24 basketball season

AEK
2023–24 season
- Chairman: Makis Angelopoulos
- Head coach: Joan Plaza (1–15); Ilias Zouros (16–)
- Arena: Ano Liosia Olympic Hall
- Greek League: TBD
- Greek Cup: Quarterfinals
- Champions League: Round of 16

The 2023–24 AEK B.C. season is AEK's 67th season in the top-tier level Greek Basket League. AEK will compete in three different competitions during the season.

== Transfers 2023–24 ==
=== Players In ===
No.	Pos.	Nat.	Name	Age	Moving from		Type	Ends	Transfer fee	Date	Source
	PG	(Greece)	Zois Karampelas	22	Apollon Patras	(Greece)	Loan return	June 30, 2025		May 2, 2023	
	SG	(Greece)	Omiros Netzipoglou	21	Aris Thessaloniki	(Greece)	Transfer	June 30, 2026	Free	June 1, 2023	
	C	(Greece)	Manos Chatzidakis	23	Kolossos Rodou	(Greece)	Transfer	June 30, 2026	Free	June 9, 2023	
	PF	(Greece)	Ioannis Kouzeloglou	28	San Pablo Burgos	(Spain)	Transfer	June 30, 2025	Free	July 4, 2023	
	SG	(United States)	Jordan McRae	32	Hapoel Tel Aviv	(Israel)	Transfer	June 30, 2024	Free	July 14, 2023	
	SF	(Lithuania)	Mindaugas Kuzminskas	33	Karşıyaka	(Turkey)	Transfer	June 30, 2024	Free	July 21, 2023	
	SG	(United States)	Ben McLemore	30	Shandong	(China)	Transfer	June 30, 2024	Free	August 6, 2023	
	PG	(United States)	Langston Hall	31	Bahçeşehir Koleji	(Turkey)	Transfer	June 30, 2024	Free	August 12, 2023	
	C	(Canada)	Mfiondu Kabengele	25	Maine Celtics	(United States)	Transfer	June 30, 2024	Free	August 13, 2023	
	C	(United States)	Justin Tillman	27	Hapoel Haifa	(Israel)	Transfer	June 30, 2024	Free	August 14, 2023	
	PG	(United States)	Chasson Randle	30	Leones de Ponce	(Puerto Rico)	Transfer	June 30, 2024	Free	August 16, 2023	
	C	(Greece)	Thomas Kottas	27	CSM Târgu Jiu	(Romania)	Transfer	June 30, 2024	Free	September 5, 2023	
	SF	(Greece)	Alfredos Pilavios	23	Lavrio	(Greece)	Transfer	June 30, 2024	Free	September 17, 2023	
	PF	(Greece)	Manolis Matalliotakis	29	Panerithraikos	(Greece)	Transfer	June 30, 2024	Free	October 2, 2023	
	C	(United States)	Jordan Morgan	32	Lokomotiv Kuban	(Russia)	Transfer	June 30, 2024	Free	December 27, 2023	
	SF	(United States)	Ricky Ledo	31	Anhui Wenyi	(China)	Transfer	June 30, 2024	Free	January 3, 2024	
	SG	(United States)	Brandon Knight	32	Piratas de Quebradillas	(Puerto Rico)	Transfer	June 30, 2024	Free	January 4, 2024	
	PF	(Greece)	Dimitris Agravanis	29	Río Breogán	(Spain)	Transfer	June 30, 2024	Free	January 13, 2024	

=== Players Out ===
No.	Pos.	Nat.	Name	Age	Moving to		Type	Transfer fee	Date	Source
	C	(Greece)	Dimitrios Mavroeidis	37	Retired				May 5, 2023	
	SG	(United States)	Kenny Williams	26	Peristeri	(Greece)			June 17, 2023	
	PG	(Greece)	Antonis Koniaris	25	Promitheas Patras	(Greece)			June 28, 2023	
	C	(Greece)	Costis Gontikas	29	Kolossos Rodou	(Greece)			July 1, 2023	
	SF	(Greece)	Andreas Petropoulos	29	Kolossos Rodou	(Greece)			July 12, 2023	
	SG	(Jamaica)	Brynton Lemar	28	Hapoel Jerusalem	(Israel)			July 20, 2023	
	PG	(Greece)	Vassilis Xanthopoulos	39	Peristeri	(Greece)			July 25, 2023	
	PG	(Greece)	Kostas Papadakis	24	Lavrio	(Greece)			August 12, 2023	
	C	(Finland)	Alexander Madsen	28	VEF Rīga	(Latvia)			September 4, 2023	
	PF	(United States)	Isaiah Miles	29	Maccabi Ironi Ramat Gan	(Israel)			September 15, 2023	
	PF	(Spain)	Pierre Oriola	30	Bàsquet Manresa	(Spain)			October 12, 2023	
	SG	(Latvia)	Jānis Strēlnieks	33	Givova Scafati	(Italy)			October 25, 2023	
	C	(Greece)	Thomas Kottas	27	Iraklis	(Greece)			December 11, 2023	
	SG	(United States)	Ben McLemore	30	Río Breogán	(Spain)			December 22, 2023	
	C	(Canada)	Mfiondu Kabengele	26	Reyer Venezia	(Italy)			December 26, 2023	

== Friendlies ==
Win Loss Draw

8 September 2023 Fasouras Cup	AEK (Greece)	82–76	(Romania) Cluj-Napoca	Ano Liosia
20:15 (EET)
				Arena: Ano Liosia Olympic Hall

9 September 2023 Fasouras Cup	Peristeri (Greece)	80–61	(Greece) AEK	Peristeri
17:15 (EET)
				Arena: Peristeri Indoor Hall

23 September 2023 Mauroskoufeia Cup	PAOK (Greece)	113–75	(Greece) AEK	Pylaia-Chortiatis
18:30 (EET)
				Arena: PAOK Sports Arena

24 September 2023 Mauroskoufeia Cup	AEK (Greece)	90–68	(Greece) Karditsa	Pylaia-Chortiatis
15:00 (EET)
				Arena: PAOK Sports Arena

1 October 2023 Friendly	Maroussi (Greece)	87–89	(Greece) AEK	Maroussi
19:30 (EET)
				Arena: Saint Thomas Indoor Hall

== Competitions ==
=== Overall ===
Competition	Started round	Current position / round	Final position / round	First match	Last match
Greek League	Matchday 1	—	—	7 October 2023	—
Greek Cup	Quarterfinals	—	—	15 February 2024	15 February 2024
Champions League	Group Stage	—	—	17 October 2023	20 March 2024

Updated to match played October 17, 2023
Source: GBL Games & Results, BCL Games & Results

=== Overview ===
Competition	Record							
Competition	Pld	W	D	L	PF	PA	PD	Win %
Greek League	14	6	0	8	1,208	1,168	+40	42.86
Greek Cup	1	0	0	1	72	79	−7	0.00
Champions League	12	5	0	7	1,018	995	+23	41.67
Total	27	11	0	16	2,298	2,242	+56	40.74

Last updated: April 11, 2024
Source: GBL Games & Results, BCL Games & Results

=== Greek League ===
==== Results summary ====
Overall						Home					Away				
Pld	W	L	PF	PA	PD	W	L	PF	PA	PD	W	L	PF	PA	PD
14	6	8	1208	1168	+40	5	2	650	581	+69	1	6	558	587	−29

Last updated: January 13, 2024.
Source: GBL Rankings

==== Results by round ====
Round	1	2	3	4	5	6	7	8	9	10	11	12	13	14	15	16	17	18	19	20	21	22
Ground	H	A	H	A	H	H	A	H	A	H	A	A	H	A	H	A	A	H	A	H	A	H
Result	L	L	W	L	W	W	L	W	L	W	L	W	L	L								
Position	8	9	7	8	9	7	8	6	7	6	7	5	6	6								

Updated to match(es) played on January 13, 2024. Source: GBL Fixtures
A = Away; H = Home; W = Win; D = Draw; L = Loss

==== Regular season ====
Win Loss

7 October 2023 1	AEK	93–98	Lavrio	Ano Liosia
17:15 (EET)
		Boxscore		Arena: Ano Liosia Olympic Hall; Attendance: 2000

15 October 2023 2	Olympiacos	79–71	AEK	Piraeus
17:15 (EET)
		Boxscore		Arena: Peace and Friendship Stadium

21 October 2023 3	AEK	100–70	Apollon Patras	Ano Liosia
20:15 (EET)
		Boxscore		Arena: Ano Liosia Olympic Hall; Attendance: 2000

29 October 2023 4	Aris	75–64	AEK	Thessaloniki
17:15 (EET)
		Boxscore		Arena: Alexandreio Melathron

4 November 2023 5	AEK	103–88	Karditsa	Ano Liosia
17:15 (EET)
		Boxscore		Arena: Ano Liosia Olympic Hall; Attendance: 1500

13 November 2023 6	AEK	93–74	Kolossos H Hotels	Ano Liosia
17:15 (EET)
		Boxscore		Arena: Ano Liosia Olympic Hall; Attendance: 800

20 November 2023 7	Panathinaikos AKTOR	86–85	AEK	Marousi
17:15 (EET)
		Boxscore		Arena: O.A.C.A. Olympic Indoor Hall

25 November 2023 8	AEK	90–70	PAOK mateco	Ano Liosia
20:15 (EET)
		Boxscore		Arena: Ano Liosia Olympic Hall; Attendance: 3000

2 December 2023 9	Promitheas	100–95	AEK	Patras
18:00 (EET)
		Boxscore		Arena: Dimitris Tofalos Arena

9 December 2023 10	AEK	91–89	Maroussi	Ano Liosia
20:15 (EET)
		Boxscore		Arena: Ano Liosia Olympic Hall; Attendance: 2000

24 December 2023 11	Peristeri bwin	89–78	AEK	Peristeri
17:15 (EET)
		Boxscore		Arena: Peristeri Indoor Hall

30 December 2023 12	Lavrio	75–90	AEK	Lavrio
20:15 (EET)
		Boxscore		Arena: Lavrio Indoor Hall

7 January 2024 13	AEK	80–92	Olympiacos	Ano Liosia
14:45 (EET)
		Boxscore		Arena: Ano Liosia Olympic Hall; Attendance: 6000

13 January 2024 14	Apollon Patras	83–75	AEK	Patras
19:30 (EET)
		Boxscore		Arena: Apollon Patras Indoor Hall

20 January 2024 15	AEK	91–93	Aris	Ano Liosia
17:15 (EET)
				Arena: Ano Liosia Olympic Hall; Attendance: 2500

27 January 2024 16	Karditsa	86–95	AEK	Karditsa
00:00 (EET)
				Arena: Karditsa New Indoor Arena

3 February 2024 17	Kolossos H Hotels	103–80	AEK	Rhodes
00:00 (EET)
				Arena: Kallithea Palais des Sports

10 February 2024 18	AEK	69–89	Panathinaikos AKTOR	Ano Liosia
20:15 (EET)
				Arena: Ano Liosia Olympic Hall; Attendance: 3000

2 March 2024 19	PAOK mateco	85–94	AEK	Thessaloniki
00:00 (EET)
				Arena: P.A.O.K. Sports Arena

9 March 2024 20	AEK	87–91	Promitheas	Ano Liosia
00:00 (EET)
				Arena: Ano Liosia Olympic Hall; Attendance: BEHIND CLOSED DOORS

16 March 2024 21	Maroussi	82–90	AEK	Marousi
00:00 (EET)
				Arena: Saint Thomas Indoor Hall

23 March 2024 22	AEK	87–101	Peristeri bwin	Ano Liosia
00:00 (EET)
				Arena: Ano Liosia Olympic Hall; Attendance: 1200

==== Results overview ====
Win Loss Draw

Opposition	Home score	Away score	Double
Aris Midea		75–64	
Apollon Patras	100–70	83–75	175–153
Karditsa	103–88		
Kolossos H Hotels	93–74		
Lavrio MEGABOLT	93–98	75–90	183–173
Maroussi	91–89		
Olympiacos	80–92	79–71	151–171
Panathinaikos AKTOR		86–85	
PAOK mateco	90–70		
Peristeri bwin		89–78	
Promitheas Patras		100–95	

=== Greek Cup ===
Win Loss

Quarterfinals

15 February 2024 Final-8	Panathinaikos AKTOR	79–72	AEK	Crete
18:00 (EET)
				Arena: Heraklion Indoor Sports Arena

=== FIBA Champions League ===
==== Regular season - Group D ====
Pos	Team	Pld	W	L	PF	PA	PD	Pts	Qualification	AEK	LUD	DIN	SZC
1	(Greece) AEK	6	5	1	528	461	+67	11	Advance to round of 16	—	84–79	110–79	86–64
2	(Germany) MHP Riesen Ludwigsburg	6	3	3	480	490	−10	9	Advance to play-ins	83–79	—	79–89	82–78
3	(Italy) Dinamo Sassari	6	2	4	509	543	−34	8	Advance to play-ins	79–83	80–97	—	97–81
4	(Poland) King Szczecin	6	2	4	473	496	−23	8		77–86	80–60	93–85	—

Source: Groups standings

==== Results summary ====
Overall						Home					Away				
Pld	W	L	PF	PA	PD	W	L	PF	PA	PD	W	L	PF	PA	PD
6	5	1	528	461	+67	3	0	280	222	+58	2	1	248	239	+9

Last updated: December 20, 2023.
Source: BCL Group D Results

==== Results by round ====
Round	1	2	3	4	5	6
Ground	H	A	A	H	H	A
Result	W	W	W	W	W	L
Position	2	1	1	1	1	1

Updated to match(es) played on December 20, 2023. Source: BCL Group D Fixtures
A = Away; H = Home; W = Win; D = Draw; L = Loss

==== Regular season ====
Win Loss

17 October 2023 1	AEK Athens (Greece)	84–79	(Germany) MHP Riesen Ludwigsburg	Ano Liosia
19:30 (EET)
		Boxscore		Arena: Ano Liosia Olympic Hall; Attendance: 1000

25 October 2023 2	Dinamo Banco di Sardegna Sassari (Italy)	79–83	(Greece) AEK Athens	Sassari
21:30 (EET)
		Boxscore		Arena: Palasport Roberta Serradimigni

8 November 2023 3	King Wilki Morskie Szczecin (Poland)	77–86	(Greece) AEK Athens	Szczecin
19:30 (EET)
		Boxscore		Arena: Netto Arena

22 November 2023 4	AEK Athens (Greece)	86–64	(Poland) King Wilki Morskie Szczecin	Ano Liosia
19:30 (EET)
		Boxscore		Arena: Ano Liosia Olympic Hall; Attendance: 1000

5 December 2023 5	AEK Athens (Greece)	110–79	(Italy) Dinamo Banco di Sardegna Sassari	Ano Liosia
19:30 (EET)
		Boxscore		Arena: Ano Liosia Olympic Hall; Attendance: 1000

20 December 2023 6	MHP Riesen Ludwigsburg (Germany)	83–79	(Greece) AEK Athens	Ludwigsburg
21:30 (EET)
		Boxscore		Arena: Arena Ludwigsburg

==== Results overview ====
Win Loss

Opposition	Home score	Away score	Double
(Italy) Dinamo Banco di Sardegna Sassari	110–79	79–83	193–158
(Germany) MHP Riesen Ludwigsburg	84–79	83–79	163–162
(Poland) King Wilki Morskie Szczecin	86–64	77–86	172–141

==== Round of 16 - Group L ====
Pos	Team	Pld	W	L	PF	PA	PD	Pts	Qualification	UCM	PRO	HOL	AEK
1	(Spain) UCAM Murcia	6	4	2	490	453	+37	10	Advance to quarter-finals	—	90–81	78–61	100–89
2	(Greece) Promitheas	6	4	2	485	472	+13	10	Advance to quarter-finals	79–78	—	92–93	80–79
3	(Israel) Hapoel Holon	6	4	2	474	480	−6	10		64–60	65–74	—	79–68
4	(Greece) AEK	6	0	6	490	534	−44	6		79–84	67–79	108–112	—

Source: Round of 16 Standings

==== Results summary ====
Overall						Home					Away				
Pld	W	L	PF	PA	PD	W	L	PF	PA	PD	W	L	PF	PA	PD
6	0	6	490	534	−44	0	3	254	275	−21	0	3	236	259	−23

Last updated: March 20, 2024.
Source: BCL Group L Results

==== Results by round ====
Round	1	2	3	4	5	6
Ground	A	A	H	H	A	H
Result	L	L	L	L	L	L
Position	4	4	4	4	4	4

Updated to match(es) played on March 20, 2024. Source: BCL Group L Fixtures
A = Away; H = Home; W = Win; D = Draw; L = Loss

==== Regular season ====
Win Loss

23 January 2024 1	Promitheas (Greece)	80–79	(Greece) AEK Athens	Patras
00:00 (EET)
		Boxscore		Arena: Dimitris Tofalos Arena

30 January 2024 2	Hapoel Holon (Israel)	79–68	(Greece) AEK Athens
00:00 (EET)
		Boxscore

6 February 2024 3	AEK Athens (Greece)	79–84	(Spain) UCAM Murcia	Ano Liosia
19:30 (EET)
		Boxscore		Arena: Ano Liosia Olympic Hall

5 March 2024 4	AEK Athens (Greece)	108–112	(Israel) Hapoel Holon	Ano Liosia
19:30 (EET)
		Boxscore		Arena: Ano Liosia Olympic Hall

12 March 2024 5	UCAM Murcia (Spain)	100–89	(Greece) AEK Athens	Murcia
21:30 (EET)
		Boxscore		Arena: Palacio de Deportes

20 March 2024 6	AEK Athens (Greece)	67–79	(Greece) Promitheas	Ano Liosia
19:30 (EET)
		Boxscore		Arena: Ano Liosia Olympic Hall

==== Results overview ====
Win Loss

Opposition	Home score	Away score	Double
(Spain) UCAM Murcia	79−84	100−89	168−184
(Greece) Promitheas Patras	67−79	80−79	146−159
(Israel) Hapoel Holon	108−112	79−68	176−191
