= 2024–25 GBL season =

85th season of the Greek Basket League

Greek Basketball League
- Season: 2024–25
- Dates: 5 October 2024 – 8 June 2025
- Games played: 169
- Teams: 12

Regular season
- Season MVP: (Bulgaria) Sasha Vezenkov
- Relegated: Lavrio

Finals
- Champions: Olympiacos (15th title)
- Runners-up: Panathinaikos
- Finals MVP: (Bulgaria) Sasha Vezenkov

Statistical leaders
Points	(Bulgaria) Sasha Vezenkov	382
Rebounds	(United States) Chris Coffey	166
Assists	(Greece) Nikos Diplaros	134
Index Rating	(Bulgaria) Sasha Vezenkov	494

The 2024–25 GBL season was the 33rd season of the top-tier Greek professional basketball league, since its establishment in 1992, and the 85th season of top-flight Greek basketball overall.

The season began on 5 October 2024, and concluded on 8 June 2025 with Olympiacos being crowned champions for the 15th time in their history, after defeating eternal rivals Panathinaikos 3–1 in the Finals series.

== Teams ==
=== Promotion and relegation (pre-season) ===
Relegated from the 2023–24 Basket League

- Apollon Patras

Promoted from the 2023–24 A2 League

- Panionios

* Milon B.C. declined promotion to the Greek Basketball League due to financial problems.

=== Locations and arenas ===
Location map for competing teams in GBL 2024–25.

Club	Location	Arena	Capacity
AEK	Athens (Ano Liosia)	Ano Liosia Olympic Hall	9,327
Aris	Thessaloniki	Alexandrio Melathron	5,138
Karditsa	Karditsa	Karditsa New Indoor Hall	3,000
Kolossos	Rhodes	Kallithea Palais des Sports	1,400
Lavrio	Lavrio	Lavrio Indoor Hall	1,700
Maroussi	Athens (Marousi)	Maroussi Saint Thomas Indoor Hall	1,700
Olympiacos	Piraeus	Peace and Friendship Stadium	11,319
Panathinaikos	Athens (Marousi)	OAKA Indoor Hall	19,443
Panionios	Athens (Glyfada)	National Athletic Center Glyfada Makis Liougas	3,500
PAOK	Thessaloniki (Pylaia)	PAOK Sports Arena	8,500
Peristeri	Athens (Peristeri)	Peristeri Arena	4,000
Promitheas	Patras	Dimitris Tofalos Arena	4,150

== Regular season ==
=== League table ===
Pos	Team	Pld	W	L	PF	PA	PD	Pts	Qualification or relegation
1	Panathinaikos AKTOR	22	22	0	2065	1675	+390	44	Advanced to playoffs
2	Olympiacos	22	20	2	1965	1617	+348	42	Advanced to playoffs
3	AEK	22	14	8	1871	1781	+90	36	Advanced to playoffs
4	Promitheas Patras	22	11	11	1790	1815	−25	33	Advanced to playoffs
5	Karditsa	22	11	11	1683	1725	−42	33	Advanced to playoffs
6	PAOK mateco	22	10	12	1738	1810	−72	32	Advanced to playoffs
7	Panionios	22	9	13	1696	1739	−43	31	Advanced to play-in
8	Aris Thessaloniki	22	9	13	1699	1839	−140	31	Advanced to play-in
9	Peristeri bwin	22	8	14	1677	1810	−133	30	Advanced to play-in
10	Lavrio Megabolt	22	7	15	1759	1873	−114	29	Advanced to play-in
11	Kolossos H Hotels	22	6	16	1720	1798	−78	28	Advanced to play-out
12	Maroussi	22	5	17	1705	1886	−181	27	Advanced to play-out

Updated to match(es) played on 27 May 2025. Source: ESAKE

=== Results ===
Home \ Away	AEK	ARI	KAR	KOL	LAV	MAR	OLY	PAN	PNN	PAOK	PER	PRO
AEK	—	102–89	96–65	86–75	97–86	104–83	77–96	80–103	75–71	91–68	96–67	91–71
Aris Thessaloniki	59–70	—	69–96	83–74	82–65	72–74	77–88	73–83	80–72	88–82	77–71	86–75
Karditsa	85–83	76–82	—	98–73	87–70	80–67	61–77	66–80	72–63	81–84	89–83	70–64
Kolossos	85–86	84–85	72–52	—	83–100	96–57	73–88	84–91	83–67	84–83	78–80	89–85
Lavrio	79–90	93–84	82–89	74–82	—	94–92	75–93	68–85	84–80	96–71	64–69	78–92
Maroussi	81–83	73–78	71–85	70–67	80–84	—	88–104	95–102	65–64	80–81	73–79	80–84
Olympiacos	89–70	102–72	93–72	95–76	87–77	106–94	—	71–78	95–64	86–60	84–78	106–66
Panathinaikos	94–74	126–74	96–72	94–82	98–70	100–74	78–72	—	97–66	100–81	104–68	92–67
Panionios	75–80	79–62	82–69	67–65	86–80	86–62	78–84	83–85	—	73–62	83–73	93–101
PAOK	87–82	75–63	71–61	94–70	69–74	93–84	60–90	93–96	98–105	—	84–74	86–73
Peristeri	89–82	73–68	71–78	85–81	84–82	81–86	69–82	84–99	82–72	72–80	—	75–82
Promitheas	84–76	106–96	96–79	78–64	93–84	63–76	74–77	78–84	85–87	87–76	86–70	—

Source: ESAKE
Legend: Blue = home team win; Red = away team win.
Matches with lighter background shading were decided after overtime.

== Play-in ==
Under the new format, the 7th to 10th-ranked teams faced each other in the play-in. Each game is hosted by the team with the higher regular season record. The format was similar to the first two rounds of the Page–McIntyre system for a four-team playoff that was identical to that of the NBA play-in tournament. First, the 7th seed will host the 8th seed, with the winner advancing to the playoffs as the 7th seed; likewise the 9th seed will host the 10th seed, with the loser eliminated. Then the loser of the 7-v-8 game will host the winner of the 9-v-10 game, with the winner of that game getting the final playoff spot, as the 8th seed.

Round 1
Play-In A
7	Panionios	92
8	Aris	78
Play-In B
9	Peristeri	90
10	Lavrio	77

Round 2
Play-In C
8	Aris	78
9	Peristeri	83

== Play-out ==
The 11th and 12th-ranked teams in the regular season, together with the two teams that got eliminated from the play-in tournament will participate in the play-out. They play against each other twice (6 matches per team). The team that finishes last gets relegated to the Elite League.

Pos	Team	Pld	W	L	PF	PA	PD	Pts	Qualification or relegation
9	A.S. Aris	28	13	15	2232	2359	−127	41	
10	Kolossos Rodou	28	10	18	2280	2289	−9	38	
11	Maroussi	28	9	19	2239	2407	−168	37	
12	Lavrio	28	7	21	2215	2429	−214	35	Relegated to the Elite League

Updated to match(es) played on 27 May 2025. Source: ESAKE

=== Results ===
Home \ Away	ARI	KOL	MAR	LAV
Aris	—	84–86	114–109	79–61
Kolossos Rodou	98–99	—	99–74	120–80
A.S. Maroussi	91–68	80–74	—	90–85
Lavrio	75–89	74–83	81–95	—

Legend: Blue = home team win; Red = away team win.
Matches with lighter background shading were decided after overtime.

== Playoffs ==
The six highest ranked teams from the regular season and the two teams that went through from the play-in tournament, qualify for the playoffs. Quarterfinals and Semifinals are being played in a "best of 3" format, while the Finals are being played in a "best of 5" format.

=== Bracket ===
Quarter-finals
Panathinaikos	2
Peristeri	0
Promitheas	2
Karditsa	1
Olympiacos	2
Panionios	0
AEK	2
PAOK	1

Semi-finals
Panathinaikos	2
Promitheas	0
Olympiacos	2
AEK	0

Final
Panathinaikos	1
Olympiacos	3
Third place
AEK	91
Promitheas	67

=== Quarterfinals (best of 3) ===
Team 1	Series	Team 2	Game 1	Game 2	Game 3
Panathinaikos	2–0	Peristeri	88–68	97–82	
Promitheas	2–1	Karditsa	80–76	74–75	85–65
Olympiacos	2–0	Panionios	106–67	91–85	
AEK	2–1	PAOK	89–76	69–94	89–85

=== Semifinals (best of 3) ===
Team 1	Series	Team 2	Game 1	Game 2	Game 3
Panathinaikos	2–0	Promitheas	101–69	97–59	
Olympiacos	2–0	AEK	87–85	90–64	

== Finals ==
Team 1	Series	Team 2	Game 1	Game 2	Game 3	Game 4	Game 5
Panathinaikos	1–3	Olympiacos	80–68	83–91	88–99	71–85	

=== Game 1 ===
30 May 2025	Panathinaikos	80–68	Olympiacos
21:00	Scoring by quarter: 20–19, 22–15, 16–16, 22–18
	Pts: Grant 17; Nunn 14; Rebs: Hernangomez 9 Yurtseven 7 Asts: Nunn 6 Sloukas 5	Boxscore	Pts: Vezenkov 20; Fall 15; Fournier 12; Rebs: Vezenkov 10; Fall 7 Asts: Fournier 5 Walhup 3	Arena: O.A.C.A. Olympic Indoor Hall; Referees: Tsaroucha; Tiganis; Katrachouras

=== Game 2 ===
1 June 2025	Olympiacos	91–83	Panathinaikos
21:00	Scoring by quarter: 23–18, 18–13, 25–24, 25–28
	Pts: Dorsey 16; Walkup 16; Vezenkov 15; Rebs: Vezenkov 9 Fall 5 Asts: Papanikolaou 5 Williams-Goss 3	Boxscore	Pts: Papapetrou 16; Sloukas 16; Nunn 10; Rebs: Yurtseven 6 Asts: Sloukas 8, Grant 7	Arena: Peace and Friendship Stadium; Referees: Tsibouris; Magklogiannis; Christinakis

=== Game 3 ===
6 June 2025	Panathinaikos	88–99	Olympiacos
21:00	Scoring by quarter: 28–30, 17–14, 22–34, 21–21
	Pts: Nunn 25; Osman 25; Rebs: Gabriel 7 Yurtseven 4 Asts: Grant 8 Sloukas 4	Boxscore	Pts: Vezenkov 25; Milutinov 17; Fournier 15; Rebs: Milutinov 6 Papanikolaou 6 Asts: Walkup 6 Vezenkov 4	Arena: O.A.C.A. Olympic Indoor Hall; Referees: Papapetrou; Poursanidis; Theonas

=== Game 4 ===
8 June 2025	Olympiacos	85–71	Panathinaikos
21:00	Scoring by quarter: 19–15, 23–23, 22–14, 21–19
	Pts: McKissic 20; Dorsey 17; Fournier 13; Rebs: Milutinov 10; Fournier 6 Asts: Fournier 4 Dorsey 3	Boxscore	Pts: Nunn 18; Sloukas 11; Rebs: Hernangomez 9 Yurtseven 6 Asts: Sloukas 7 Nunn 3	Arena: Peace and Friendship Stadium; Referees: Papapetrou; Tsibouris; Tiganis

== 5th-8th Placement Tournament ==
The 4 teams that lost in the quarterfinals participate in a tournament, identical to the play-in, to determine their final placement in the standings.

Round 1
Karditsa	90
PAOK	76
Panionios	102
Peristeri	93

Round 2
PAOK	94
Panionios	78

Pos.	Team
5th	Karditsa
6th	PAOK
7th	Panionios
8th	Peristeri

== Final standings ==
Pos	Team	Pld	W	L	Qualification or Relegation
1	Olympiacos	30	27	3	Qualification to the EuroLeague
2	Panathinaikos	30	27	3	Qualification to the EuroLeague
3	AEK	28	17	9	Qualification to the Basketball Champions League
4	Promitheas	28	13	15	Qualification to the Basketball Champions League
5	Karditsa	26	13	13	Qualification to the Basketball Champions League
6	PAOK	27	12	15	Qualification to the Basketball Champions League Qualifying Rounds
7	Panionios	27	11	16	Qualification to the EuroCup
8	Peristeri	27	11	16	Qualification to the FIBA Europe Cup
9	Aris	30	13	17	Qualification to the EuroCup
10	Kolossos Rodou	28	10	18	
11	Maroussi	28	9	19	
12	Lavrio	29	7	22	Relegation to the Elite League

== Awards ==
All official awards of the 2024–25 GBL.

=== Greek League MVP ===
Player	Team
(Bulgaria) Sasha Vezenkov	Olympiacos

=== Greek League Finals MVP ===
Player	Team
(Bulgaria) Sasha Vezenkov	Olympiacos

=== All-Greek League Team ===
Pos.	Player	Team
G	(United States) Kendrick Nunn	Panathinaikos
G	(France) Evan Fournier	Olympiacos
F	(Spain) Juancho Hernangómez	Panathinaikos
F	(Bulgaria) Sasha Vezenkov	Olympiacos
C	(Serbia) Nikola Milutinov	Olympiacos

=== Best Coach ===
Player	Team
(Italy) Massimo Cancellieri	PAOK

=== Defensive Player of the Year ===
Player	Team
(United States) Jerian Grant	Panathinaikos

=== Best Young Player ===
Player	Team
(Greece) Neoklis Avdalas	Peristeri

=== Most Improved Player ===
Player	Team
(Greece) Neoklis Avdalas	Peristeri

=== Most Spectacular Player ===
Player	Team
(United States) Kendrick Nunn	Panathinaikos

== Statistical leaders ==
The Greek Basket League counts official stats leaders by stats totals, and not by per game averages. It also counts the total stats for both regular season combined.

=== Performance Index Rating ===
Pos	Player	Club	PIR
1	(Bulgaria) Sasha Vezenkov	Olympiacos	494
2	(Cameroon) Landry Nnoko	Panionios	371
3	(Lithuania) Mindaugas Kuzminskas	AEK	354
4	(United States) Kendrick Nunn	Panathinaikos	337
5	(United States) Frank Bartley	PAOK	336

=== Points ===
Pos	Player	Club	Total Points
1	(Bulgaria) Sasha Vezenkov	Olympiacos	382
2	(United States) Andrew Goudelock	Kolossos	353
3	(United States) Frank Bartley	PAOK	320
4	(United States) Hunter Hale	AEK	314
5	(United States) Shavar Reynolds Jr.	PAOK	303

=== Rebounds ===
Pos	Player	Club	Total Rebounds
1	(United States) Chris Coffey	Peristeri	166
2	(Cameroon) Landry Nnoko	Panionios	152
3	(Guyana) Cyril Langevine	Maroussi	151
4	(Nigeria) Qudus Wahab	Lavrio	151
5	(United States) Francis Okoro	Karditsa	142

=== Assists ===
Pos	Player	Club	Total Assists
1	(Greece) Nikos Diplaros	Karditsa	134
2	(Iceland) Elvar Fridriksson	Maroussi	124
3	(Greece) Vassilis Mouratos	Lavrio	118
4	(United States) Prentiss Hubb	AEK	109
5	(United States) London Perrantes	Kolossos	97

== Clubs in international competitions ==
Team	Competition	Result
Olympiacos	EuroLeague	Final Four, 3rd place
Panathinaikos	EuroLeague	Final Four, 4th place
Aris	EuroCup	Regular season, 10th
AEK	Champions League	Final Four, 3rd place
Promitheas	Champions League	Round of 16
Peristeri	Champions League	Play-ins
Kolossos Rodou	Champions League	Regular season
PAOK	Champions League	Qualifying Rounds
PAOK	Europe Cup	Playoffs, 2nd place
Maroussi	Europe Cup	Second Round

== See also ==
- 2024 Greek Basketball Super Cup
- 2024–25 Greek Basketball Cup
