= 2026–27 GBL season =

87th season of top-flight Greek basketball

Greek Basketball League
- Season: 2026–27
- Games played: 56
- Teams: 14

Records
- Biggest home win: Kolossos 100–64 Promitheas
- Biggest away win: Promitheas 45–85 Olympiacos
- Highest scoring: Vikos 93–104 Maroussi
- Winning streak: 8 games (PAOK)
- Losing streak: 5 games (Mykonos & Promitheas)
- All statistics correct as of 22 November 2026.

The 2026–27 GBL season is the 35th season of the top-tier Greek professional men's basketball league since its establishment in 1992, and the 87th season of top-flight Greek men's basketball overall.

The regular season began on 3 October 2026, and will conclude on 18 April 2027.

Olympiacos Piraeus are the defending champions.

== Teams ==
=== Promotion and relegation ===
Relegated from the 2025–26 GBL:

- Panionios Athens

Promoted from the 2025–26 Elite League:

- Doxa Lefkada
- Vikos Ioannina

=== Locations and arenas ===
Locations of the 2026–27 GBL teams

Team	Location	Arena	Cap.
AEK	Athens	SUNEL Arena	9,025
Aris	Thessaloniki	Alexandreio Melathron	6,360
Doxa	Lefkada	Lefkada Indoor Hall	1,200
Iraklis	Thessaloniki	Ivanofeio Indoor Hall	2,635
Karditsa	Karditsa	Giannis Bourousis Indoor Hall	3,200
Kolossos	Rhodes	Kallithea Indoor Hall	3,200
Maroussi	Athens	Agios Thomas Indoor Hall	1,350
Mykonos	Mykonos	Panagiotis Chaniotis Indoor Hall	1,000
Olympiacos	Athens	SUNEL Arena	9,025
Panathinaikos	Athens	Telekom Center Athens	19,250
PAOK	Thessaloniki	PAOK Sports Arena	8,142
Peristeri	Athens	Andreas Papandreou Indoor Hall	4,000
Promitheas	Patras	Dimitris Tofalos Indoor Hall	5,150
Vikos	Ioannina	Sideris Karadimas Indoor Hall	1,000

== Regular season ==
=== League table ===
Pos	Team	Pld	W	L	PF	PA	PD	Pts	Qualification or relegation
1	PAOK	8	8	0	656	570	+86	16	Qualification to playoffs
2	Aris	8	6	2	684	606	+78	14	Qualification to playoffs
3	Olympiacos (Note: Olympiacos and Panathinaikos were each deducted 2 points.)	8	7	1	674	582	+92	13	Qualification to playoffs
4	Panathinaikos	8	7	1	697	592	+105	13	Qualification to playoffs
5	Peristeri	8	5	3	654	675	−21	13	Qualification to playoffs
6	Karditsa	8	4	4	591	584	+7	12	Qualification to playoffs
7	Kolossos	8	4	4	657	633	+24	12	Qualification to playoffs
8	Doxa	8	3	5	631	650	−19	11	Qualification to playoffs
9	AEK	8	3	5	613	641	−28	11	
10	Iraklis	8	3	5	645	622	+23	11	
11	Mykonos	8	2	6	604	674	−70	10	
12	Maroussi	8	2	6	631	667	−36	10	
13	Vikos	8	1	7	624	724	−100	9	Relegation to Elite League
14	Promitheas	8	1	7	577	718	−141	9	Relegation to Elite League

Updated to match(es) played on 22 November 2026. Source: ESAKE

=== Results ===
Home \ Away	AEK	ARIS	DOXA	IRA	KAR	KOL	MAR	MYK	OLY	PAN	PAOK	PER	PRO	VIK
AEK	—		73–77				91–70	84–79		74–83				
Aris	88–58	—					74–57		100–78	101–91				
Doxa		77–88	—	94–86								83–87	79–80	
Iraklis	84–87			—	71–53			95–64	68–78		53–63			
Karditsa		74–68			—	81–65			75–81		69–74			85–74
Kolossos			91–75			—					84–88	81–78	100–64	80–70
Maroussi							—	79–82	81–83				87–76	
Mykonos		72–88	59–73					—			85–88			96–83
Olympiacos						99–83			—			91–62		
Panathinaikos					78–64	78–73	85–72			—		95–75		103–74
PAOK	65–62	99–77	86–73								—			93–67
Peristeri				91–89			83–81	84–67				—		
Promitheas				92–99	73–90				45–85	59–84		88–94	—	
Vikos	95–84						93–104		68–79					—

Updated to match(es) played on 22 November 2026. Source: ESAKE
Legend: Blue = home team win; Red = away team win.
Matches with lighter background shading were decided after overtime.

== Statistical leaders ==
=== Players ===
Category	Player	Team	Per game
Points scored	(United States) De'Vion Harmon	Doxa	21.0
Two-pointers made	(United States) De'Vion Harmon	Doxa	6.9
Two-pointers attempted	(United States) De'Vion Harmon	Doxa	13.1
Three-pointers made	(Turkey) Cedi Osman	PAOK	3.3
Three-pointers attempted	(United States) Jordan Walker	Maroussi	7.3
Free throws made	(United States) Jordan Walker	Maroussi	6.8
Free throws attempted	(Nigeria) Nelly Joseph	AEK	8.4
Rebounds	(Nigeria) Nelly Joseph	AEK	7.9
Defensive rebounds	(Germany) Isaac Bonga	Panathinaikos	6.3
Offensive rebounds	(Canada) Kyle Alexander	PAOK	3.9
Assists	(Greece) Nikos Diplaros	Promitheas	7.5
Blocks	(United States) Ja'Vier Francis	Karditsa	1.8
Blocks against	(United States) K. J. Jackson	Karditsa	1.3
Fouls drawn	(United States) Jordan Walker	Maroussi	7.0
Fouls committed	(United Kingdom) Josh Sharma	Doxa	3.6
Steals	(United States) Ty Nichols	Peristeri	2.3
Turnovers	(Guinea) Shannon Evans	Promitheas	5.0
Minutes	(United States) De'Vion Harmon	Doxa	35.8
Ranking	(United States) De'Vion Harmon	Doxa	20.5

Players must have appeared in at least 50% of their team's games to qualify.
Flags indicate national team eligibility at FIBA-sanctioned events.
All stats accurate as of 22 November 2026. Source: ESAKE

=== Teams ===
Category	Team	Per game
Points scored	Panathinaikos	87.1
Two-pointers made	Iraklis	20.9
Two-pointers attempted	Karditsa	42.1
Three-pointers made	Kolossos & Panathinaikos	10.9
Three-pointers attempted	Peristeri	33.1
Free throws made	PAOK	18.9
Free throws attempted	PAOK	26.1
Rebounds	Iraklis	36.3
Defensive rebounds	Doxa & Panathinaikos	25.6
Offensive rebounds	Maroussi	11.0
Assists	Panathinaikos	20.8
Blocks	Iraklis & Olympiacos	3.5
Blocks against	Karditsa	4.0
Fouls drawn	PAOK	24.1
Fouls committed	Aris	25.8
Steals	Peristeri	9.5
Turnovers	Promitheas	16.3
Ranking	Panathinaikos	102.75

All stats accurate as of 22 November 2026. Source: ESAKE

== Awards ==
=== MVP of the Week ===
Round	Player	Team	Ranking	Ref.
1	(United States) Ja'Vier Francis	Karditsa	29	
2	(Dominican Republic) Jean Montero	Olympiacos	30	
3	(Turkey) Cedi Osman	PAOK	36	
4	(United States) E. J. Liddell	Aris	28	
5	(United States) De'Vion Harmon	Doxa	23	
6	(Senegal) Brancou Badio	Panathinaikos	31	
7	(United States) Jordan Walker	Maroussi	33	

Flags indicate national team eligibility at FIBA-sanctioned events.

== GBL teams in European competitions ==
Team	Competition	Progress
Olympiacos	EuroLeague	Regular season
Panathinaikos	EuroLeague	Regular season
Aris	EuroCup	Regular season
PAOK	EuroCup	Regular season
AEK	Champions League	Regular season
Peristeri	Champions League	Regular season
Promitheas	Champions League	Eliminated in the qualifying rounds (semi-finals)
Kolossos	Champions League	Eliminated in the qualifying rounds (round of 16)
Iraklis	Europe Cup	Regular season
Kolossos	Europe Cup	Regular season
Mykonos	Europe Cup	Regular season
Promitheas	Europe Cup	Regular season

== See also ==
- 2026–27 Greek Basketball Cup
- 2026 Greek Basketball Super Cup
