= 2023–24 Greek Basket League =

84th season of the Greek Basket League

Basket League
- Season: 2023–24
- Dates: 7 October 2023 - 14 June 2024
- Games played: 181
- Teams: 12

Regular season
- Season MVP: (Greece) Kostas Sloukas
- Relegated: Apollon Patras

Finals
- Champions: Panathinaikos (40th title)
- Runners-up: Olympiacos
- Finals MVP: (United States) Kendrick Nunn

Statistical leaders
Points	(United States) Hunter Hale	378
Rebounds	(United States) Chad Brown	166
Assists	(United States) Joe Ragland	184
Index Rating	(United States) Alec Peters	416

The 2023–24 Basket League season was the 32nd season of the top-tier Greek professional basketball league, since its establishment in 1992, and the 84th season of top-flight Greek basketball overall.

The season began on 7 October 2023, and concluded on 14 June 2024 with Panathinaikos being crowned champions for the 41st time in their history, after defeating eternal rivals Olympiacos 3–2 in the Finals series.

== Teams ==
=== Promotion and relegation (pre-season) ===
Relegated from the 2022–23 Basket League

- Ionikos Nikaias

Promoted from the 2022–23 A2 League

- Maroussi

=== Locations and arenas ===
Locations of the 2023–24 Basket League teams

Club	Location	Arena	Capacity
AEK	Athens (Ano Liosia)	Ano Liosia Olympic Hall	9,327
Apollon	Patras	Apollon Patras Indoor Hall	3,500
Aris	Thessaloniki	Alexandrio Melathron	5,138
Karditsa	Karditsa	Karditsa New Indoor Hall	3,000
Kolossos	Rhodes	Kallithea Palais des Sports	1,400
Lavrio	Lavrio	Lavrio Indoor Hall	1,700
Maroussi	Athens (Marousi)	Maroussi Saint Thomas Indoor Hall	1,700
Olympiacos	Piraeus	Peace and Friendship Stadium	11,319
Panathinaikos	Athens (Marousi)	OAKA Indoor Hall	19,443
PAOK	Thessaloniki (Pylaia)	PAOK Sports Arena	8,500
Peristeri	Athens (Peristeri)	Peristeri Arena	4,000
Promitheas	Patras	Dimitris Tofalos Arena	4,150

== Regular season ==
=== League table ===
Pos	Team	Pld	W	L	PF	PA	PD	Pts	Qualification or relegation
1	Panathinaikos	22	21	1	1892	1523	+369	43	Advanced to play-in
2	Olympiacos	22	20	2	1872	1496	+376	42	Advanced to play-in
3	Peristeri bwin	22	15	7	1810	1626	+184	37	Advanced to play-in
4	Promitheas Patras	22	13	9	1839	1774	+65	35	Advanced to play-in
5	Aris Thessaloniki	22	12	10	1680	1666	+14	34	Advanced to play-in
6	Kolossos H Hotels	22	9	13	1802	1861	−59	31	Advanced to play-in
7	AEK	22	9	13	1910	1898	+12	31	Advanced to play-out
8	Lavrio Megabolt	22	8	14	1657	1852	−195	30	Advanced to play-out
9	PAOK mateco	22	8	14	1617	1764	−147	30	Advanced to play-out
10	Maroussi	22	7	15	1802	1921	−119	29	Advanced to play-out
11	Karditsa	22	7	15	1650	1761	−111	29	Advanced to play-out
12	Apollon Patras	22	3	19	1460	1849	−389	25	Advanced to play-out

Updated to match(es) played on 25 May 2024. Source:

=== Results ===
Home \ Away	AEK	APO	ARI	MAR	KAR	KOL	LAV	OLY	PAN	PAOK	PER	PRO
AEK	—	100–70	91–93	91–89	103–88	93–74	84–60	80–92	69–89	90–70	97–101	87–91
Apollon	83–74	—	70–77	69–75	72–71	69–87	71–60	63–93	55–87	54–67	63–74	56–84
Aris Thessaloniki	75–64	76–63	—	67–73	69–61	98–91	84–60	72–81	65–75	77–63	81–73	73–77
Maroussi	82–90	99–73	84–89	—	94–88	85–74	71–75	83–111	79–92	75–80	74–103	70–95
Karditsa	86–95	76–74	80–71	87–84	—	87–69	84–68	54–83	64–87	97–78	84–95	101–72
Kolossos	103–80	88–60	78–88	89–85	73–67	—	88–73	59–102	78–81	95–79	104–93	114–109
Lavrio	75–90	82–75	91–86	88–93	76–57	79–76	—	54–96	76–92	86–76	64–86	89–84
Olympiacos	79–71	84–65	85–71	93–87	85–73	71–52	84–63	—	54–66	77–62	87–74	92–75
Panathinaikos	86–85	112–60	70–73	82–71	77–53	96–73	111–75	85–80	—	97–85	90–75	93–62
PAOK	85–94	87–70	82–76	79–85	72–69	93–81	66–65	63–77	73–89	—	69–64	80–95
Peristeri	89–78	90–57	84–62	95–72	77–48	89–77	89–87	67–85	64–66	71–35	—	76–71
Promitheas	100–95	106–68	70–57	111–92	87–75	84–79	100–73	57–81	54–69	80–73	75–81	—

Legend: Blue = home team win; Red = away team win.
Matches with lighter background shading were decided after overtime.

== Play-in ==
The six highest ranked teams in the regular season qualify for the Play-in. Those teams have already qualified for the GBL playoffs and will face each other once (5 matches per team), only for playoff placement purposes.

Pos	Team	Pld	W	L	PF	PA	PD	Pts	Qualification or relegation
1	Panathinaikos	27	26	1	2299	1906	+393	53	Advanced to playoffs
2	Olympiacos	27	24	3	2299	1868	+431	51	Advanced to playoffs
3	Peristeri bwin	27	16	11	2246	2076	+170	43	Advanced to playoffs
4	Promitheas Patras	27	16	11	2264	2012	+252	43	Advanced to playoffs
5	Aris Thessaloniki	27	13	14	2018	2167	−149	40	Advanced to playoffs
6	Kolossos H Hotels	27	10	17	2174	2294	−120	37	Advanced to playoffs

Updated to match(es) played on 25 May 2024. Source:

=== Results ===
Home \ Away	ARI	KOL	OLY	PAN	PER	PRO
Aris Thessaloniki	—	60–69		68–80		
Kolossos		—	66–100	74–79		
Olympiacos	85–77		—		91–83	80–69
Panathinaikos			77–71	—	93–88	90–82
Peristeri	75–82	98–90			—	92–94
Promitheas	84–51	96–73				—

Legend: Blue = home team win; Red = away team win.
Matches with lighter background shading were decided after overtime.

== Play-out ==
The teams ranked 7 through 12 from the regular season participate in the play-out. They play against each other once (5 matches per team). The 7th and 8th seeded teams advance to the GBL playoffs, and the team that finishes last gets relegated to the Elite League

Pos	Team	Pld	W	L	PF	PA	PD	Pts	Qualification or relegation
7	AEK	27	12	15	2355	2311	+44	39	Advanced to playoffs
8	PAOK	27	11	16	2042	2147	−105	38	Advanced to playoffs
9	Maroussi	27	10	17	2207	2305	−98	37	
10	A.S. Karditsas	27	10	17	2061	2171	−110	37	
11	Lavrio	27	10	17	2081	2288	−207	37	
12	Apollon Patras	27	4	23	1818	2291	−473	31	Relegated to the Elite League

Updated to match(es) played on 25 May 2025. Source:

=== Results ===
Home \ Away	AEK	APO	KAR	LAV	MAR	PAOK
AEK	—			100–67	88–85	99–91
Apollon Patras	89–79	—		66–104		
A.S. Karditsas	81–79	95–67	—			
Lavrio			88–95	—	76–90	89–85
Maroussi		77–73	91–70		—	
PAOK		87–63	85–70		77–62	—

Legend: Blue = home team win; Red = away team win.
Matches with lighter background shading were decided after overtime.

== Playoffs ==
The eight highest ranked teams (six from the play-in and two from the play-out) qualify for the playoffs. Quarterfinals and Semifinals are being played in a "best of 3" format, while the Finals are being played in a "best of 5" format.

=== Bracket ===
Quarter-finals
Panathinaikos	2
PAOK	0
Promitheas	1
Aris	2
Olympiacos	2
AEK	0
Peristeri	2
Kolossos	0

Semi-finals
Panathinaikos	2
Aris	0
Olympiacos	2
Peristeri	0

Final
Panathinaikos	3
Olympiacos	2
Third place
Peristeri	75
Aris	71

=== Quarterfinals (best of 3) ===
Team 1	Series	Team 2	Game 1	Game 2	Game 3
Panathinaikos	2–0	PAOK	84–66	99–96	
Promitheas	1–2	Aris	79–60	85–89	87–88
Olympiacos	2–0	AEK	92–75	100–68	
Peristeri	2–0	Kolossos	79–63	88–86	

=== Semifinals (best of 3) ===
Team 1	Series	Team 2	Game 1	Game 2	Game 3
Panathinaikos	2–0	Aris	89–71	80–65	
Olympiacos	2–0	Peristeri	83–72	84–71	

== Finals ==
Team 1	Series	Team 2	Game 1	Game 2	Game 3	Game 4	Game 5
Panathinaikos	3–2	Olympiacos	84–89	86–92	83–76	88–85	87–82

=== Game 1 ===
5 June 2024	Panathinaikos	84–89	Olympiacos
21:15	Scoring by quarter: 17–19, 20–27, 19–20, 28–23
	Pts: Nunn 21; Sloukas 16; Rebs: Mitoglou 10; Lessort 7 Asts: Grant 6 Sloukas 5	Boxscore	Pts: Walkup 17; Williams-Goss 16; Rebs: Milutinov 13; Papanikolaou 7 Asts: Walkup 5 Williams-Goss 5	Arena: O.A.C.A. Olympic Indoor Hall; Referees: Papapetrou; Karpanos; Theonas

=== Game 2 ===
7 June 2024	Olympiacos	92–86	Panathinaikos
21:30	Scoring by quarter: 21–24, 17–15, 24–16, 30–31
	Pts: Williams-Goss 19; Milutinov 17; Rebs: Milutinov 9 Peters 6 Asts: Walkup 3 Williams-Goss 3	Boxscore	Pts: Lessort 21; Nunn 13; Rebs: Lessort 9 Hernangomez 6 Asts: Nunn 5 Sloukas 5	Arena: Peace and Friendship Stadium; Referees: Tsaroucha; Tsolakos; Agrafiotis

=== Game 3 ===
10 June 2024	Panathinaikos	83–76	Olympiacos
21:15	Scoring by quarter: 23–18, 20–16, 18–25, 22–17
	Pts: Nunn 21; Lessort 17; Rebs: Lessort 7 Antetokounmpo 6 Asts: Sloukas 3	Boxscore	Pts: Milutinov 17; Canaan 14; Rebs: Walkup 7 Peters 5 Asts: Papanikolaou 3	Arena: O.A.C.A. Olympic Indoor Hall; Referees: Poursanidis; Pitsilkas; Magklogiannis

=== Game 4 ===
12 June 2024	Olympiacos	85–88	Panathinaikos
21:15	Scoring by quarter: 22–17, 29–27, 13–20, 21–24
	Pts: Larentzakis 13; Rebs: Papanikolaou 7 Petrusev 4 Asts: Papanikolaou 4	Boxscore	Pts: Nunn 25; Rebs: Hernangomez 7 Lessort 6 Asts: Nunn 4 Grant 4 Grigonis 4	Arena: Peace and Friendship Stadium; Referees: Papapetrou; Theonas; Magklogiannis

=== Game 5 ===
14 June 2024	Panathinaikos	87–82	Olympiacos
21:15	Scoring by quarter: 20–22, 28–17, 17–25, 22–18
	Pts: Sloukas 29; Grant 13; Nunn 13; Rebs: Mitoglou 9 Hernangomez 6 Asts: Nunn 5	Boxscore	Pts: Peters 21; Papanikolaou 18; Milutinov 17; Rebs: Milutinov 12; Peters 4 Asts: Walkup 10; McKissic 5	Arena: O.A.C.A. Olympic Indoor Hall; Referees: Poursanidis; Karpanos; Katrachouras

== Final standings ==
Pos	Team	Pld	W	L	Qualification or Relegation
1	Panathinaikos	34	33	1	Qualification to the EuroLeague
2	Olympiacos	34	28	6	Qualification to the EuroLeague
3	Peristeri	32	19	13	Qualification to the Basketball Champions League
4	Promitheas	30	18	12	Qualification to the Basketball Champions League
5	Aris	33	15	18	Qualification to the EuroCup
6	Kolossos	29	10	19	Qualification to the Basketball Champions League
7	AEK	29	12	17	Qualification to the Basketball Champions League
8	PAOK	29	11	18	Qualification to the Basketball Champions League Qualifying Rounds
9	Maroussi	27	10	17	Qualification to the FIBA Europe Cup
10	Karditsa	27	10	17	
11	Lavrion	27	10	17	
12	Apollon Patras	27	4	23	Relegation to the Greek A2 League

== Awards ==
All official awards of the 2023–24 Greek Basket League.

=== Greek League MVP ===
Player	Team
(Greece) Kostas Sloukas	Panathinaikos

=== Greek League Finals MVP ===
Player	Team
(United States) Kendrick Nunn	Panathinaikos

=== All-Greek League Team ===
Pos.	Player	Team
G	(Greece) Kostas Sloukas	Panathinaikos
G	(United States) Kendrick Nunn	Panathinaikos
F	(Greece) Kostas Papanikolaou	Olympiacos
F	(United States) Alec Peters	Olympiacos
C	(France) Mathias Lessort	Panathinaikos

=== Best Coach ===
Player	Team
(Turkey) Ergin Ataman	Panathinaikos

=== Defensive Player of the Year ===
Player	Team
(United States) Jerian Grant	Panathinaikos

=== Best Young Player ===
Player	Team
(Greece) Neoklis Avdalas	Karditsa

=== Most Improved Player ===
Player	Team
(Greece) Vassilis Toliopoulos	Aris

=== Most Popular Player ===
Player	Team
(United States) Kendrick Nunn	Panathinaikos

=== Most Spectacular Player ===
Player	Team
(France) Mathias Lessort	Panathinaikos

== Statistical leaders ==
The Greek Basket League counts official stats leaders by stats totals, and not by per game averages. It also counts the total stats for both regular season combined.

=== Performance index rating ===
Pos	Player	Club	PIR
1	(United States) Alec Peters	Olympiacos	416
2	(United States) Joe Ragland	Peristeri	374
3	(Austria) Luka Brajkovic	Kolossos	368
4	(United States) Shakur Juiston	Maroussi	365
5	(Serbia) Miroslav Raduljica	Maroussi	351

=== Points ===
Pos	Player	Club	Total Points
1	(United States) Hunter Hale	Promitheas	378
2	(United States) Anthony Cowan Jr.	Promitheas	322
3	(United States) Alec Peters	Olympiacos	315
4	(United States) Jordan McRae	AEK	311
5	(Serbia) Miroslav Raduljica	Maroussi	309

=== Rebounds ===
Pos	Player	Club	Total Rebounds
1	(United States) Chad Brown	Apollon Patras	166
2	(United States) Romello White	Karditsa	161
3	(United States) Shakur Juiston	Maroussi	159
4	(United States) Chris Coffey	Promitheas	149
5	(United States) Khalid Moore	Lavrio	148

=== Assists ===
Pos	Player	Club	Total Assists
1	(United States) Joe Ragland	Peristeri	184
2	(Iceland) Elvar Fridriksson	PAOK	137
3	(United States) London Perrantes	Kolossos Rodou	123
4	(United States) Anthony Cowan Jr.	Promitheas	122
5	(Greece) Vassilis Mouratos	Apollon Patras	113

== Clubs in international competitions ==
Team	Competition	Result
Panathinaikos	EuroLeague	Final Four, 1st place
Olympiacos	EuroLeague	Final Four, 3rd place
Aris	EuroCup	Playoffs, Eighthfinals
Peristeri	Champions League	Final Four, 4th place
Promitheas	Champions League	Playoffs, Quarterfinals
AEK	Champions League	Round of 16
PAOK	Champions League	Play-ins

== See also ==
- 2023 Greek Basketball Super Cup
- 2023–24 Greek Basketball Cup
