= Jalen Lecque =

American basketball player (born 2000)

No. 0 – Iraklis Thessaloniki
- Position: Point guard / shooting guard
- League: Greek Basketball League; FIBA Europe Cup

Personal information
- Born: 13 June 2000 (age 26) Manhattan, New York, U.S.
- Listed height: 6 ft 4 in (1.93 m)
- Listed weight: 185 lb (84 kg)

Career information
- High school: Monsignor Scanlan (The Bronx, New York); Christ School (Arden, North Carolina); Brewster Academy (Wolfeboro, New Hampshire)
- NBA draft: 2019: undrafted
- Playing career: 2019–present

Career history
- 2019–2020: Phoenix Suns
- 2019–2020: →Northern Arizona Suns
- 2020–2021: Indiana Pacers
- 2021: →Fort Wayne Mad Ants
- 2021–2022: Wisconsin Herd
- 2022–2024: Rio Grande Valley Vipers
- 2024–2025: Hapoel Afula
- 2025–2026: Büyükçekmece
- 2026–present: Iraklis Thessaloniki
- Stats at NBA.com
- Stats at Basketball Reference

Jalen Evander Lecque (born June 13, 2000) is an American professional basketball player for Iraklis Thessaloniki of the Greek Basketball League (GBL) and the FIBA Europe Cup. A consensus four-star recruit and former NC State commit, Lecque chose to forgo college basketball and immediately entered the 2019 NBA draft.

== Early life ==
Lecque was born in Manhattan, New York and lived in the Bronx until he was three years old. Both of his parents worked in Harlem, his father at a barbershop and his mother at a hospital. As a toddler, Lecque moved with his family to Teaneck, New Jersey, where he attended elementary and middle school.

== High school career ==
Instead of attending his local school Teaneck High School, Lecque decided to enroll at Monsignor Scanlan High School in The Bronx because of its superior basketball program. In the 2016–17 season, he averaged about 11 points per game. In April 2017, Lecque saw breakout success with Southern Stampede at the Nike Elite Youth Basketball League (EYBL), helping him gain interest from many prominent NCAA Division I programs.

Entering the 2017–18 season, Lecque transferred to Christ School in Arden, North Carolina while reclassifying from the 2018 to 2019 class. He was drawn to the school for not only basketball, but also academics. Lecque averaged 20.1 points, 9.1 rebounds, and 9.3 assists per game, leading his team to the 3A North Carolina Independent School Athletic Association (NCISAA) state semifinals. He was named Asheville Citizen-Times All-Western North Carolina (WNC) Player of the Year and earned NCISAA All-State honors.

On July 30, 2018, Lecque announced that he would transfer to Brewster Academy in Wolfeboro, New Hampshire for his senior season.

On April 20, 2019, Lecque declared for the 2019 NBA draft. On May 29, 2019, he remained in the NBA draft past the withdrawal deadline, ensuring that he would not play at the college level.

On May 8, 2019, Lecque was named one of 77 total players participating in the NBA Draft Combine later in the month. He recorded a 43-inch maximum vertical leap, the highest at the combine, and left the combine early after receiving positive feedback from NBA teams.

=== Recruiting ===
College recruiting
Name	Hometown	School	Height	Weight	Commit date
Jalen Lecque; PG	The Bronx, NY	Brewster Academy (NH)	6 ft 4 in (1.93 m)	190 lb (86 kg)	Oct 2, 2018
Jalen Lecque; PG	Recruit ratings: Rivals: 247Sports: ESPN: (88)				
Overall recruit ranking: Rivals: 40 247Sports: 44 ESPN: 42
Note: In many cases, Scout, Rivals, 247Sports, On3, and ESPN may conflict in their listings of height and weight.; In these cases, the average was taken. ESPN grades are on a 100-point scale.; Sources: "NC State 2019 Basketball Commitments". Rivals.; "2019 NC State Wildcats Recruiting Class". ESPN.; "2019 Team Ranking". Rivals.

== Professional career ==
=== NBA and G League ===
==== Phoenix Suns (2019–2020) ====
Lecque committed to play college basketball for the North Carolina State Wolfpack as a freshman for the 2019–2020 season, but instead, because of his eligibility and age decided to abstain from a collegiate career and rescind his commitment. Lecque was not drafted in the 2019 NBA draft on June 20. He was signed to a 4-year deal, 2 years guaranteed, by the Phoenix Suns on July 6. On October 28, Lecque was assigned to the Northern Arizona Suns for the start of the 2019–20 NBA G League season. Lecque was recalled to Phoenix on multiple assignments throughout the season. Lecque made his NBA debut on January 16, playing in only two minutes for the Suns' 121–98 win over the New York Knicks.

==== Indiana Pacers (2020–2021) ====
On November 16, 2020, Lecque was traded to the Oklahoma City Thunder alongside Ty Jerome, Ricky Rubio, Kelly Oubre Jr., and a 2022 first-round pick in exchange for Chris Paul and Abdel Nader.

On November 25, 2020, Lecque was traded to the Indiana Pacers in exchange for T. J. Leaf and a future second-round pick. On March 25, 2021, Lecque was waived by the Pacers.

==== Wisconsin Herd (2021–2022) ====
On October 15, 2021, Lecque signed a training camp deal with the Milwaukee Bucks. He joined the Wisconsin Herd as an affiliate player.

Lecque joined the Dallas Mavericks for the 2022 NBA Summer League.

==== Rio Grande Valley Vipers (2022–2024) ====
On November 3, 2022, Lecque was named to the opening night roster for the Rio Grande Valley Vipers.

=== International Career ===
==== Hapoel Afula (2024–2025) ====
On August 29, 2024, Lecque signed with Hapoel Afula of the Israeli Basketball Premier League. In 21 games with Hapoel, he had 15.3 points, 3.4 rebounds, 3.1 assists, and 1.2 steals per game.

=== Büyükçekmece (2025–2026) ===
On August 23, 2025, he signed with ONVO Büyükçekmece of the Basketbol Süper Ligi. He finished his season with 15.7 points, 3.4 rebounds and 2 assists per game in 24 matches.

==== Iraklis (2026–2027) ====
On July 02, 2026, Iraklis of the GBL, announced that Leque signed for the team for the 2026-27 season.

== Career statistics ==
Legend
GP	Games played	GS	Games started	MPG	Minutes per game
FG%	Field goal percentage	3P%	3-point field goal percentage	FT%	Free throw percentage
RPG	Rebounds per game	APG	Assists per game	SPG	Steals per game
BPG	Blocks per game	PPG	Points per game	**Bold**	Career high

=== NBA ===
==== Regular season ====
Year	Team	GP	GS	MPG	FG%	3P%	FT%	RPG	APG	SPG	BPG	PPG
2019–20	Phoenix	**5**	0	**6.2**	**.400**	.000	**1.000**	.4	.4	.0	.0	**2.0**
2020–21	Indiana	4	0	3.0	.111	.000	**1.000**	**1.3**	**.5**	.0	.0	1.3
Career		9	0	4.9	.263	.000	1.000	.8	.4	.0	.0	1.7
