= Nikos Papanikolopoulos =

Greek basketball player

Nikos Papanikolopoulos Νίκος Παπανικολόπουλος
ASK Karditsas
- Title: Head coach
- League: Greek Basketball League

Personal information
- Born: April 21, 1979 (age 47) Kalamata, Greece
- Listed height: 6 ft 5 in (1.96 m)
- Listed weight: 210 lb (95 kg)

Career information
- Playing career: 1997–2014
- Position: Point guard / shooting guard
- Number: 4
- Coaching career: 2014–present

Career history

Playing
- 1997–1998: Near East
- 1998–2000: AEK Athens
- 2000–2001: Aris
- 2001–2003: Near East
- 2003–2004: Ionikos NF
- 2004–2005: Olympiacos
- 2005–2006: Gymnastikos
- 2007: Teramo Basket
- 2007–2008: AEL 1964
- 2008–2009: Kolossos
- 2009–2010: Peristeri
- 2010–2011: Iraklis
- 2011–2012: Ilysiakos
- 2012–2013: Panelefsiniakos
- 2013–2014: Ikaros Chalkidas

Coaching
- 2014–2018: Koroivos Amaliadas (assistant)
- 2018–2019: Peristeri (assistant)
- 2019–2020: Peristeri
- 2020–2021: Larisa
- 2023–present: Karditsa

Career highlights
- As player: FIBA Saporta Cup champion (2000); Greek Cup winner (2000); Greek 2nd Division champion (1998)
Medals
Men's basketball
Representing Greece
Mediterranean Games
Silver medal – second place	2005 Almería	Under-26

Nikolaos "Nikos" Papanikolopoulos (Greek: Νικόλαος "Νίκος" Παπανικολόπουλος; born April 21, 1979) is a retired Greek professional basketball player and current basketball coach. During his playing career, at a height of 1.96 m (6 ft 5 in) tall, he played at the point guard and shooting guard positions.

== Professional career ==
During his professional playing career, Papanikolopoulos played with the following clubs: Near East, AEK Athens, Aris, Ionikos NF, Olympiacos, Gymnastikos S. Larissas, AEL, Teramo, Kolossos, Peristeri, Iraklis, Ilysiakos, Panelefsiniakos, and Ikaros Chalkidas.

During his playing career, he won the Greek 2nd Division championship in 1998, and the Greek Cup title and the European-wide secondary level FIBA Saporta Cup championship in the 1999–2000 season.

== National team career ==
Papanikolopoulos played with Greece's under-26 national team at the 2005 Mediterranean Games. He also played with the senior men's Greek national basketball team.

== Coaching career ==
Papanikolopoulos served as an assistant coach at Koroivos Amaliadas, in the Greek Basket League, from 2014 until 2016, before he was appointed as the head coach of the team in May 2016. He became the head coach of Peristeri in 2019.

On January 3, 2023, he was appointed as the new head coach of Karditsa.
