= K. J. Jackson =

American basketball player (born 1998)

ASK Karditsas
- Position: Shooting guard / point guard
- League: Greek Basketball League

Personal information
- Born: March 27, 1998 (age 28)
- Listed height: 6 ft 2 in (1.88 m)
- Listed weight: 198 lb (90 kg)

Career information
- High school: Hightower (Missouri City, Texas)
- College: Temple College (2016–2018); UMBC (2018–2020)
- NBA draft: 2020: undrafted
- Playing career: 2020–present

Career history
- 2020–2021: Sibiu
- 2021–2022: Steaua București
- 2022–2023: Kobrat
- 2023–2024: Aix Maurienne Savoie Basket
- 2024: Titanes del Distrito Nacional
- 2024–2025: Soproni
- 2025: PAOK Thessaloniki
- 2025–2026: GTK Gliwice
- 2026–present: Karditsa

Career highlights
- 2× Second-team All-America East (2019, 2020)

Kaelin Nolan Jackson (born March 27, 1998) is an American professional basketball player for Karditsa of the Greek Basketball League. He played college basketball for Temple College and UMBC.

== High school career ==
Jackson attended Hightower High School and played basketball and football. As a senior wide receiver in 2015, he helped the Hurricanes finish with an undefeated season. On the basketball court, Jackson was named district MVP as a senior and led the team to a 32–5 record. He committed to play football at West Texas A&M on February 6, 2016. However, Jackson ultimately reconsidered and opted to play college basketball instead. His only option was to play junior college basketball, so he committed to Temple College after its coach Kirby Johnson noticed him while recruiting another player.

== College career ==
Jackson averaged a team-leading 19.5 points per game as a freshman. He was recruited by UMBC, but decided to return to Temple for his sophomore season. UMBC did not have a scholarship for him at the time. As a sophomore, Jackson finished fifth in the nation with 25.8 points per game. He became Temple’s all-time scoring leader with 1,404 points. Jackson committed to the Retrievers after the season. He watched UMBC upset Virginia in the NCAA Tournament to become the first 16 seed to beat a 1 seed while at a Buffalo Wild Wings, wearing UMBC apparel.

On December 8, 2018, he scored a UMBC career-high 31 points in a 91–76 win against Drexel. Jackson averaged 12.8 points, 3.8 rebounds, and 3.1 assists per game as a junior. He was named to the Second Team All-America East. As a senior, Jackson averaged 13.8 points, 4.4 rebounds, 4.2 assists, and 1.7 steals per game. He was again named to the Second Team All-America East.

== Professional career ==
On August 15, 2020, Jackson signed his first professional contract with CSU Sibiu of the Liga Națională. He averaged 11.5 points, 3.8 assists, 2.8 rebounds, and 1.3 steals per game. On August 4, 2021, Jackson signed with CSA Steaua București. He averaged 15 points, 4.5 assists, 3.5 rebounds and 2.0 steals per game. On July 31, 2022, Jackson signed with Kobrat of the Korisliiga.

On May 25, 2023, Jackson signed with Aix Maurienne Savoie Basket of the French LNB Pro B. On June 28, 2024, Jackson signed with Titanes del Distrito Nacional of the Dominican Liga Nacional de Baloncesto. In October 2024, Jackson signed with Soproni KC of the Nemzeti Bajnokság I/A.

On July 12, 2025, Jackson signed with Greek club PAOK. On December 12, 2025, his contract was terminated by mutual agreement.

On December 21, 2025, he signed with GTK Gliwice of the Polish Basketball League (PLK).
