= Thomas Kottas =

Greek basketball player

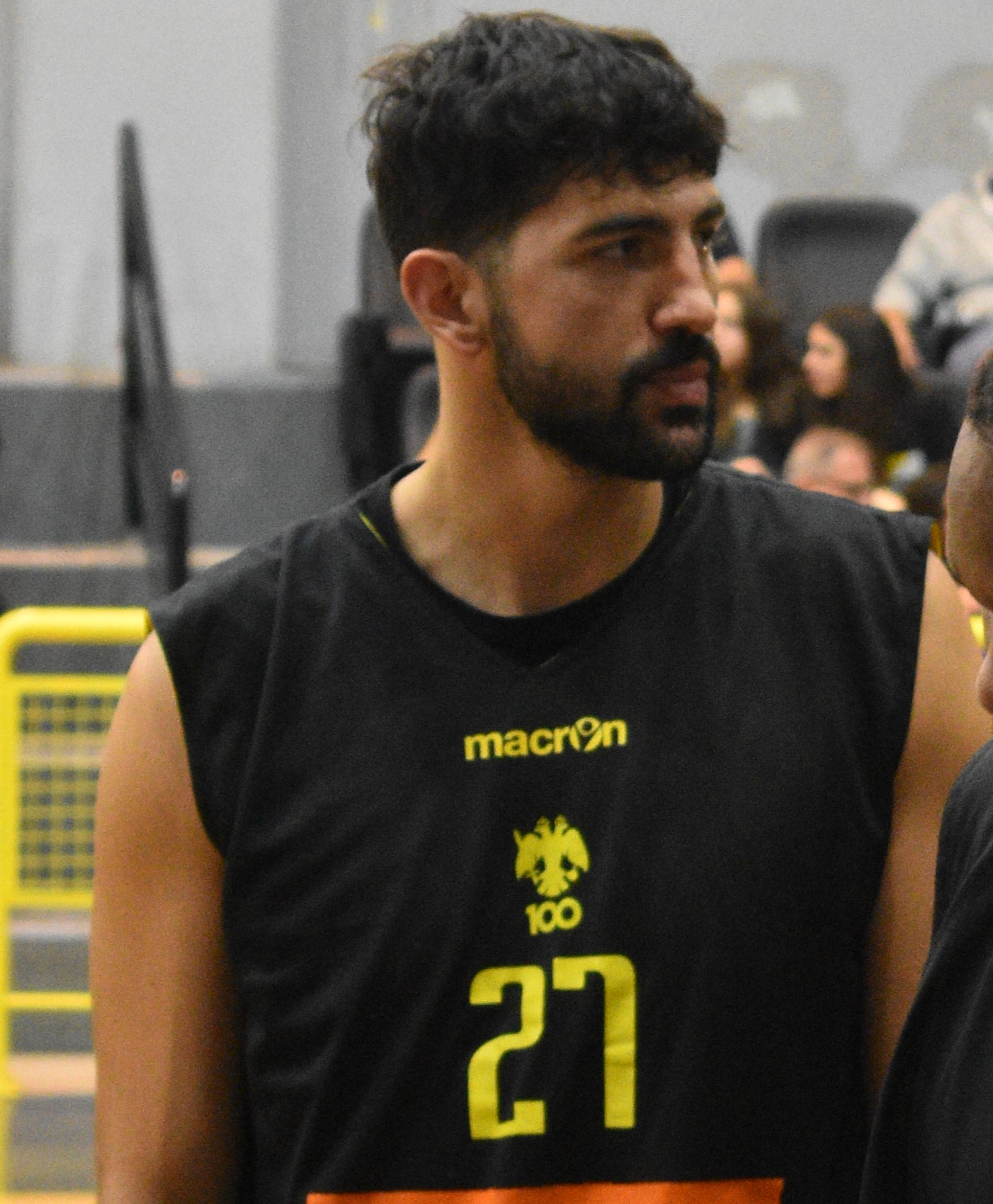
- Kottas in 2023

Personal information
- Born: 27 April 1996 (age 30) Ptolemaida, Greece
- Listed height: 2.08 m (6 ft 10 in)
- Listed weight: 113 kg (249 lb)

Career information
- Playing career: 2013–present
- Position: Center

Career history
- 2013–2016: PAOK Thessaloniki
- 2016–2018: Rethymno
- 2018–2019: Holargos
- 2019–2020: Ionikos Nikaias
- 2020–2021: Larisa
- 2021–2022: Aris Thessaloniki
- 2022: Karditsa
- 2022–2023: CSM Târgu Jiu
- 2023: AEK Athens
- 2023–2025: Iraklis
Medals
Representing Greece
Men's basketball
FIBA Europe Under-20 Championship B
Bronze medal – third place	2016 Greece	Under-16

Thomas Kottas (Greek: Θωμάς Κώττας; born 27 April 1996) is a Greek professional basketball player. He is a 2.08 m (6 ft 10 in) tall center.

== Professional career ==
Kottas began playing basketball with the youth teams of APS Ajax Amynteo. He then transferred to play with the youth teams of PAOK Thessaloniki in the summer of 2011. After playing with the junior teams of PAOK Thessaloniki, Kottas began his professional career in 2013, with the senior men's team of PAOK. He left the club after 3 years, due to his limited playing time.

On 26 July 2016, Kottas joined Rethymno Cretan Kings of the Greek Basket League. On 17 July 2018, Kottas signed with the newly promoted team Holargos. On 3 August 2019, Kottas moved to Ionikos Nikaias. He averaged 3.8 points and 2.4 rebounds per game.

On 27 August 2020, Kottas signed with Larisa. In 21 games, he averaged 3.4 points and 3.1 rebounds per contest. On 26 July 2021, Kottas signed with Aris, returning to Thessaloniki. In 24 games, he averaged 2.7 points, 2.4 rebounds and 0.6 blocks in under 10 minutes per contest.

On August 29, 2022, Kottas signed with Karditsa. On November 3 of the same year, he moved to Romanian club CSM Târgu Jiu for the rest of the season.

On September 5, 2023, Kottas moved to AEK Athens. His contract was terminated on December 11, 2023. On the same day, Kottas signed a two-year deal with Iraklis.

== National team career ==
Kottas has been a member of the Greek junior national teams. With Greece's junior national teams, he played at the 2012 FIBA Europe Under-16 Championship, and both the 2013 and 2014 FIBA Europe Under-18 Championships. He also played at the 2015 FIBA Under-19 World Cup, the 2015 FIBA Europe Under-20 Championship, and the 2nd division 2016 FIBA Europe Under-20 Championship Division B, where he won a bronze medal.

== Awards and accomplishments ==
=== Greek national team ===
- 2016 FIBA Europe Under-20 Championship Division B: Bronze
