= Andreas Petropoulos =

Greek basketball player (born 1996)

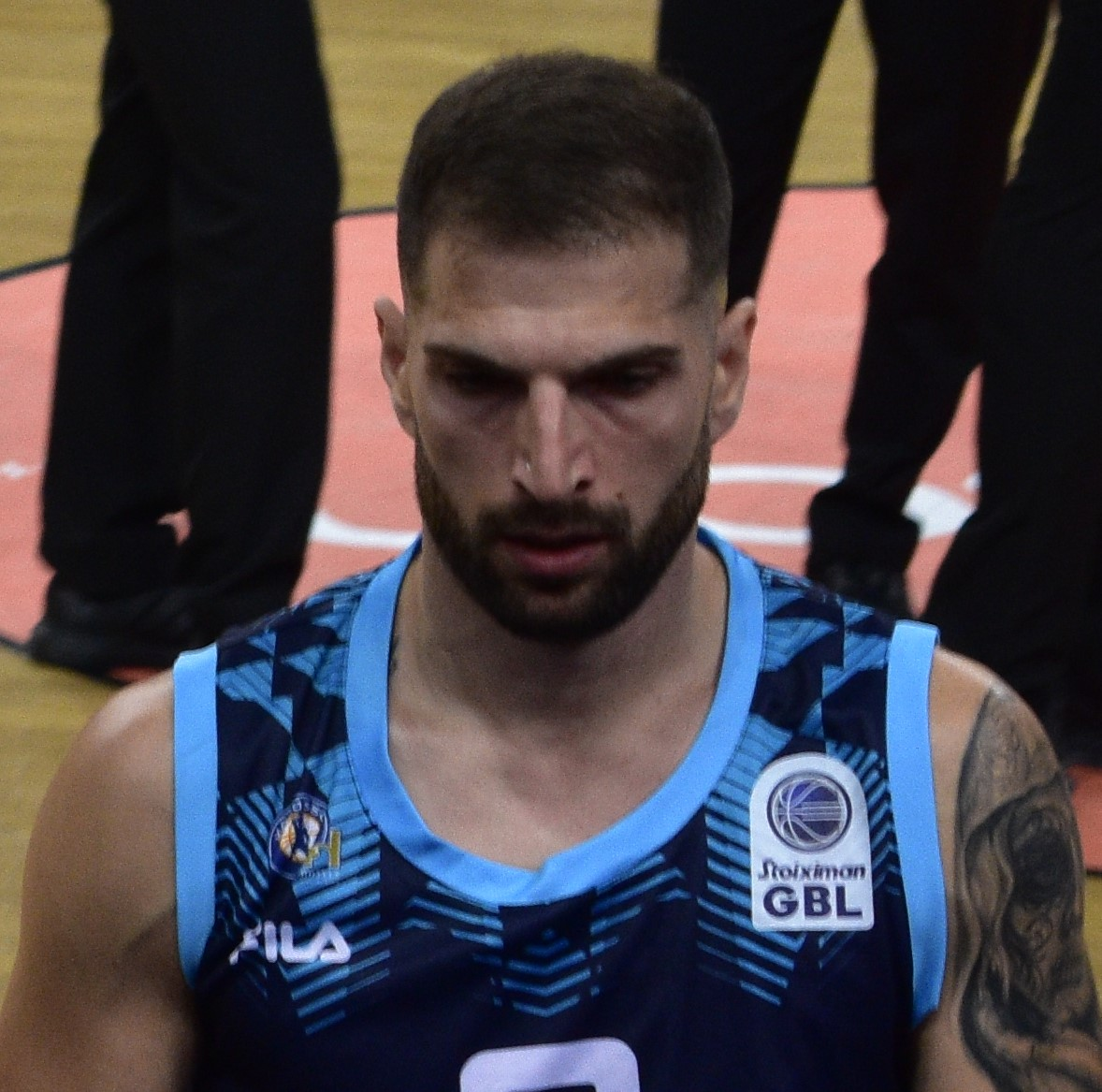
- Petropoulos with Kolossos Rodou

ASK Karditsas
- Position: Small forward / Shooting guard
- League: GBL

Personal information
- Born: 11 February 1994 (age 32) Greece
- Listed height: 6 ft 5 in (1.96 m)
- Listed weight: 220 lb (100 kg)

Career information
- Playing career: 2013–present

Career history
- 2013–2014: Pagrati
- 2014–2015: Panionios
- 2015–2016: Doxa Lefkadas
- 2016–2017: Ionikos Nikaias
- 2017–2018: Doxa Lefkadas
- 2018–2019: Kastoria
- 2019–2020: Olympiacos B
- 2020–2021: Ionikos Nikaias
- 2021–2023: AEK Athens
- 2023–2026: Kolossos Rodou
- 2026–present: Karditsa

Andreas Petropoulos (Greek: Ανδρέας Πετρόπουλος; born 11 February 1994) is a Greek professional basketball player for Karditsa of the Greek Basketball League. He is a 1.96 metres (6 feet 5 inches) tall swingman.

== Professional career ==
Petropoulos began his pro career in 2013, with the Greek 2nd Division club Pagrati. In 2014, he debuted in the top-tier level Greek Basket League with Panionios. He joined Olympiacos' new reserve team of the Greek 2nd Division, Olympiacos B, for the 2019–20 season. Petropoulos averaged 12.2 points, 3.8 rebounds and 1.7 assists per game.

On 27 August 2020, he signed with Ionikos Nikaias.

On 13 August 2021, Petropoulos signed a one-year contract with AEK Athens. On 1 April 2022 he renewed his contract through 2024. In 23 league games, he averaged 4.1 points and 2.5 rebounds in 18 minutes per contest. During the 2022–2023 season, in 17 league games, he averaged 1.3 points and 0.8 rebounds in 8 minutes per contest.

On 12 July 2023, Petropoulos was released from AEK and signed a two-year deal with Kolossos Rodou. On 7 June 2025 he renewed his contract until 2026.

After 3 years with the club, he joined Karditsa of the Greek Basketball League in 2026.
