= Lavrio Indoor Hall =

"Indoor sporting arena Lavrio, Attica, Greece"

- Kleisto Gymnastirio Lavriou
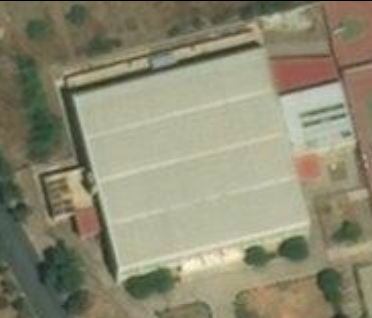
- Interactive map of Lavrio Indoor Hall
- Full name: Kleisto Gymnastirio Dimou Lavreotiki
- Location: Lavrio, Attica, Greece
- Coordinates: 37.7166°N 24.0501°E
- Owner: Lavreotiki Municipality
- Capacity: 1,700
- Surface: Parquet

Construction
- Renovated: 2015, 2018

Tenant
- Lavrio

Lavrio Indoor Hall, or Kleisto Gymnastirio Lavriou (Greek: Κλειστό Γυμναστήριο Λαυρίου), is an indoor sporting arena that is located in the city of Lavrio, Attica, Greece. The seating capacity of the arena for basketball games is 1,700 people. The arena is owned by the municipality of Lavreotiki.

== History ==
The arena has been used as the home arena of the Greek professional basketball team Lavrio, of the Greek Basketball League.
