= ASK Karditsas B.C. =

Basketball club in Greece

AS Karditsas
- Nickname: Blue Brothers
- Leagues: Greek Basketball League
- Founded: 2006; 20 years ago
- History: A.S. Karditsas (2006–present)
- Arena: Giannis Bourousis Karditsa New Indoor Arena
- Capacity: 3,500
- Location: Karditsa, Greece
- Team colors: White and Blue
- Main sponsor: Iaponiki (Ιαπωνική Α.Ε.)
- President: Vasilis Tsigaras
- Vice-presidents: Thomas Deligiannis & Christos Zisis
- General manager: George Christoulas
- Head coach: Nikos Papanikolopoulos
- Team captain: Leonidas Kaselakis
- 2025-26 position: 11
- Championships: 1 Greek 2nd Division
- Website: www.askarditsas.gr
Home	Away

A.S. Karditsas (Greek: Α.Σ. Καρδίτσας K.A.E.), is a Greek professional basketball club that is based in Karditsa, Greece. The club's full name is Athlitikos Syllogos Karditsas (Αθλητικός Σύλλογος Καρδίτσας), which is also abbreviated as A.S.K. (Α.Σ.Κ), or A.S. Karditsas (Α.Σ. Καρδίτσας). The club's colors are white and blue.

== History ==
ASK Karditsas was founded in its current form in 2006, as a result of a merger between the clubs Α.S. Karditsas 21st Century and Amila Karditsas. Α.S. Karditsas 21st Century and Amila Karditsas were themselves formed from earlier mergers. Α.S. Karditsas 21st Century was formed from a merger between Aiada Karditsas and Sports Club Karditsas, while Amila Karditsas was formed from a merger between G.S. Karditsas (where the well-known Greek player Giannis Bourousis began playing youth team basketball), Anagennisi Karditsas, and Amila Karditsas. As a result, it is generally considered that the present club incorporates the history and tradition of all of the previous clubs.

The club played in the 4th-tier Greek C Basket League, during the 2014–15 season. The club was promoted to the third-tier Greek B Basket League, for the 2016–17 season. The club was then promoted to the 2nd-tier Greek A2 Basket League, for the 2017–18 season.

Karditsa won the Greek 2nd Division's 2021–22 season championship. Thus, they were promoted to the top-tier Greek Basket League, for the 2022–23 season.

Karditsa qualified to European competitions for the first time, competing in the Basketball Champions League in the following 2025–26 season.

== Arenas ==
During the Greek 2nd Division's 2019–20 season, the club moved into the Giannis Bourousis Karditsa New Indoor Arena, which including collapsible seats, has a total seating capacity of 3,500 people.

== Season by season ==
Season	Tier	Division	Pos.	W–L	Greek Cup	European competitions
2014–15	4	C Basket League	8th	12–14		
2015–16	4	C Basket League	2nd	20–2		
2016–17	3	B Basket League	2nd	24–6		
2017–18	2	A2 Basket League	10th	14–16		
2018–19	2	A2 Basket League	4th	17–15		
2019–20	2	A2 Basket League	5th	11–10		
2020–21	2	A2 Basket League	8th	10–10		
2021–22	2	A2 Basket League	1st	24–4		
2022–23	1	Basket League	10th	5–17		
2023–24	1	Basket League	10th	10-17		
2024–25	1	Basket League	5th	11–11		

== Honors and titles ==
=== Domestic competitions ===
- Greek 2nd Division Champion: (1)
  - (2021–22)
- Greek 3rd Division Runner-up: (1)
  - (2016–17)
- Greek 4th Division Runner-up: (1)
  - (2015–16)

== Roster ==
Note: Flags indicate national team eligibility at FIBA-sanctioned events. Players may hold other non-FIBA nationalities not displayed.

ASK Karditsas roster
Players
Coaches

Pos.	No.	Nat.	Name	Ht.	Wt.	Age
SG	0	(United States)	Jackson, K. J.	1.88 m (6 ft 2 in)	90 kg (198 lb)	28 – 27 March 1998
SG	1	(United States)	Turner, Justin	1.93 m (6 ft 4 in)	93 kg (205 lb)	28 – 12 March 1998
PF	5	(United States)	Smith, Chris	2.06 m (6 ft 9 in)	98 kg (216 lb)	26 – 24 December 1999
SF	8	(Greece)	Pasagiannis, Manolis	1.98 m (6 ft 6 in)		20 – 7 September 2006
SF	7	(United States)	McRae, Jordan	1.96 m (6 ft 5 in)	81 kg (179 lb)	35 – 28 March 1991
PG	8	(Greece)	Gkikas, Nikos	1.86 m (6 ft 1 in)	81 kg (179 lb)	35 – 22 November 1990
G/F	9	(Greece)	Petropoulos, Andreas	1.96 m (6 ft 5 in)	100 kg (220 lb)	32 – 11 February 1994
C	10	(United States)	Francis, Ja'Vier	2.03 m (6 ft 8 in)	107 kg (236 lb)	22 – 20 October 2003
PG	11	(Greece)	Bilalis, Konstantinos	1.85 m (6 ft 1 in)	79 kg (174 lb)	22 – 22 March 2004
PF	12	(Greece)	Kampouridis, Konstantinos	2.04 m (6 ft 8 in)	102 kg (225 lb)	27 – 24 June 1999
F	17	(Greece)	Roumoglou, Apostolos	2.03 m (6 ft 8 in)	98 kg (216 lb)	23 – 15 March 2003
C	33	(Nigeria)	Okoro, Francis	2.06 m (6 ft 9 in)	104 kg (229 lb)	27 – 7 August 1999

Head coach

- (Greece) Nikos Papanikolopoulos

Assistant coach(es)

- (Greece) Kostas Papamarkos
- (Greece) Giannis Missas
- (Greece) Kostas Serifis

Legend

- (C) Team captain
- Injured

- Roster
Updated: August 1, 2026

=== Depth chart ===
Pos.	Starting 5	Bench 1	Bench 2
C	Ja'Vier Francis	Francis Okoro	Thanasis Mpatategas
PF	Chris Smith	Apostolos Roumoglou	Konstantinos Kampouridis
SF	Jordan McRae	Andreas Petropoulos
SG	Justin Turner	Tyler Nelson
PG	K. J. Jackson	Nikos Gkikas	Konstantinos Bilalis

== Notable players ==
Note: Flags indicate national team eligibility at FIBA-sanctioned events. Players may hold other non-FIBA nationalities not displayed.

Criteria

To appear in this section a player must have either:

- Set a club record or won an individual award while at the club
- Played at least one official international match for their national team at any time
- Played at least one official NBA match at any time.

- Giannis Bourousis
- Giannis Agravanis
- Giannis Athinaiou
- Neoklis Avdalas
- Giorgos Gkiouzelis
- Costis Gontikas
- Dimitris Gravas
- Vlado Janković
- Nikos Kalles
- Theodoros Karras
- Leonidas Kaselakis
- Thomas Kottas
- Spyros Magkounis
- Zisis Sarikopoulos
- Alexis Spyridonidis
- Theodoros Tsiloulis
- Dimitrios Verginis
- (Finland) Alexander Madsen
- Milovan Drašković
- Stefan Đorđević
- David Gabrovšek
- Marek Klassen
- Sam Mennenga
- Francis Okoro
- James Batemon III
- Shaq Buchanan
- Javin DeLaurier
- Sean Evans
- Roberto Gallinat
- Langston Hall
- Tevin Mack
- Ray McCallum Jr.
- Lamar Peters
- Sayeed Pridgett
- Jordan Sibert
- Nate Watson
- Romello White
- Demajeo Wiggins

== Head coaches ==
Head Coach	Years
(Greece) Spyros Pappas	2014
(Greece) Charis Foros	2014–2016
(Greece) Kostas Roumeliotis	2016–2017
(Greece) Lefteris Kalogirou	2017–2018
(Greece) Ioannis Tzimas	2018–2019
(Greece) Kostas Komodietas	2020–2021
(Greece) Dimitris Liogas	2021–2022
(Greece) Vangelis Angelou	2022–2023
(Greece) Nikos Papanikolopoulos	2023–present
