= Maroussi Saint Thomas Indoor Hall =

Sports arean in Marousi, Attica Region, Greece

- Maroussi Indoor Hall
- Interactive map of Maroussi Saint Thomas Indoor Hall
- Full name: Maroussi Agios Thomas Indoor Hall
- Location: Marousi, Greece
- Coordinates: 38°02′27″N 23°47′56.3″E
- Owner: Municipality of Maroussi
- Capacity: Basketball: 1,700
- Surface: Parquet

Construction
- Opened: 1998
- Renovated: 2017

Tenants
- Maroussi BC (1998–present); Panathinaikos men's volleyball (2019–2023); Panathinaikos women's volleyball (2019–2023)

Maroussi Saint Thomas Indoor Hall, or Maroussi Agios Thomas Indoor Hall (alternate spelling: Marousi), is an indoor sporting arena that is located in Marousi, Greece. The arena is only about 500 m (1,600 ft) away from the Athens Olympic Sports Complex, which is also known as the OAKA, and the Nikos Galis Olympic Indoor Hall. The arena is primarily used to host basketball games. The indoor hall is owned by the municipality of Maroussi. The seating capacity of the indoor basketball arena is 1,700 people.

== History ==
The arena was opened in the year 1998, when the Greek basketball club, Maroussi, was most recently promoted to the top-tier level Greek Basket League. It has been the home arena of Maroussi since then. The arena was renovated in 2017.
