= Peristeri Indoor Hall Andreas Papandreou =

Indoor hall in Peristeri, Athens, Greece

Peristeri Arena
- Peristeriou
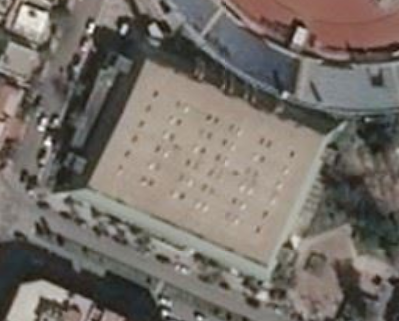
- Interactive map of Peristeri Arena
- Full name: Peristeri Indoor Hall Andreas Papandreou
- Location: Peristeri, Athens, Greece
- Coordinates: 38°0′13.23″N 23°41′19.67″E
- Capacity: Basketball: 4,000
- Surface: Parquet

Construction
- Opened: 1989

Tenants
- Peristeri Athens (1989–present)

Peristeri Indoor Hall Andreas Papandreou, or Peristeri Arena, is an indoor sporting arena that is located in Peristeri, a western suburban town in the Athens agglomeration, Greece. The arena is named after Andreas Papandreou, the former Prime Minister of Greece, who died in 1996. It is located next to Peristeri Stadium. It is owned by the municipality of Peristeri. The seating capacity of the arena for basketball games is 4,000.

== History ==
The arena was opened in the year 1989. It has been the long-time home arena of the Greek Basket League professional club team Peristeri Athens. The arena has hosted big events, like EuroLeague games, when Peristeri competed in the league, in the early 2000s. Other Greek basketball teams, like Panellinios Athens (for EuroCup games) and Panelefsiniakos, have also used the arena to host home games over the years.
