= Giannis Bourousis Karditsa New Indoor Arena =

Sports facility in Greece

Giannis Bourousis Karditsa New Indoor Sports Arena Νέο Κλειστό Γυμναστήριο Καρδίτσας Ιωάννης Μπουρούσης
- Giannis Bourousis Karditsa New Indoor Sports Hall
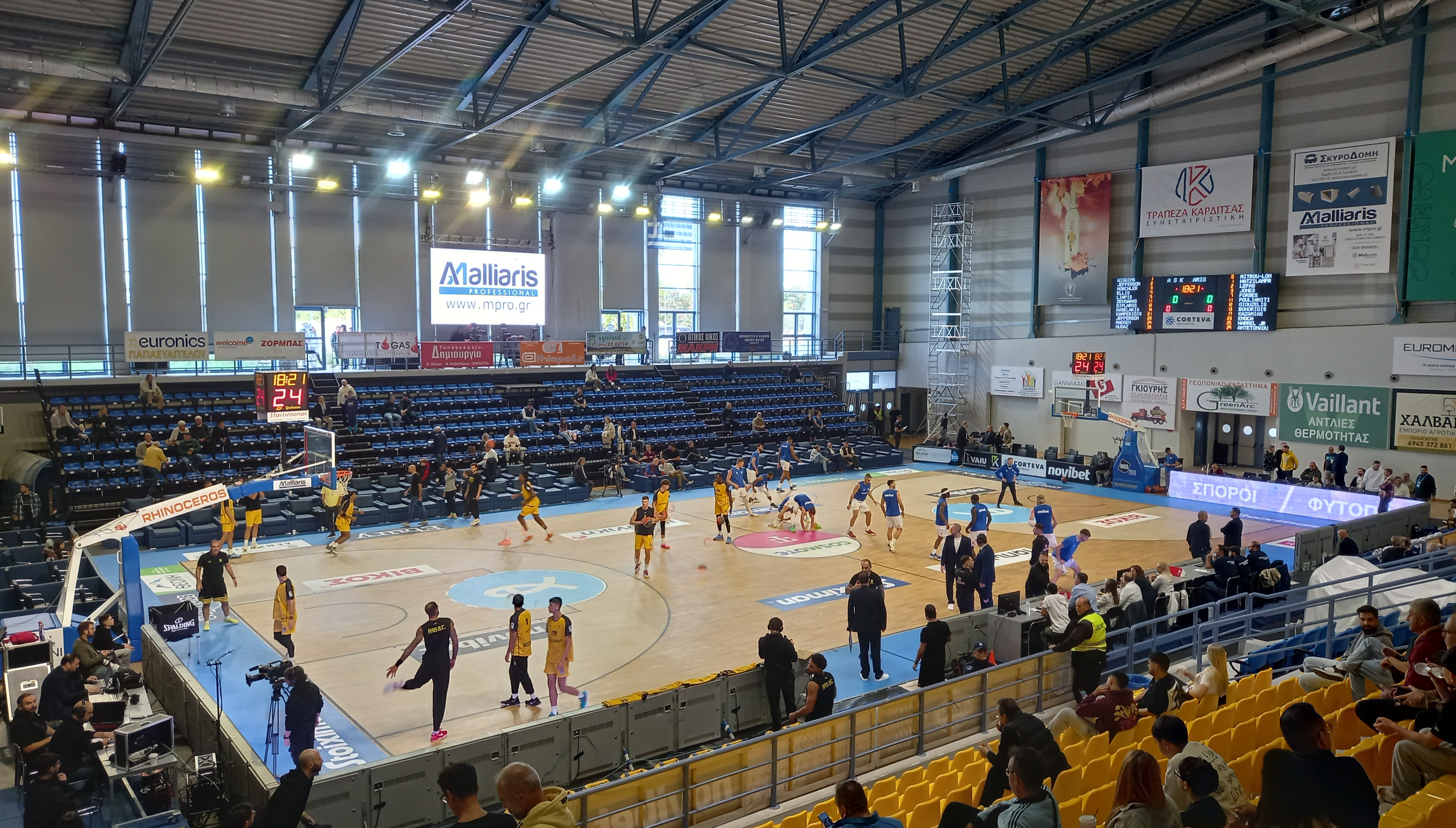
- Interactive map of Giannis Bourousis Karditsa New Indoor Sports Arena; Νέο Κλειστό Γυμναστήριο Καρδίτσας Ιωάννης Μπουρούσης
- Full name: Giannis Bourousis Karditsa Municipal Indoor Sports Hall
- Former names: Karditsa New Indoor Sports Arena Νέο Κλειστό Γυμναστήριο Καρδίτσας (2019–2022)
- Location: Agia Paraskevi, Karditsa, Thessaly, Greece
- Coordinates: 39.3592°N 21.9049°E
- Capacity: Concerts: 4,680; Basketball: 3,500
- Surface: Parquet

Construction
- Opened: 2 November 2019
- Expanded: 2023
- Cost: 7.5 million euros (2019)
- Architects: Koliopoulos & Trofoniou

Tenant
- Karditsa (2019–present)

Giannis Bourousis Karditsa Municipal Indoor Sports Hall, or Giannis Bourousis Karditsa Municipal Indoor Sports Arena (Greek: Νέο Κλειστό Γυμναστήριο Καρδίτσας Ιωάννης Μπουρούσης), is a multi-purpose and multi-sport indoor arena that is located in the Agia Paraskevi neighborhood of Karditsa, Thessaly, Greece. The arena can be used to host cultural events, concerts and handball, volleyball, and basketball games. It is mainly used to host basketball games.

The arena's seating capacity for basketball games is 3,500. Its capacity for concerts and cultural events is 4,680 people. The arena also features a 118-seat conference room. The arena is named in honor of the former player and President of the Karditsa basketball club, Giannis Bourousis.

== History ==
Construction on the arena began in 2014, and it was completed in 2019. Upon completion, the arena featured a permanent seating capacity of 2,505 people, which could later be expanded to a total capacity of 3,007 people, with the addition of a 502-seat collapsible tier. The arena officially opened on 2 November 2019, with its name at the time of its opening being either the Karditsa New Indoor Sports Arena, or the Karditsa New Indoor Sports Hall (Greek: Νέο Κλειστό Γυμναστήριο Καρδίτσας).

Upon its opening, the arena became the home venue of the Greek professional basketball club Karditsa. The club played their first home game at the arena, on the day of its opening, in a Greek 2nd Division game, during the 2019–20 season, against Charilaos Trikoupis. Charilaos Trikoupis won the game, by a score of 73–62.

The arena was officially renamed to Giannis Bourousis New Indoor Sports Arena, in a ceremony honoring the former Greek national team player, on 17 September 2022. In April 2022, plans for the addition of a 502-seat collapsible tier were approved. In December 2023, the arena's seating capacity was increased to 3,500, as part of improvements ahead of the arena's hosting of the 2023 Greek Basket League All-Star Game.

== See also ==
- List of indoor arenas in Greece
