= Greek Basketball League =

First-tier professional men's basketball league in Greece

- Founded: 1927; 99 years ago
- First season: 1927–28
- Country: Greece
- Federation: HEBA
- Confederation: FIBA Europe
- Number of teams: 14
- Level on pyramid: 1
- Relegation to: Elite League
- Domestic cup: Greek Cup
- Supercup: GBL Super Cup
- International cup(s): EuroLeague; EuroCup; FIBA Champions League; FIBA Europe Cup
- Current champions: Olympiacos (16th title)
- Most championships: Panathinaikos (40 titles)
- All-time top scorer: (Greece) Nikos Galis
- President: (Greece) Michalis Melis
- TV partners: Skai TV
- Website: www.esake.gr
- 2026–27 GBL season

The Greek Basketball League (GBL), also known as Stoiximan GBL for sponsorship reasons, is the top-tier professional basketball league in Greece. It is run by the Hellenic Basketball Association (abbreviated as HEBA; Greek: ΕΣΑΚΕ), under the legal authority of the Hellenic Basketball Federation (abbreviated as HBF; Greek: ΕΟΚ).

The GBL follows FIBA rules, runs from October to June, and currently consists of 14 teams, each playing 26 games during the regular season, with the top 8 teams then competing in playoffs to determine the champion. The lowest-ranked team of the regular season is relegated to the Greek Elite League and replaced by the top team in that division, while a second team is promoted through playoffs.

The first official Greek basketball championship was held in the 1927–28 season, while its nationwide format was introduced in the 1963–64 season and the playoff round in the 1986–87 season. The league allowed foreign (non-Greek) players to participate for the first time in the 1988–89 season and became a fully professional competition in the 1992–93 season. Historically, the GBL has been ranked as one of the top 3 domestic leagues in European basketball.

== History ==
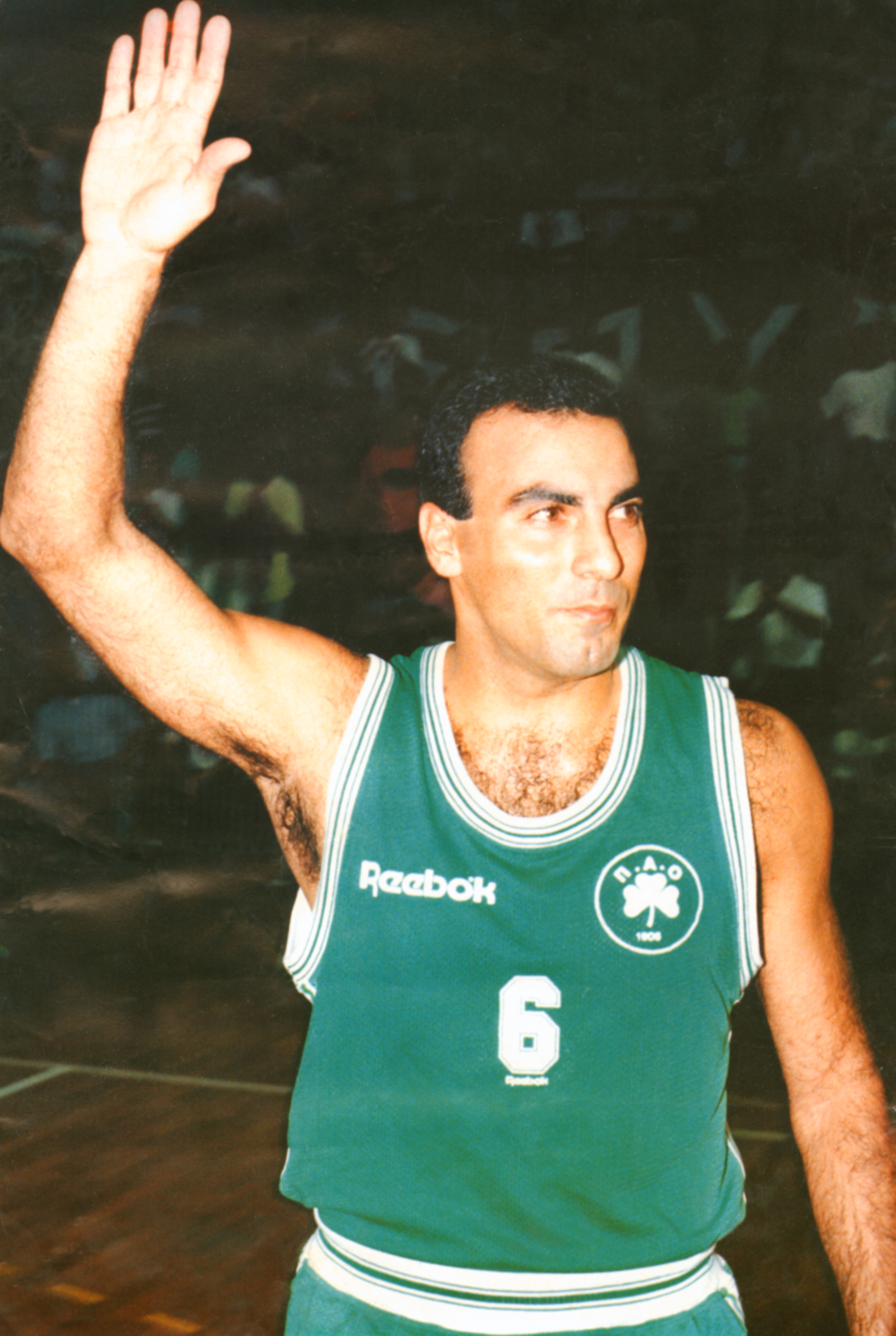
Nikos Galis, 8×GBL Champion, 5×GBL MVP, 4×GBL Finals MVP, 11×GBL Top Scorer, GBL HOF

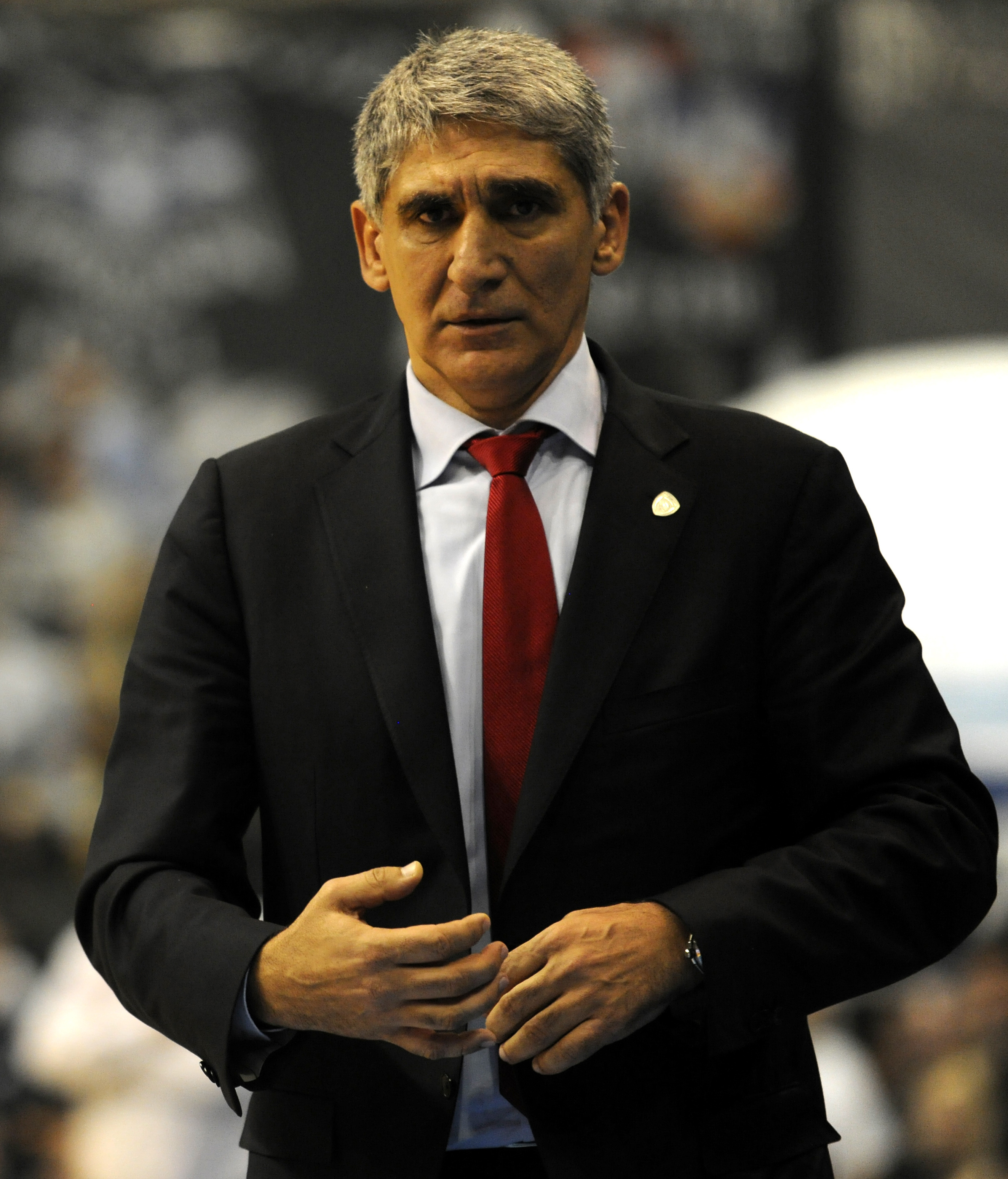
Panagiotis Giannakis, 7×GBL Champion, GBL Top Scorer, GBL HOF

The first official regional club basketball tournament in Greece took place in 1924, while the first edition of the Greek basketball championship was held in 1927–28. There have been four official championship eras. The first was the Panhellenic Championship (Πανελλήνιο Πρωτάθλημα), organized by the Hellenic Athletics Federation (SEGAS) and lasting from the 1927–28 to the 1962–63 season, where the champions of the regional tournaments played each other to determine the Greek Champion.

The second era started in the 1963–64 season, when the A' National Category (Α' Εθνική Κατηγορία) or Alpha National Category was established. In 1969, the Hellenic Basketball Federation took over the supervision of the competition from SEGAS.

The third era took place between the 1986–87 and 1991–92 seasons. The A' National Category was divided into the first-tier A1 National Category (Α1 Εθνική Κατηγορία) and the second-tier A2 National Category (Α2 Εθνική Κατηγορία), while playoffs were introduced for the first time after the regular season. The 1988–89 season marked the first time that league teams were allowed to have foreign players on their rosters.

The fourth era began in the 1992–93 season, when the Hellenic Basketball Association (HEBA) took over the competition and renamed the A1 National Category to HEBA A1 (ΕΣΑΚΕ Α1). In the 2012–13 season, HEBA A1 was renamed to Basket League and in the 2024-25 season to Greek Basketball League (GBL).

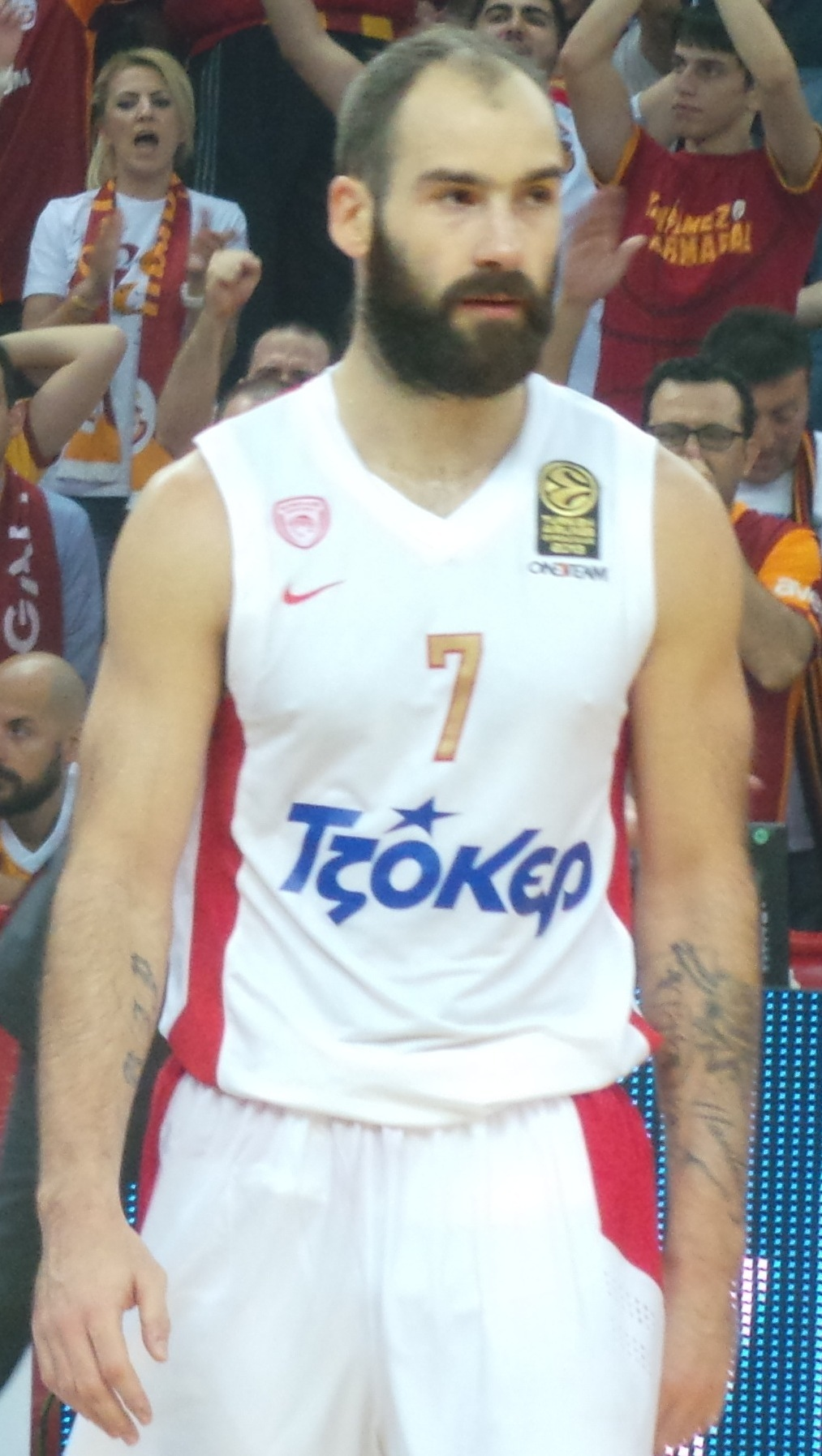
Vassilis Spanoulis, 7×GBL Champion, 4×GBL MVP, 3×GBL Finals MVP, 10×All-GBL Team, GBL All-Time Leading Scorer, GBL All-Time Leader in Assists, GBL HOF

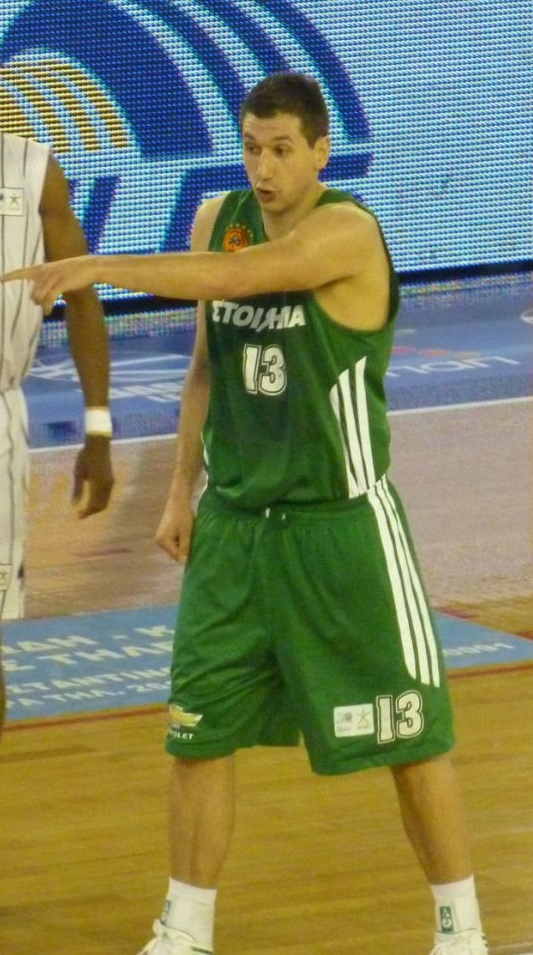
Dimitris Diamantidis, 9×GBL Champion, 6×GBL MVP, 4×GBL Finals MVP, 11×All-GBL Team, GBL All-Time Leader in Steals, GBL HOF

The GBL emerged during the 1990s as the most competitive European basketball league and after a relative decline in the following decades, it is currently ranked among the best domestic leagues in Europe and the world. It is also ranked as one of the top 3 European domestic leagues of all time along with the Spanish Liga ACB and the Italian Lega Basket Serie A.

The league features two of the top European basketball clubs, Panathinaikos (7 EuroLeague titles) and Olympiacos (4 EuroLeague titles), as well as other successful clubs in European competitions, such as AEK (2 FIBA Saporta Cup titles, 1 FIBA Champions League title), Aris (1 FIBA Saporta Cup title, 1 FIBA Korać Cup title, 1 FIBA EuroCup Challenge title), PAOK (1 FIBA Saporta Cup title, 1 FIBA Korać Cup title) and Maroussi (1 FIBA Saporta Cup title). The first five clubs are also the most widely supported in Greece.

Although the championship has been held 86 times, only nine clubs have won it to date. The dominant one is Panathinaikos, having celebrated 40 titles. The "Greens" were the most successful club in the 1970s, 2000s and 2010s, AEK in the 1960s and Olympiacos in the 1990s. In the 1980s, Aris, led by Nikos Galis and Panagiotis Giannakis, was the best Greek club and one of the strongest in Europe, and is credited with boosting the interest of the Greek public in the sport. Other clubs that have won the championship are Panellinios, PAOK, Iraklis, Near East and University of Athens. Since the establishment of the A' National Category in the 1963–64 season, only two clubs have participated in every season of the competition, Panathinaikos and Aris.

== Brand ==
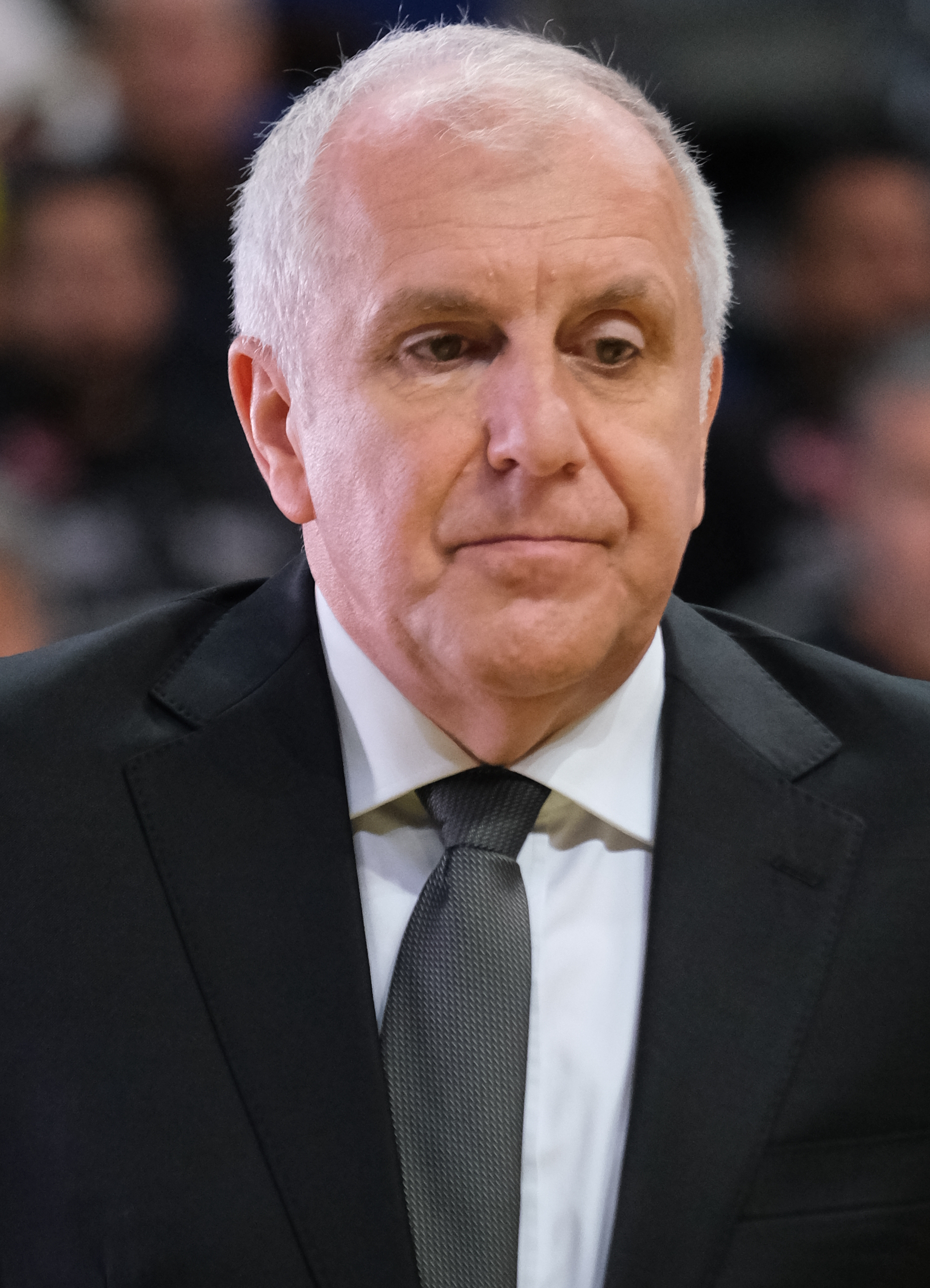
Željko Obradović, 11×GBL Champion, 4×GBL COY, GBL HOF

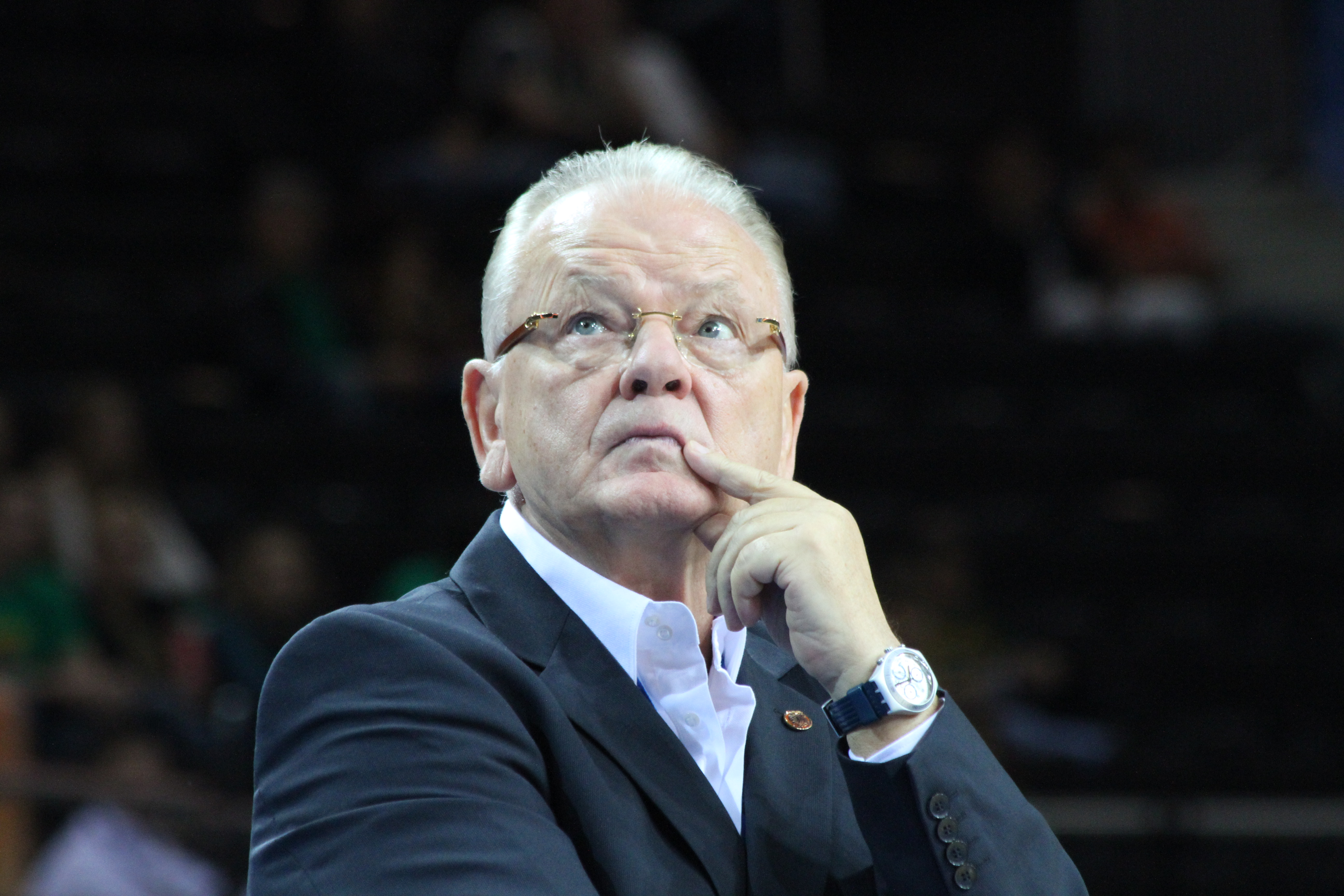
Dušan Ivković, 3×GBL Champion, 2×GBL COY, GBL HOF

=== Name ===
- Amateur era (1927–28 to 1991–92):
  - 1927–28 to 1962–63: Panhellenic Championship
  - 1963–64 to 1985–86: Alpha (A) National Division
  - 1986–87 to 1991–92: Alpha1 (A1) National Division
- Professional era (1992–93 to present):
  - 1992–93 to 2011–12: Alpha1 (A1) National Division
  - 2012–13 to 2023–24: Basket League
  - 2024–25 to present: Greek Basketball League (GBL)

=== Logo ===
2012–2013

2013–2024

== Regulations ==
The championship, in its current form, has been organized since the 1992–93 season by the Hellenic Basketball Association (HEBA), under the authority of the Hellenic Basketball Federation. The fully professional Greek basketball clubs compete in the first division championship, which is often colloquially called the "A1", in which 12 teams compete for the Greek National Championship. There is also a professional level second division championship that is run entirely by the Hellenic Basketball Federation, which is called the "A2", in which 16 teams compete for the second division crown. The bottom one place finishing team each year in the A1 division standings is relegated to the A2 division, due to poor performance. While conversely, the top one teams each year from the A2 division is promoted to the A1 division, due to good performance.

=== Club and arena standards ===
In order to compete in the Greek Basketball League, clubs must invest a minimum of €1 million on club operations per season. The minimum club budget per season is €800,000, and each club must also invest €200,000 into a league-wide fund that insures players get their full salaries. Most of the league's clubs invest more than the minimum requirements in each season.

Currently, Greek Basketball League clubs must play their home games in arenas with a seating capacity of at least 2,000 people, in order to play Greek domestic league games. Some Greek clubs have two arenas that they primarily use. One for domestic Greek League games, and one for European-wide games.

Greek clubs that play in European-wide competitions, such as the EuroLeague, the EuroCup, or the FIBA Champions League, must play their home games in those leagues in arenas that fit the arena standards of those leagues. Which are currently, a 5,000 seat minimum for the EuroLeague, and a 3,000 seat minimum for the EuroCup and FIBA Champions League.

=== Foreign players ===
Greek Basketball League teams were first allowed to have foreign (non-Greek) players on their rosters in the 1988–89 season. Under the league's current foreign player rules, Greek Basketball League teams must have at least 6 players with Greek citizenship on their active 12-man game rosters. Each team is allowed to have up to 6 foreign (non-Greek) players on their active 12-man game roster.

Starting with the 2022–23 season, each team can have a total of up to 7 foreign players registered on its active league roster. However, every team is obliged to select only 6 of them for the 12 man game rosters, right before each game is started. Originally, that rotation of 6 of the 7 foreign players was not allowed to take place during the league's playoffs. However, it was ultimately decided that starting with the 2023–24 season, the aforementioned rotation of 6 out of the 7 foreign players on each team's roster, is also allowed in the league's playoffs.

However, there are no restrictions on the number of foreign players allowed by country of origin, or on the overall total number of foreign players allowed to be signed to a team's roster. Meaning that for example, any team in the league can sign any number of American players, Canadian players, or players from European countries, etc., that it wants to, and that any team in the league can sign as many foreign players overall to its roster as it wants to, but that they can only register 7 of them at a time to the active roster, and that they can only play 6 of them in any one game.

== Champions ==
- 1927–28: Iraklis
- 1928–29: Panellinios
- 1929–30: Aris
- 1930–34: Not held
- 1934–35: Iraklis
- 1935–36: Near East
- 1936–37: University of Athens
- 1937–38: Not held
- 1938–39: Panellinios
- 1939–40: Panellinios
- 1940–45: Not held
- 1945–46: Panathinaikos
- 1946–47: Panathinaikos
- 1947–48: Not held
- 1948–49: Olympiacos
- 1949–50: Panathinaikos
- 1950–51: Panathinaikos
- 1951–52: Not held
- 1952–53: Panellinios
- 1953–54: Panathinaikos
- 1954–55: Panellinios
- 1955–56: Not held
- 1956–57: Panellinios
- 1957–58: AEK
- 1958–59: PAOK
- 1959–60: Olympiacos
- 1960–61: Panathinaikos
- 1961–62: Panathinaikos
- 1962–63: AEK
- 1963–64: AEK
- 1964–65: AEK
- 1965–66: AEK
- 1966–67: Panathinaikos
- 1967–68: AEK
- 1968–69: Panathinaikos
- 1969–70: AEK
- 1970–71: Panathinaikos
- 1971–72: Panathinaikos
- 1972–73: Panathinaikos
- 1973–74: Panathinaikos
- 1974–75: Panathinaikos
- 1975–76: Olympiacos
- 1976–77: Panathinaikos
- 1977–78: Olympiacos
- 1978–79: Aris
- 1979–80: Panathinaikos
- 1980–81: Panathinaikos
- 1981–82: Panathinaikos
- 1982–83: Aris
- 1983–84: Panathinaikos
- 1984–85: Aris
- 1985–86: Aris
- 1986–87: Aris
- 1987–88: Aris
- 1988–89: Aris
- 1989–90: Aris
- 1990–91: Aris
- 1991–92: PAOK
- 1992–93: Olympiacos
- 1993–94: Olympiacos
- 1994–95: Olympiacos
- 1995–96: Olympiacos
- 1996–97: Olympiacos
- 1997–98: Panathinaikos
- 1998–99: Panathinaikos
- 1999–00: Panathinaikos
- 2000–01: Panathinaikos
- 2001–02: AEK
- 2002–03: Panathinaikos
- 2003–04: Panathinaikos
- 2004–05: Panathinaikos
- 2005–06: Panathinaikos
- 2006–07: Panathinaikos
- 2007–08: Panathinaikos
- 2008–09: Panathinaikos
- 2009–10: Panathinaikos
- 2010–11: Panathinaikos
- 2011–12: Olympiacos
- 2012–13: Panathinaikos
- 2013–14: Panathinaikos
- 2014–15: Olympiacos
- 2015–16: Olympiacos
- 2016–17: Panathinaikos
- 2017–18: Panathinaikos
- 2018–19: Panathinaikos
- 2019–20: Panathinaikos
- 2020–21: Panathinaikos
- 2021–22: Olympiacos
- 2022–23: Olympiacos
- 2023–24: Panathinaikos
- 2024–25: Olympiacos
- 2025–26: Olympiacos

Club	Titles	Seasons
Panathinaikos Athens	40	1945–46, 1946–47, 1949–50, 1950–51, 1953–54, 1960–61, 1961–62, 1966–67, 1968–69, 1970–71, 1971–72, 1972–73, 1973–74, 1974–75, 1976–77, 1979–80, 1980–81, 1981–82, 1983–84, 1997–98, 1998–99, 1999–00, 2000–01, 2002–03, 2003–04, 2004–05, 2005–06, 2006–07, 2007–08, 2008–09, 2009–10, 2010–11, 2012–13, 2013–14, 2016–17, 2017–18, 2018–19, 2019–20, 2020–21, 2023–24
Olympiacos Piraeus	16	1948–49, 1959–60, 1975–76, 1977–78, 1992–93, 1993–94, 1994–95, 1995–96, 1996–97, 2011–12, 2014–15, 2015–16, 2021–22, 2022–23, 2024–25, 2025–26
Aris Thessaloniki	10	1929–30, 1978–79, 1982–83, 1984–85, 1985–86, 1986–87, 1987–88, 1988–89, 1989–90, 1990–91
AEK Athens	8	1957–58, 1962–63, 1963–64, 1964–65, 1965–66, 1967–68, 1969–70, 2001–02
Panellinios Athens	6	1928–29, 1938–39, 1939–40, 1952–53, 1954–55, 1956–57
Iraklis Thessaloniki	2	1927–28, 1934–35
PAOK Thessaloniki	2	1958–59, 1991–92
Near East Athens	1	1935–36
University of Athens	1	1936–37

== Clubs ==
=== 2026–27 season participants ===
Locations of the 2026–27 GBL clubs

Club	Location	Arena	Cap.
AEK	Athens	SUNEL Arena	9,025
Aris	Thessaloniki	Alexandreio Melathron	6,014
Doxa	Lefkada	Lefkada Indoor Hall	1,200
Iraklis	Thessaloniki	Ivanofeio Indoor Hall	2,635
Karditsa	Karditsa	Giannis Bourousis Indoor Hall	3,200
Kolossos	Rhodes	Kallithea Indoor Hall	3,200
Maroussi	Athens	Agios Thomas Indoor Hall	1,350
Mykonos	Mykonos	Panagiotis Chaniotis Indoor Hall	1,000
Olympiacos	Athens	SUNEL Arena	9,025
Panathinaikos	Athens	Telekom Center Athens	19,250
PAOK	Thessaloniki	PAOK Sports Arena	8,142
Peristeri	Athens	Andreas Papandreou Indoor Hall	4,000
Promitheas	Patras	Dimitris Tofalos Indoor Hall	5,150
Vikos	Ioannina	Sideris Karadimas Indoor Hall	400

=== Number of seasons in the top-tier level Greek Basket League in total (1928 to 2026–27) ===
The total number of times that each club has played in the top-tier level Greek Basket League, through all of its different league formats.

- 1927–28 to 1960–61: Panhellenic Championship
- 1961–62 to 1962–63: Panhellenic First Category Championship (1st) (A)
- 1963–64 to 1985–86: Alpha (A) National Category
- 1986–87 to 1991–92: Alpha1 (A1) National Category
- 1992–93 to 2011–12: HEBA Alpha1 (A1)
- 2012–13 to 2023–24: Basket League
- 2024–25 to present: Greek Basketball League (GBL)

Note: The 2026–27 GBL clubs are highlighted.

Club	Seasons
Panathinaikos Athens	77
Aris Thessaloniki	73
Olympiacos Piraeus	71
AEK Athens	70
PAOK Thessaloniki	70
Iraklis Thessaloniki	55
Panionios Athens	53
Panellinios Athens	46
Sporting Athens	43
Apollon Patras	34
Peristeri Athens	31
Maroussi Athens	28
HAN Thessaloniki	22
Kolossos Rhodes	21
Pagrati Athens	17
Ionikos Nikaia	16
GS Larissa	12
Triton Athens	11
Near East Athens	11
Promitheas Patras	11
AGO Rethymno	10
GS Lavrio	10
Dimokritos Thessaloniki	9
Dafni Athens	8
OAA Irakleio	8
Ilysiakos Athens	8
VAO Thessaloniki	7
Papagou Athens	7

Club	Seasons
Olympia Larissa	7
Esperos Athens	6
Makedonikos Thessaloniki	6
EK Kavala	6
KAO Drama	5
Aiolos Trikala	5
AS Karditsa	5
Skagiopouleio Patras	4
Anatolia College	4
Amyntas Athens	4
Peiraikos Syndesmos	4
Ionikos Nea Filadelfeia	4
Ikaros Athens	4
Koroivos Amaliada	4
University of Athens	3
HAN Nikaia/Kokkinia	3
Aetos Thessaloniki	3
Apollon Kalamaria	3
AE Larissa	3
Aigaleo Athens	3
AOK Panelefsiniakos	3
Nea Kifissia Athens	3
GS Kymi	3
Larissa Basketball	3
Neoi Vyronas Athens	2
Palaio Faliro Athens	2
Triton Chalkida	2
EA Patras	2

Club	Seasons
AE Chalkida	2
Ethnikos Athens	2
Niki Volos	2
Philippos Thessaloniki	2
Ampelokipoi Athens	2
Milon Athens	2
Olympias Patras	2
Trikala 2000	2
Ifaistos Limnos	2
Doxa Lefkada	2
Mykonos Basketball	2
Apollon Athens	1
HAN Athens	1
AE Emporoypallilon	1
Neochori Rhodes	1
Diagoras Rhodes	1
Keravnos Cairo	1
Olympiakos Addis Ababa	1
Pierikos Katerini	1
Thyella Serres	1
MENT Thessaloniki	1
Αrkadikos Tripoli	1
Faros Larissa	1
Holargos Athens	1
Trikoupis Messolonghi	1
Vikos Ioannina	1

=== Number of seasons in the A and A1 National Categories by club (1963–64 to 2026–27) ===
- 1963–64 to 1985–86: Alpha (A) National Division
- 1986–87 to 2011–12: Alpha1 (A1) National Division
- 2012–13 to 2023–24: Basket League
- 2024–25 to present: Greek Basketball League (GBL)

Note: The 2026–27 GBL clubs are highlighted.

Club	Seasons
Aris Thessaloniki	64
Panathinaikos Athens	64
PAOK Thessaloniki	63
AEK Athens	61
Olympiacos Piraeus	59
Panionios Athens	49
Iraklis Thessaloniki	46
Apollon Patras	34
Sporting Athens	31
Peristeri Athens	31
Panellinios Athens	30
Maroussi Athens	28
Kolossos Rhodes	21
Pagrati Athens	17
Ionikos Nikaia	16
HAN Thessaloniki	12
GS Larissa	12
Promitheas Patras	11
AGO Rethymno	10
GS Lavrio	10
Dimokritos Thessaloniki	9
Dafni Athens	8
OAA Irakleio	8

Club	Seasons
Ilysiakos Athens	8
Papagou Athens	7
Near East Athens	7
Olympia Larissa	7
Esperos Athens	6
Makedonikos Thessaloniki	6
EK Kavala	6
VAO Thessaloniki	5
KAO Drama	5
Aiolos Trikala	5
AS Karditsa	5
Amyntas Athens	4
Triton Athens	4
Ionikos Nea Filadelfia	4
Ikaros Athens	4
Koroivos Amaliada	4
Aetos Thessaloniki	3
Apollon Kalamaria	3
AE Larissa	3
Aigaleo Athens	3
AOK Panelefsiniakos	3
Nea Kifissia Athens	3
GS Kymi	3

Club	Seasons
Larissa Basketball	3
Anatolia College	2
HAN Nikaia/Kokkinia	2
Niki Volos	2
Philippos Thessaloniki	2
Ampelokipoi Athens	2
Peiraikos Syndesmos	2
Milon Athens	2
Olympias Patras	2
Trikala 2000	2
Ifaistos Limnos	2
Doxa Lefkada	2
Mykonos Basketball	2
Pierikos Katerini	1
Thyella Serres	1
MENT Thessaloniki	1
Arkadikos Tripoli	1
Faros Larissa	1
Holargos Athens	1
Trikoupis Messolonghi	1
Vikos Ioannina	1

=== Number of seasons in the Panhellenic Championship (1927–28 to 1962–63) ===
The number of times that clubs participated in the league's original format, the Panhellenic Championship.

Note: The 2026–27 GBL clubs are highlighted.

Club	Seasons
Panellinios Athens	16
Panathinaikos Athens	13
Olympiacos Piraeus	12
Sporting Athens	12
HAN Thessaloniki	10
AEK Athens	9
Aris Thessaloniki	9
Iraklis Thessaloniki	9
PAOK Thessaloniki	7
Triton Athens	7
Near East Athens	4

Club	Seasons
Panionios Athens	4
Skagiopouleio Patras	4
University of Athens	3
VAO Thessaloniki	2
Peiraikos Syndesmos	2
Neoi Vyronas Athens	2
Palaio Faliro Athens	2
Triton Chalkida	2
EA Patras	2
AE Chalkida	2
Ethnikos Athens	2

Club	Seasons
Anatolia College	2
Apollon Athens	1
HAN Athens	1
AE Emporoypallilon	1
HAN Nikaia/Kokkinia	1
Neochori Rhodes	1
Diagoras Rhodes	1
Keravnos Cairo	1
Olympiakos Addis Ababa	1

== Playoff finals ==
=== Results ===
Since the 1986–87 season, the champion has been determined through playoff rounds held after the end of the regular season.

The results of the playoff finals are as follows.

Season	Home court advantage	Result	Home court disadvantage	Regular season	
Season	Home court advantage	Result	Home court disadvantage	1st	Record
1986–87	Aris	3–0	Panionios	Aris	18–0
1987–88	Aris	3–0	PAOK	Aris	18–0
1988–89	Aris	3–1	PAOK	Aris	17–1
1989–90	Aris was declared champion through a round-robin tournament between the top four teams of the regular season.			PAOK	20–2
1990–91	Aris	4–2	PAOK	Aris	20–2
1991–92	PAOK	4–1	Olympiacos	PAOK	20–2
1992–93	Panathinaikos	1–3	Olympiacos	PAOK	22–4
1993–94	Olympiacos	3–2	PAOK	Olympiacos	22–4
1994–95	Olympiacos	3–2	Panathinaikos	Olympiacos	24–2
1995–96	Olympiacos	3–2	Panathinaikos	Olympiacos	24–2
1996–97	Olympiacos	3–1	AEK	Olympiacos	21–5
1997–98	Panathinaikos	3–2	PAOK	Panathinaikos	21–5
1998–99	Olympiacos	2–3	Panathinaikos	Olympiacos	21–5
1999–00	Panathinaikos	3–0	PAOK	Olympiacos	21–5
2000–01	Panathinaikos	3–2	Olympiacos	Panathinaikos	22–4
2001–02	AEK	3–2	Olympiacos	AEK	23–3
2002–03	Panathinaikos	3–1	AEK	Panathinaikos	21–5
2003–04	Panathinaikos	3–0	Maroussi	Panathinaikos	22–4
2004–05	Panathinaikos	3–1	AEK	Panathinaikos	22–4
2005–06	Panathinaikos	3–0	Olympiacos	Panathinaikos	24–2
2006–07	Panathinaikos	3–2	Olympiacos	Panathinaikos	24–2
2007–08	Panathinaikos	3–2	Olympiacos	Panathinaikos	23–3
2008–09	Olympiacos	1–3	Panathinaikos	Olympiacos	25–1
2009–10	Panathinaikos	3–1	Olympiacos	Panathinaikos	25–1
2010–11	Olympiacos	1–3	Panathinaikos	Olympiacos	26–0
2011–12	Olympiacos	3–2	Panathinaikos	Olympiacos	23–1
2012–13	Olympiacos	0–3	Panathinaikos	Olympiacos	25–1
2013–14	Panathinaikos	3–2	Olympiacos	Panathinaikos	25–1
2014–15	Olympiacos	3–0	Panathinaikos	Olympiacos	25–1
2015–16	Olympiacos	3–1	Panathinaikos	Olympiacos	25–1
2016–17	Olympiacos	2–3	Panathinaikos	Olympiacos	25–1
2017–18	Panathinaikos	3–2	Olympiacos	Panathinaikos	26–0
2018–19	Panathinaikos	3–0	Promitheas	AEK	18–8
2019–20	Panathinaikos was declared champion through regular season standings due to the COVID-19 pandemic			Panathinaikos	18–2
2020–21	Panathinaikos	3–1	Lavrio	Panathinaikos	20–2
2021–22	Olympiacos	3–0	Panathinaikos	Olympiacos	23–1
2022–23	Olympiacos	3–1	Panathinaikos	Olympiacos	22–0
2023–24	Panathinaikos	3–2	Olympiacos	Panathinaikos	26–1
2024–25	Panathinaikos	1–3	Olympiacos	Panathinaikos	22–0
2025–26	Olympiacos	3–2	Panathinaikos	Olympiacos	24–0

=== Participations by club ===
Club	W	L	Total
Panathinaikos	20	10	30
Olympiacos	12	15	27
Aris	4	0	4
PAOK	1	6	7
AEK	1	3	4
Panionios	0	1	1
Maroussi	0	1	1
Promitheas	0	1	1
Lavrio	0	1	1

== Statistics ==
=== Best regular season records in the history of the A and A1 National Categories (1963–2024) ===
- 1963–64 to 1985–86: **Alpha (A) National Category**
- 1986–87 to 1991–92: **Alpha1 (A1) National Category**
- 1992–93 to 2009–10: **HEBA Alpha1 (A1)**
- 2010–11 to 2023–24: **Greek Basket League**
- 2024–25 to present: **Greek Basketball League (GBL)**

=== A and A1 National Category (1963–2024) ===
Season	Team	Regular season Record	Playoff record	Final Record (Including playoffs)	Final Season Result
1985–86	Aris	26-0	—	26-0	Champion
1967–68	AEK	22-0	—	22-0	Champion
1975–76	Olympiacos	22-0	—	22-0	Champion
1986–87	Aris	18-0	3-0	21-0	Champion
1987–88	Aris	18-0	3-0	21-0	Champion
2017–18	Panathinaikos	26-0	8-2	34-2	Champion
1979–80	Panathinaikos	16-0	12-2	28-2	Champion
2010–11	Olympiacos	26-0	6–3	32–3	Finalist

=== The best overall season records of the HEBA A1 (1992–2026) ===
Season	Club	Regular season Record	Playoff record	Final Record	Final Season Result
2017–18	Panathinaikos	26–0	8–2	34–2	Champion
2009–10	Panathinaikos	25–1	8–1	33–2	Champion
2014–15	Olympiacos	25–1	8–1	33–2	Champion
2015–16	Olympiacos	25–1	8–1	33–2	Champion
2013–14	Panathinaikos	25–1	8–2	33–3	Champion
2023–24	Panathinaikos	26–1	7–2	33–3	Champion
2005–06	Panathinaikos	24–2	8–0	32–2	Champion
2018–19	Panathinaikos	24–2	8–0	32–2	Champion
2010–11	Panathinaikos	24–2	8–1	32–3	Champion
2010–11	Olympiacos	26–0	6–3	32–3	Finalist
2006–07	Panathinaikos	24–2	8–2	32–4	Champion
2021–22	Olympiacos	23–1	8–0	31–1	Champion
2011–12	Olympiacos	23–1	8–2	31–3	Champion
2008–09	Olympiacos	25–1	6–3	31–4	Finalist
2016–17	Panathinaikos	25–1	6–3	31–4	Champion
2022–23	Olympiacos	22–0	8–1	30–1	Champion
2025–26	Olympiacos	24–0	7–2	31–2	Champion

=== All-time stats leaders ===
The all-time stats leaders of the HEBA fully professional level era Greek Basketball League, from the 1992–93 season to the present. These are the officially recognized league stats leaders. Although the Greek Basketball League officially recognizes results and championships from the earlier formats of the league, it only officially recognizes the stats leaders since the league's professional era began, with the 1992–93 season. The competition's stats from years prior, when the league was officially classified as an amateur level competition, are officially recognized by All-time Top 10 scorers.

1.Nikos Galis 384 12,864 33.5

2.Vassilis Goumas 412 11,030 26.8

3.Panagiotis Giannakis 493 9,291 18.8

4.Apostolos Kontos 8,712

5.Takis Koroneos 7,465

6.Angelos Koronios 448 7,080 15.8

7.Dimitris Fosses 408 6,809 16.7

8.Pavlos Stamelos 361 6,645 18.4

9.Minas Gekos 6,511

10.Steve Giatzoglou 6,044

- Through the 2023–24 season.
- Currently active players in the league in **bold**.

Rank	Player	Games played
1	(Greece) Nikos Chatzis	554
2	(Greece) Dimitris Diamantidis	525
3	(Greece) Nikos Boudouris	510
4	(Greece) Vassilis Xanthopoulos	505
5	(Greece) Vassilis Spanoulis	499

Rank	Player	Points scored
1	(Greece) Vassilis Spanoulis	5,517
2	(Greece) Nikos Chatzis	5,200
3	(Greece) Angelos Koronios	5,170
4	(Greece) Panagiotis Liadelis	4,806
5	(Greece) Fragiskos Alvertis	4,574

Rank	Player	Total Rebounds
1	(Greece) Kostas Tsartsaris	2,173
2	(Greece) Dimitris Diamantidis	1,948
3	(Greece) Georgios Karagkoutis	1,877
4	(Croatia) Stojko Vranković	1,851
5	(Greece) Ioannis Bourousis	1,803

Rank	Player	Assists
1	(Greece) Vassilis Spanoulis	2,180
2	(Greece) Dimitris Diamantidis	2,141
3	(Greece) Vassilis Xanthopoulos	1,607
4	(Greece) / (United States) Nick Calathes	1,285
5	(Greece) Nikos Vetoulas	1,093

Rank	Player	Steals
1	(Greece) Dimitris Diamantidis	785
2	(Greece) Vassilis Xanthopoulos	594
3	(Greece) Manos Papamakarios	520
4	(Greece) Georgios Sigalas	472
5	(Greece) Nikos Vetoulas	470

Rank	Player	Blocks
1	(Greece) Panagiotis Fasoulas	465
2	(Croatia) Stojko Vranković	456
3	(Federal Republic of Yugoslavia) / (Greece) Dragan Tarlać	256
4	(United States) Walter Berry	231
5	(Greece) Dimitris Diamantidis	228

== See also ==
- Greek Cup
- Greek Supercup
- Greek basketball clubs in international competitions
- Greek Basketball League Hall of Fame
- HEBA Greek All-Star Game
- Greek 2nd Division
- HEBA
- Basketball in Greece
